= List of historic properties in Peoria, Arizona =

- City
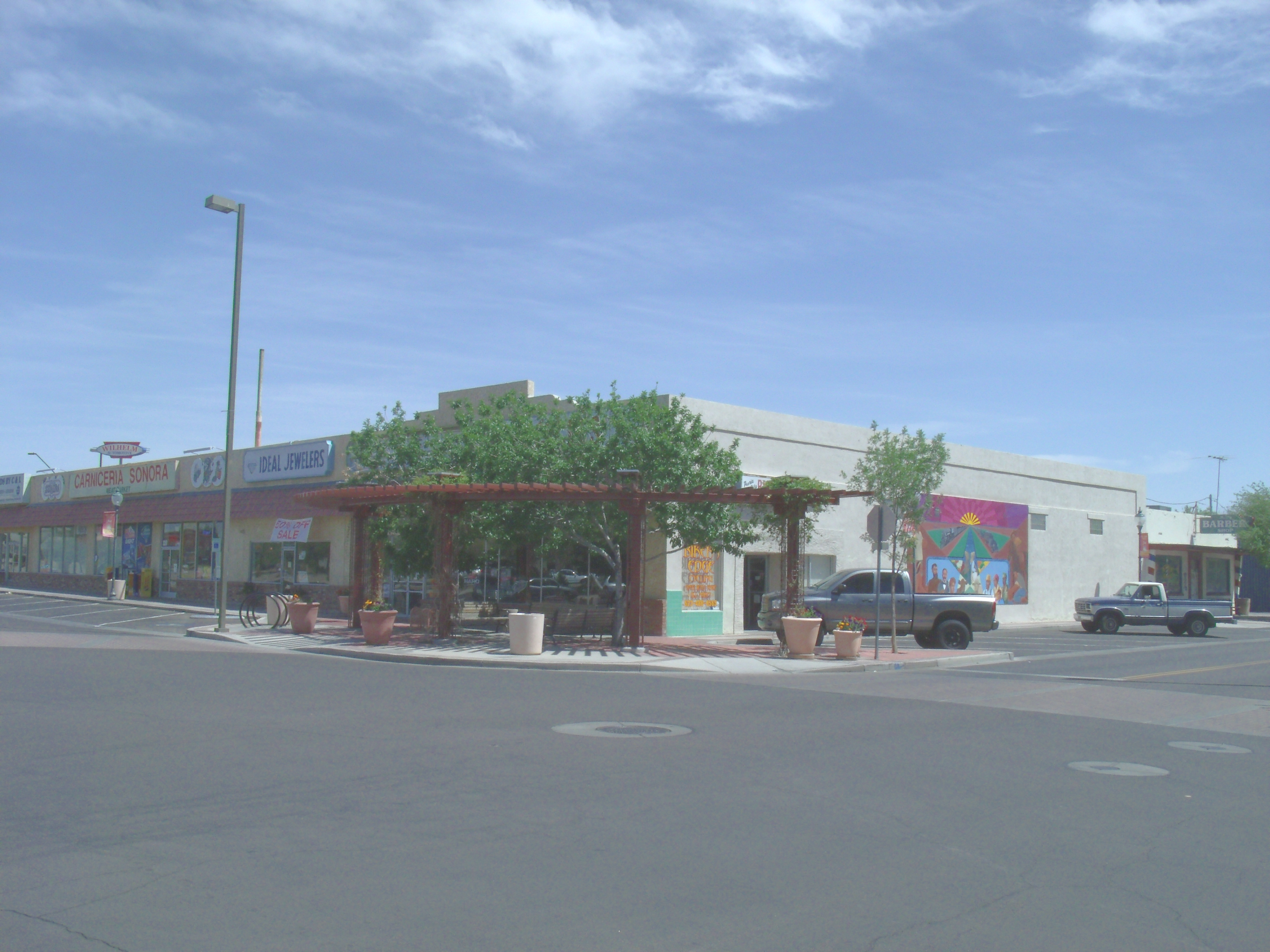
- Old Town Peoria as seen from an intersection between Washington St. and 83rd. Ave.

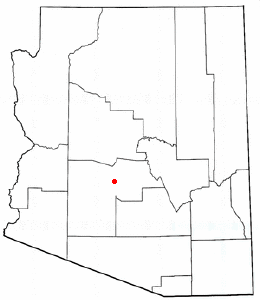
- Location in Maricopa County and the state of Arizona

This is a list, which includes a photographic gallery, of some of the remaining historic properties in the town of Peoria, Arizona. There are numerous properties in the city of Peoria which are considered to be historical and have been included either in the National Register of Historic Places or the listings of the Peoria Register of Historic Places. The following are images of some of these properties with a short description of the same. Included are images of the ruins of a Hohokam village, early inhabitants of what is now Peoria's Lake Pleasant Regional Park, located on top of Indian Mesa. Also posted are the images of some of the historic structures of Weedville, a small community founded in 1911, in an area which at the time was outside the city limits of Peoria.

== Brief history ==
Peoria is a city in Maricopa and Yavapai counties in the State of Arizona. Peoria was a farm community originally settled in the late 1880s by farmers from Peoria, Illinois. These settlers were recruited by William John Murphy a young engineer from Illinois who had just completed the grading of a stretch of the Atlantic and Pacific Railway (which later became the Atchison, Topeka and Santa Fe Railway) and who in 1885 completed the Arizona Canal.

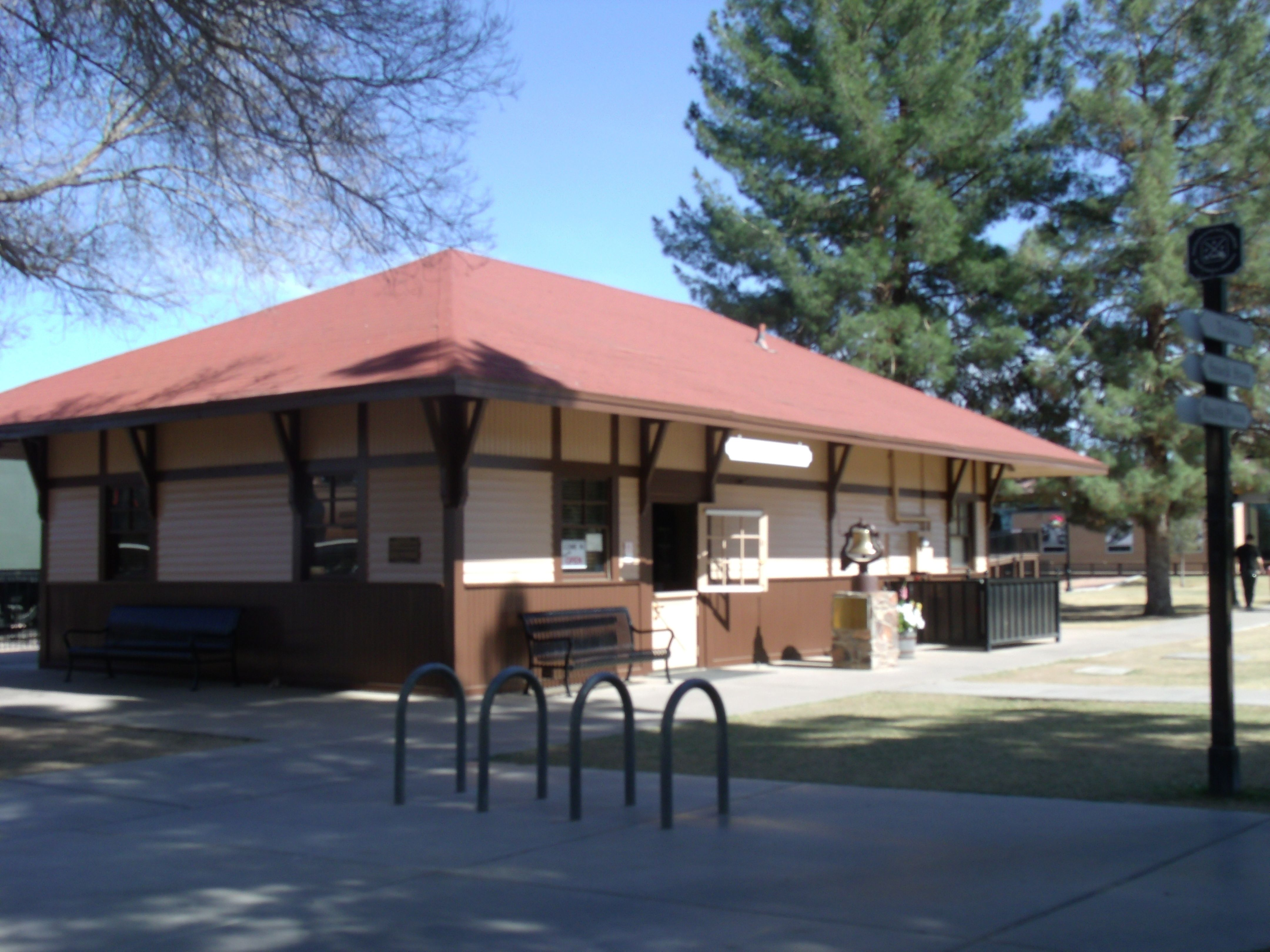
Peoria Railroad Depot – built in 1895. The station was dismantled and rebuilt at the McCormick-Stillman Railroad Park in Scottsdale, Arizona

The rail line was beneficial to the development of the town. The rail company built a small depot on 83rd Avenue just off Grand Avenue. Thus, the local ranchers and farmers were able to ship via rail and sell their crops and cattle to other towns in the area. The people of Peoria were also able to purchase goods which arrived by rail from other locations. A fire in 1917 destroyed all but one building in the downtown core. After that event, there was a concerted effort to build with more substantial materials. Peoria was incorporated in 1954.

The Peoria Arizona Historical Society was founded in 1990. Its goal is to preserve the buildings and artifacts that are reminders of Peoria's past. The historic Peoria Central School building, located at 10394 N. 83rd Ave., serves as the society's headquarters. The society established a museum which exhibits and stores a collection of historical artifacts in the building. The society provided assistance for the city's first Historic Resource Survey in 1997, which covered the area of the original town plat.

== Peoria razing its historical properties ==
Peoria's Historical Society does not have the ability to deny a demolition permit. Owners of a property, listed either in the National Register of Historic Places or the Peoria Historic Property Register may demolish the historical property. According to the "Review of Proposed Construction Activity" section of the City of Peoria Historic Preservation Master Plan: The City may request a survey prior to construction activity or other actions that involve properties that may have historic and/or archaeological significance. The Historic Preservation Commission will review survey reports that discover properties that may be eligible for inclusion on the Peoria Register of Historic Places. New construction or rehabilitation work proposed within a local historic district or on an individual local landmark must be reviewed by the Historic Preservation Commission and receive a Certificate of Appropriateness from the commission before work may begin. In its reviews, the commission follows the standards established by the Secretary of Interior, so that each structure or site reviewed is held to the same standards. Such projects then follow all other applicable development processes. However, according to an article published in the Arizona Republic by Adrian Hedden and Laura Gomez, a citywide code enforcement initiative has led to the destruction of older buildings and homes in Old Town Peoria. Many owners can not afford to repair some of these properties and the city officials have insisted that rejuvenation and enforcement efforts are separate. Residents believe that the city is ignoring the historical preservation of these properties while pressing them to demolish older homes in need of repairs. According to Jim McPherson, Arizona Preservation Foundation Board President:

It is crucial that residents, private interests, and government officials act now to save these elements of our cultural heritage before it is too late.

Among the historic structures which no longer exist in Peoria is the old town water tower. The tower was constructed in the 1890s to provide water storage from the town's well. The tower was removed in 1936. The Edwards Hotel is another property which is in danger of being demolished. The property is boarded up and in state of abandonment. In 2017, the City of Peoria acquired a demolition permit to tear down the Edwards Hotel. They gave the Peoria Historic Preservation Commission nine days to come up with engineering studies as to why it should not be torn down. However, the century-old hotel was purchased by Dan Halbert in 2018 and will be given a second life as a vacation destination. The new owner plans to turn the hotel into a tourist attraction by advertising it as a haunted hotel. However, the 103-year-old Edwards Hotel never received the second wind its last owner promised and was demolished in 2021.

== Buildings, etc. ==
The following are the images of the historic buildings in Peoria and its surrounding areas.

- 1889 Peoria Town Well – Location of the original well in what is now Osuna Park located at the intersection of Grand Avenue and Washington Street. The "town well" provided water for local residents as well as the traveling public.
- Peoria Presbyterian Church – Built in 1899 the church is the oldest building in the original Peoria Townsite. The church is located at 10236 83rd. Ave. (NRHP)
- The Peoria Central School – The school was a two-room school built in 1906. It is currently occupied by the Peoria Arizona Historical Society Museum located at 10304 N. 83rd Ave. (NRHP)
- The Edwards Hotel – It was built in 1918 and was located in Washington St. The building, which was demolished in 2021, was Peoria's first hotel.
- Lazy J. Café – This building, built in 1918 and is located at 10455 N. 83rd Ave. was home to the Lazy J. Café and later to and Bud's Barber Shop. Bud's Barber Shop still operates from this location.
- The Saliba's Pay 'n Takit/Park & Shop – The building was built in 1918 and is located at 8295 W. Washington St. Saliba's Pay 'n Takit was Peoria's first supermarket, run by the Saliba family.
- The Arizona Bank – The bank was once housed in this building. The structure was built in 1918 and is located at 8291 W. Washington St. The storefront still possesses the original signpost from its time serving as the location of Arizona Bank.
- Peoria's Post Office – Peoria's first post office was located in 8273 & 8277 Washington St. The structure which once housed a Western Auto store was built in 1918.
- Peoria-Wood's Pharmacy – This structure built in 1918 and located at 8271 W. Washington St. was the home to Wood's Pharmacy. Charles Vickery, one of the proprietors of the pharmacy, also served as Mayor of Peoria.
- Thurton's Insurance – This structure was built in 1918 and is located at 8265 W. Grand Ave. This store once housed Thurston's Insurance and Real Estate Company run by Thomas F. Thurston. Thurston also served as the secretary as secretary of the Peoria Chamber of Commerce.
- The Kosier's Hardware – The building was built in 1918 and is located at 10440 N. 83rd Ave. It was owned by the prominent local family of the same name.
- Peoria Women's Club – Built in 1919, the building served as the place to watch a movie before the original local theater was built in Peoria. The club is located at 10351 84th Ave.(PRHP)
- Peoria Central School additions – The three additional one-room school buildings were added to the Peoria Central School in the 1920s. (NRHP)
- The Mabel Hood Building – Built in 1920 and located at the South West corner of Washington St. and 83rd Ave. (PRHP). Peoria Florist occupied the building in 2009.
- Paramount Theater – This building was built in 1920 and is located in 8307 W. Washington St. This building served as the Paramount Theater, later renamed the Peoria Theater. In 1947 the building was rebuilt after being damaged by fire. It was converted Fire Station #1 when Peoria incorporated in 1954.
- La Tapitia Café – This building was built in 1920 is located at 10411 N. 83rd Ave.
- Peoria High School – The historic Peoria High School is a public secondary school built in 1922 and located at 11200 N 83rd Ave. It is the oldest high school in the Peoria Unified School District. As of 2014, the school was in the process of being remodeled. Listed as historic by the Peoria Historic Preservation.
- Peoria Masonic Lodge 31 – The building which houses the Peoria Masonic Lodge #31 was built in 1922 and is located at 10202 N. 83rd. Ave. The Peoria Masonic Lodge was also chartered in 1922.
- Wilhelm's Garage offices – The offices of Wilhelm's Garage were built in 1928 and are located at 8241 W. Grand Ave. The location once housed the pool hall operated by E.E. Stafford where the July 1917 fire started, destroying most of the commercial district of the town.
- Wilhelm Automotive – Wilhelm Automotive was established in 1929 in Peoria, Arizona. It is one of the oldest Automotive companies in Arizona. (PRHP)
- Peoria Jail House – The structure was built in 1939. This building also held City Council meetings. The Peoria Jail House is currently maintained as a public museum that is managed by the Peoria Arizona Historical Society located at 8322 W. Washington St. (PRHP)
- The Peoria Underpass. The underpass is located in the intersection of Grand and Olive Aves. It was built c. 1930 and serves the Burlington Northern Santa Fe (BNSF) railroad system. The underpass is listed in the Arizona Historic Bridge Inventory Number: 0160. According to the Arizona Historic Bridge Inventory the underpass is eligible to be listed in the National Register of Historic Places. It is a well-preserved example of ASHD architectural treatment for an urban grade separation.
- The Quick Stop Groceries – The store was built in 1940 and is located at 8484 Madison St. It is listed in the Peoria Register of Historic Places.
- The Peoria Nazarene Church – was built in 1947 and is located at 10440 N. 84th Ave. It was sold many years later and is now listed as the "Greek Orthodox Church". It is listed in the Peoria Register of Historic Places.
Historic buildings in Old Town Peoria and the historic Peoria Uuderpass
(NRHP = National Register of Historic Places)
(PRHP=Peoria Register of Historic Places-listed)
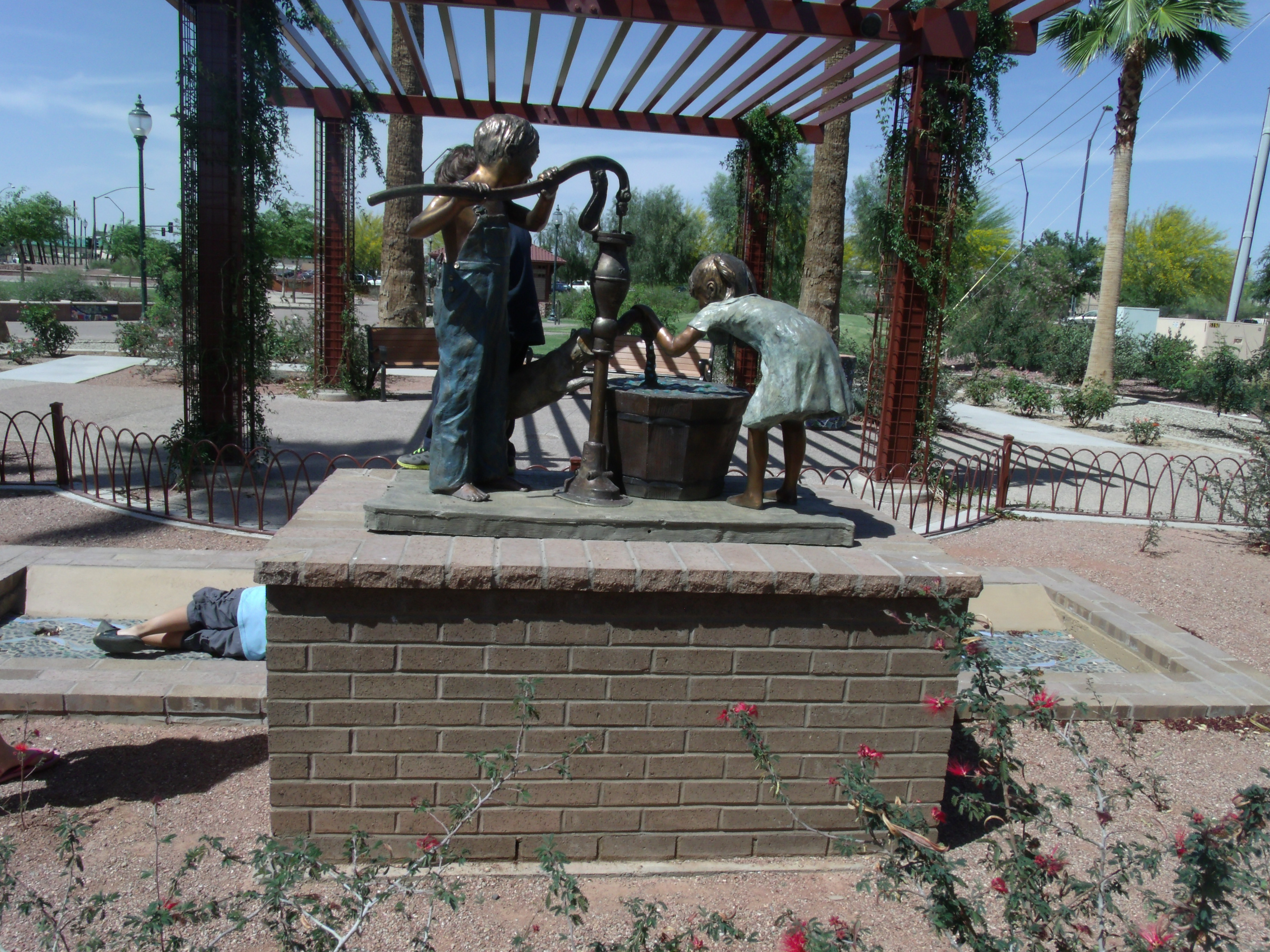
The location of the original 1889 Peoria Town Well

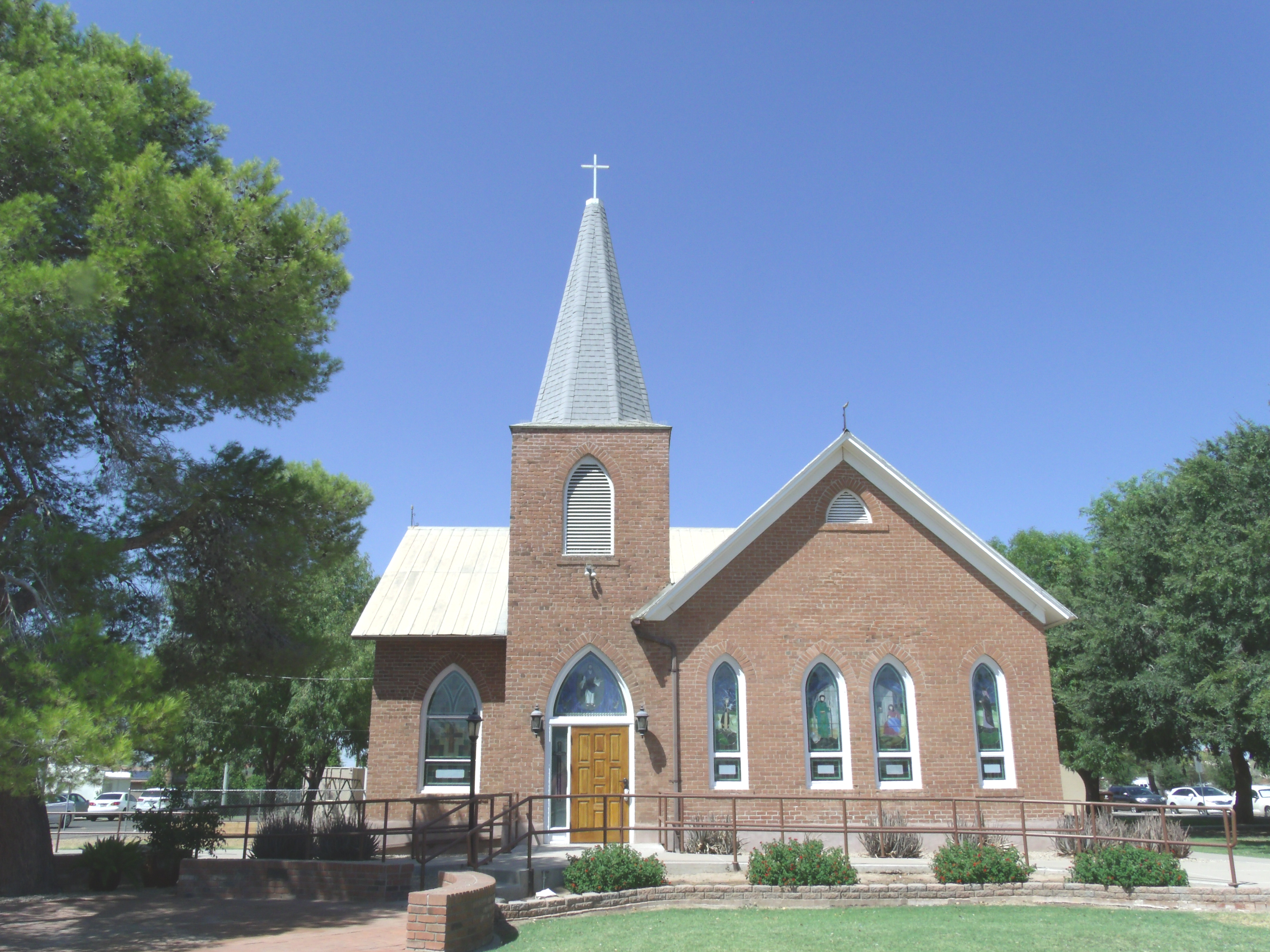
Peoria Presbyterian Church

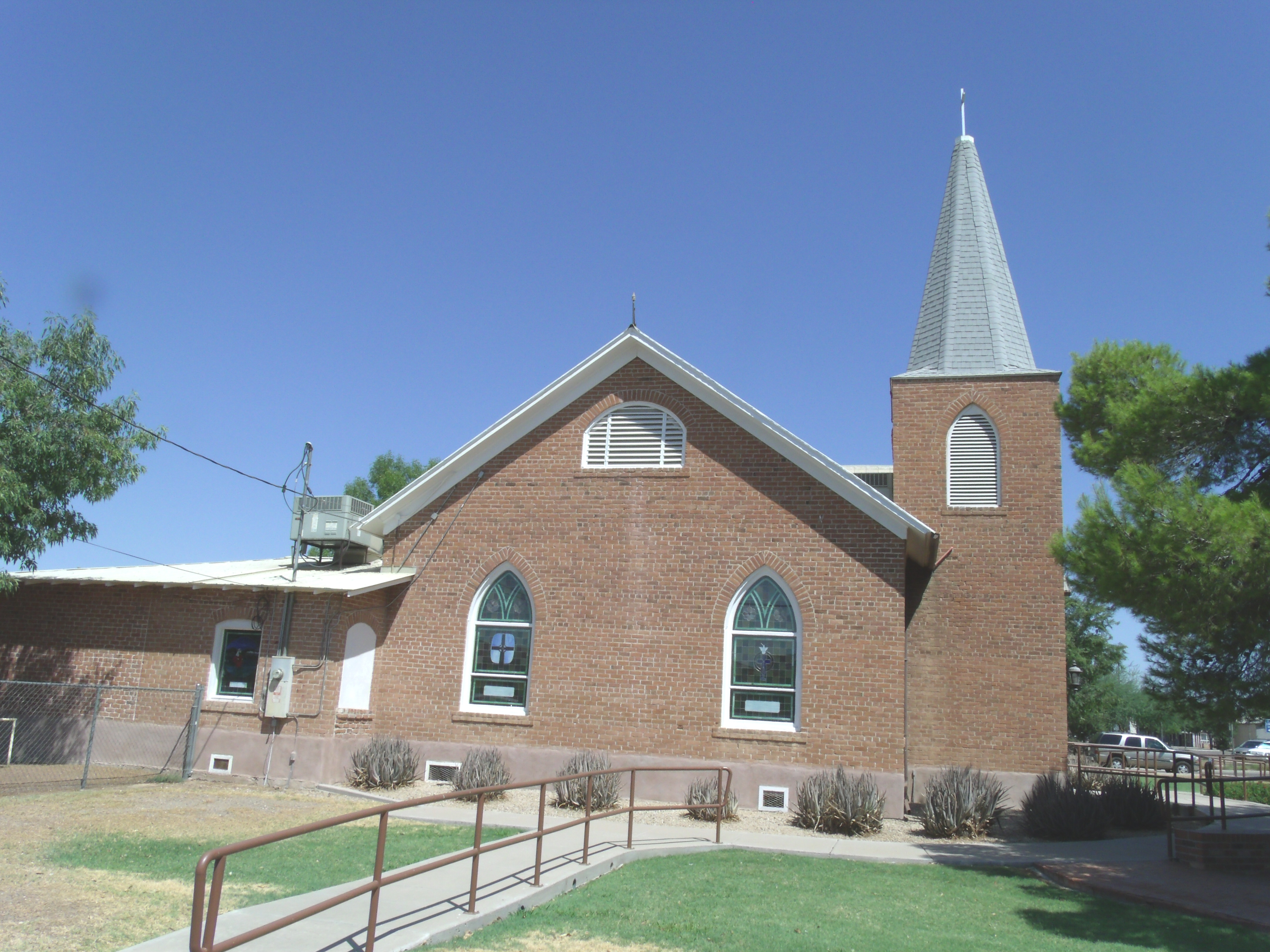
Side view of the Peoria Presbyterian Church.

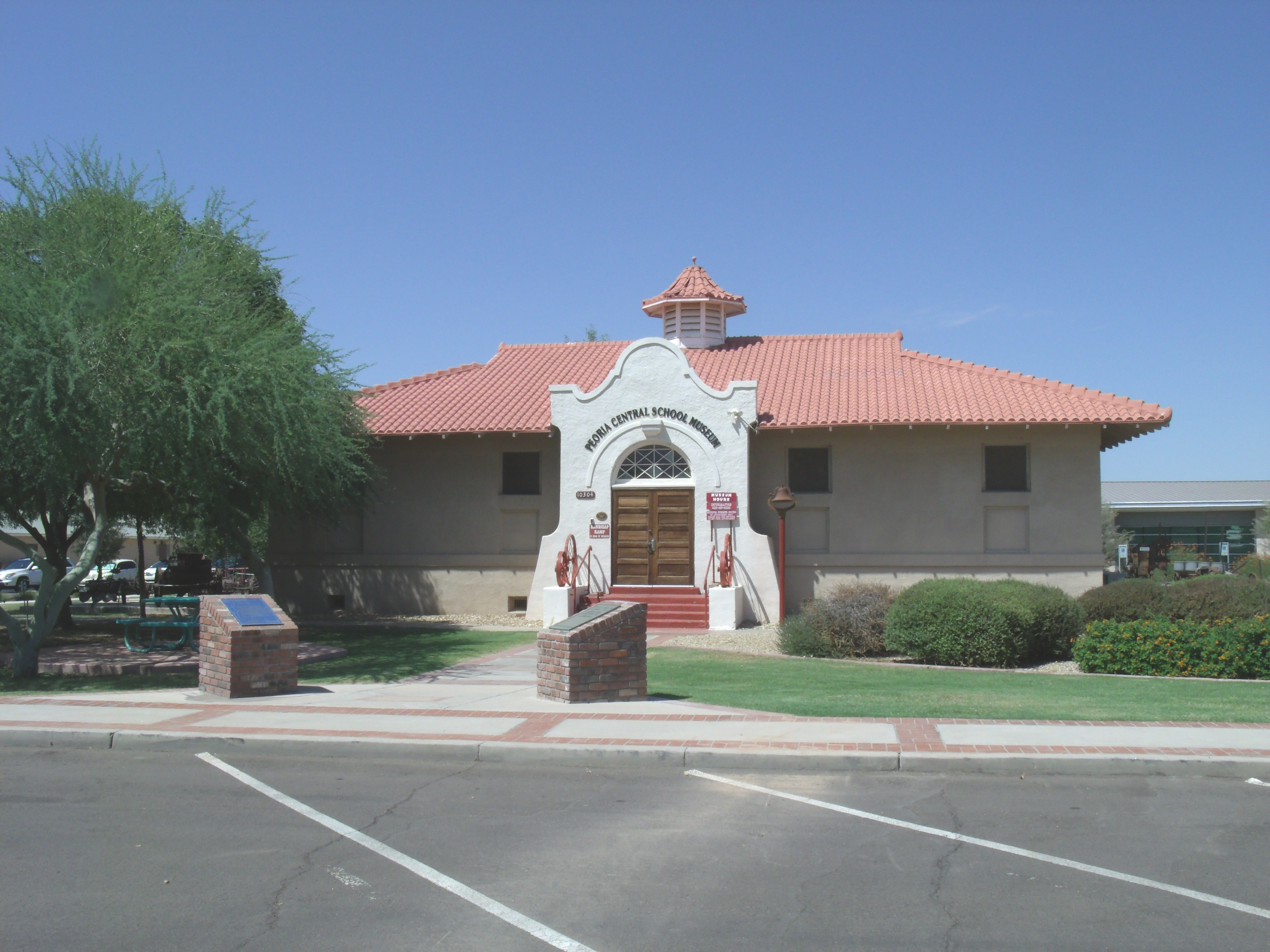
The Peoria Central School

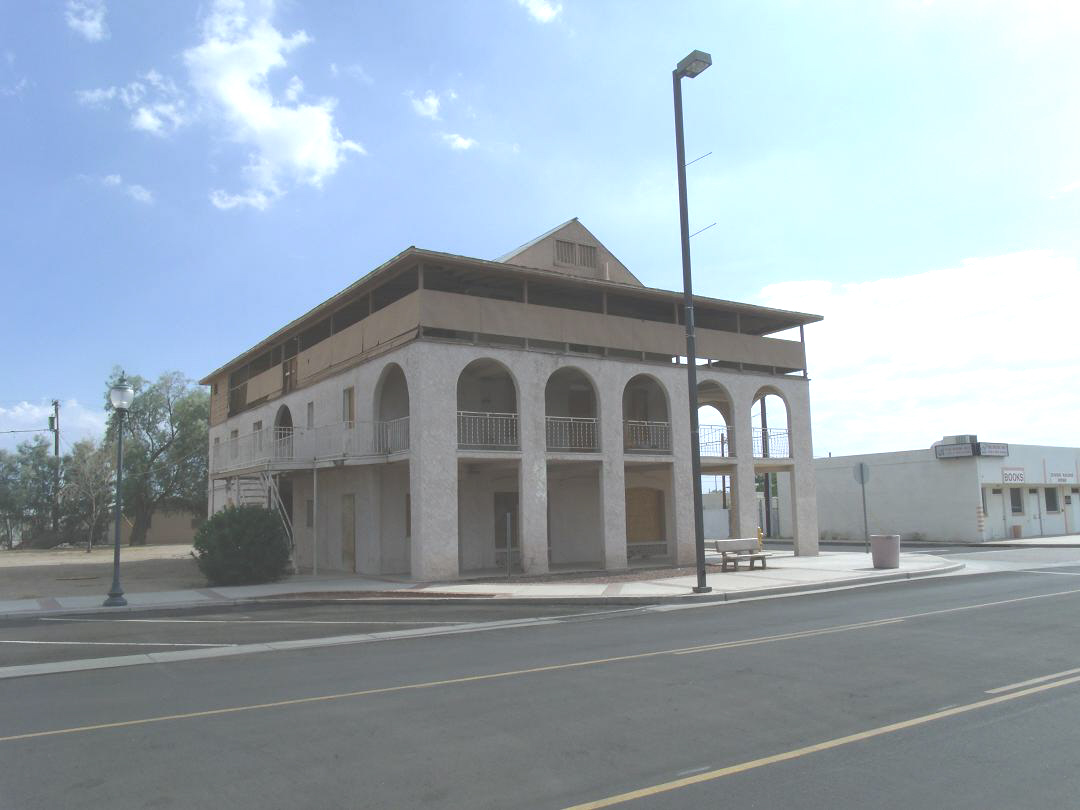
Edwards Hotel

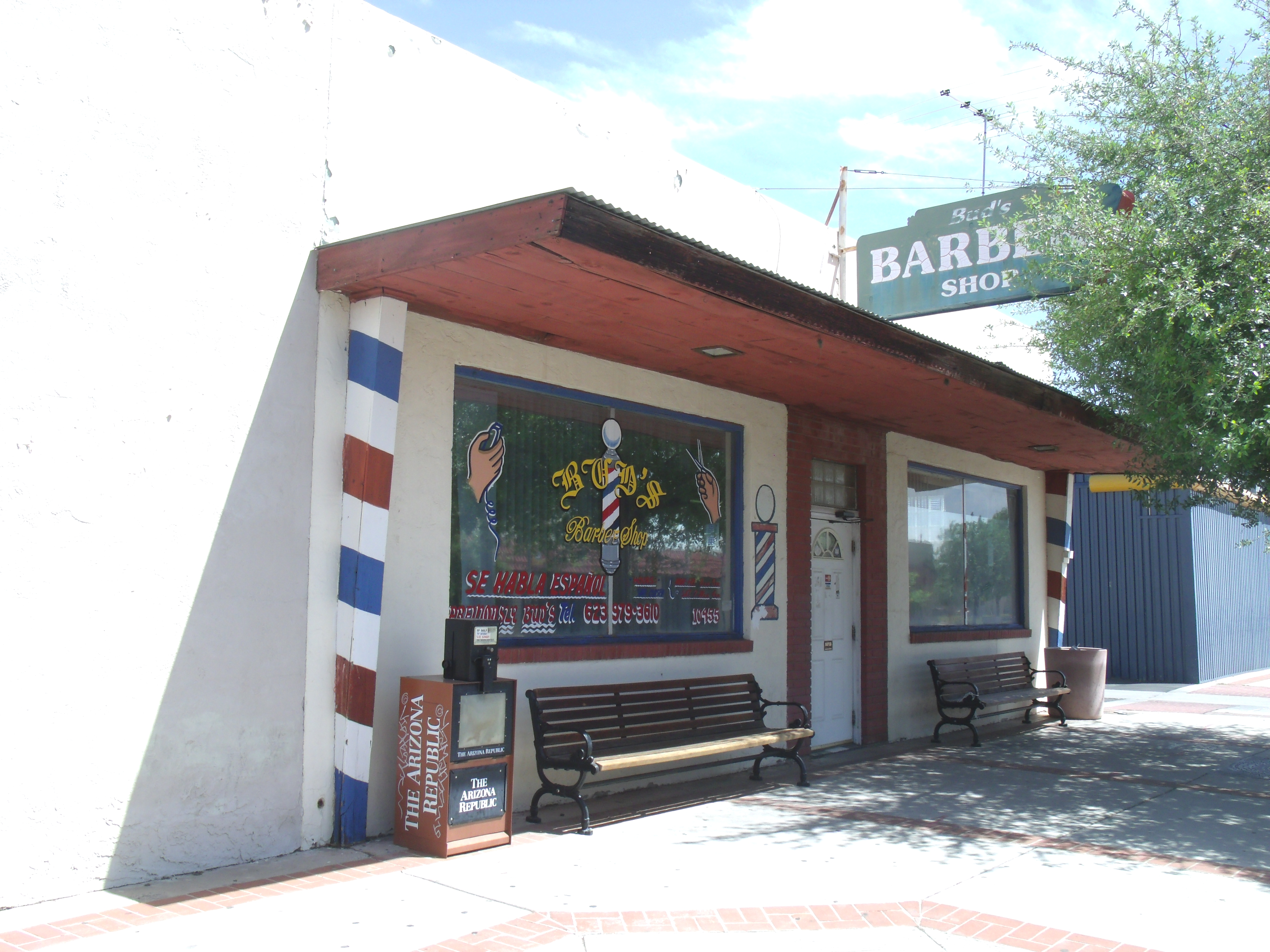
Lazy J. Café and later to Bud’s Barber Shop.

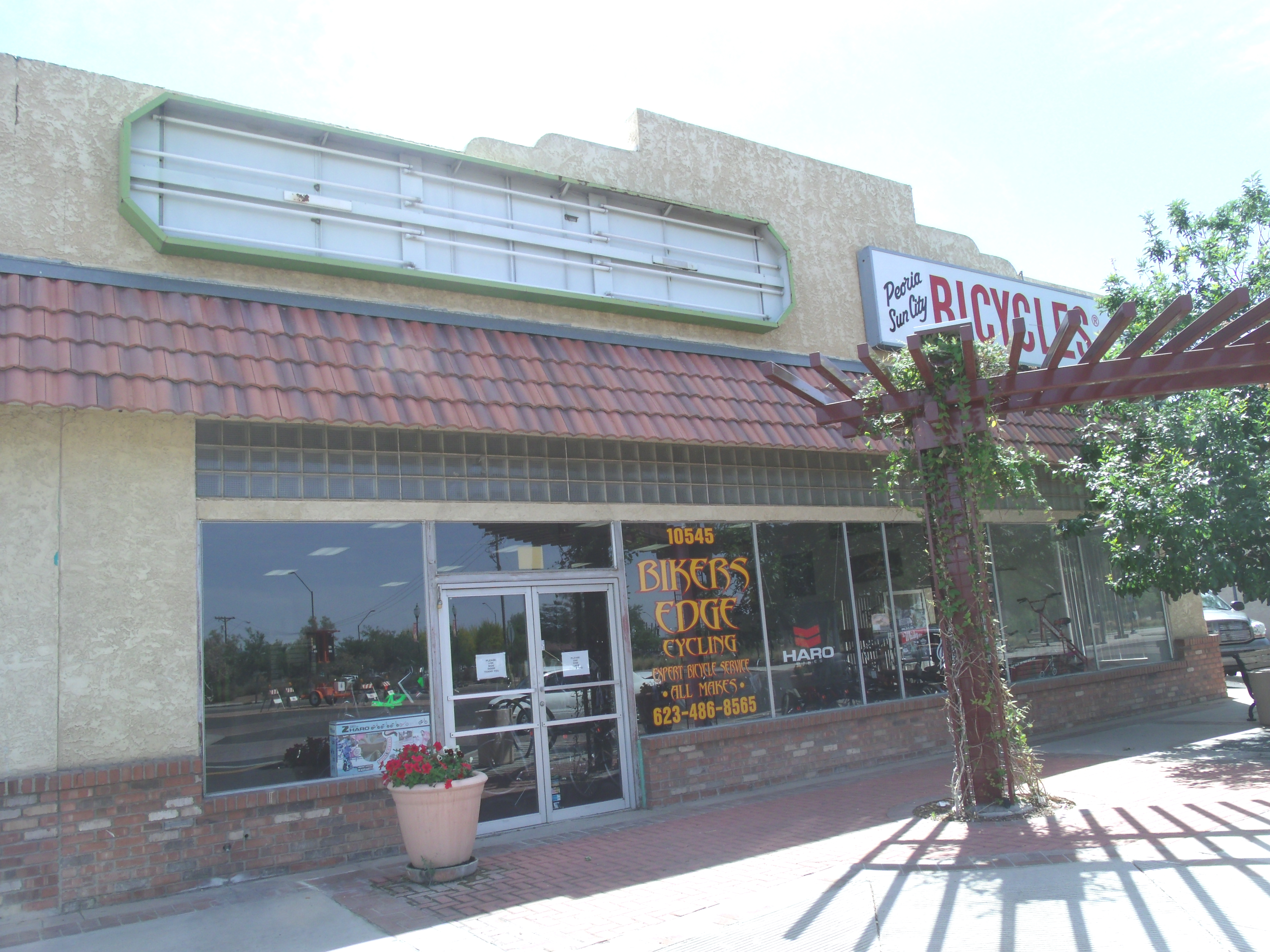
Saliba’s Pay ‘n Takit/Park & Shop

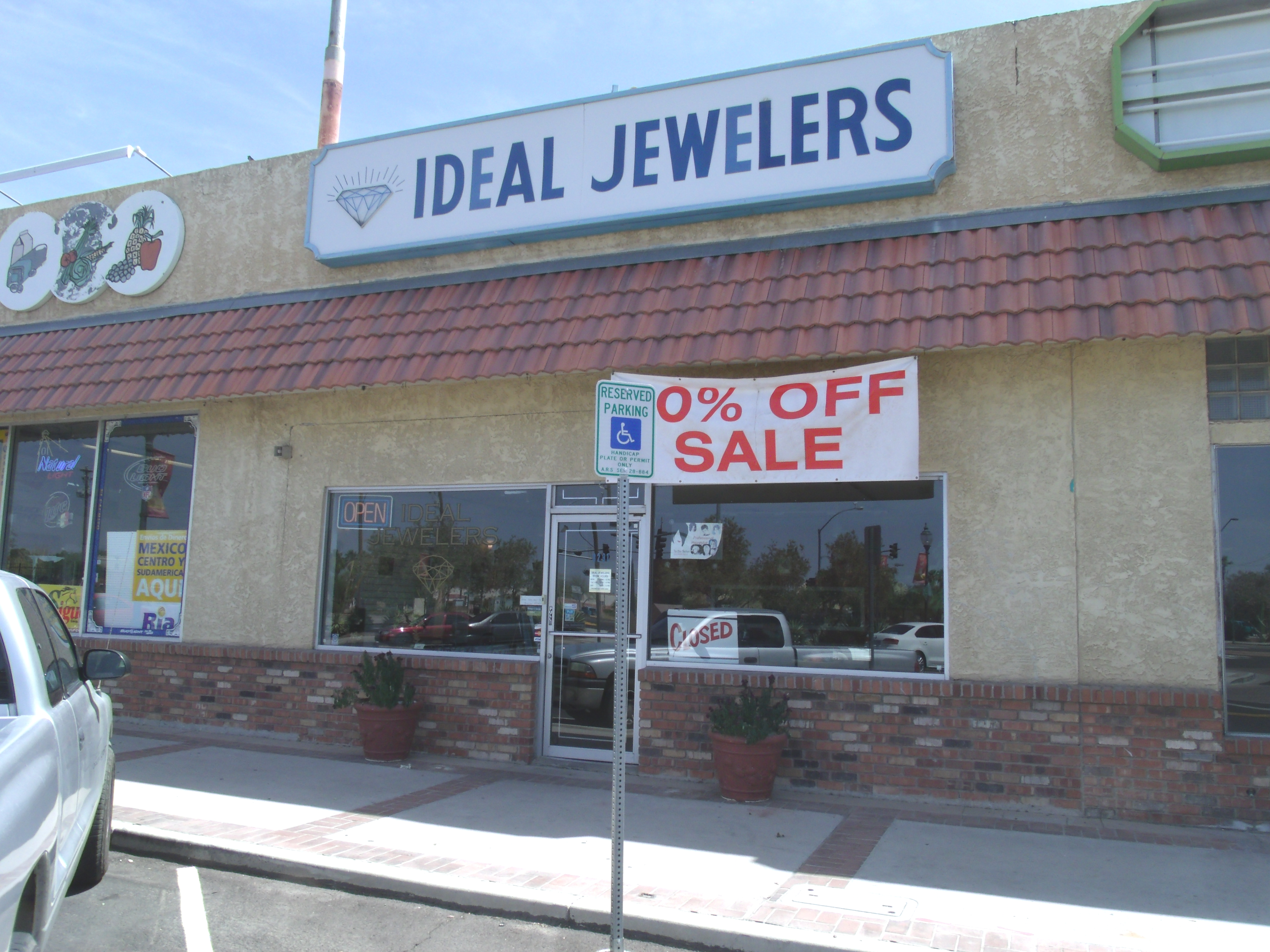
The Arizona Bank

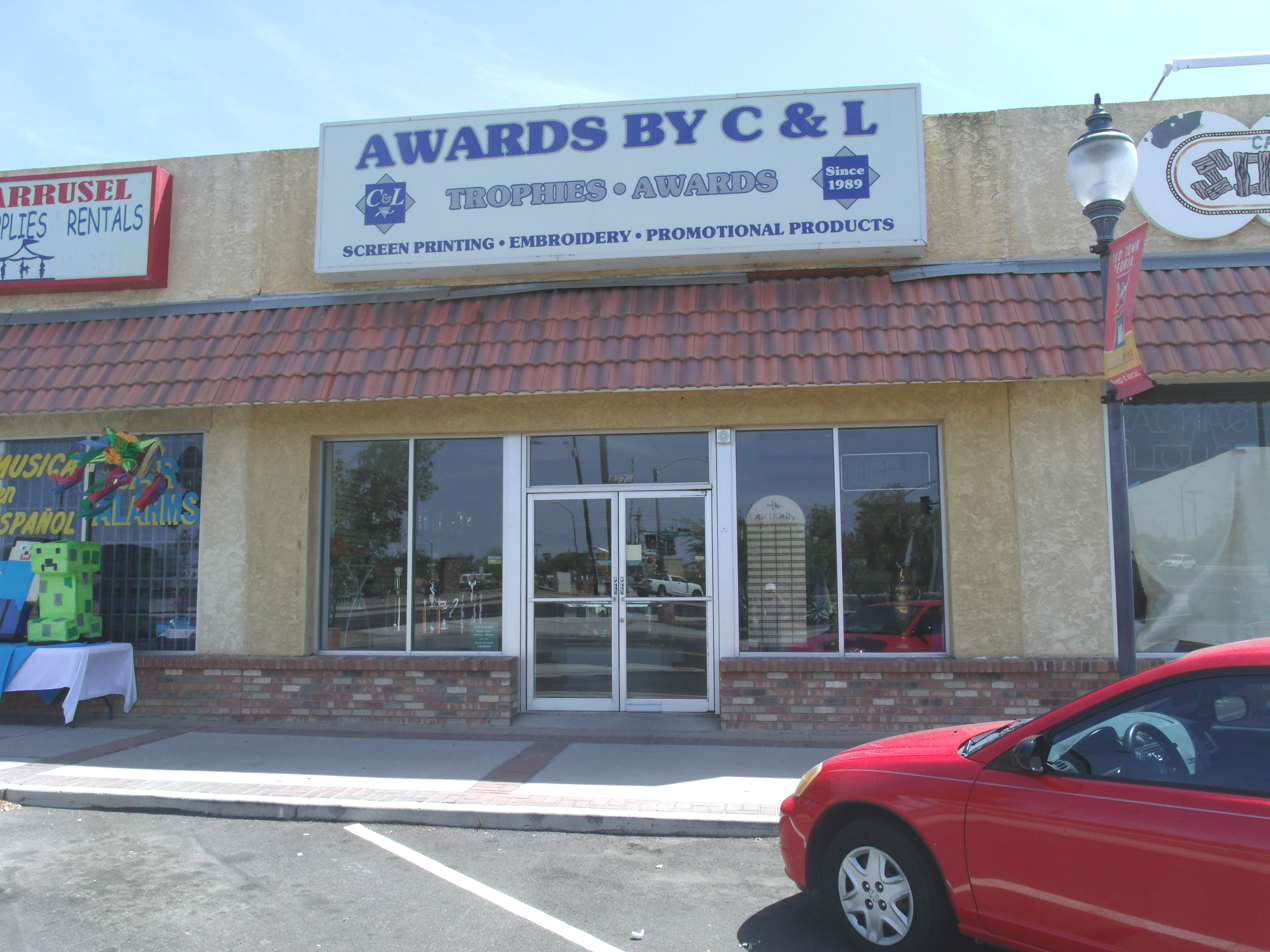
Peoria's Post Office

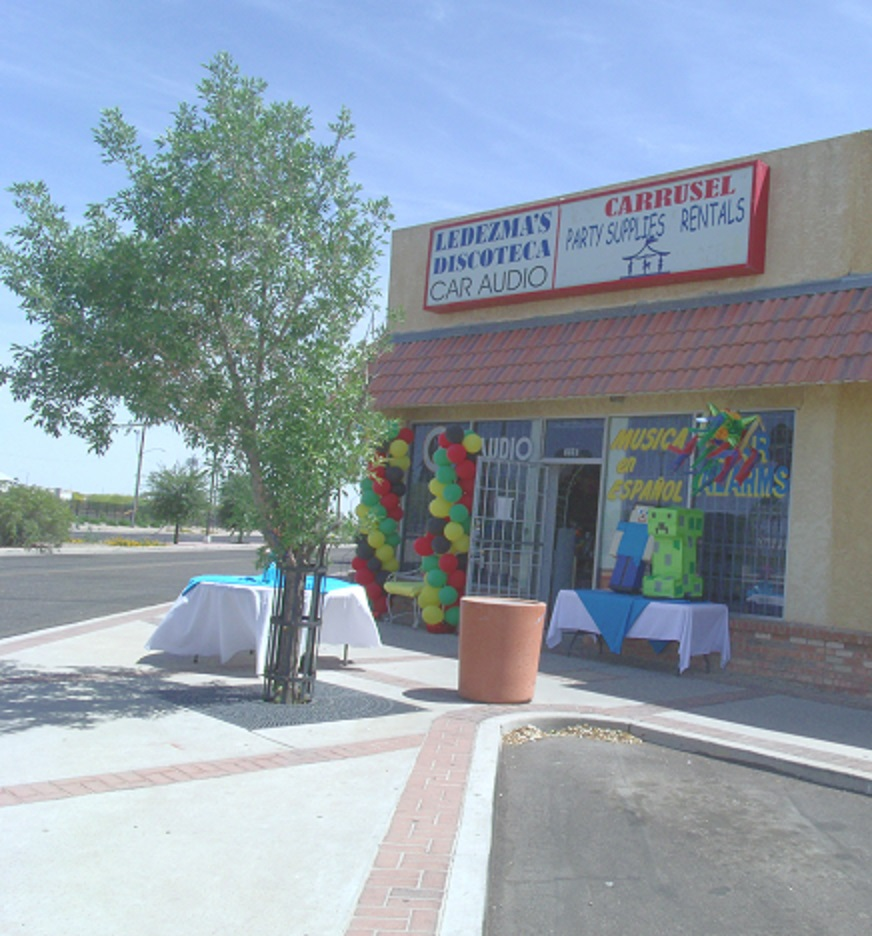
Wood’s Pharmacy

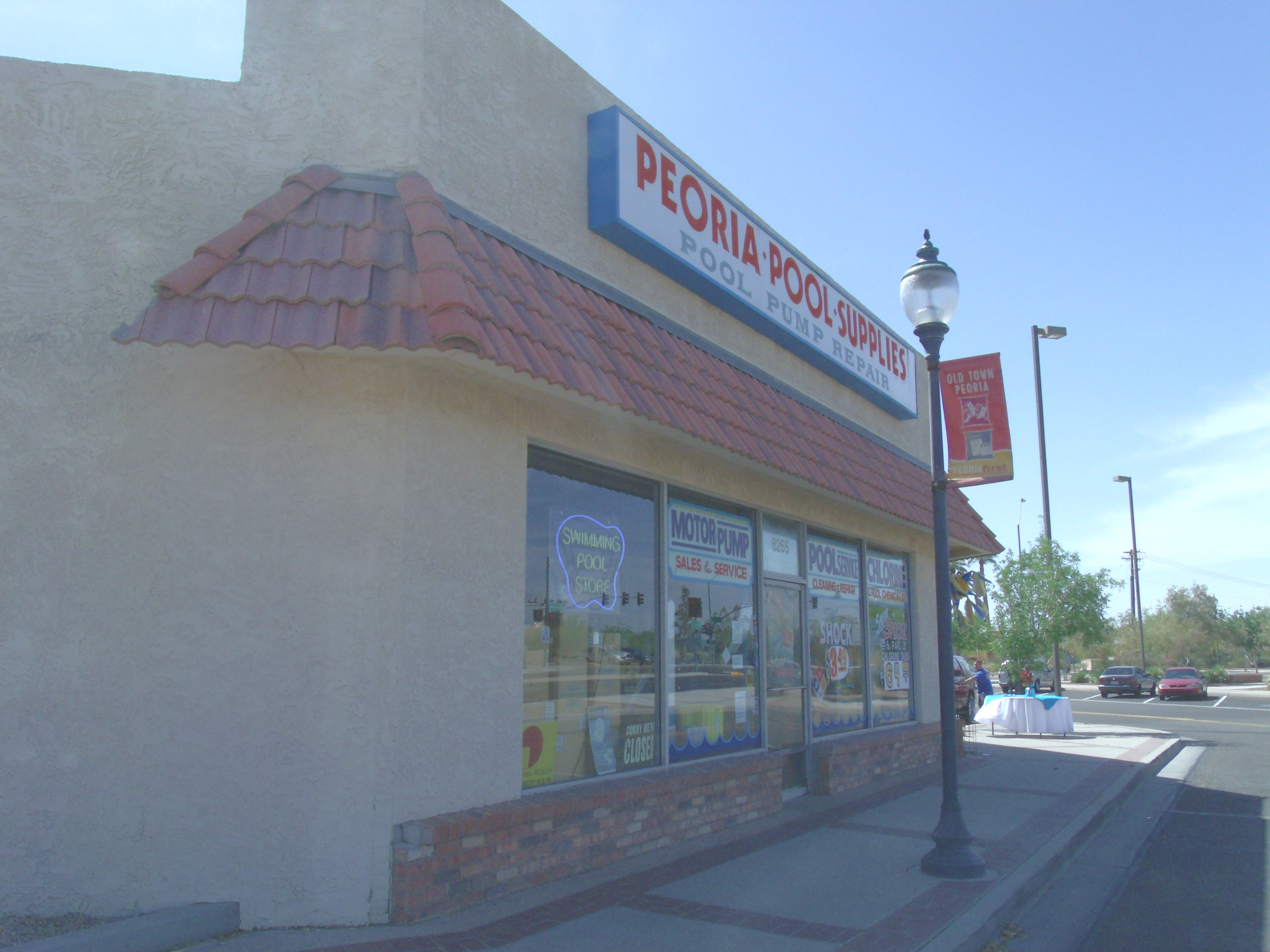
Thurston’s Insurance and Real Estate Company

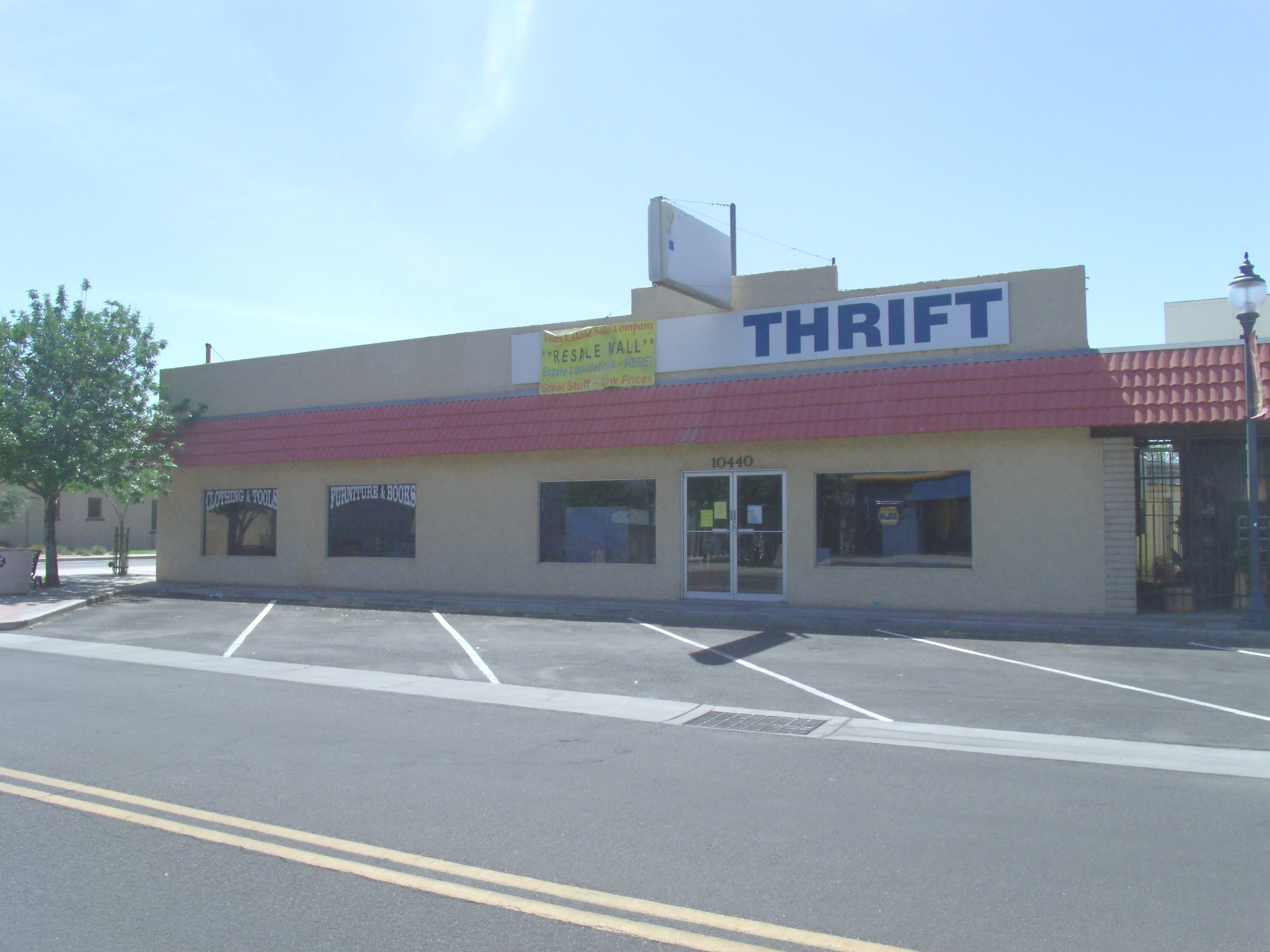
Kosier’s Hardware

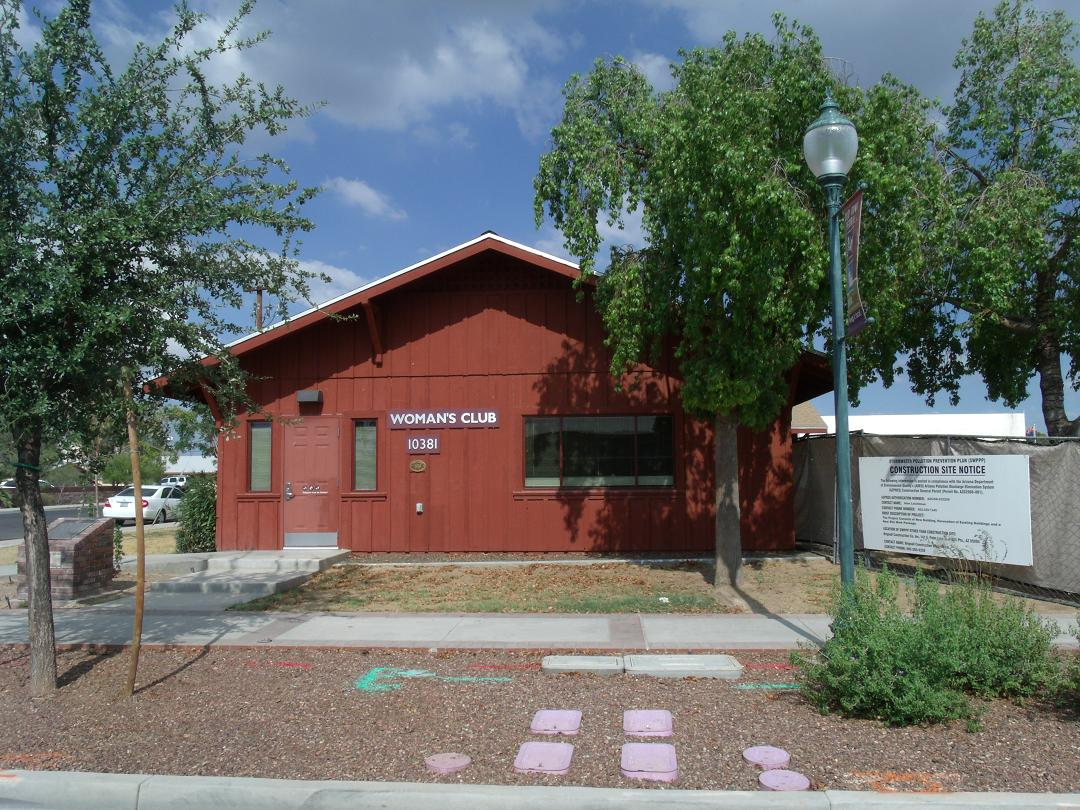
Peoria Women's Club

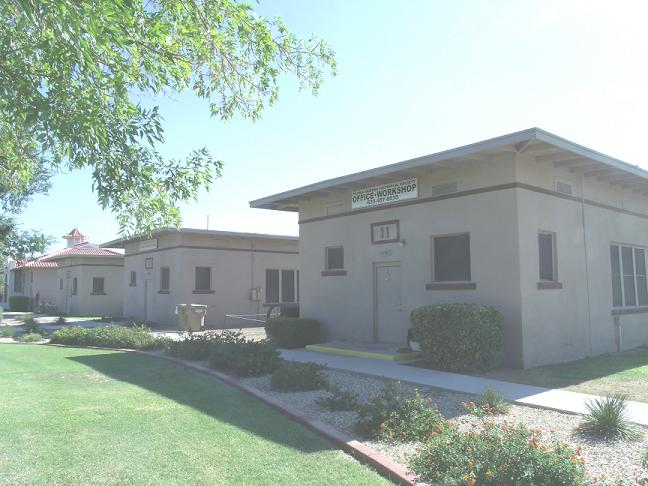
Peoria Central School additions

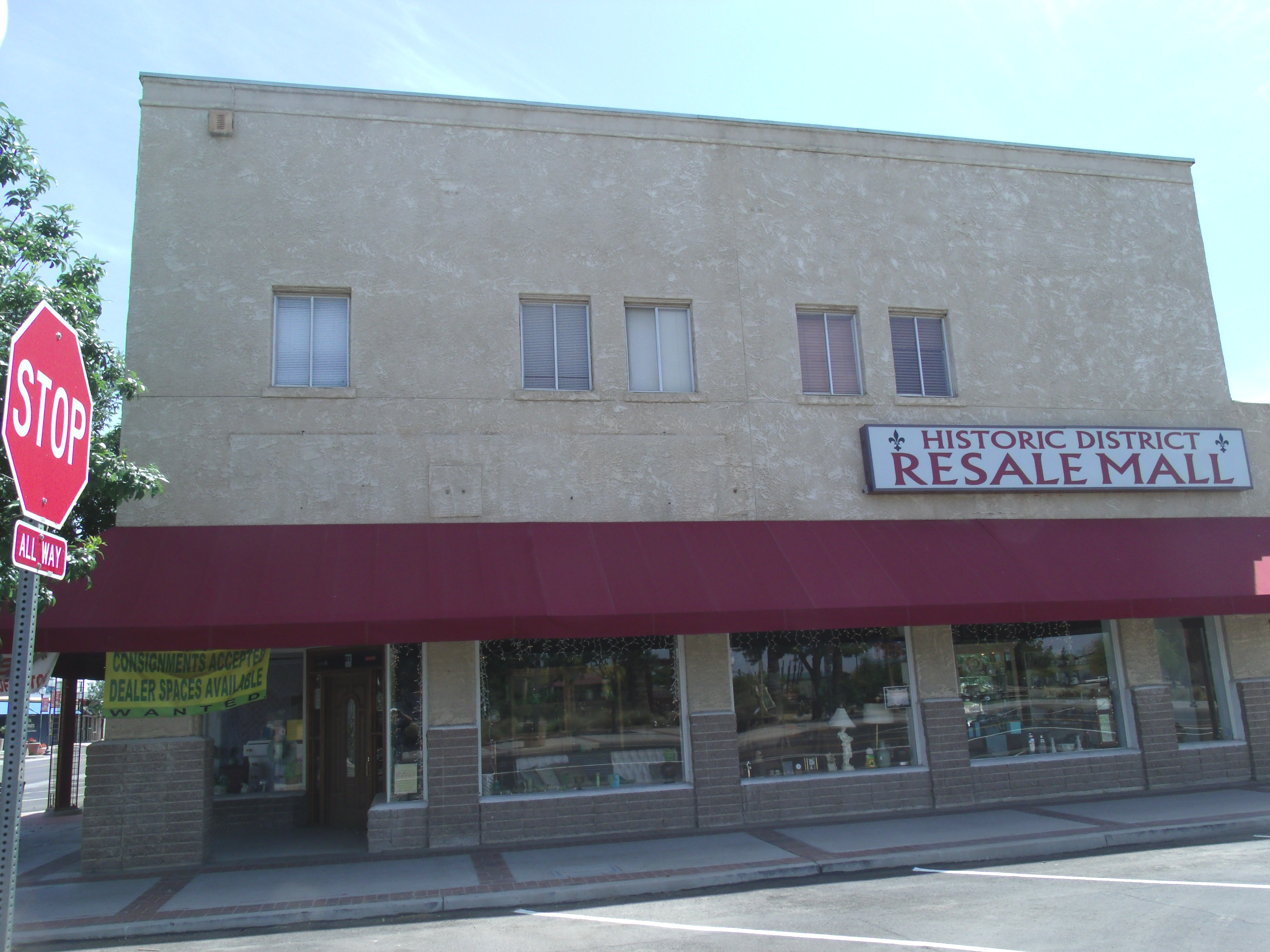
Mabel Hood Building

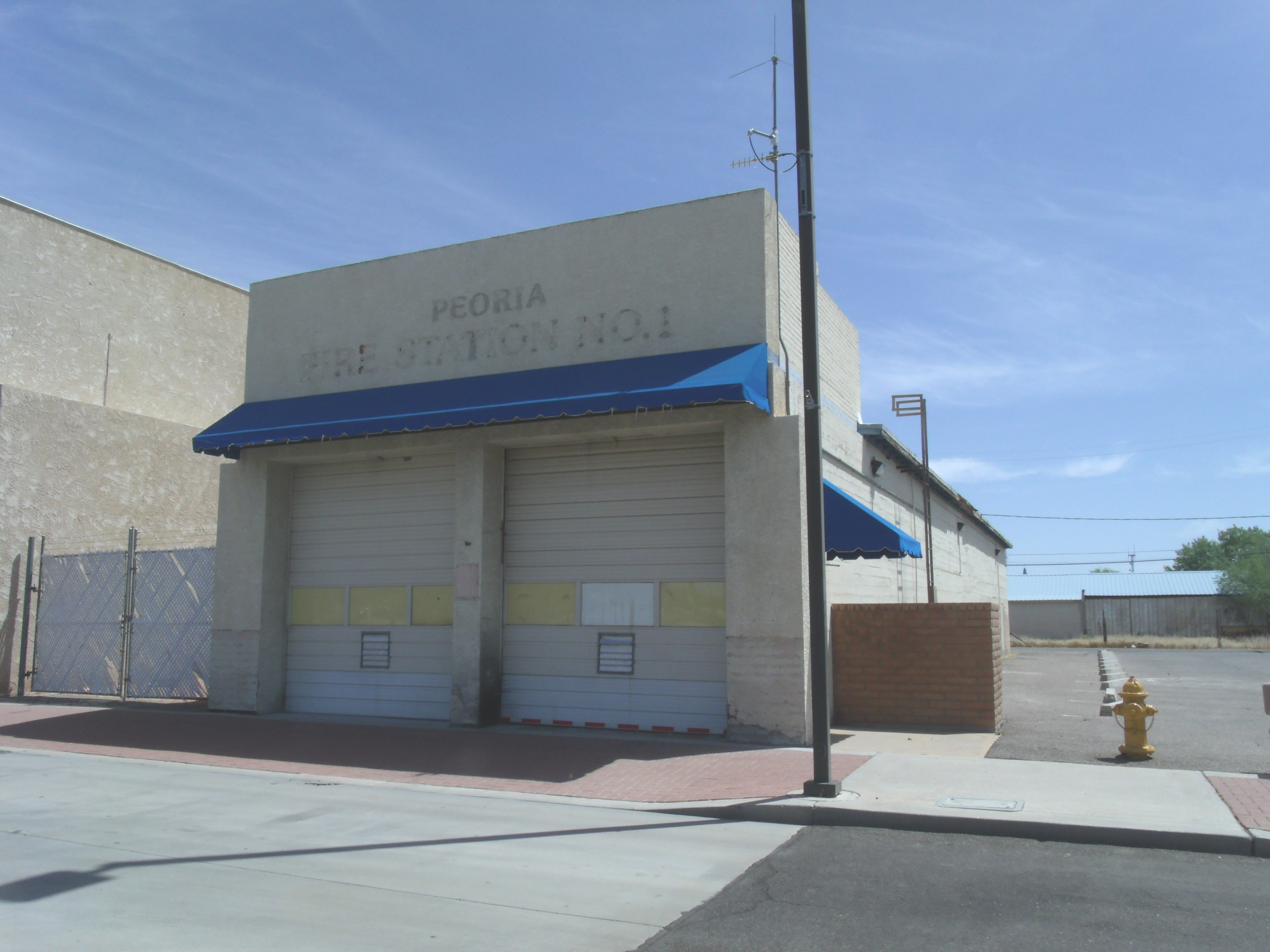
Paramount Theater

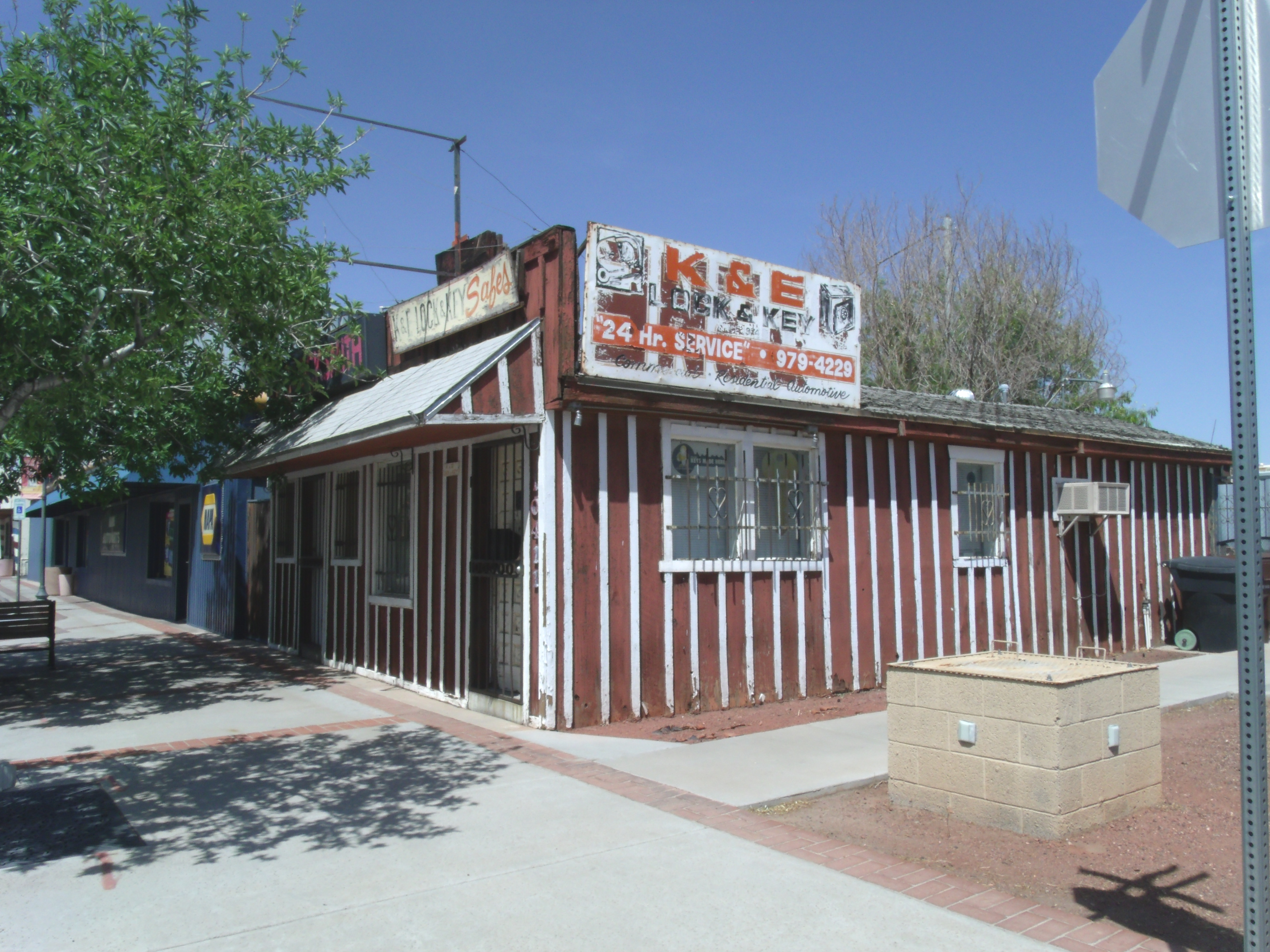
La Tapitia Café

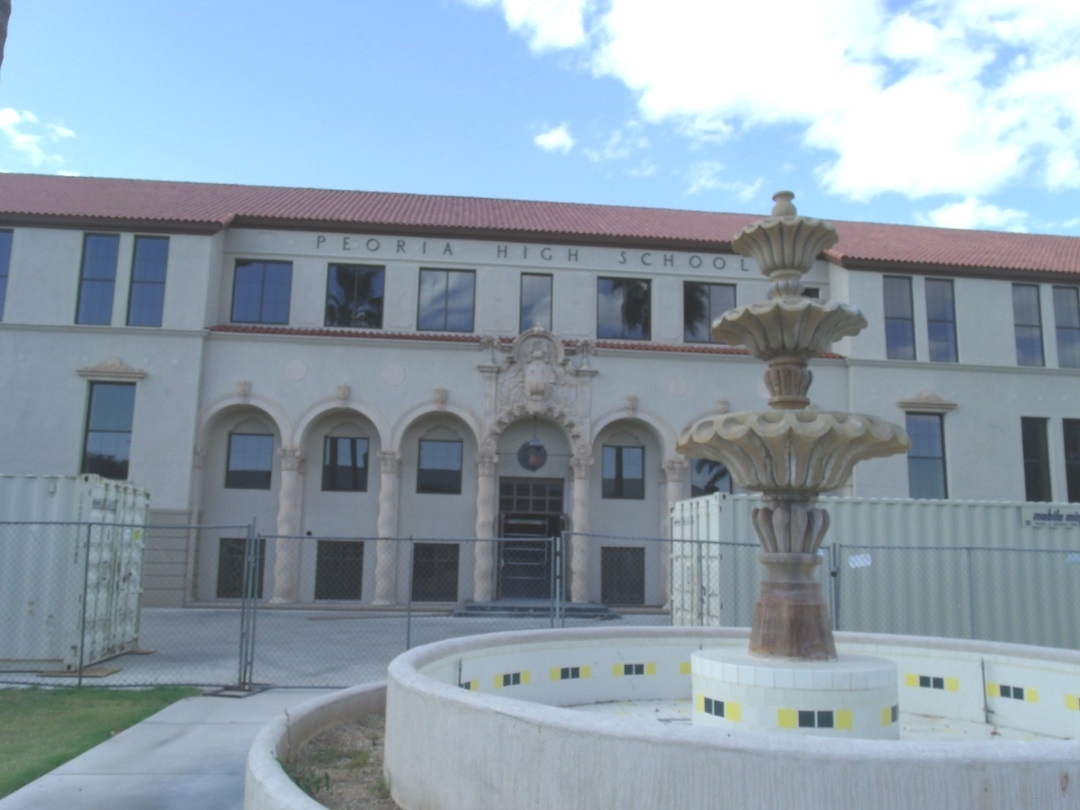
Peoria High School

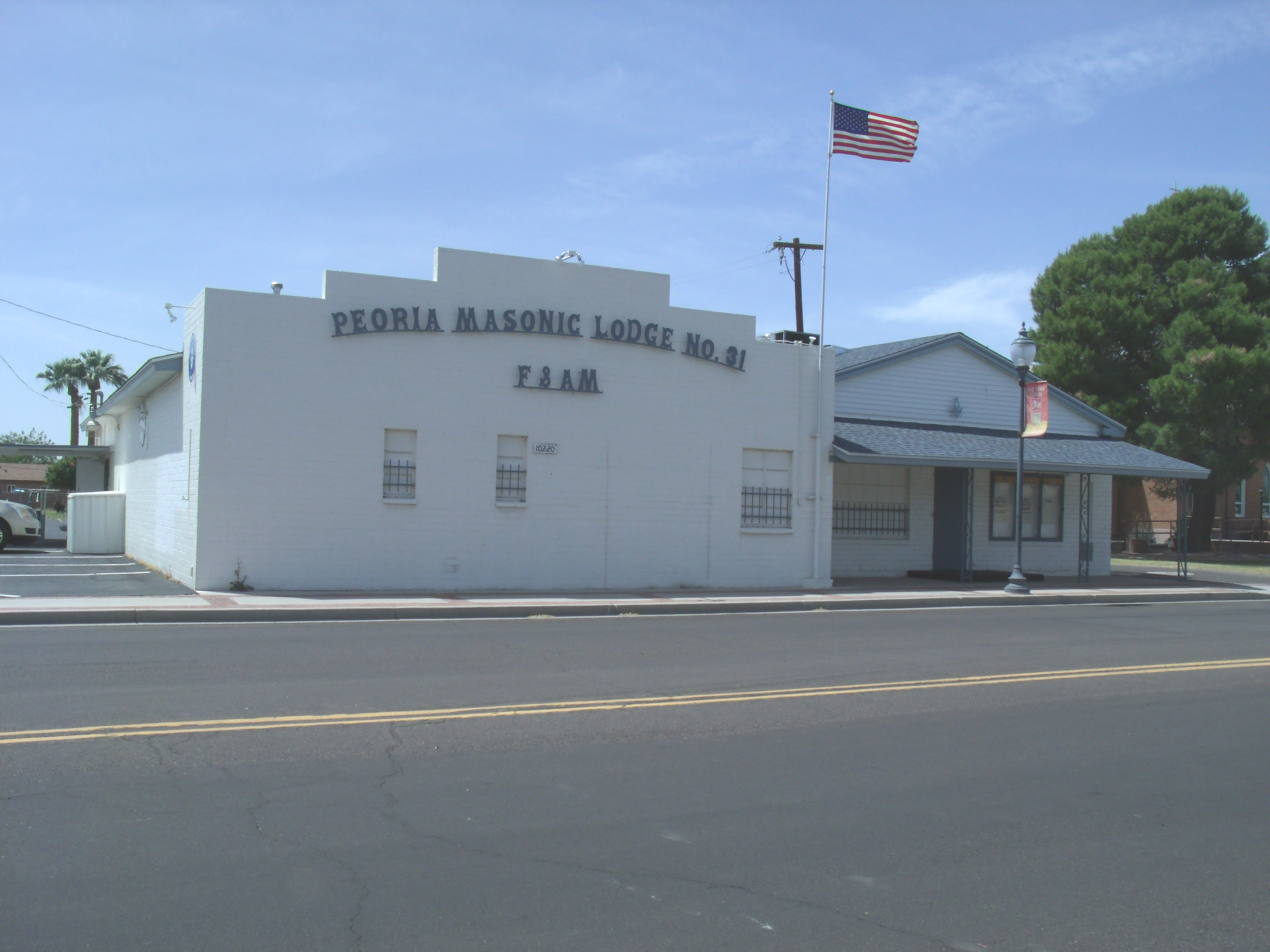
Peoria Masonic Lodge #31

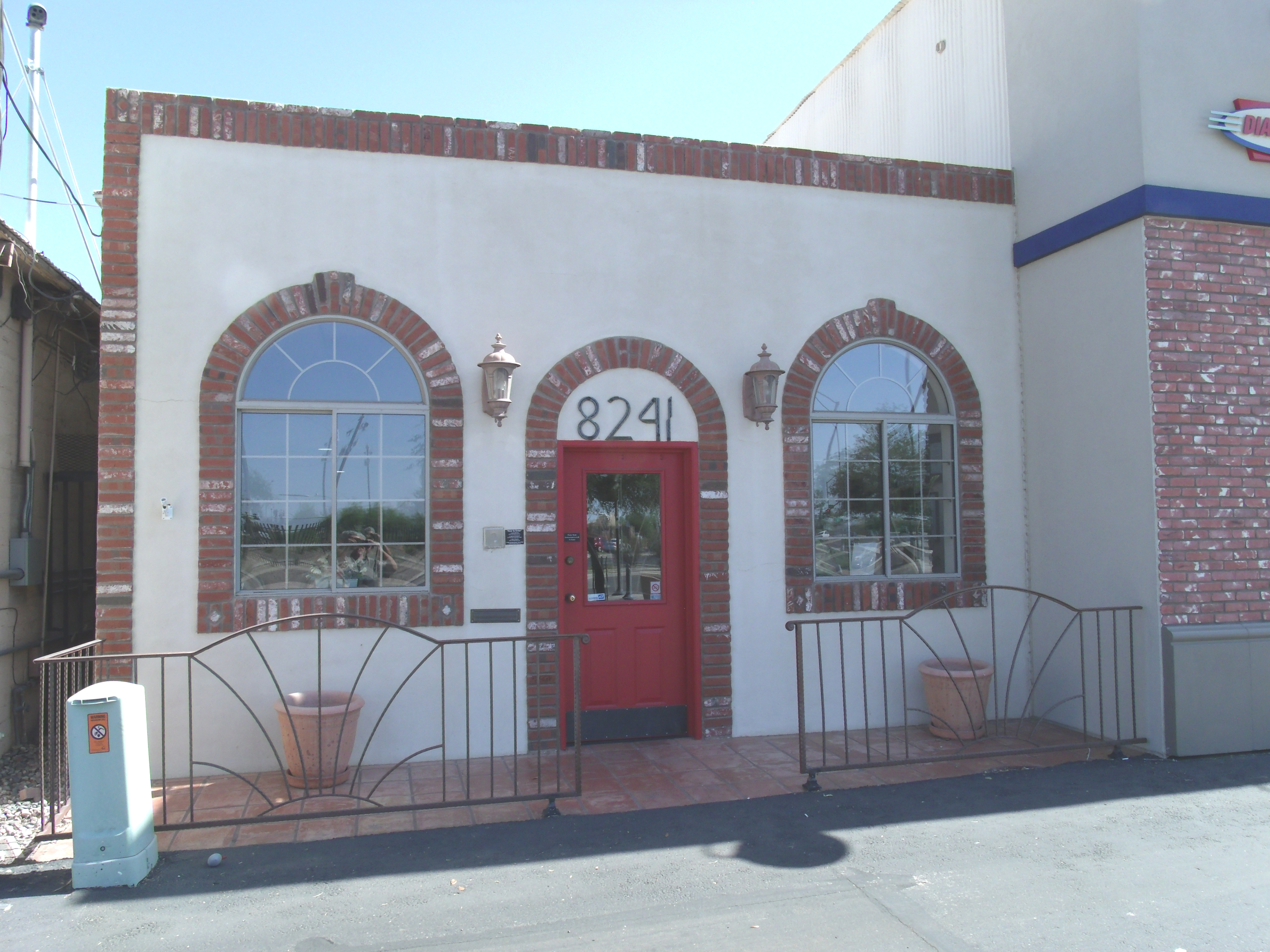
Wilhelm’s Garage Office

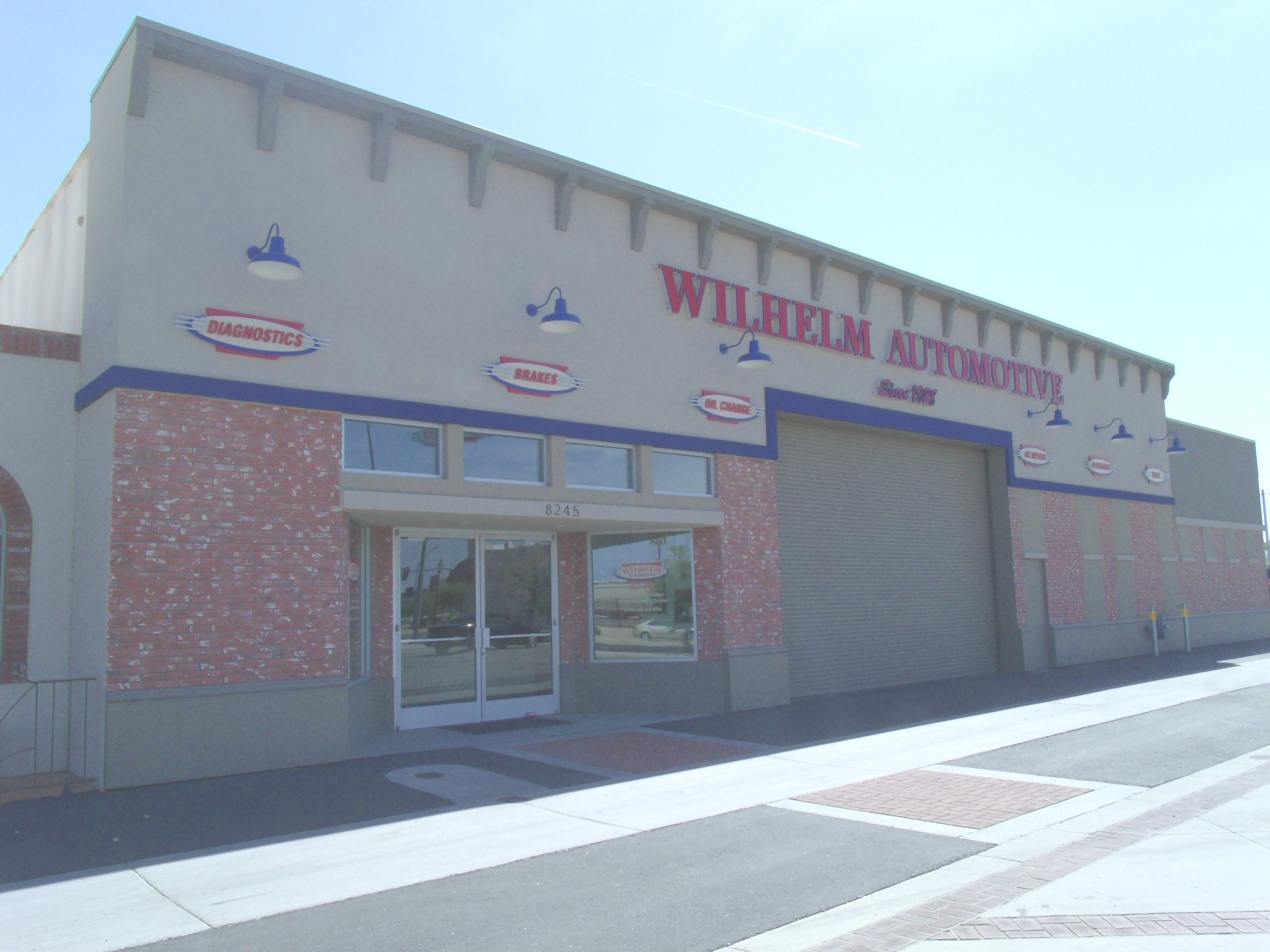
Wilhelm Automotive

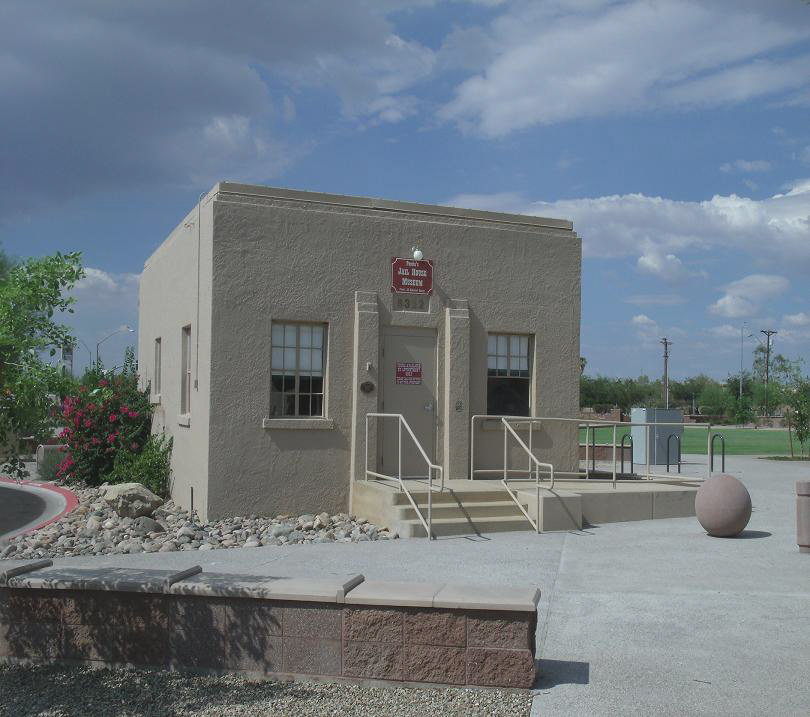
Peoria Jail House

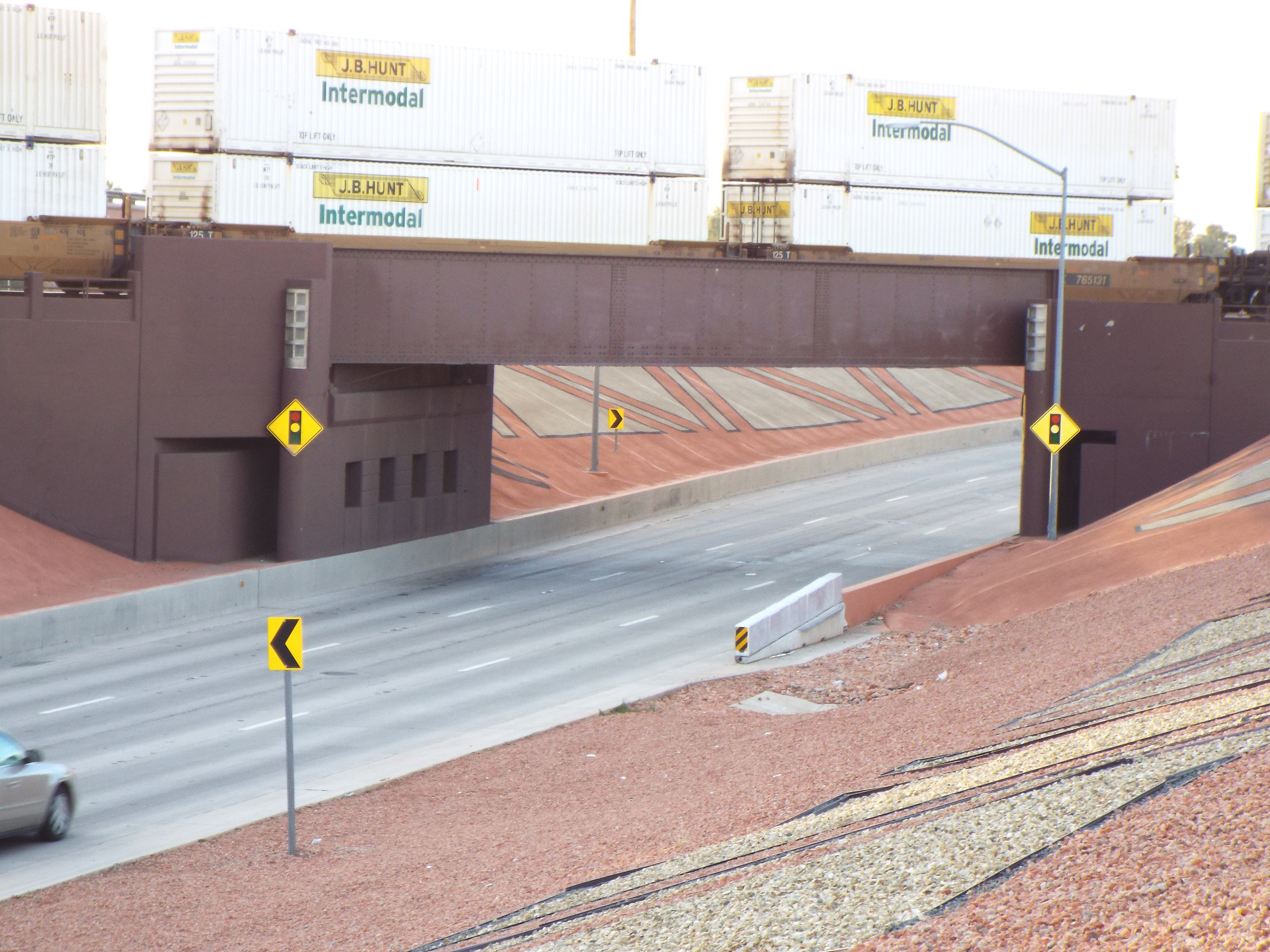
The Peoria Underpass

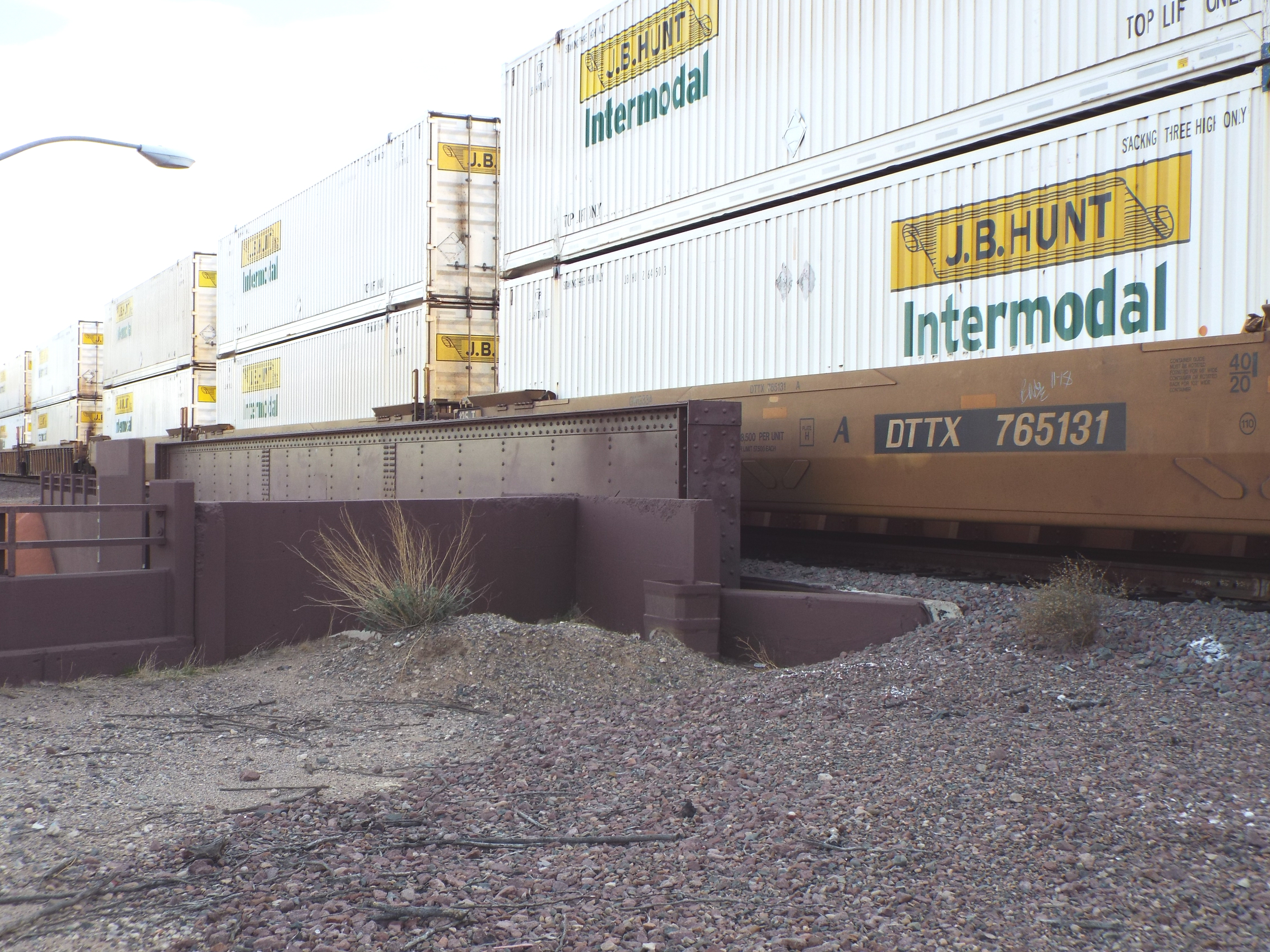
A close up view of the Peoria Underpass.

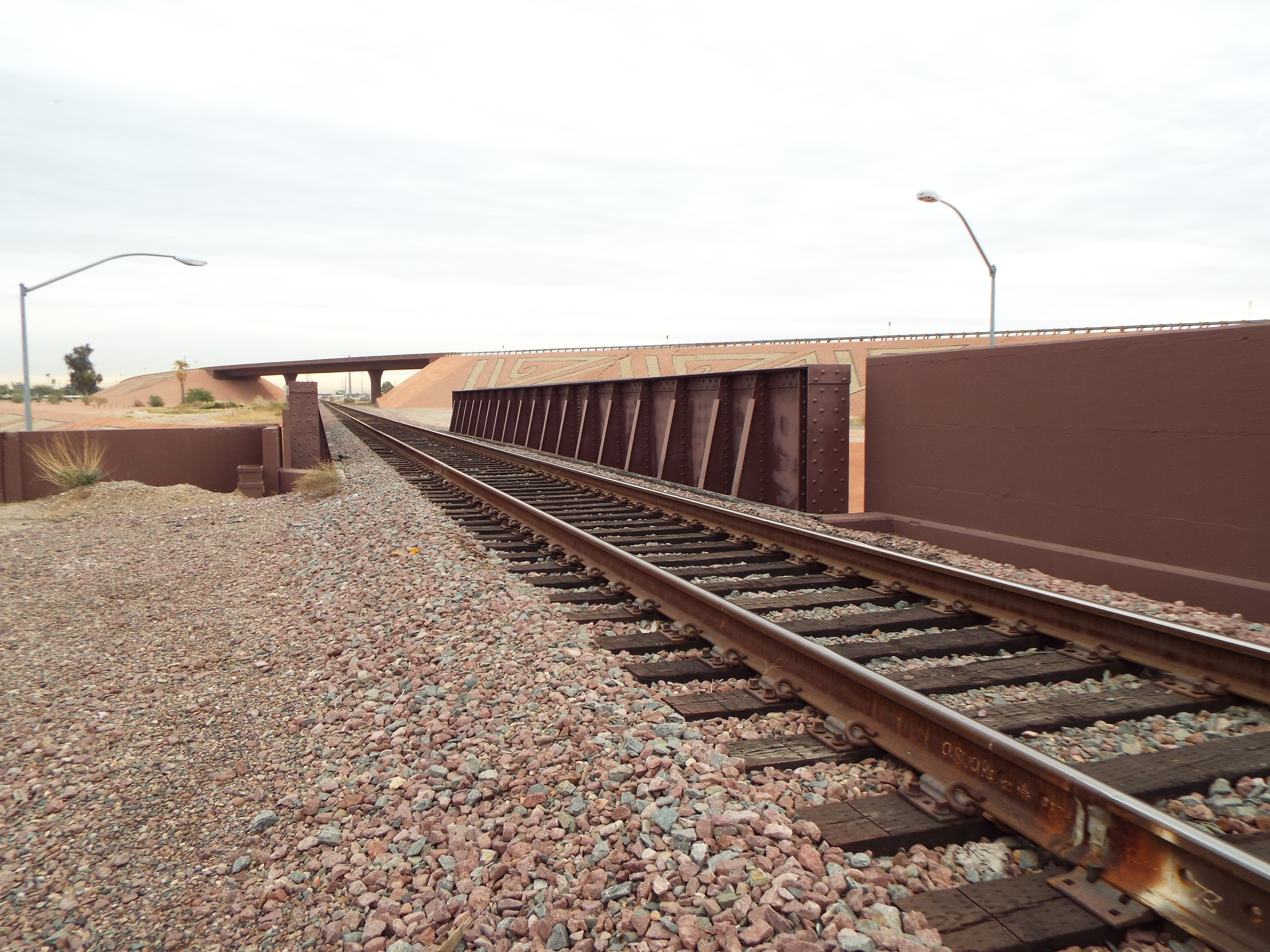
Different view of the Peoria Underpass.

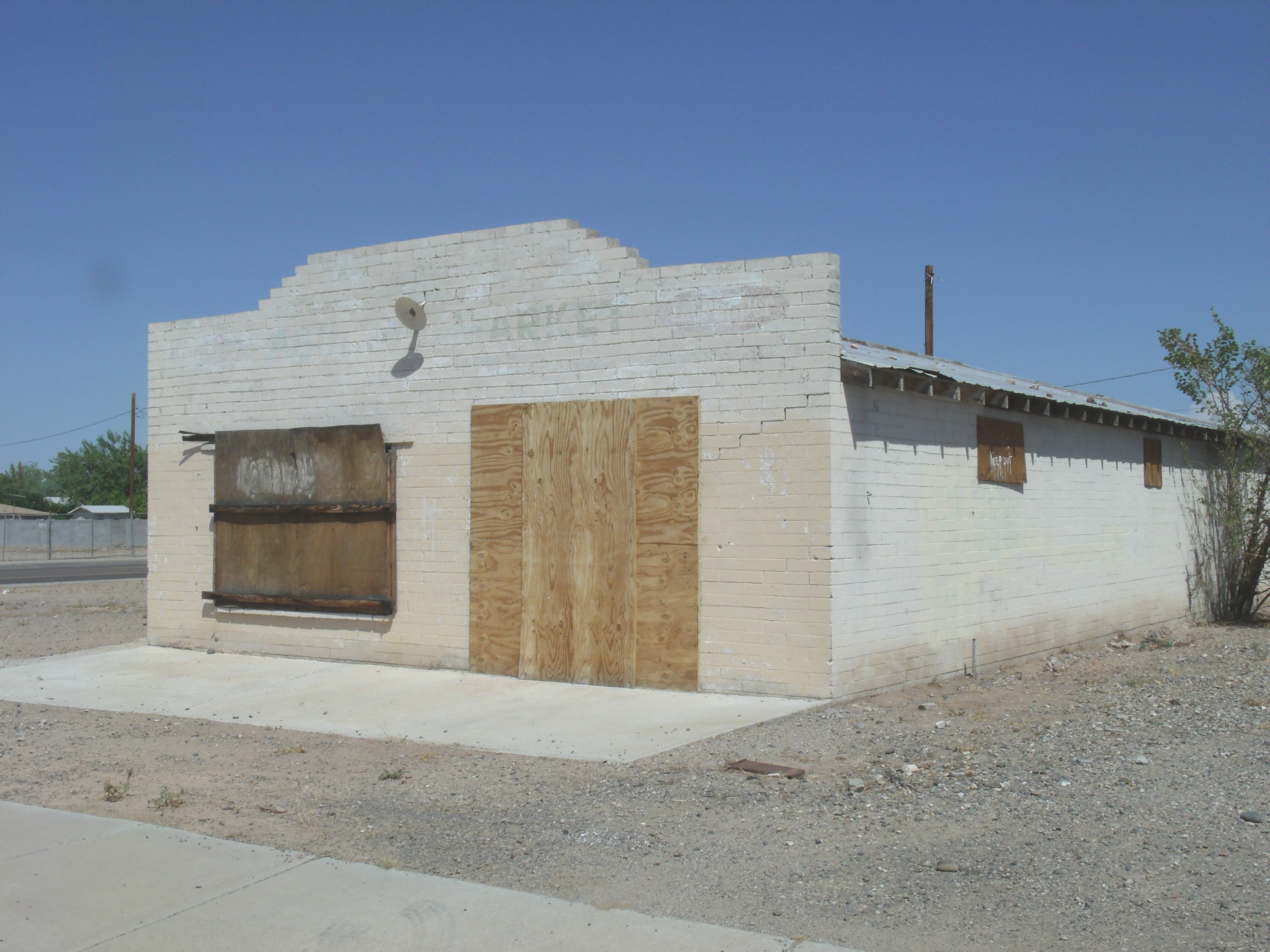
The Quick Stop Groceries store

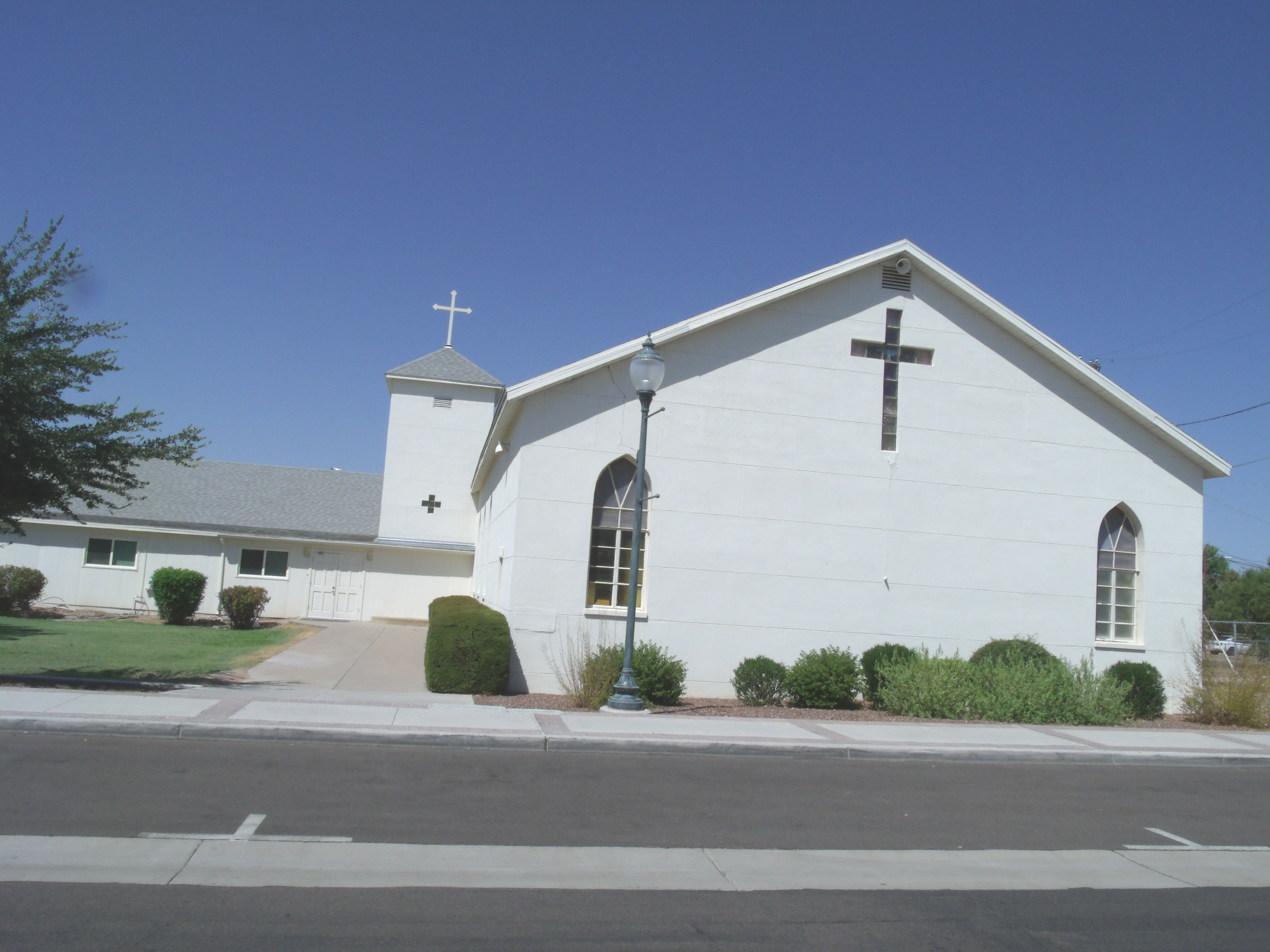
The Peoria Nazarene Church (now The Greek Orthodox Church).

== Houses ==
The following are the images of the historic houses in Peoria and its surrounding areas.

- An 1880s House – Located in Northern Ave. between 75th and 85th Avenues in Peoria, Az. This is one of the oldest houses within the extended boundary of Peoria.
- Another 1880s House – Located in Northern Ave. between 75th and 85th Avenues in Peoria, Az. This *The Kosier House (bungalow) – The house is among the oldest remaining residences in the original Peoria townsite. It was built in 1912 and is located at 8210 W. Madison St.. It was owned by the Kosier family, proprietors of Kosier's Hardware Store. Conley Kosier served as Mayor of Peoria from 1957 to 1959.
- The Castillo House – The house was built in 1915 and is located at 8180 Monroe St. It is listed in the Peoria Register of Historic Places.
- The Gillis House – The house was built in 1918 and located at 8241 W. Madison St. It was owned by Edna Gillis, a Peoria Elementary School teacher.
- The Mason House – The house was built in 1919 and is located at 8246 W. Madison St.. It was owned by the Wilhelm family, owner/operators of Wilhelm's Garage located on Grand Avenue.
- The Sosnoskie House – The house was built in 1905 and is located at 8210 W. Monroe St.. It is the oldest remaining residence in the Old Peoria Townsite.
- The Vickery/Belarde House – The house was built in 1920 and is located at 8190 W. Monroe St.. Charles Vickery, the original owner of this property, was the proprietor of Woods Pharmacy. Charles K. Vickery from 1955 to 1957 served as Mayor of Peoria.
- The Edmiston House – The house was built in 1920 and is located at 10275 N. 82nd Ave.. The bungalow is one of the few original brick homes remaining in the area.
- The Latham/Meeker House – The house was built in 1920 and is located at 8270 W. Madison St., The house belonged to the Latham family who were in the cotton ginning business. It was later sold to the Meeker family.
- The Deatsch House – The house was built in 1920 and is located at 8238 & 8240 W. Madison St.. It was the home of the Deatsch Brothers, owners of the Deatsch Brothers Hardware Store. It has river rock posts and exposed roof rafters.
- Shanty Houses – A row of 1920s former Shanty Houses in Peoria, Az. The houses are located in Northern Ave. between 75th and 85th Avenues within the extended boundary of Peoria.
- The C.A. Robinson House – The house was built in 1922 and is located at 8211 W. Madison St.. The craftsman-bungalow style house was home to C.A. Robinson, a prominent businessman, and his wife, who was the first president of the Peoria Women's Club.
- The Coor House – The house was purchased from a mail-order catalog and shipped to Peoria by rail. It was built in 1923 and is located at 8255 W. Madison St.. The owner, Pat Coor, was Peoria's first barber and ran the Peoria Barber Shop.
- The Meyer House – The house was built in 1925 and is located at 8491 Madison St. It is listed in the Peoria Register of Historic Places.
- The Peddicord House – The house was built in 1925 and is locates at 8453 Washington St. It is listed in the Peoria Register of Historic Places.
- The Lebarion House – The house was built in 1929 and is located at 8415 Madison St. It is listed in the Peoria Register of Historic Places.
- The Roach House – The house was owned by Bill Roach. It was built in 1929 and is located at 8276 W. Madison St.. Roach was a janitor at the Peoria Elementary School and the "waterman" for the city. As a waterman, Mr. Roach was responsible for seeing that the town's water meters were properly maintained.
- The Vazquez House – The house was built in 1930 and is located at 8344 Monroe St. It is listed in the Peoria Register of Historic Places.
- The Turner Apartments – The apartments were built in 1935 and are located at 8280 & 8286 W. Madison St.. They were owned by the Turner family who lived upstairs and ran a carpentry business from a workshop downstairs.
- The Sullivan House – The house was built in 1936 and is located at 8254 W. Madison St.. It was owned by Mr. Sullivan, an agent for the Santa Fe Railway Company and manager of Western Union.
- The McCoy House – The house, which is covered by bushes, was built in 1938 and is located at 8433 Jefferson St. It is listed in the Peoria Register of Historic Places.
- The Lopez House – The house was built in 1947 and is located at 8290 W. Monroe St. This property was home to several Peoria school teachers.
- The Camacho House – The house was built in 1947 and is located at 8238 Monroe St. It is listed in the Peoria Register of Historic Places.
- The Saliba House – The house was built in 1948 and is located at 8276 W. Monroe St., belonged to the Saliba family, owners of the then local grocery store called Saliba's Pay 'n Take It and Saliba's Park 'n Shop.
Historic houses in Peoria's Old Townsite
(PRHP=Peoria Register of Historic Places-listed)
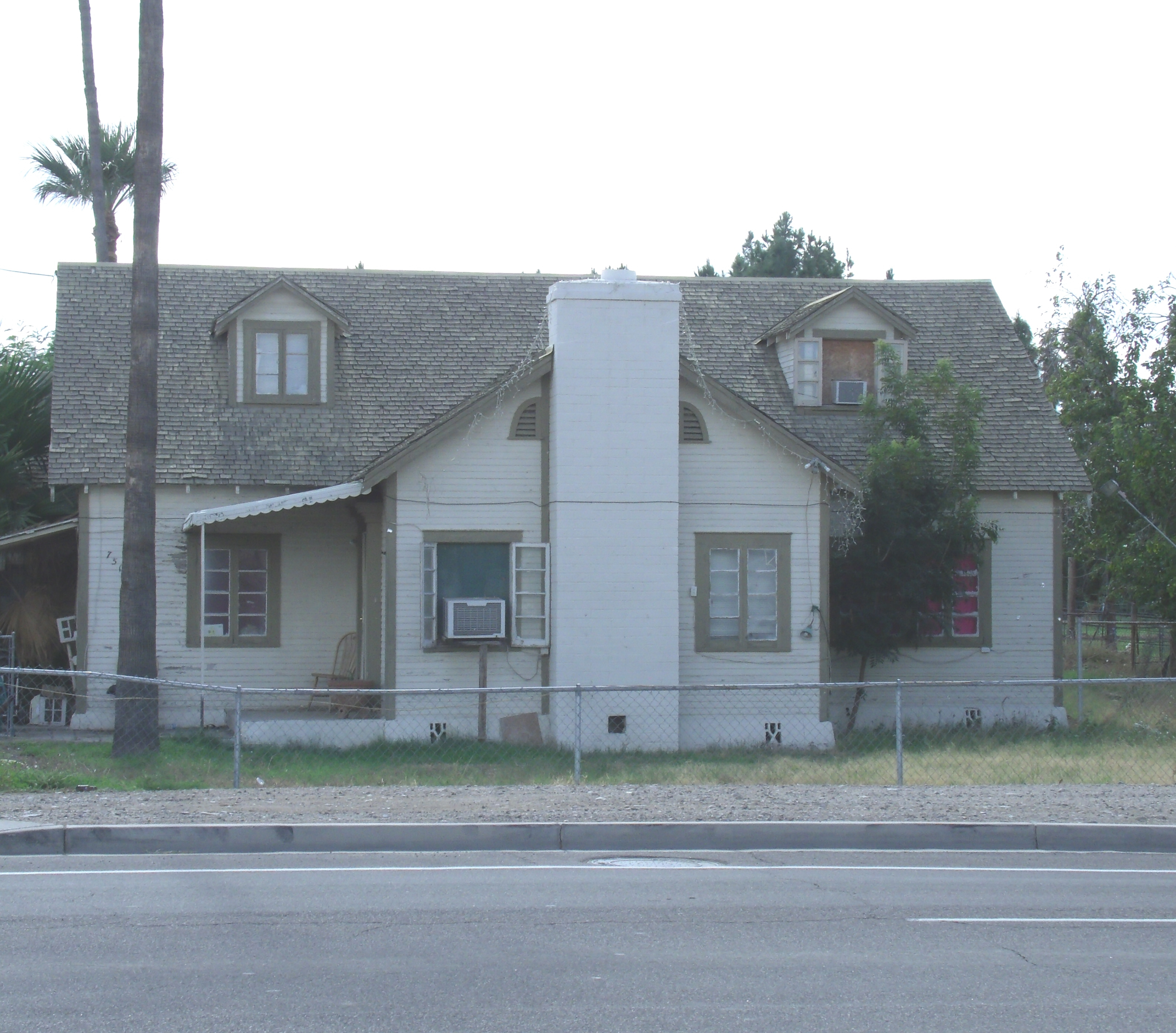
An 1880s House

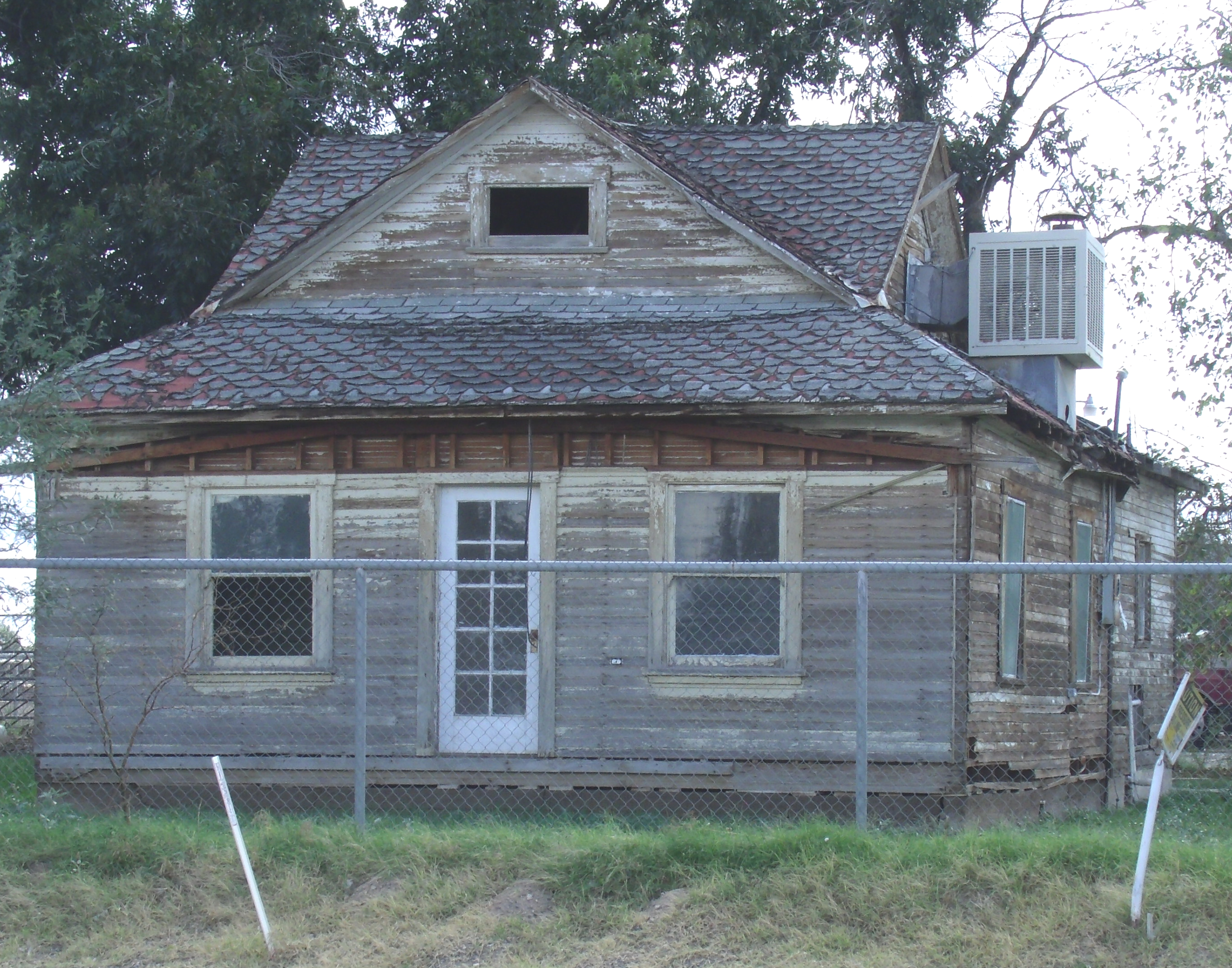
Another 1880s House

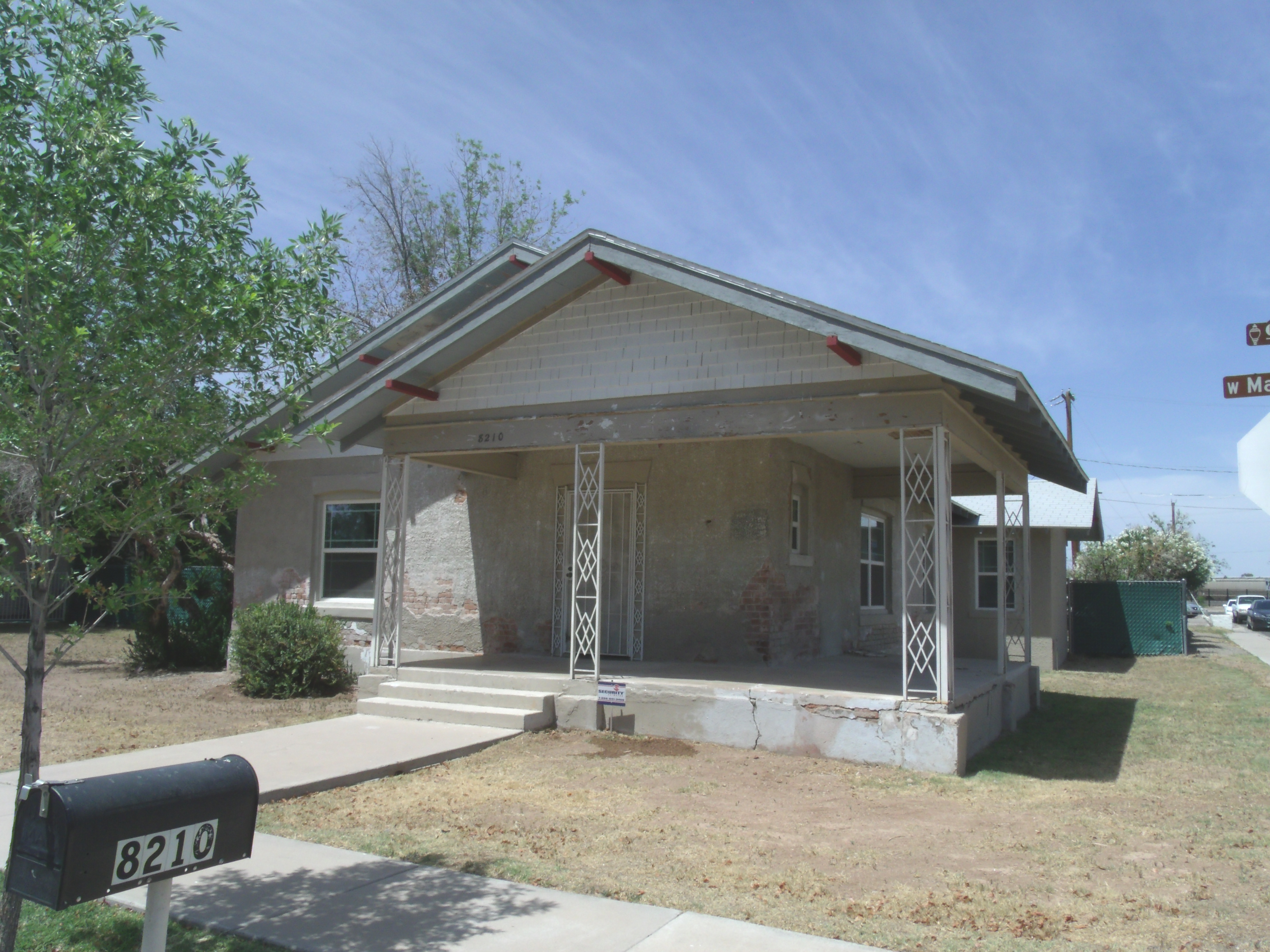
The Kosier House

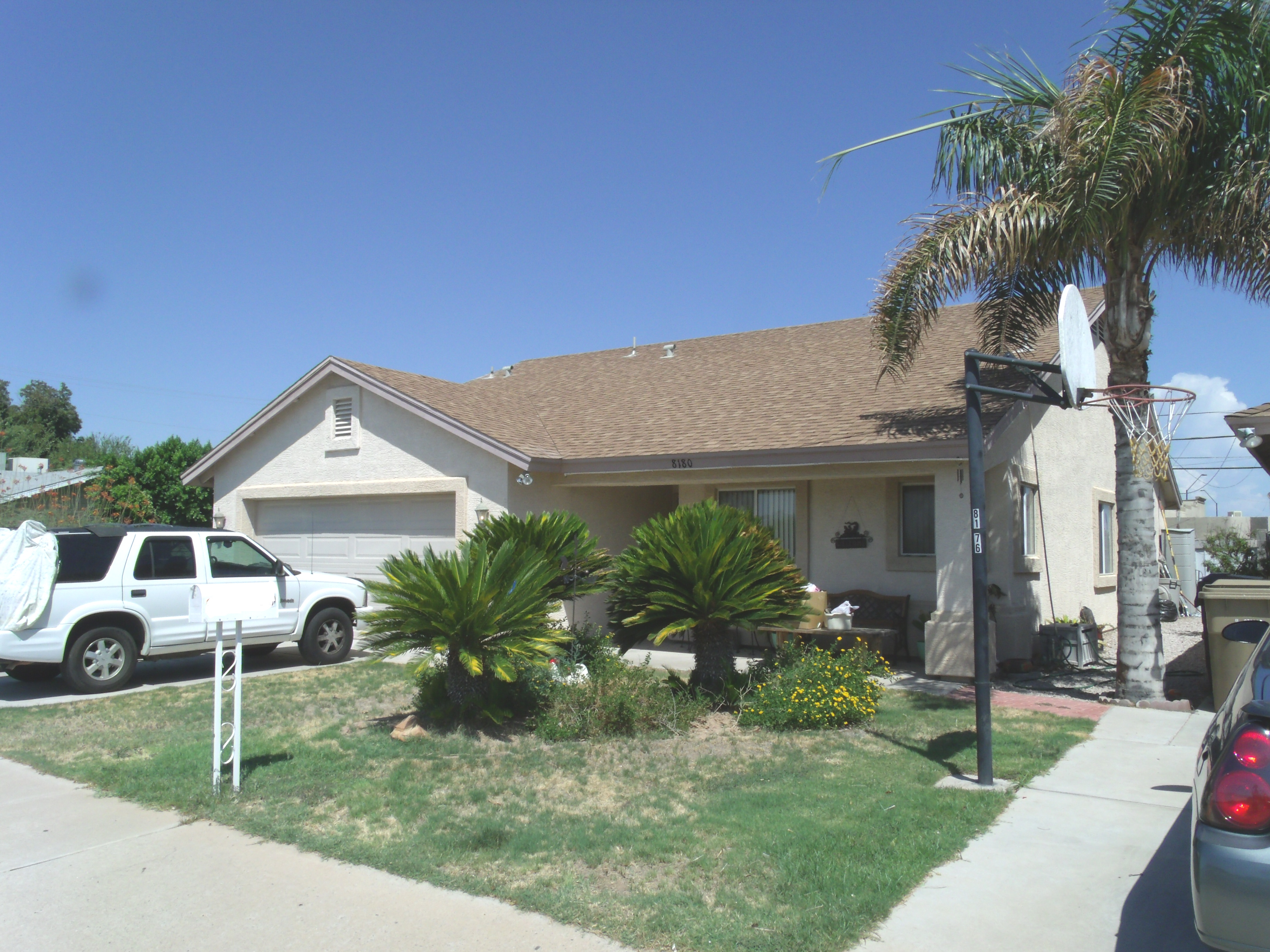
The Castillo House

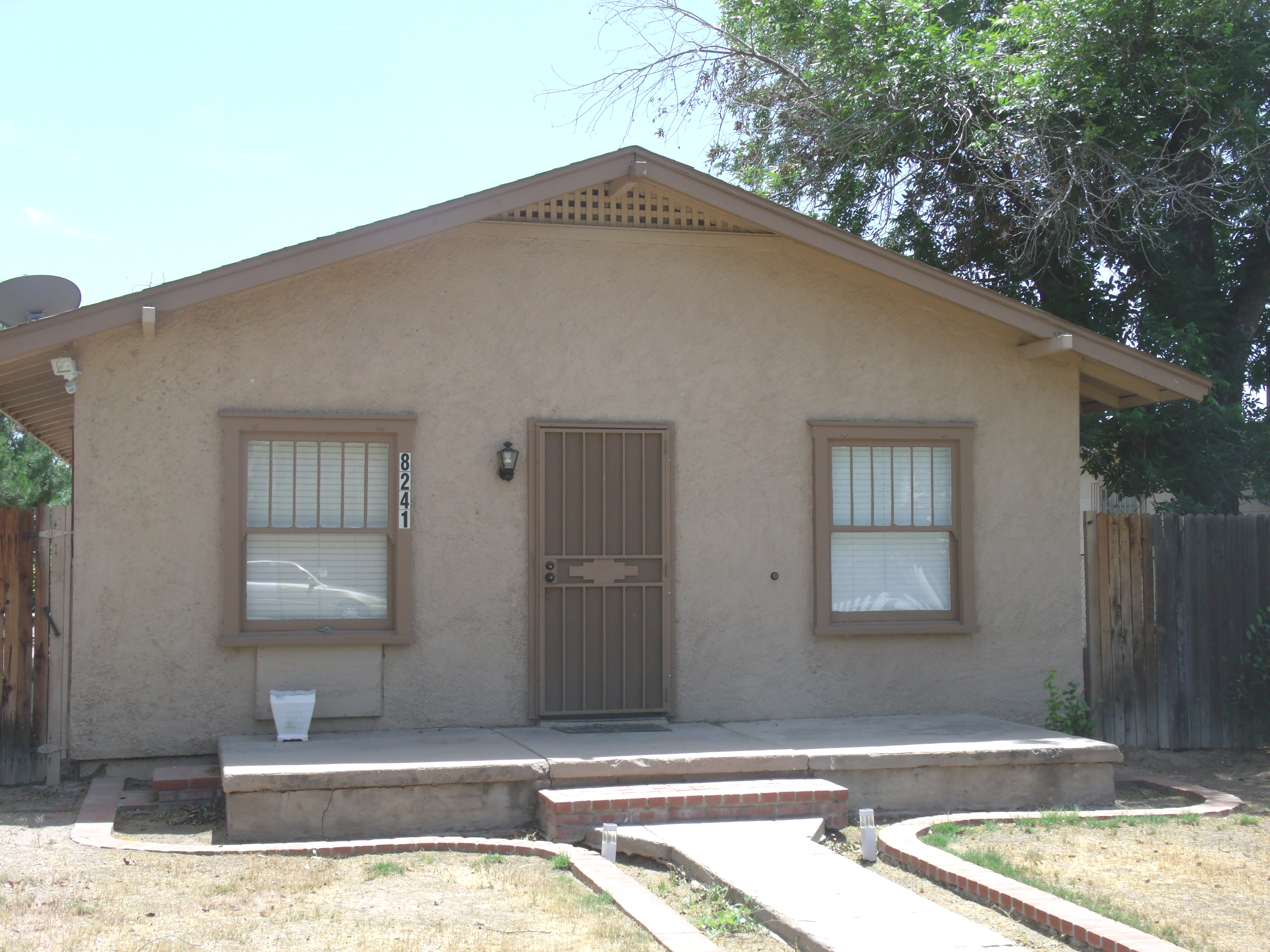
The Gillis House

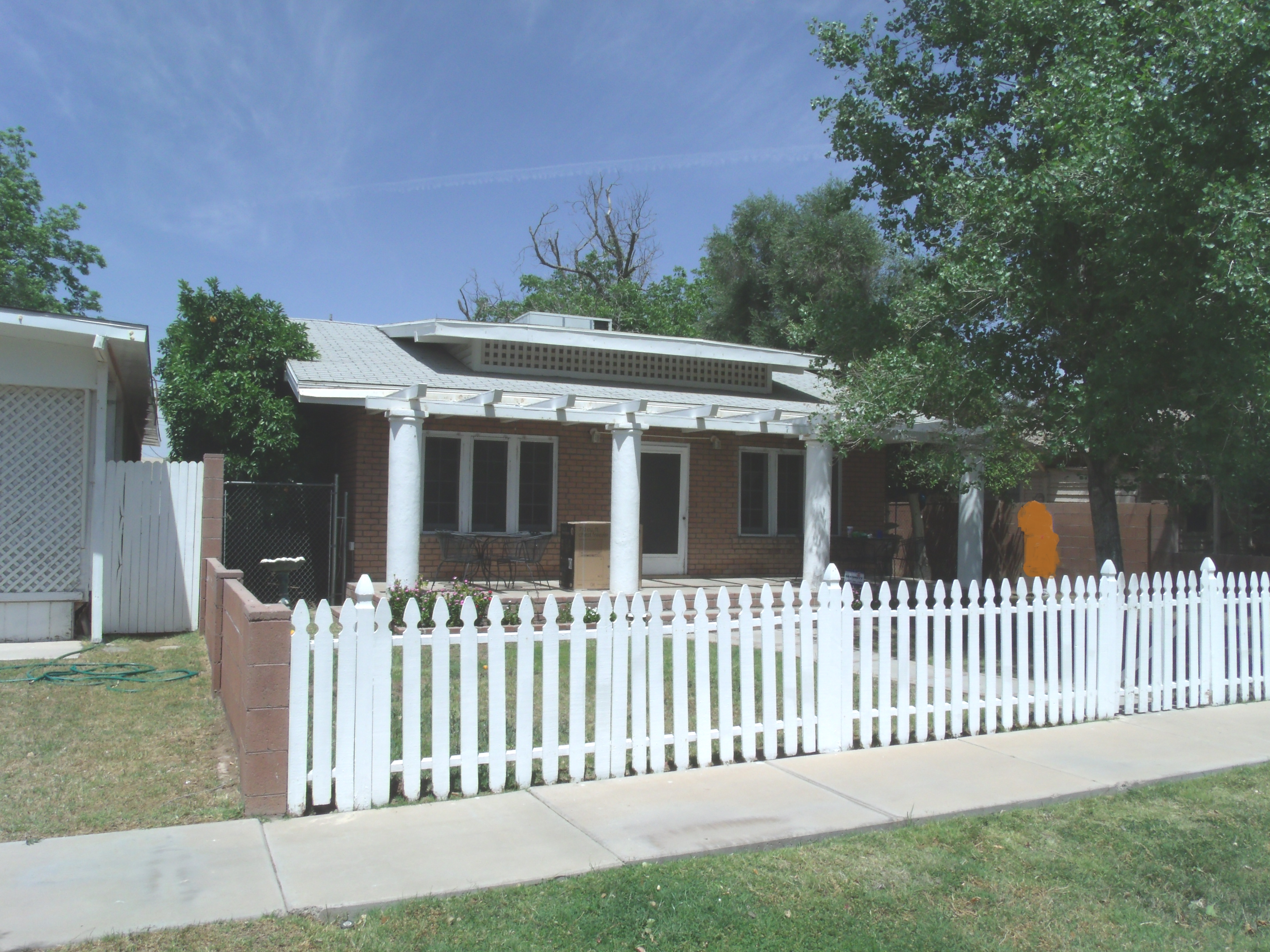
The Mason House

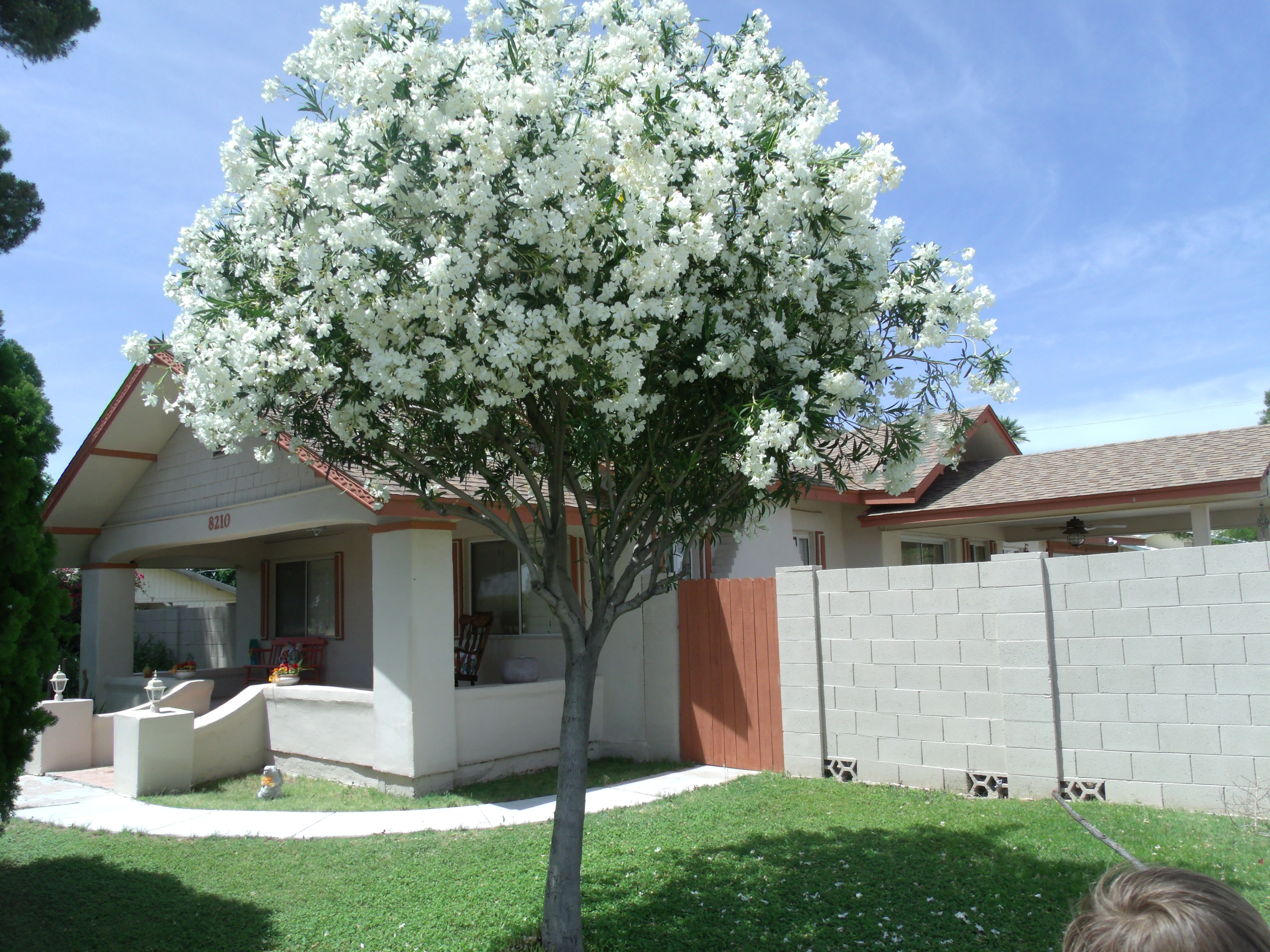
The Sosnoskie House

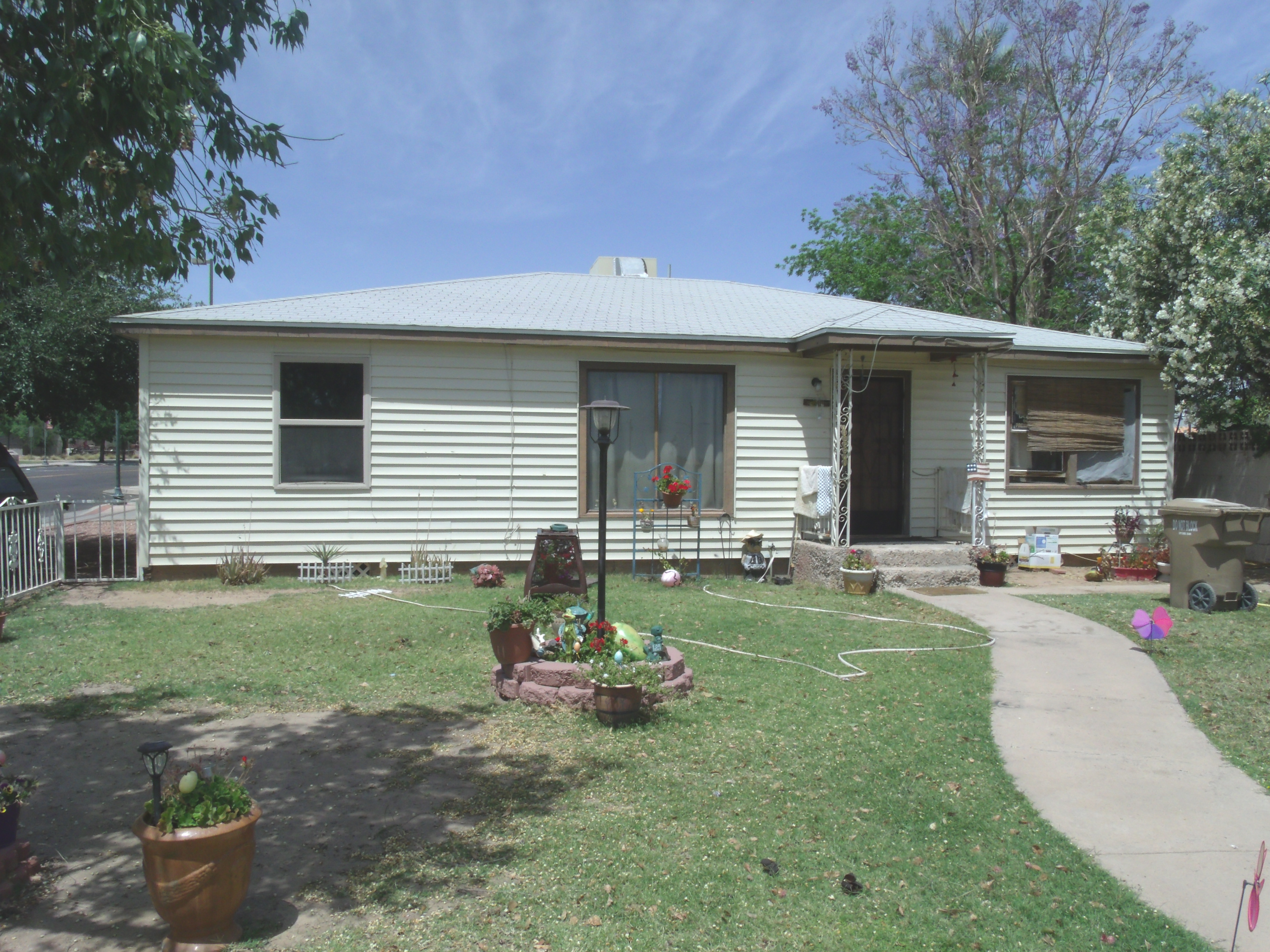
The Vickery/Belarde House

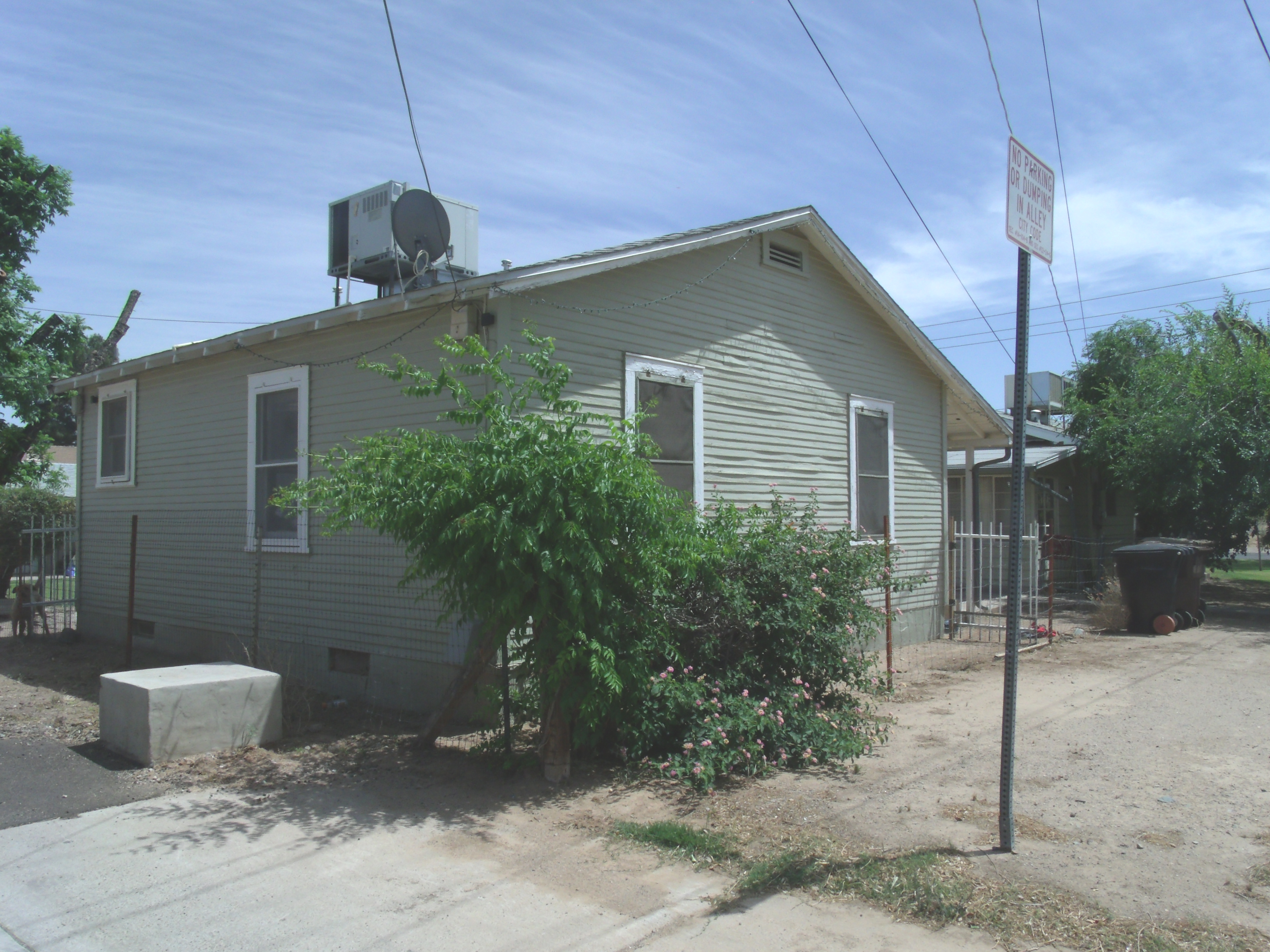
The Edmiston House

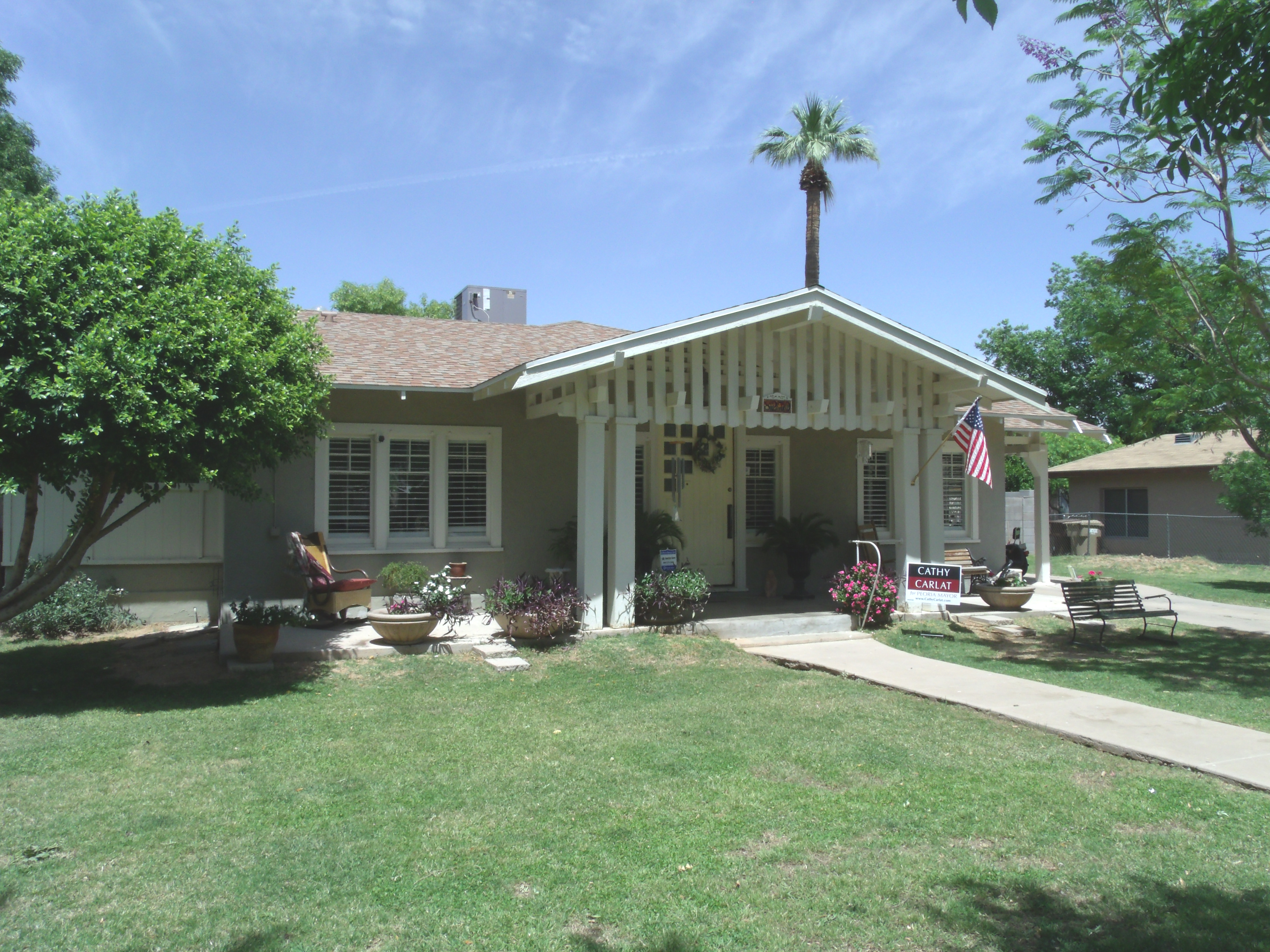
The Latham/Meeker House w

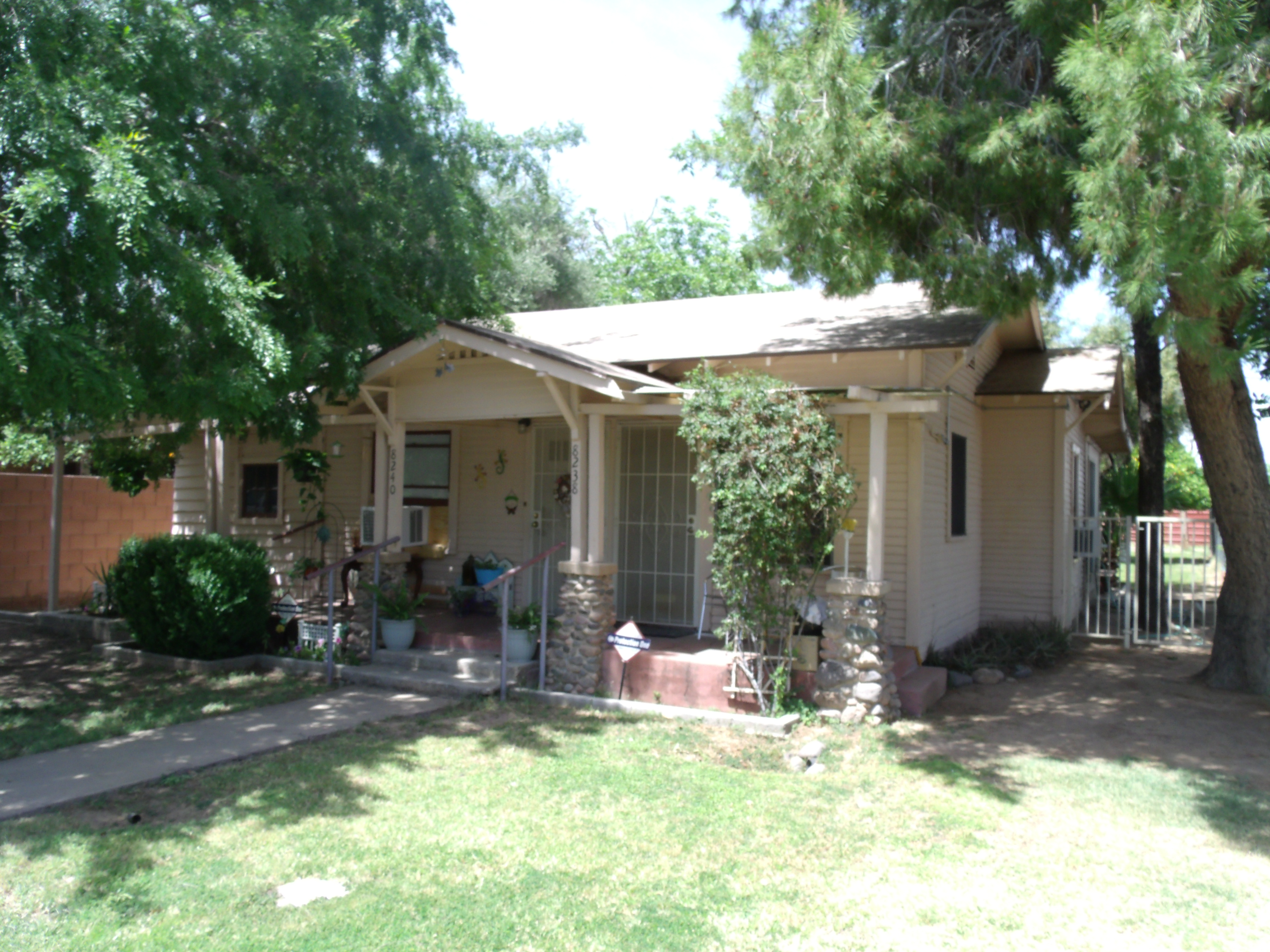
The Deatsch House

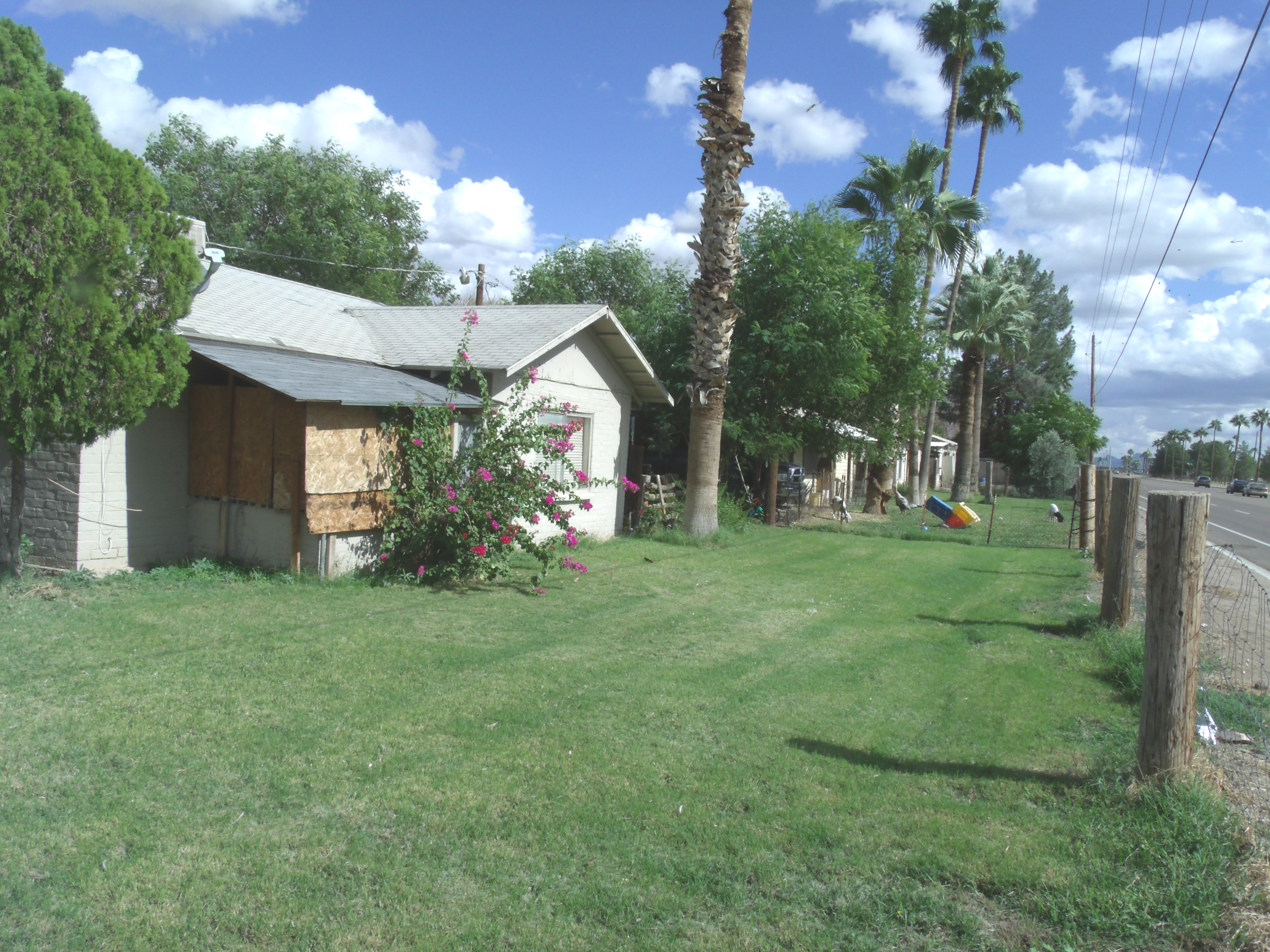
1920s Shanty Houses

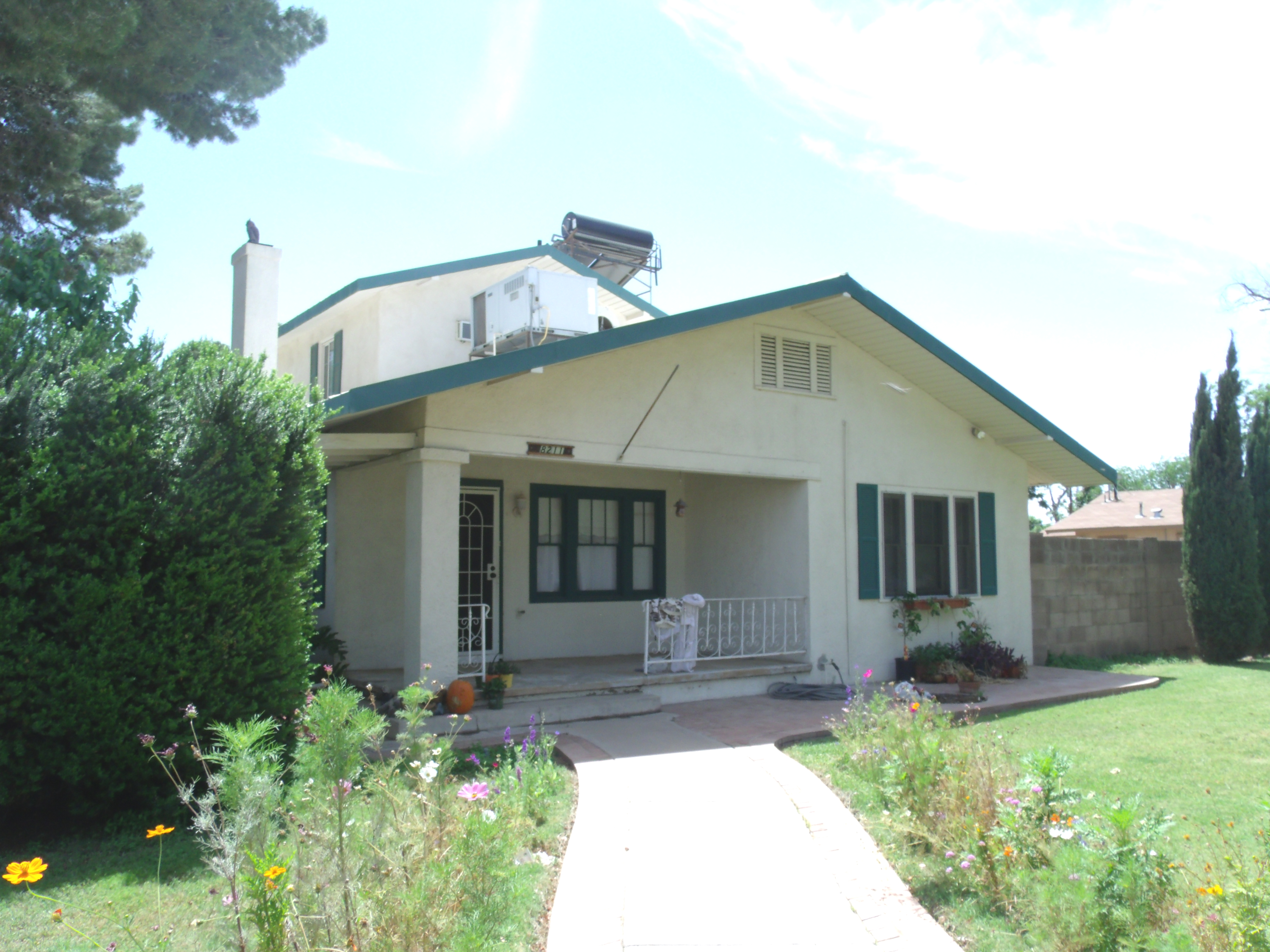
The C.A. Robinson House

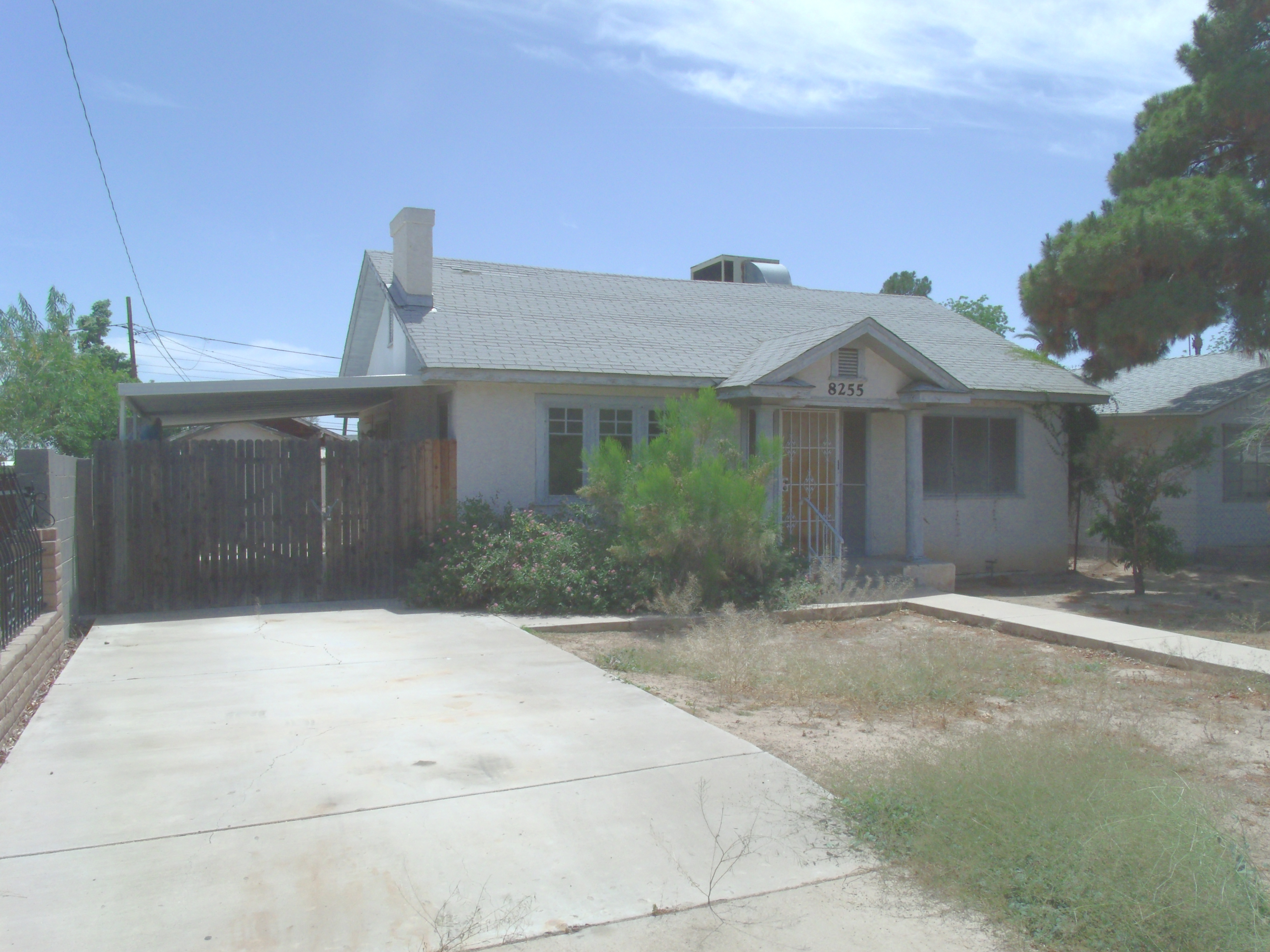
The Coor House

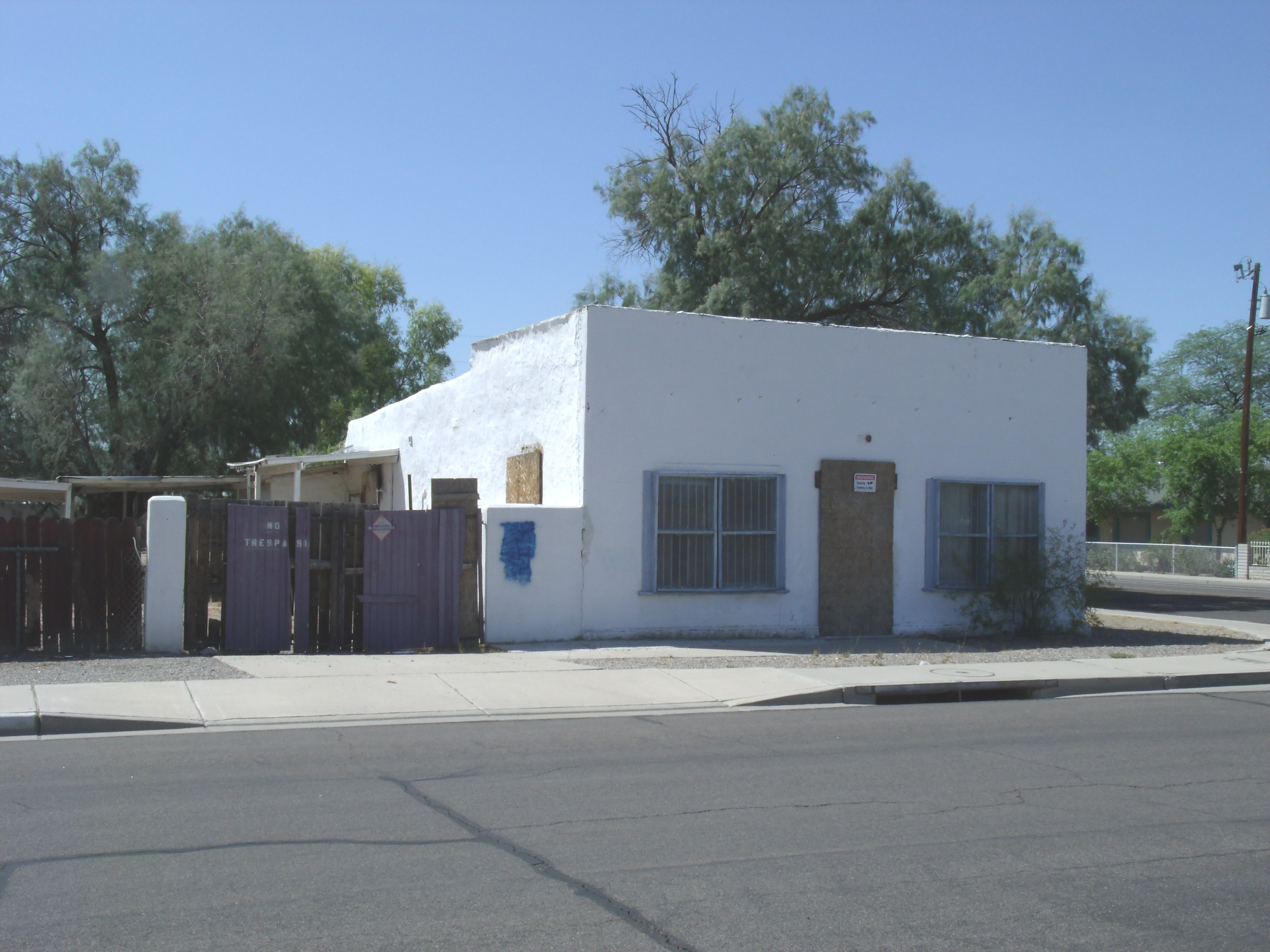
The Meyer House

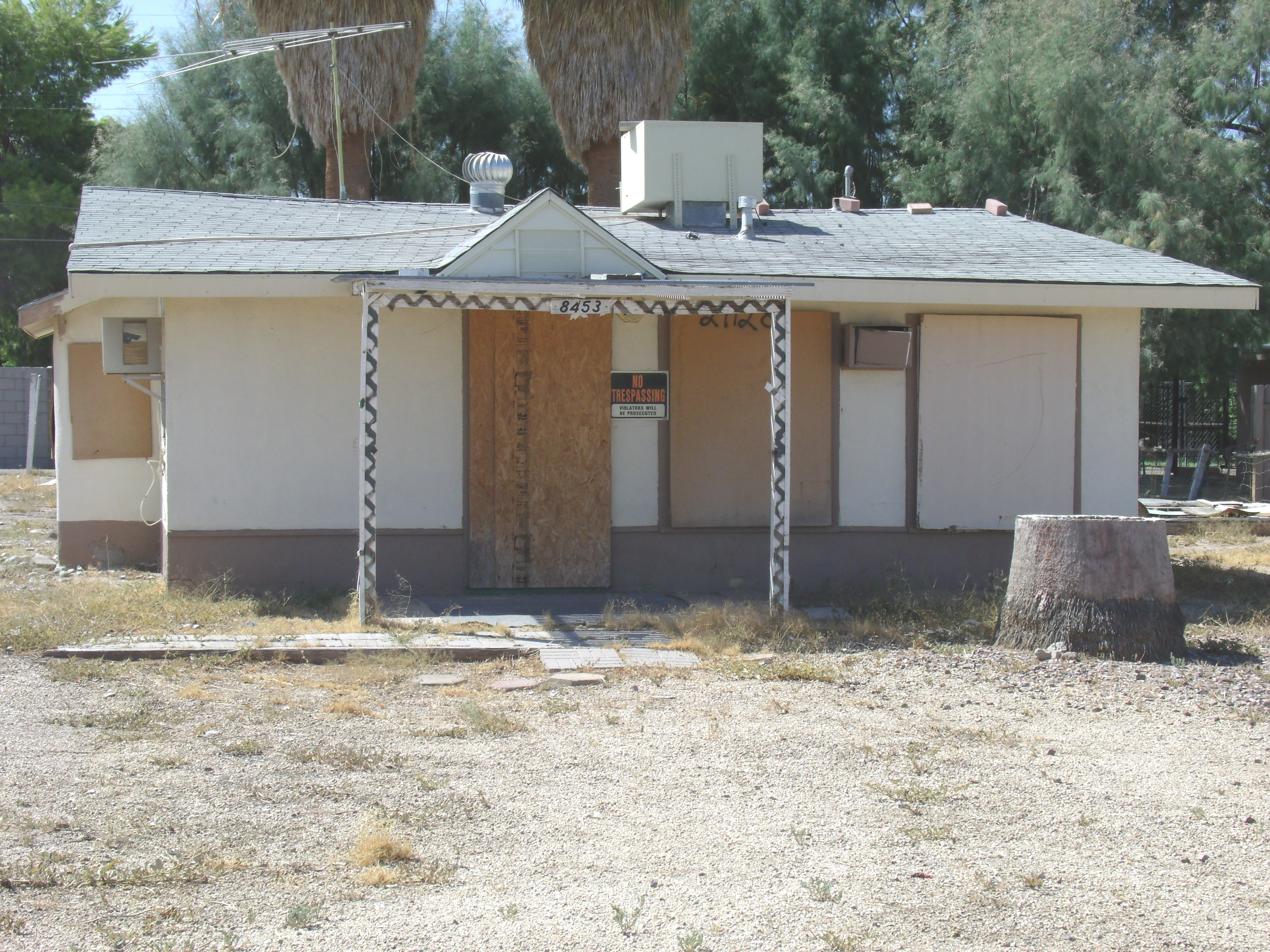
The Peddicord House

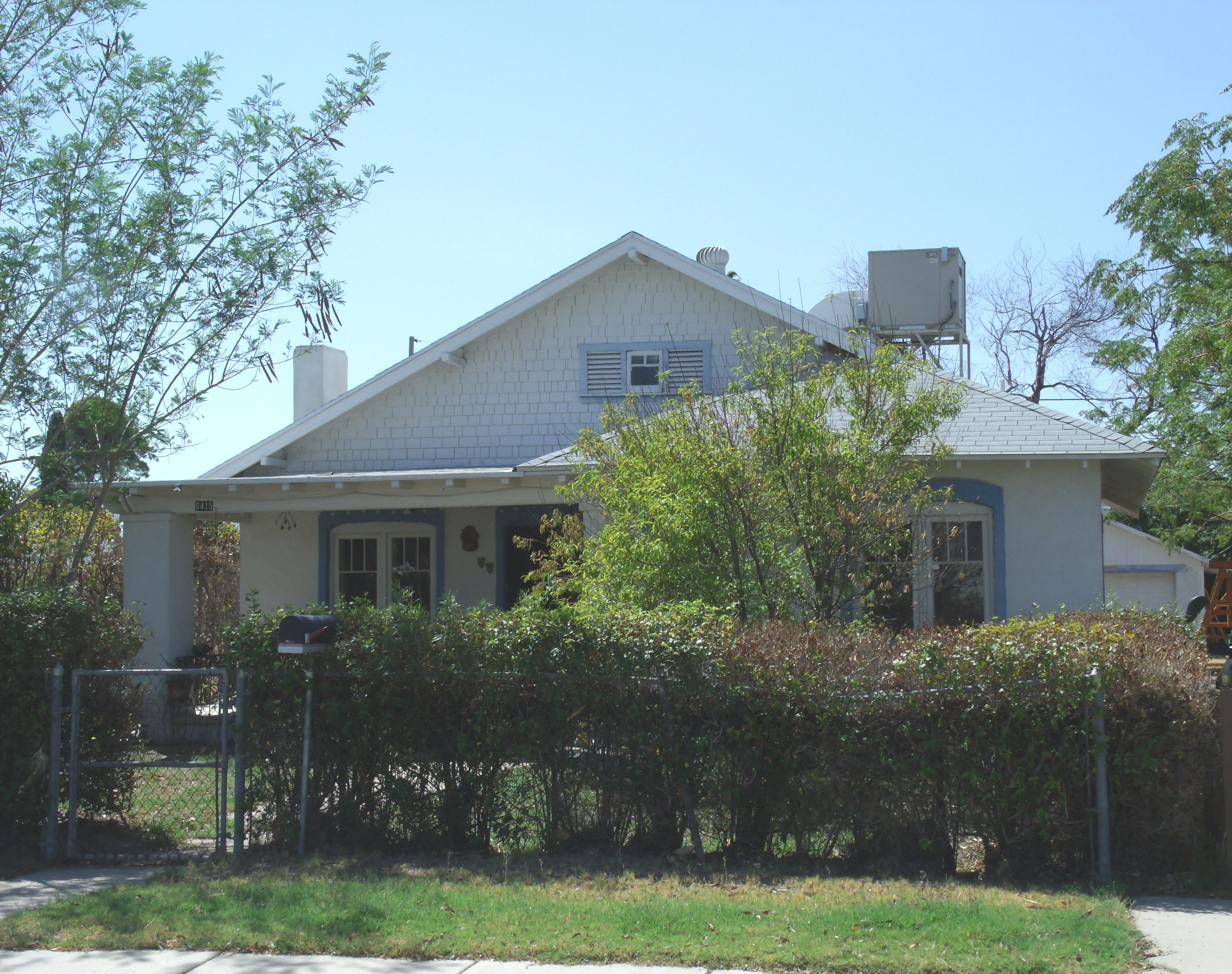
The Lebarion House

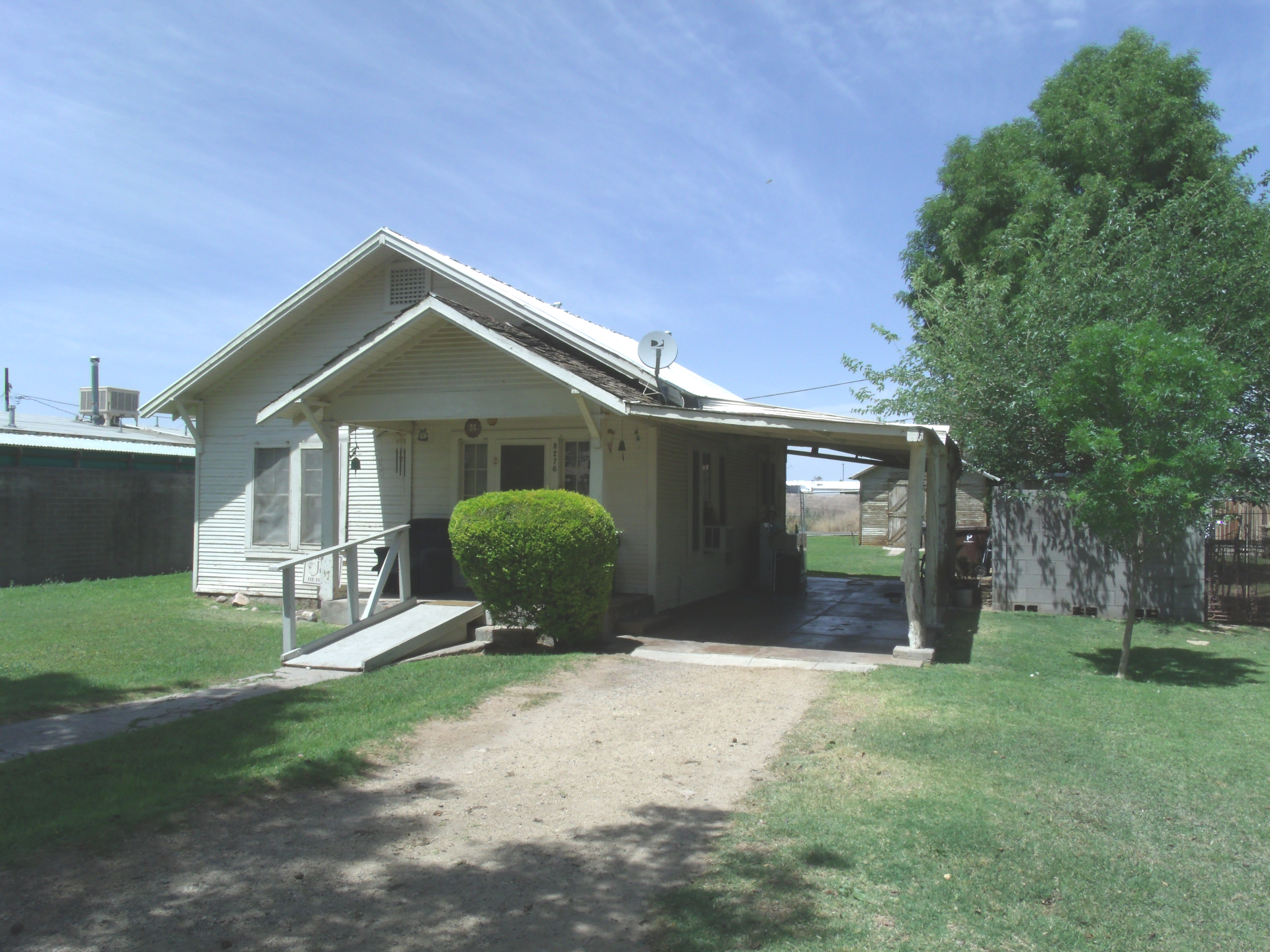
The Roach House

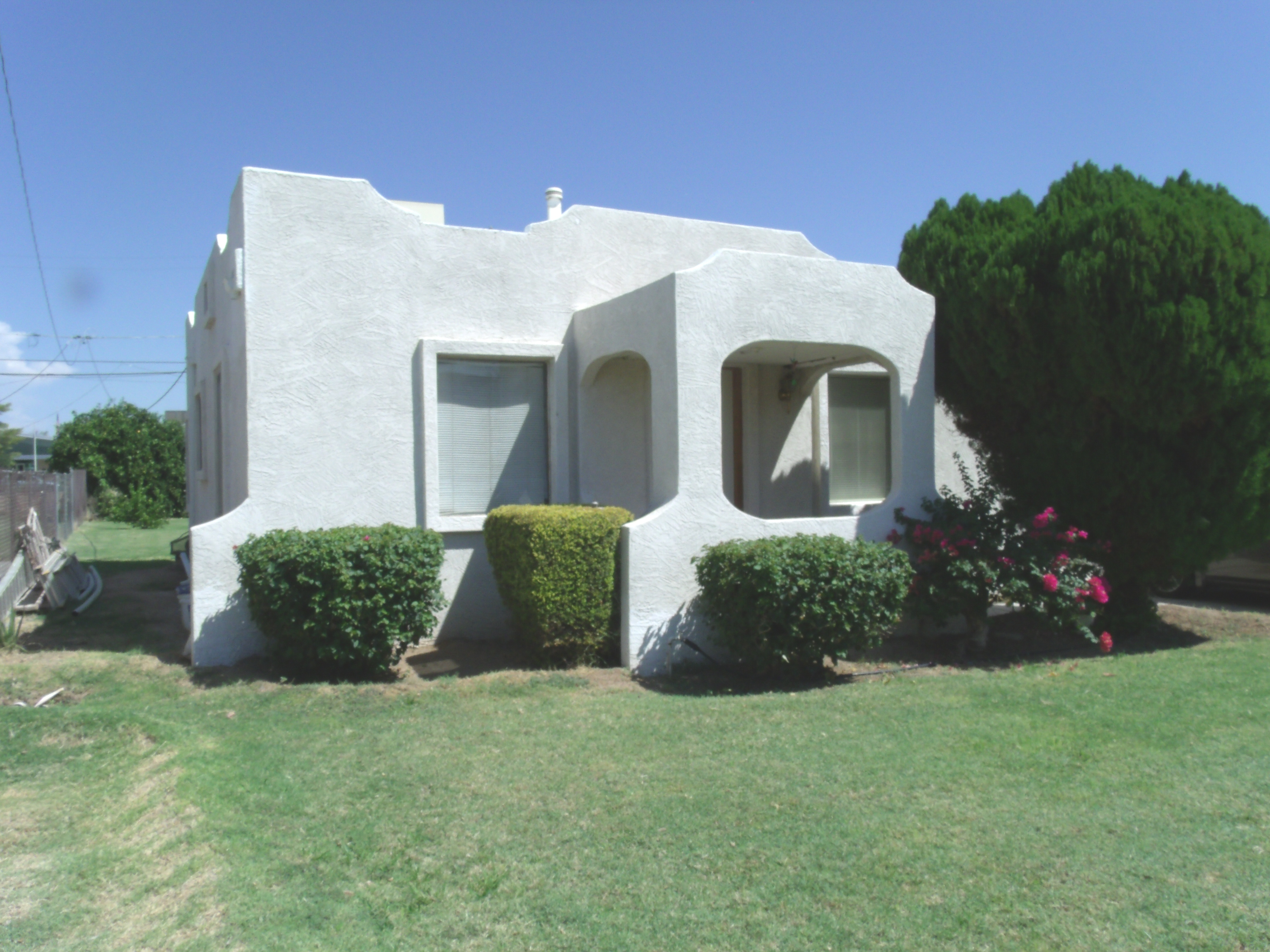
The Vazquez House

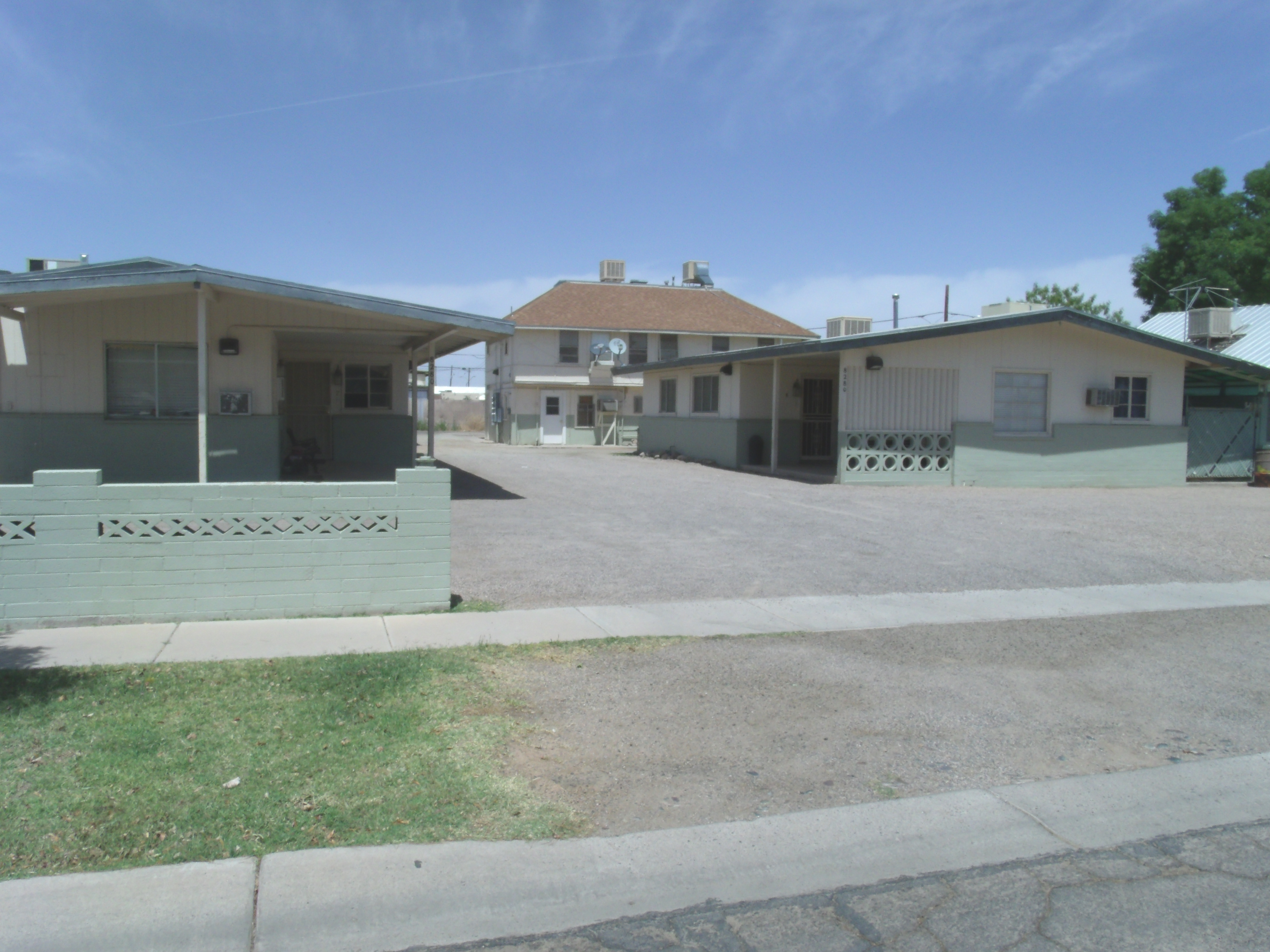
The Turner Apartments

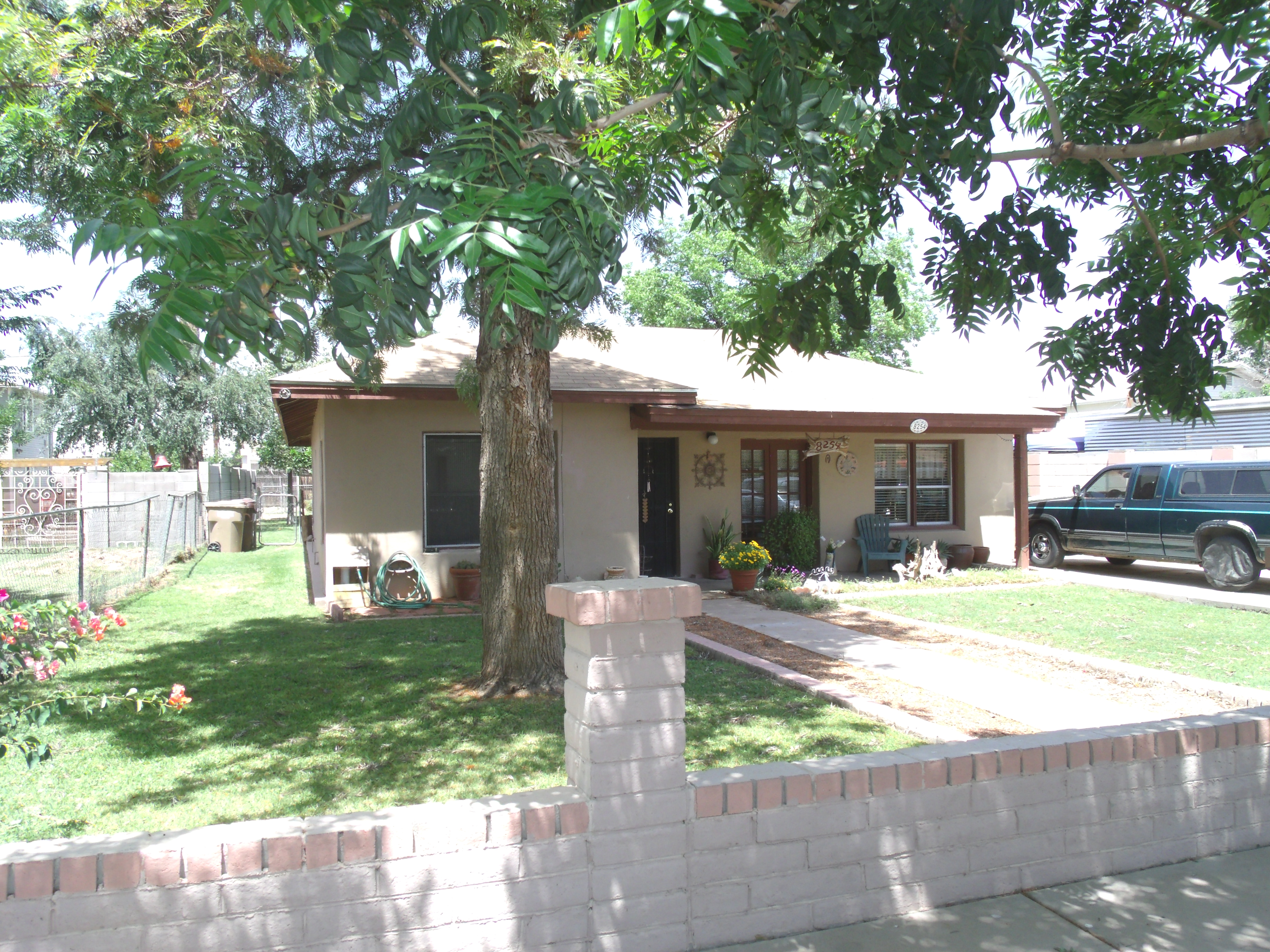
The Sullivan House

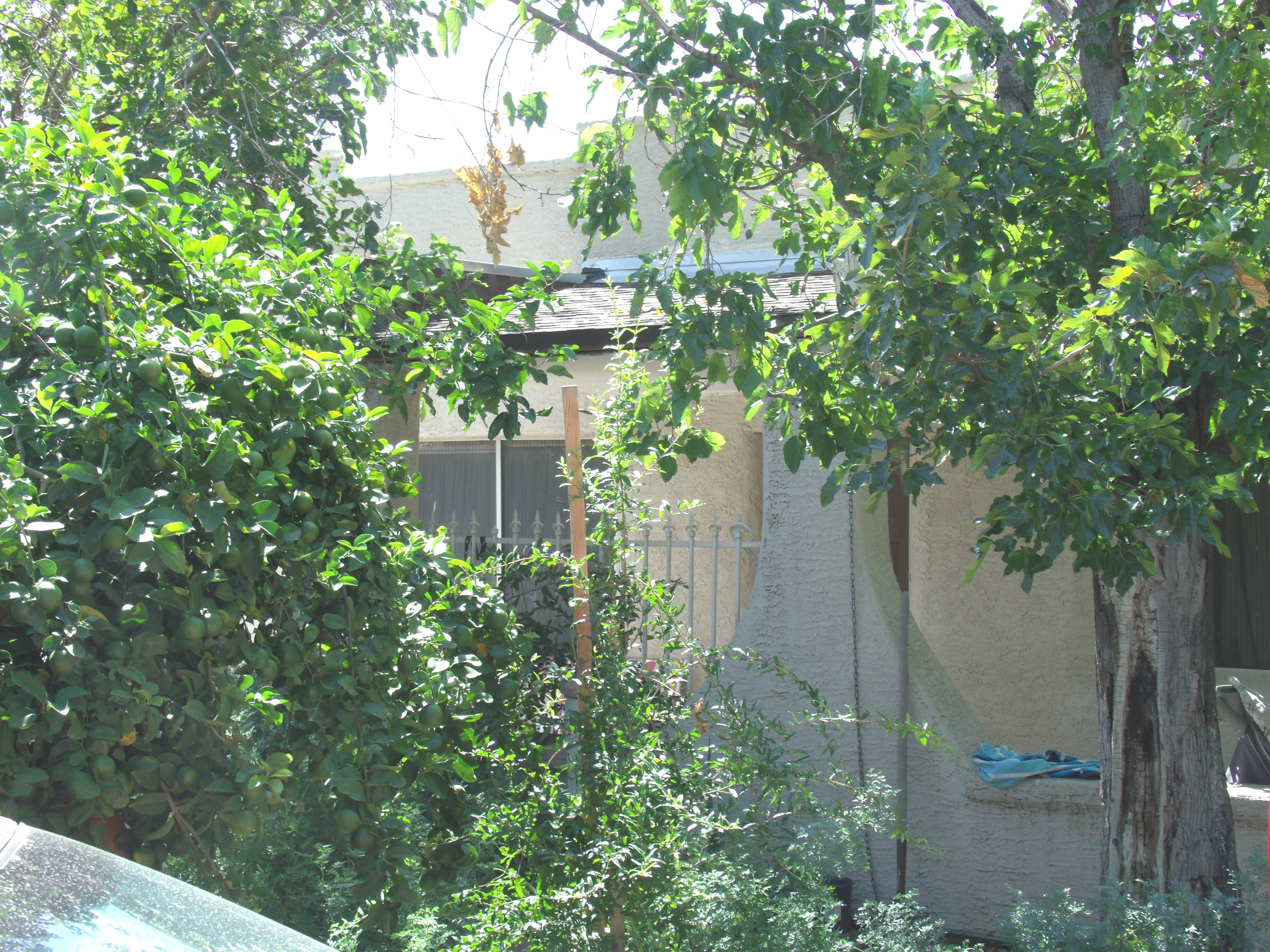
The McCoy House

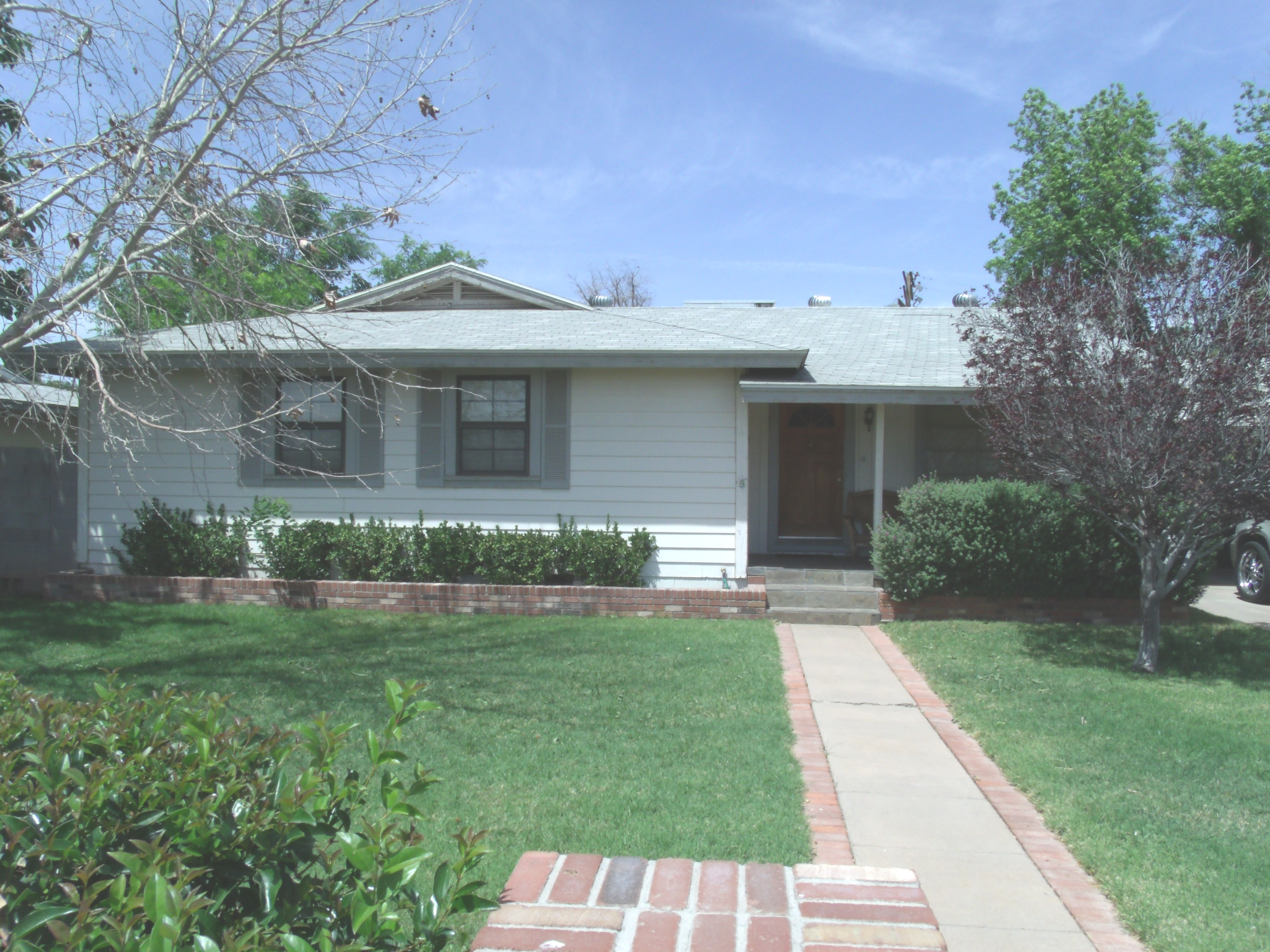
The Lopez House

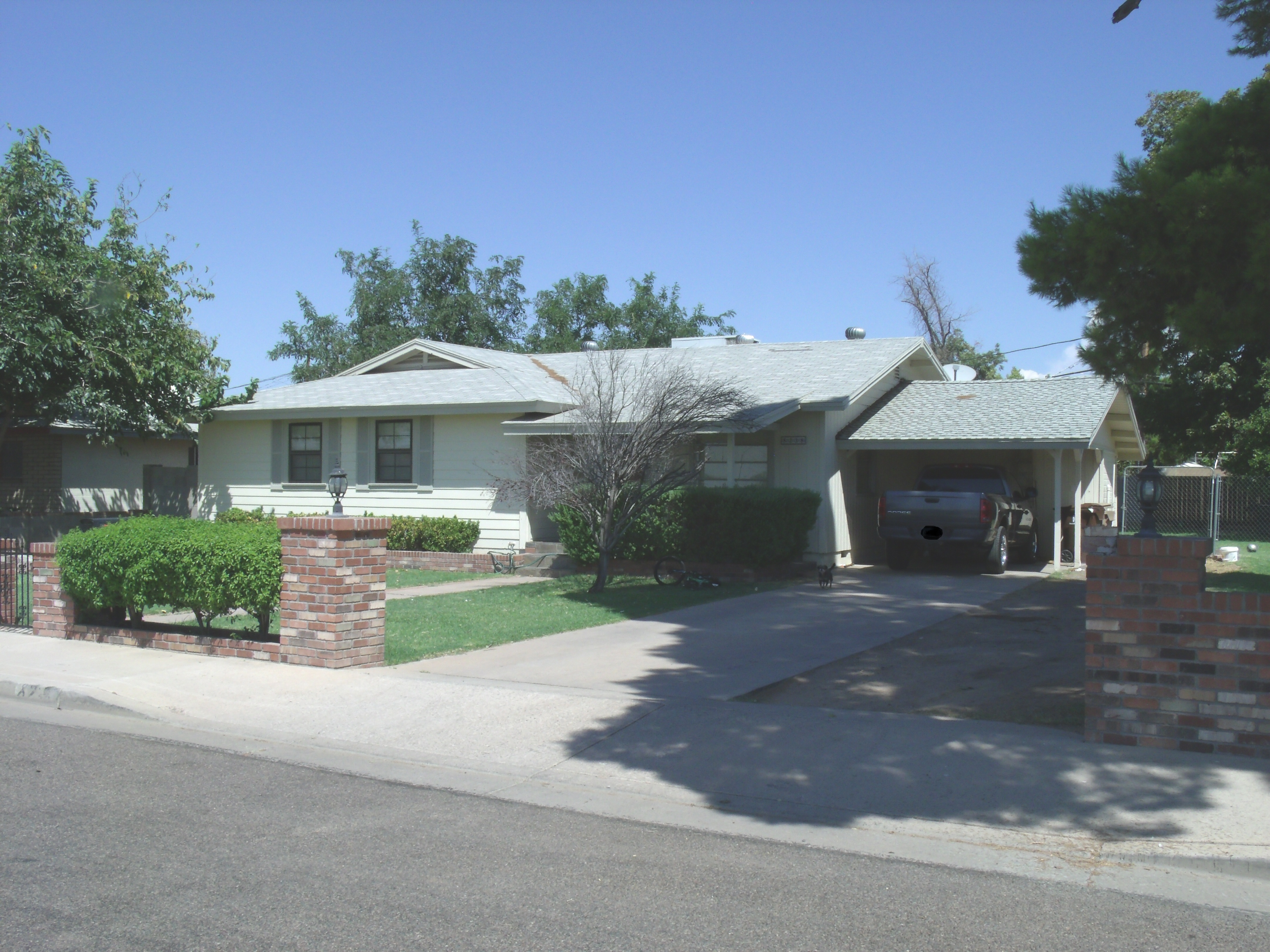
The Camacho House

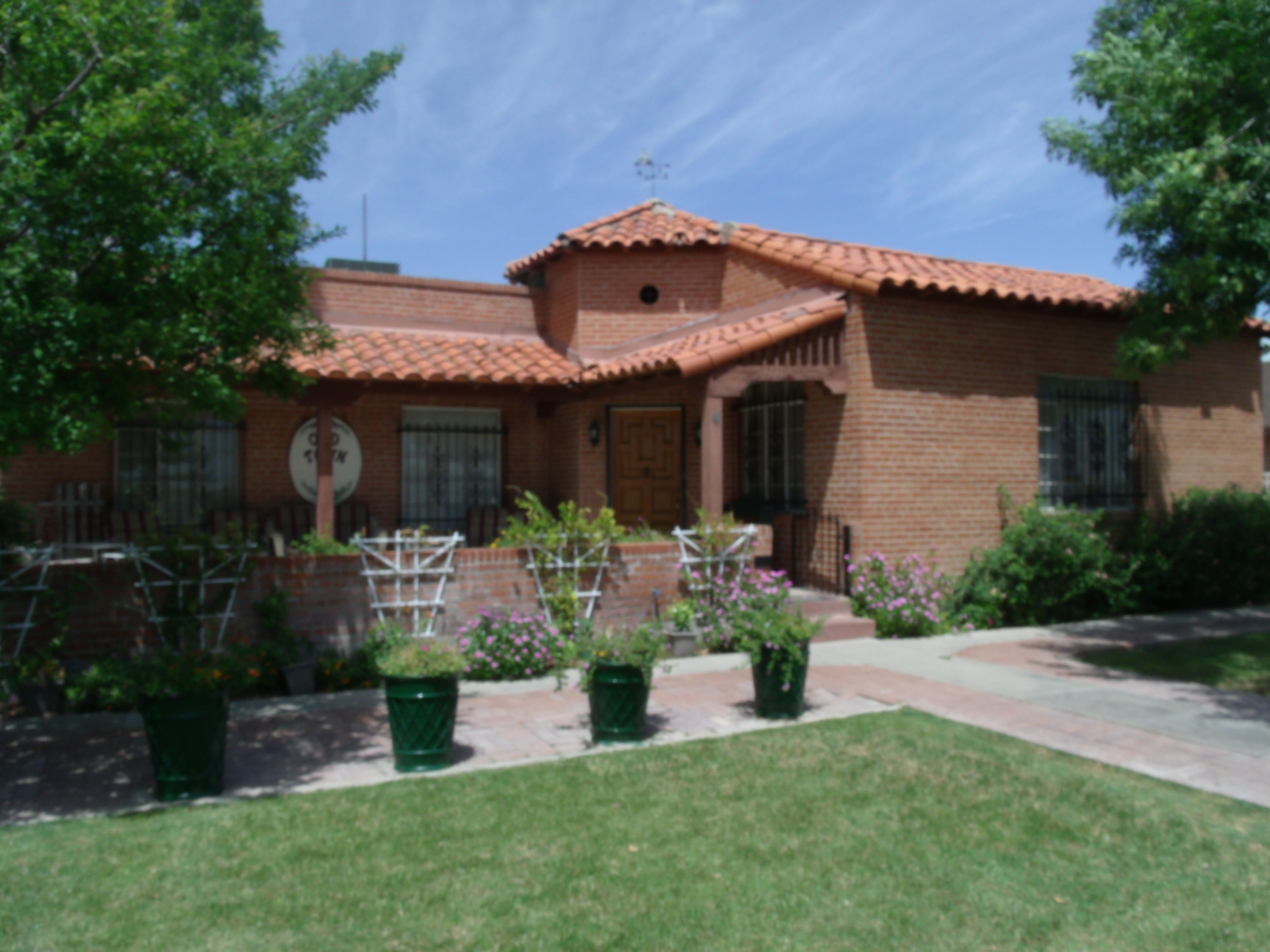
The Saliba House

== Palo Verde Ruins ==
The Palo Verde Ruin was once home to the largest Hohokam settlement along the New River. It is the second Peoria landmark to be listed on the National Register of Historic Places.

Palo Verde Ruin.
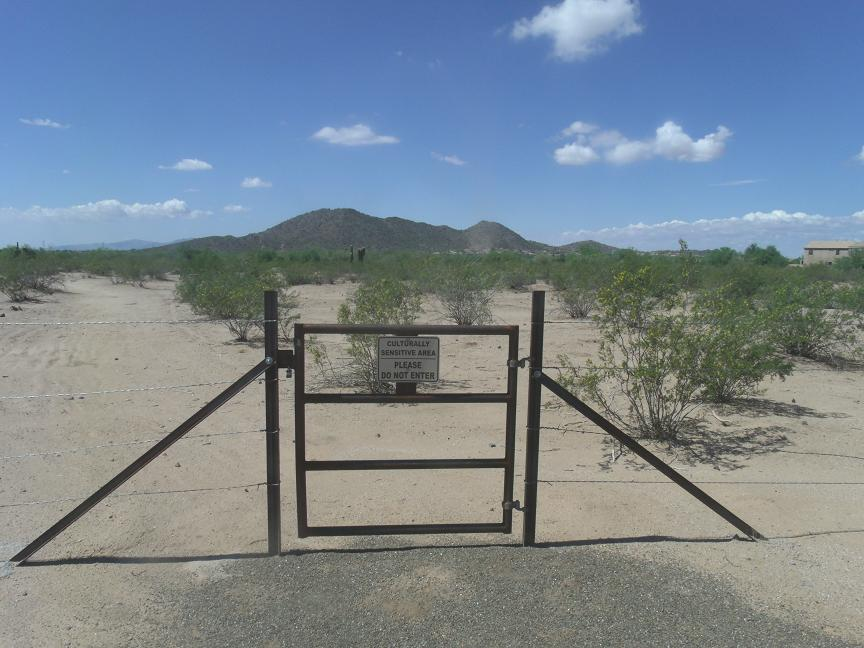
Entrance to Palo Verde Ruin (NRHP), a 20-acre, city-owned portion of what once was home to the largest Hohokam settlement along the New River (NRHP).

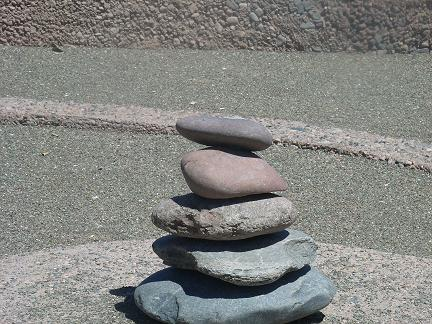
This rock formation is found in the Palo Verde Park section of the Palo Verde Ruin (NRHP).

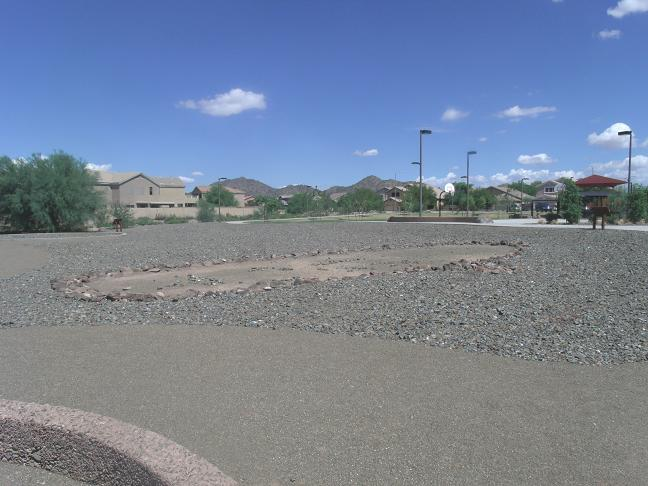
Area in the Palo Verde Park section of the Palo Verde Ruin (NRHP).

== Indian Mesa and the Hohokam village ==
Indian Mesa is located in the Lake Pleasant Regional Park. On top of the mesa there are ruins of a prehistoric Hohokam village which is monitored by the Arizona Site Stewards and considered an important archaeological site by the U.S. Bureau of Land Management. It is estimated that in the years AD 1000 to AD 1200, people associated with the Hohokam cultural tradition, built a community which housed anywhere from 100 to 200 people on top of the mesa.

The ruins of a Hohokam village on top of Indian Mesa
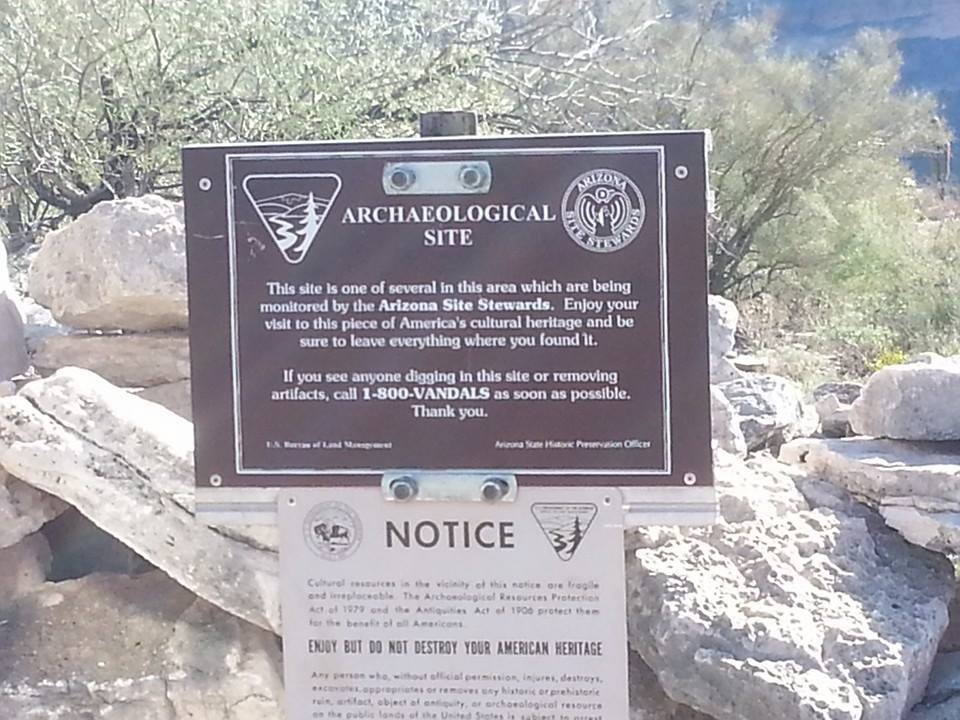
U.S. Bureau of Land Management Marker on Indian Mesa. The marker warns that removal of artifacts is strictly forbidden by Federal Law.

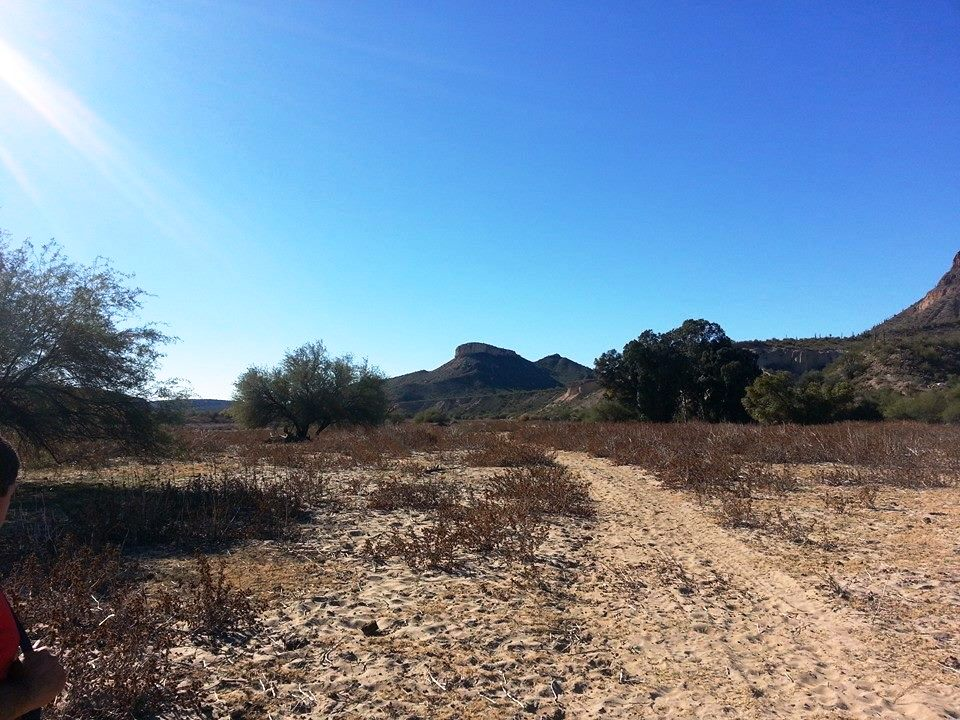
Hiking trail leading to the Indian Mesa (in the background). The hiking trail is located on a portion of a canal which the Hohokam built in 700 AD. The canal is now filled with soil.

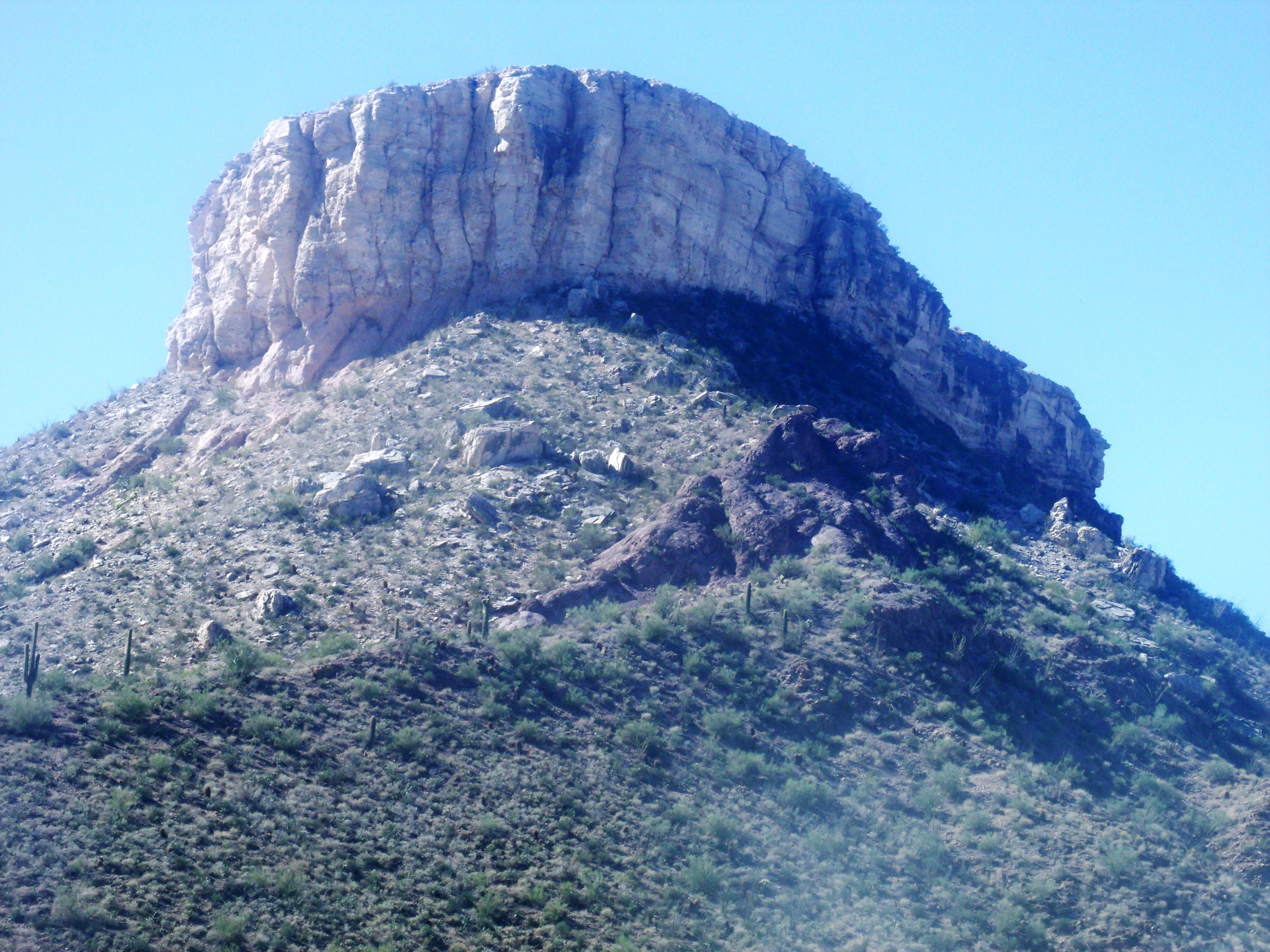
Indian Mesa at Lake Pleasant Regional Park. On top of the Mesa are the ruins of a village built by the Hohokam about 1000 years ago.

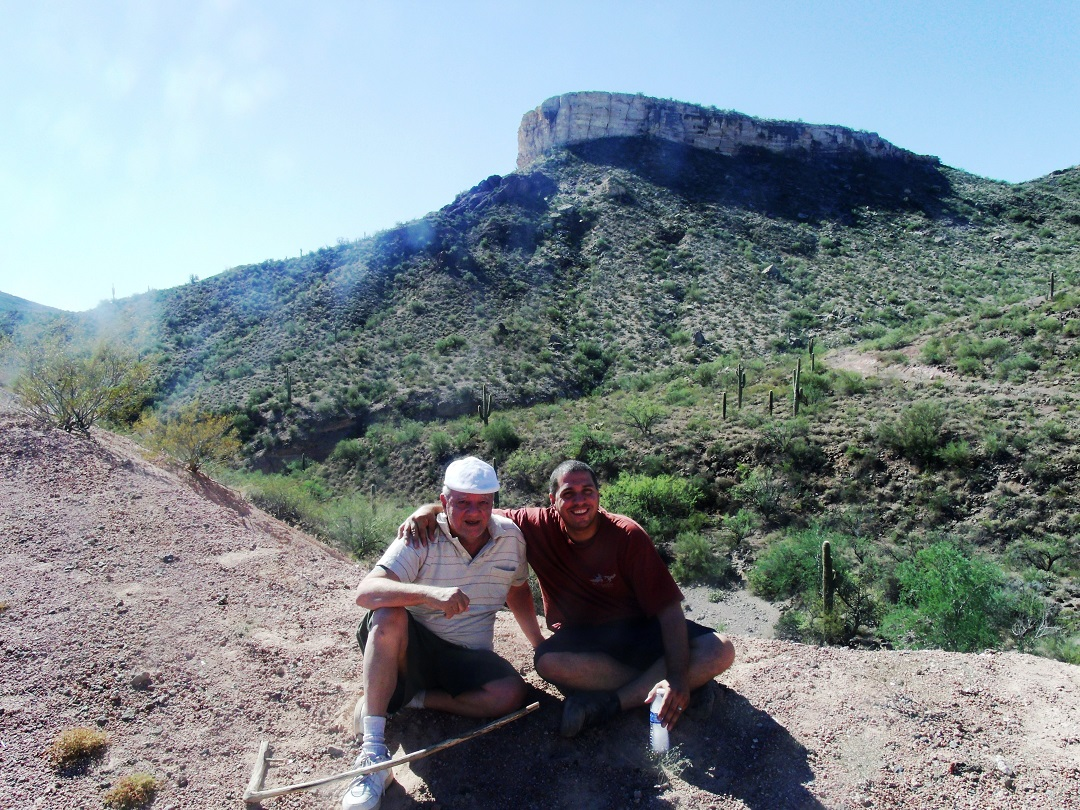
Hikers pose with Indian Mesa in the background.

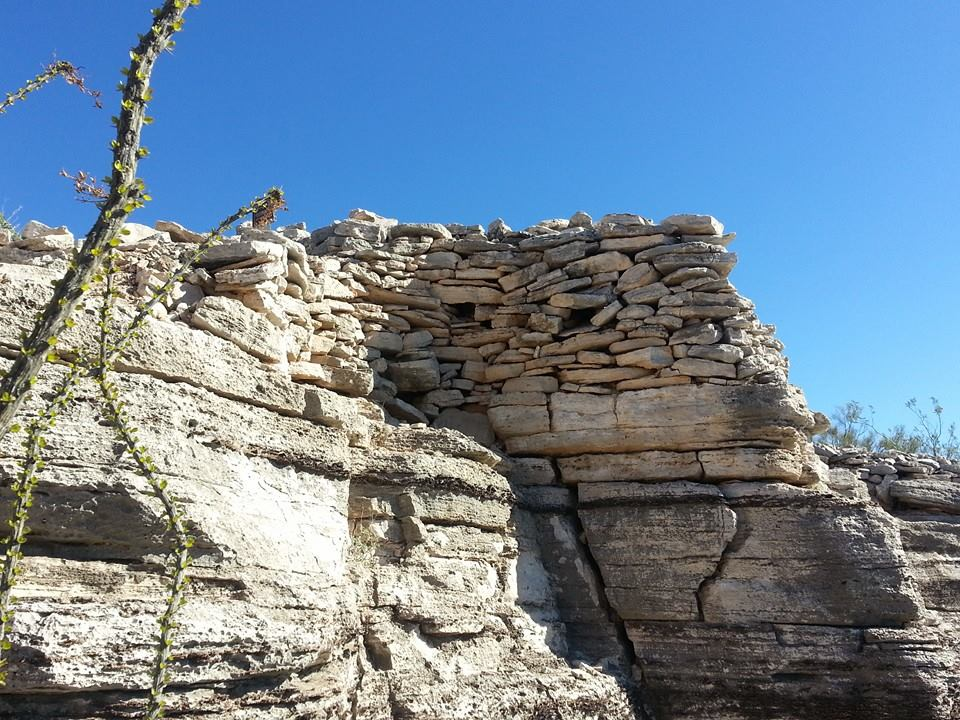
Different views of the ruins of a village built by the Hohokam about 1000 years ago on top of Indian Mesa located at Lake Pleasant. This is part of the wall of the fort that surrounded the village. The holes in the wall are viewing holes so the defenders can view the only path to the top. There are several branches of an "Ocotillo" shrub in the foreground.

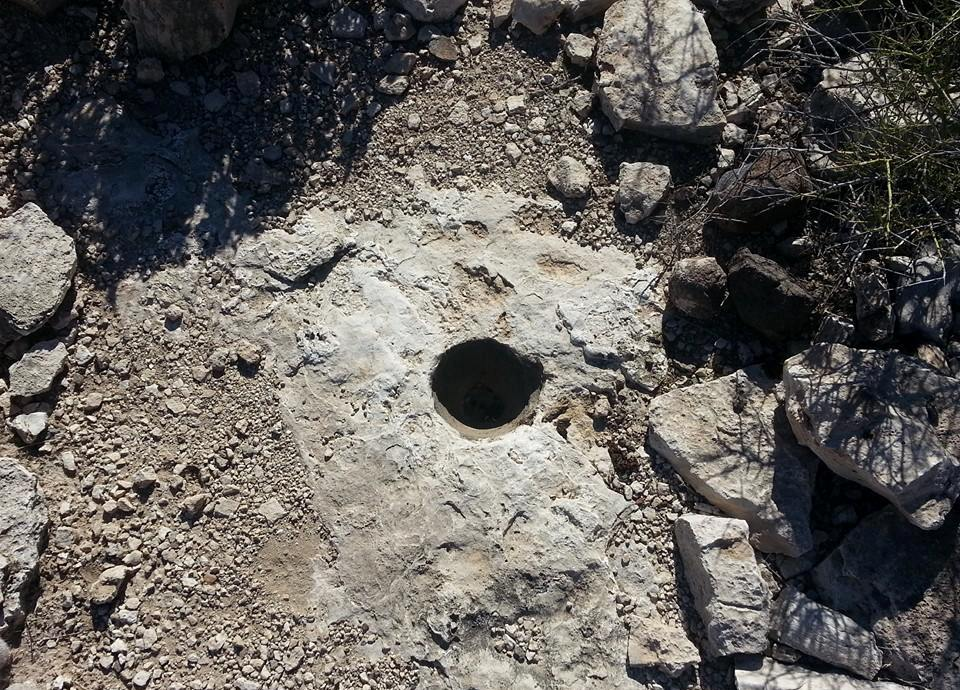
A posthole dug by the Hohokam inside their house. The Hohokam placed heavy mesquite or pine posts on them to support a roof.

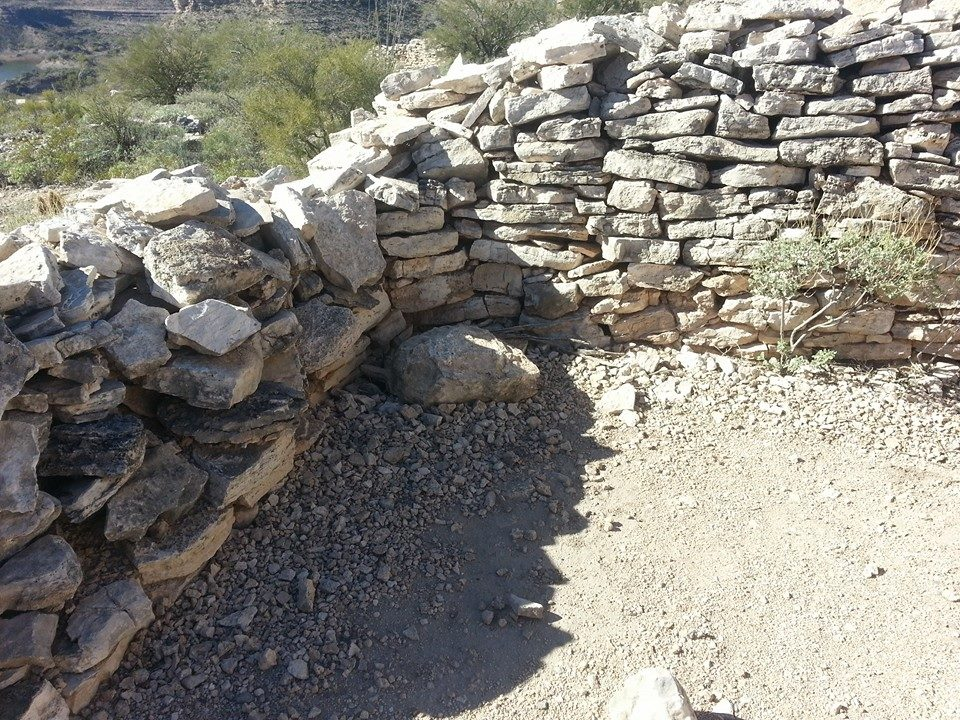
Different view of the ruins of a Hohokam house.

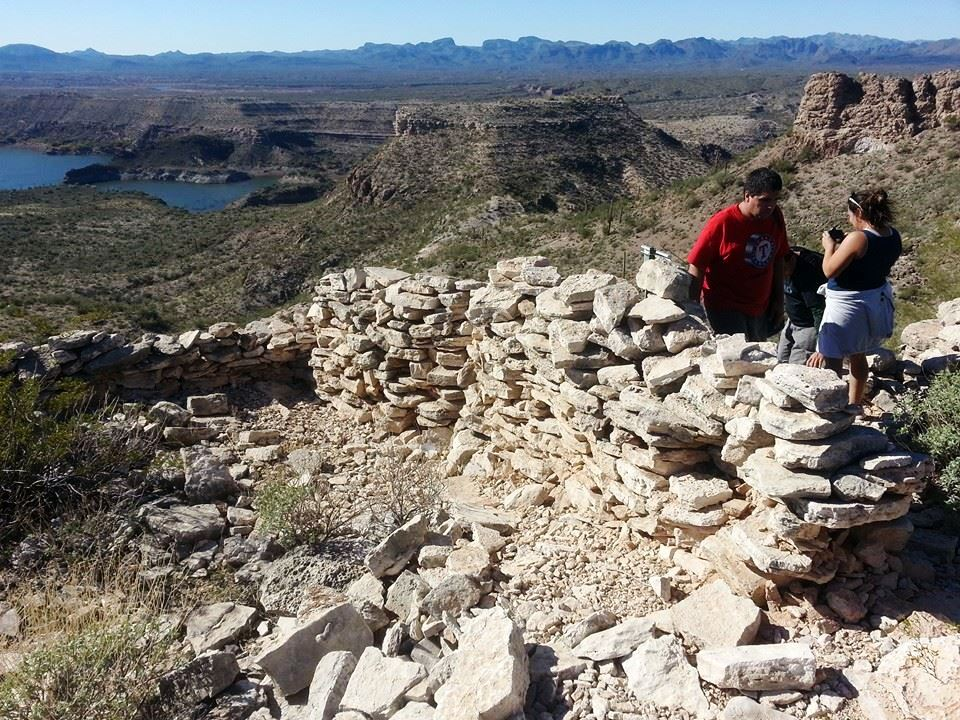
Hikers inspecting ruins.

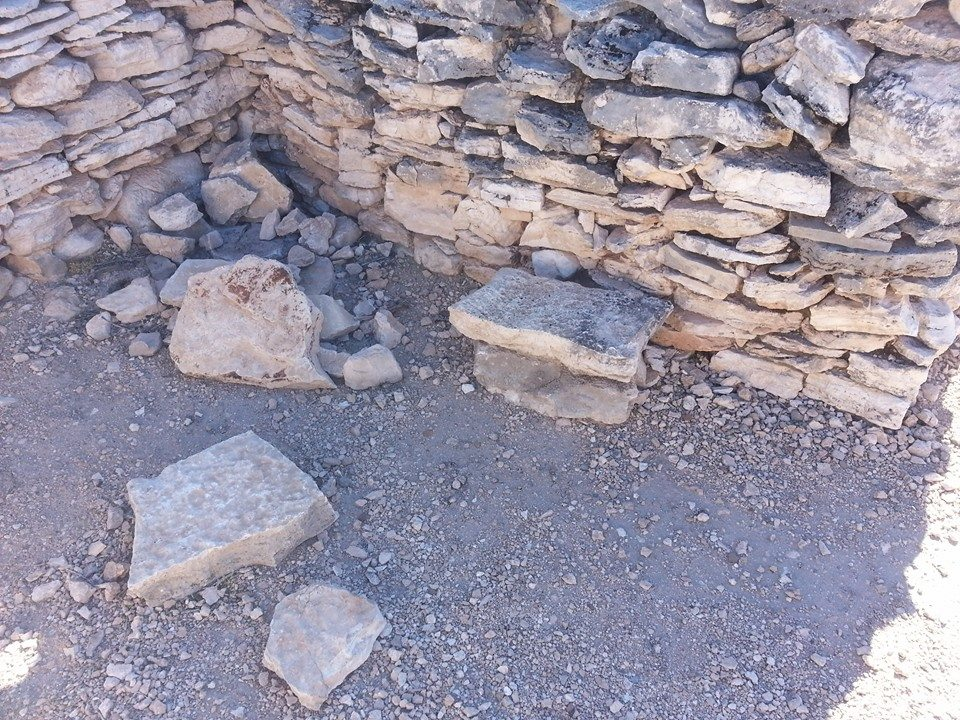
Another view of the ruins of a Hohokam house.

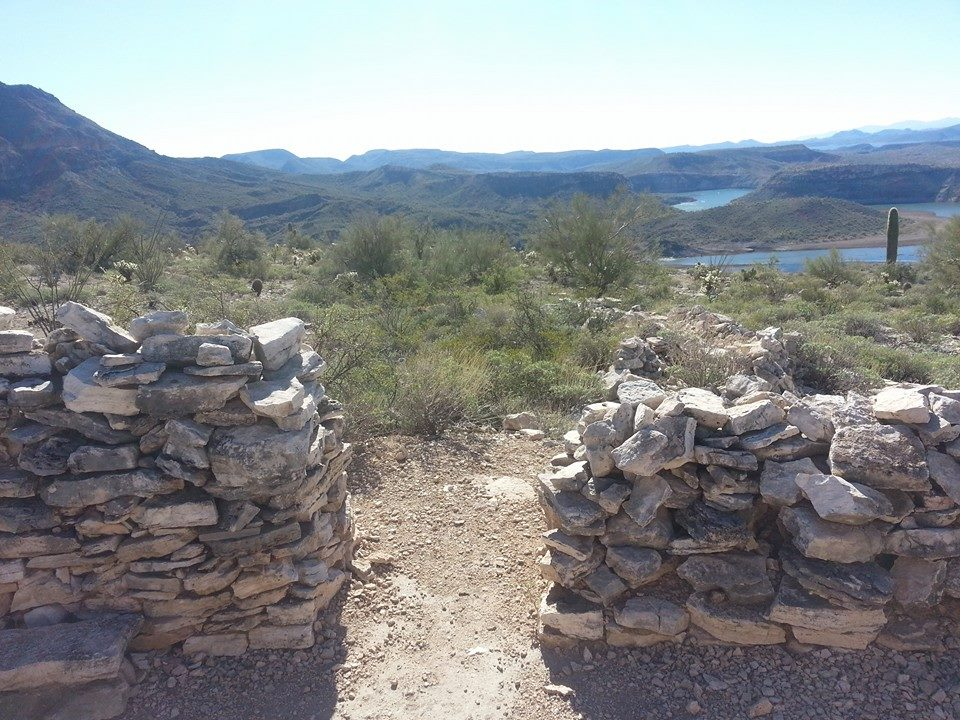
Entrance of a Hohokam home. Lake Pleasant is in the background.

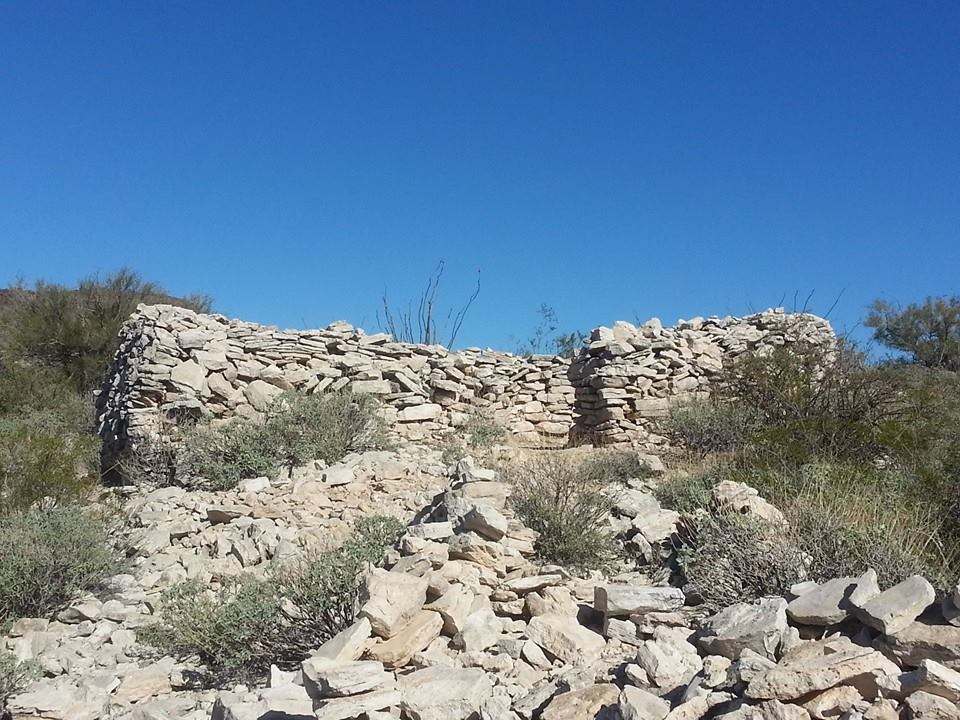
Rocky trail leading to the entrance a Hohokam house.

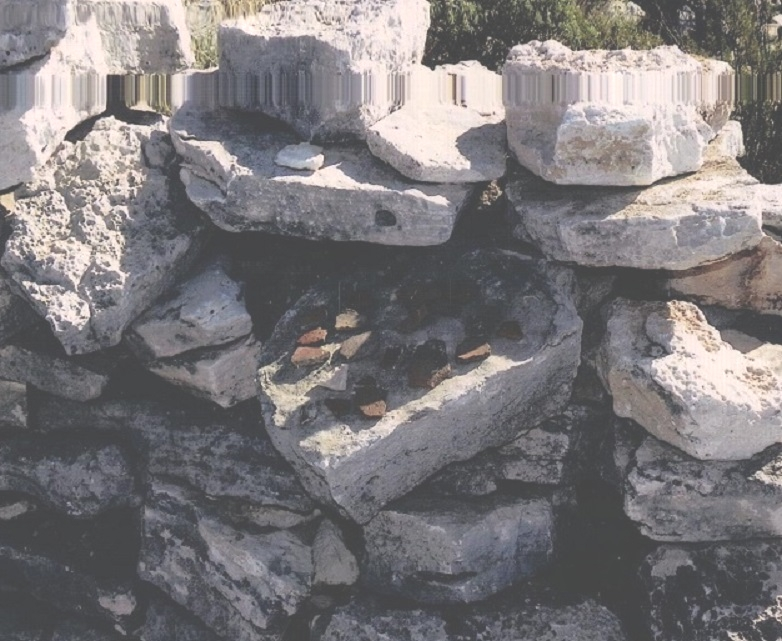
Ancient Hohokam pottery pieces (small brown ones) found at Indian Mesa.

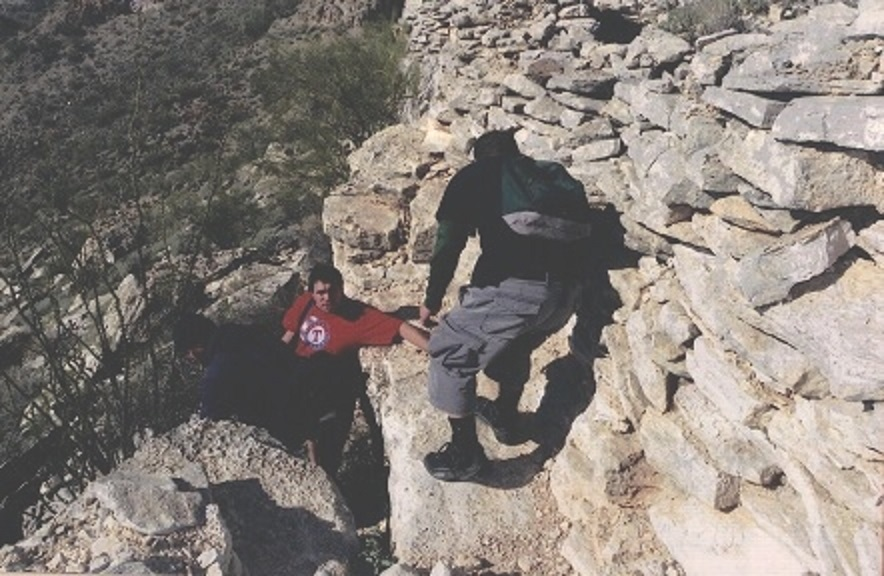
Hikers on the steep one hundred foot drop trail in Indian Mesa.

== Weedville (Peoria) ==
Weedville, Arizona was a small community founded in 1911, by Reverend Ora Rush Weed, a Methodist minister from Kansas. Weedville was founded in an area which at the time was outside the city limits of Peoria. The area is located within the pockets of an unincorporated land under the jurisdiction of Maricopa County.

Historic Weedville

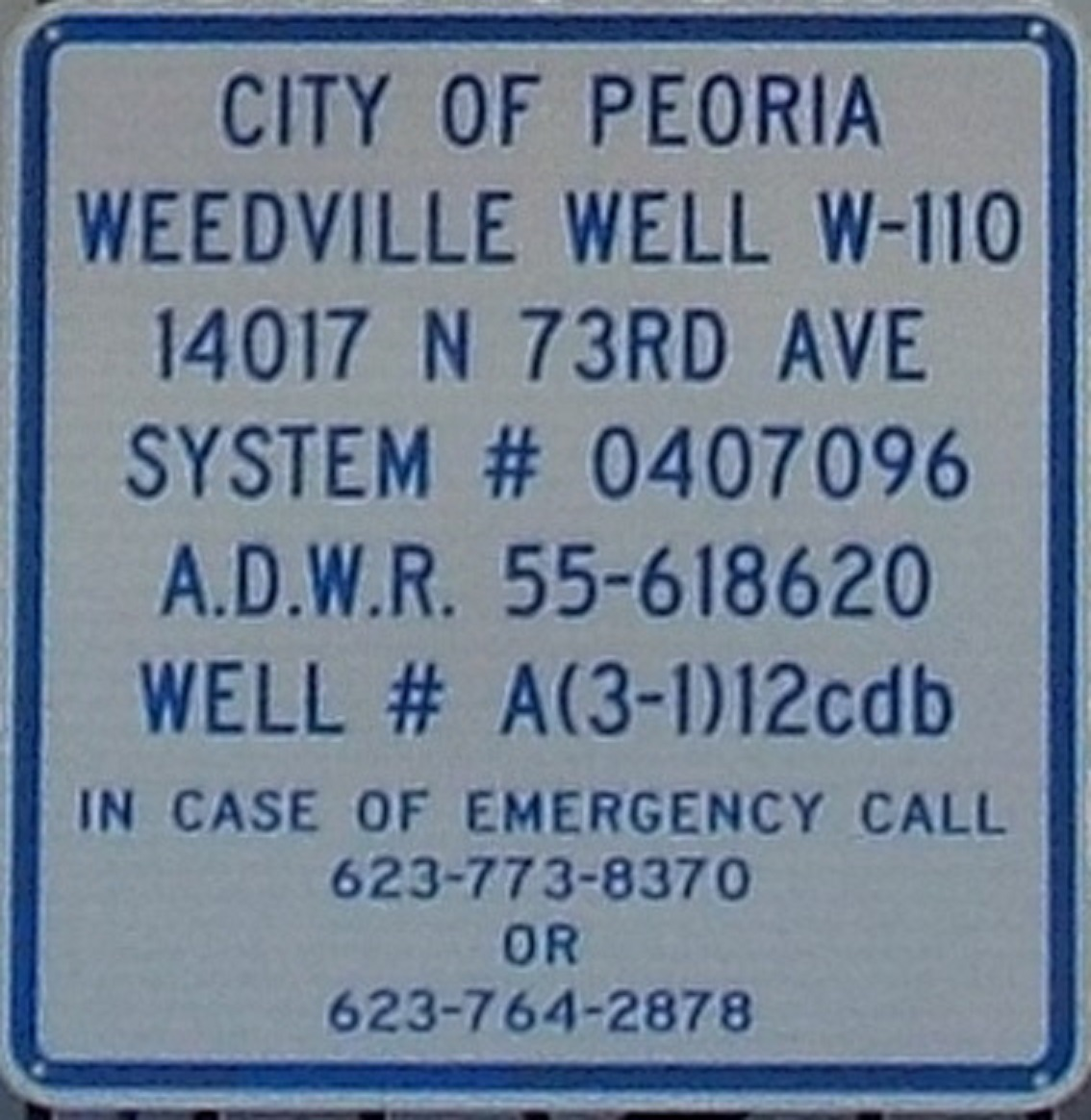
Weedville Water Well sign

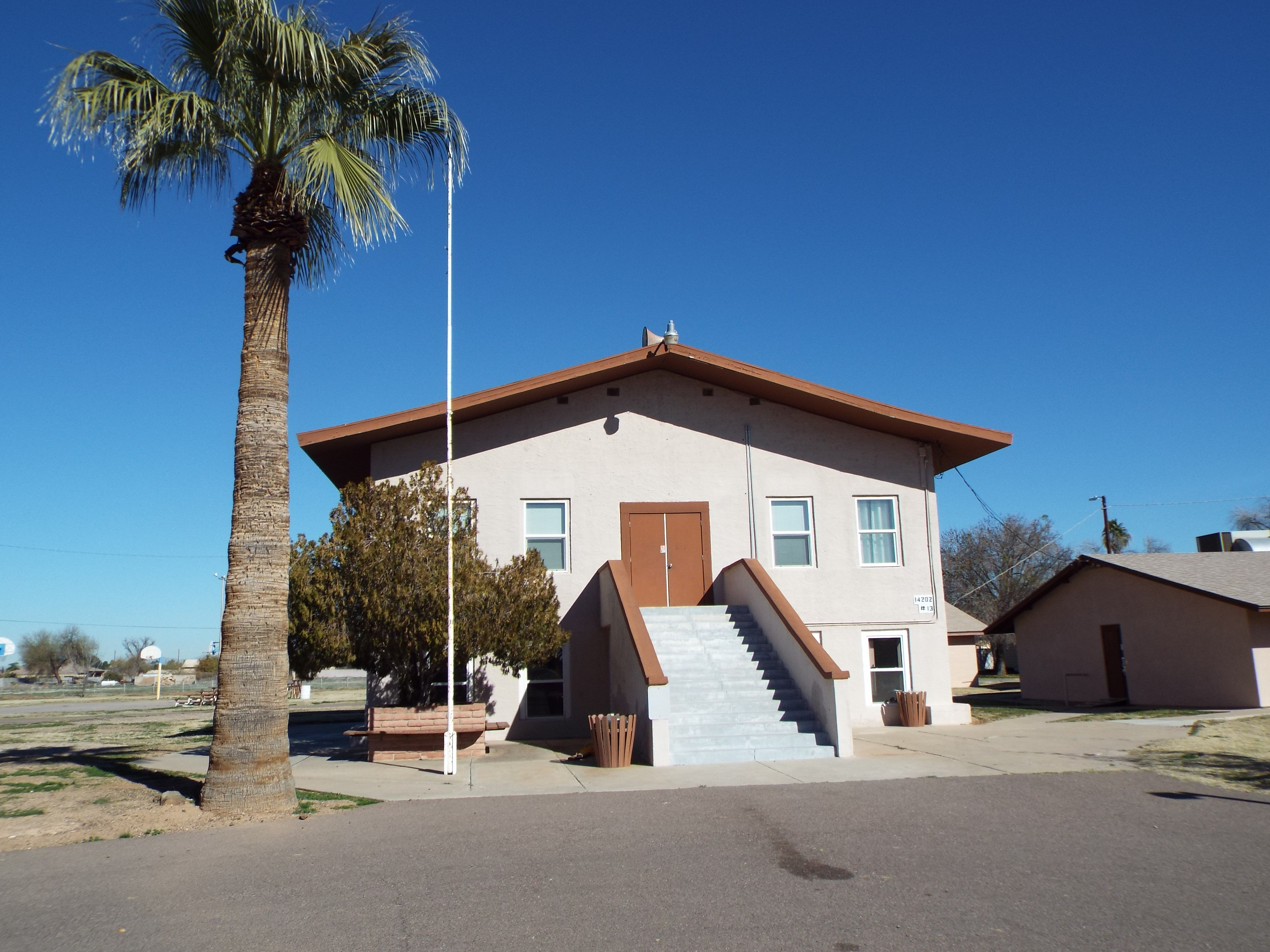
Old Path Church .

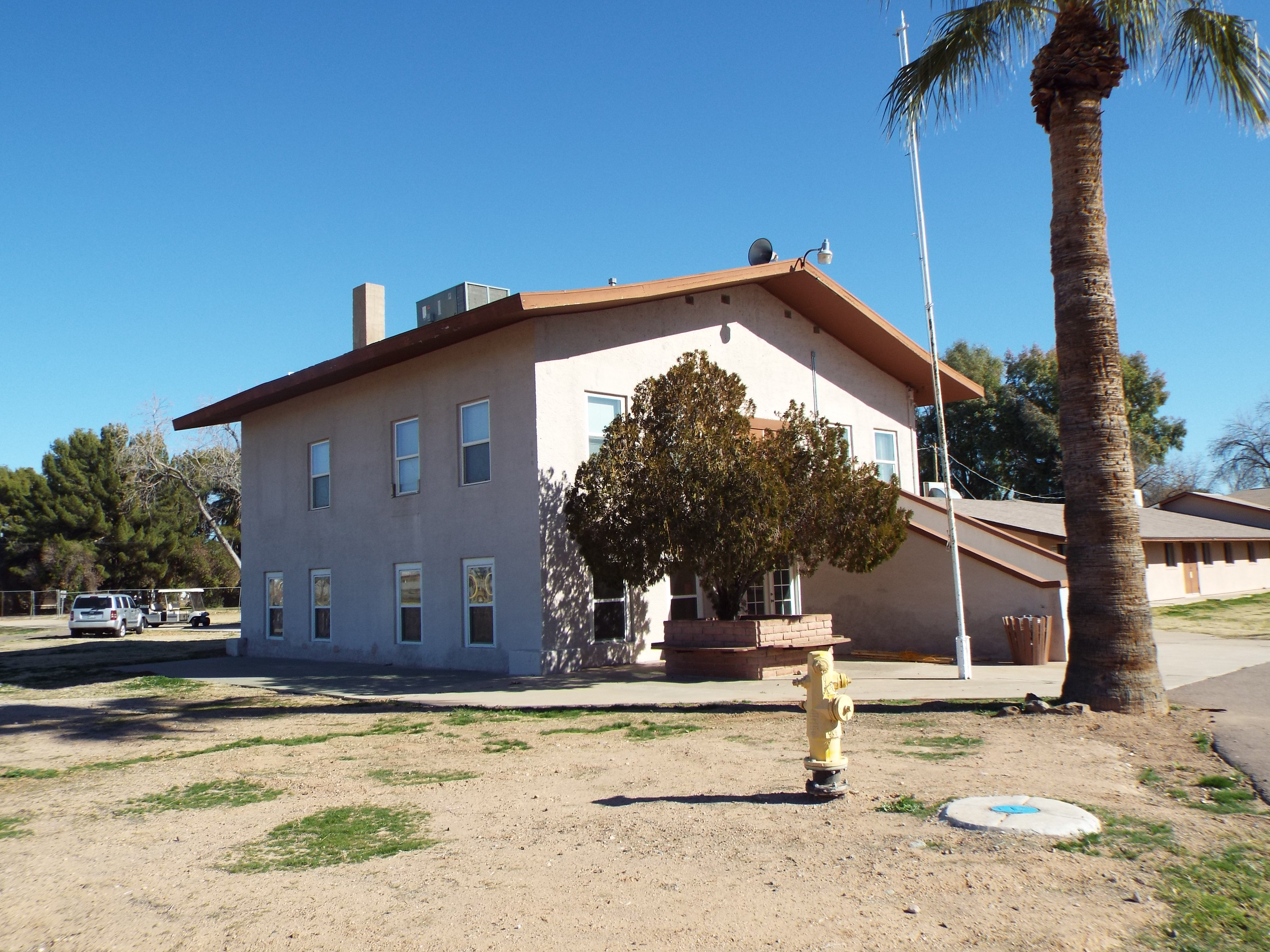
Different view of the Old Path Church .

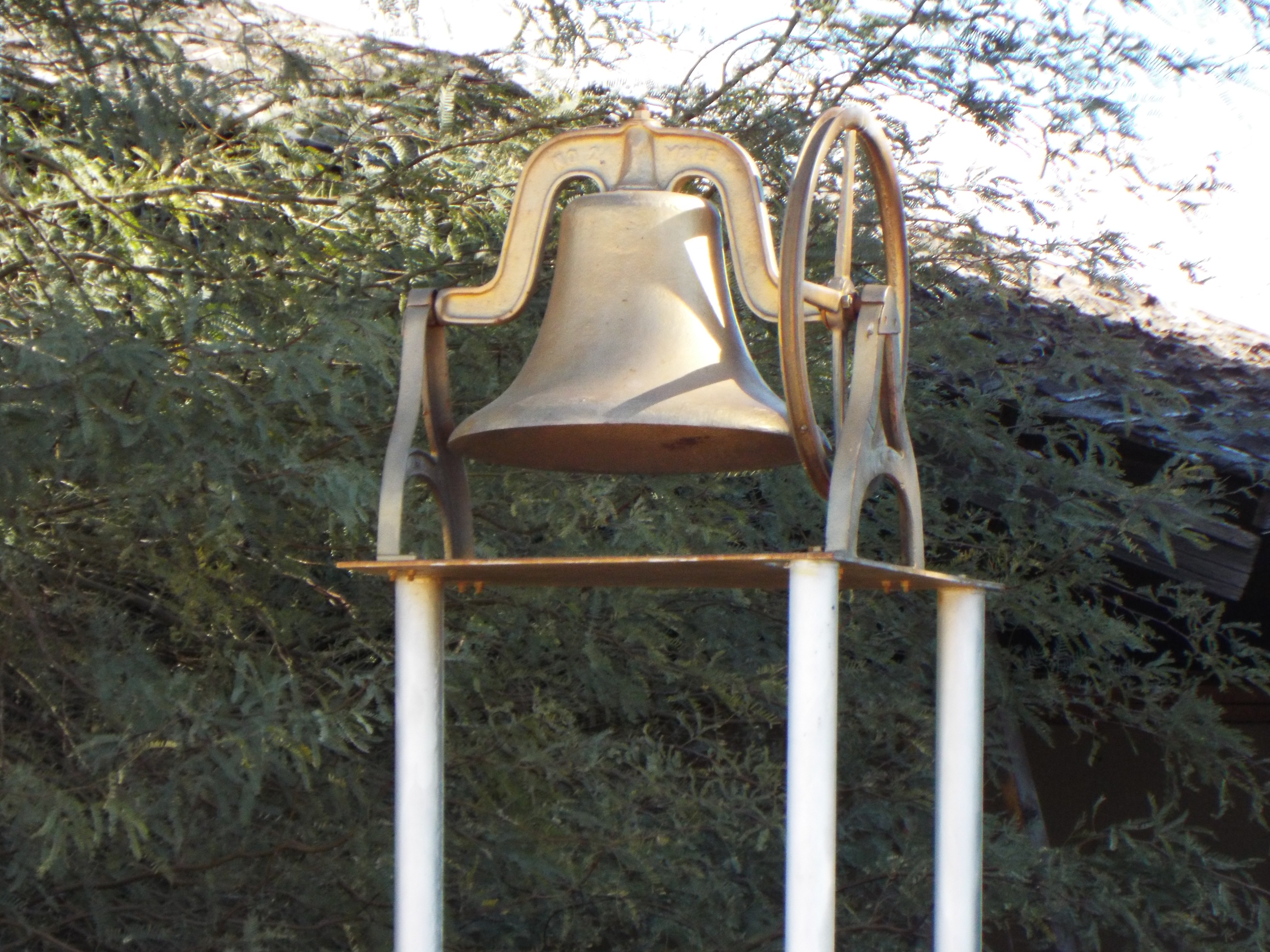
Original Old Path Church Bell.

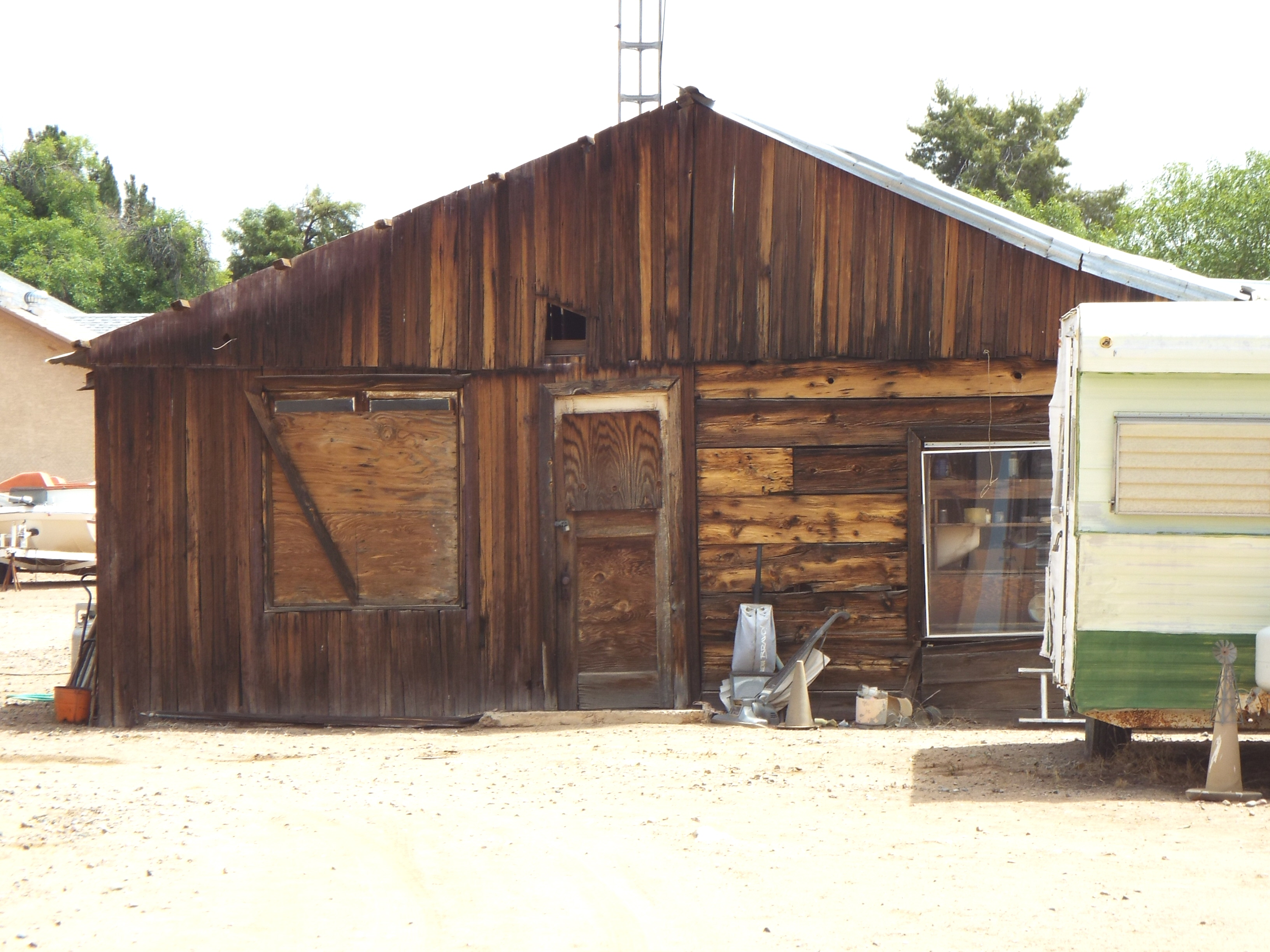
Old 1918 house in Weedville.

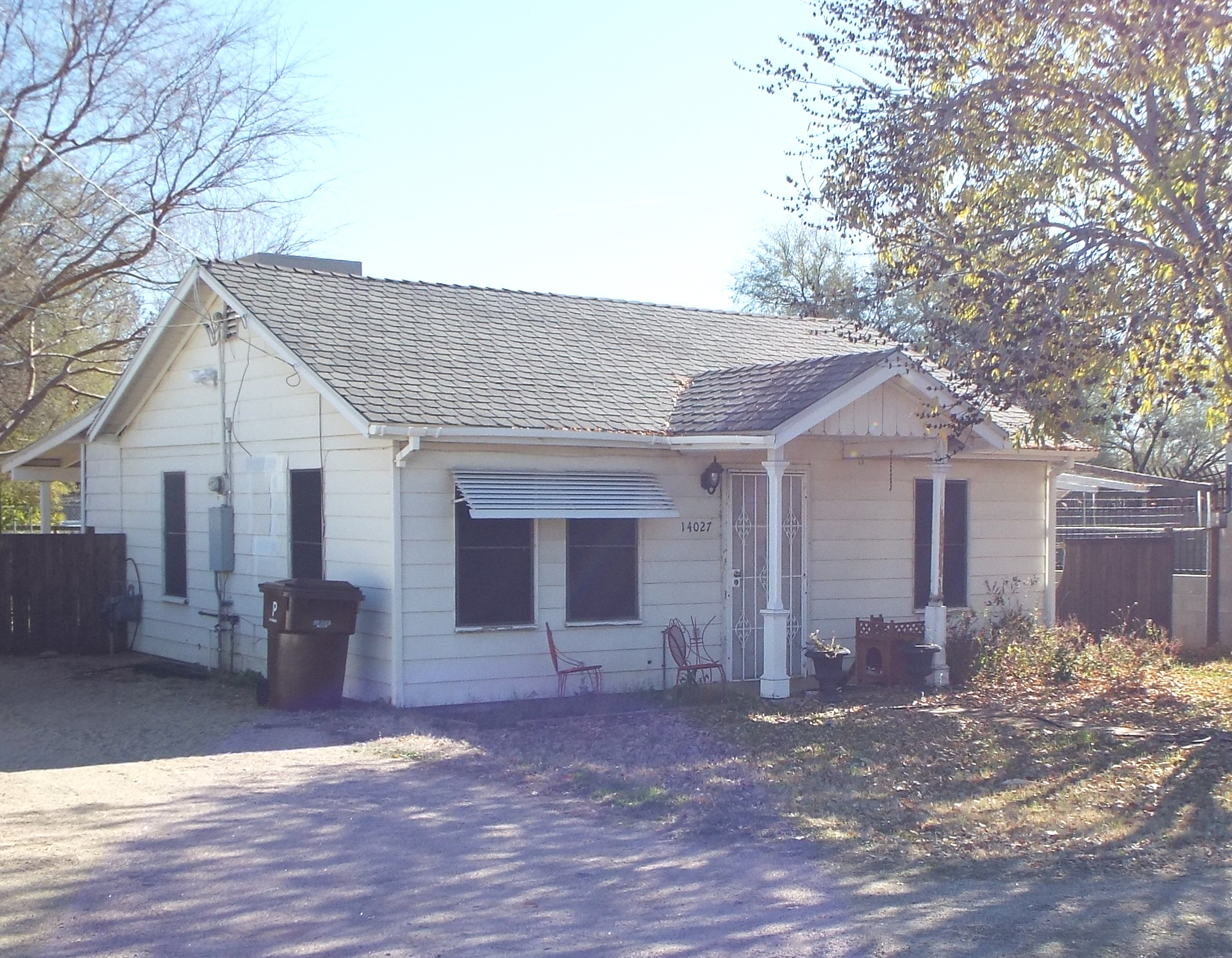
Early 1920s Weedville house .

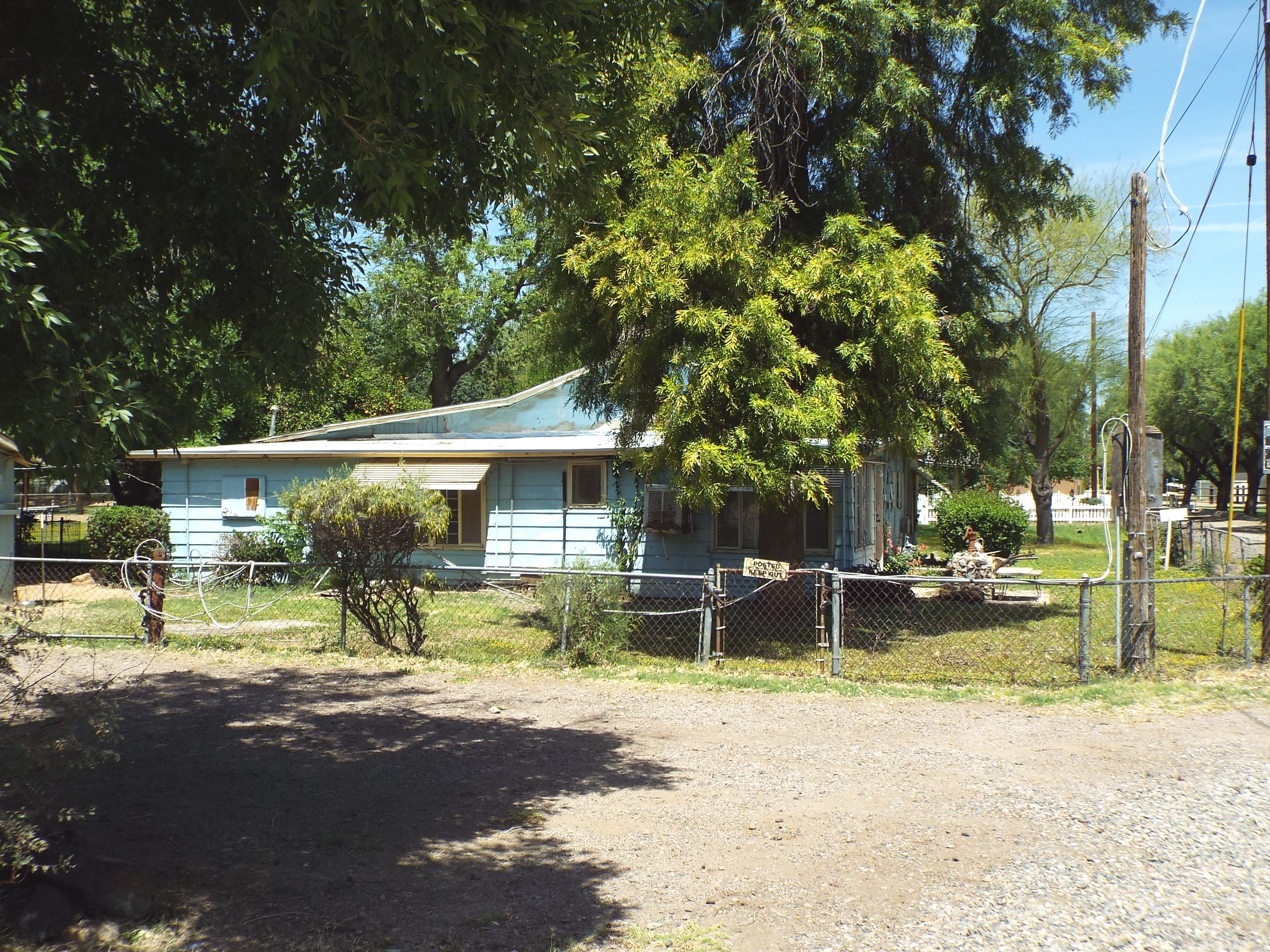
Another early 1920s Weedville house.

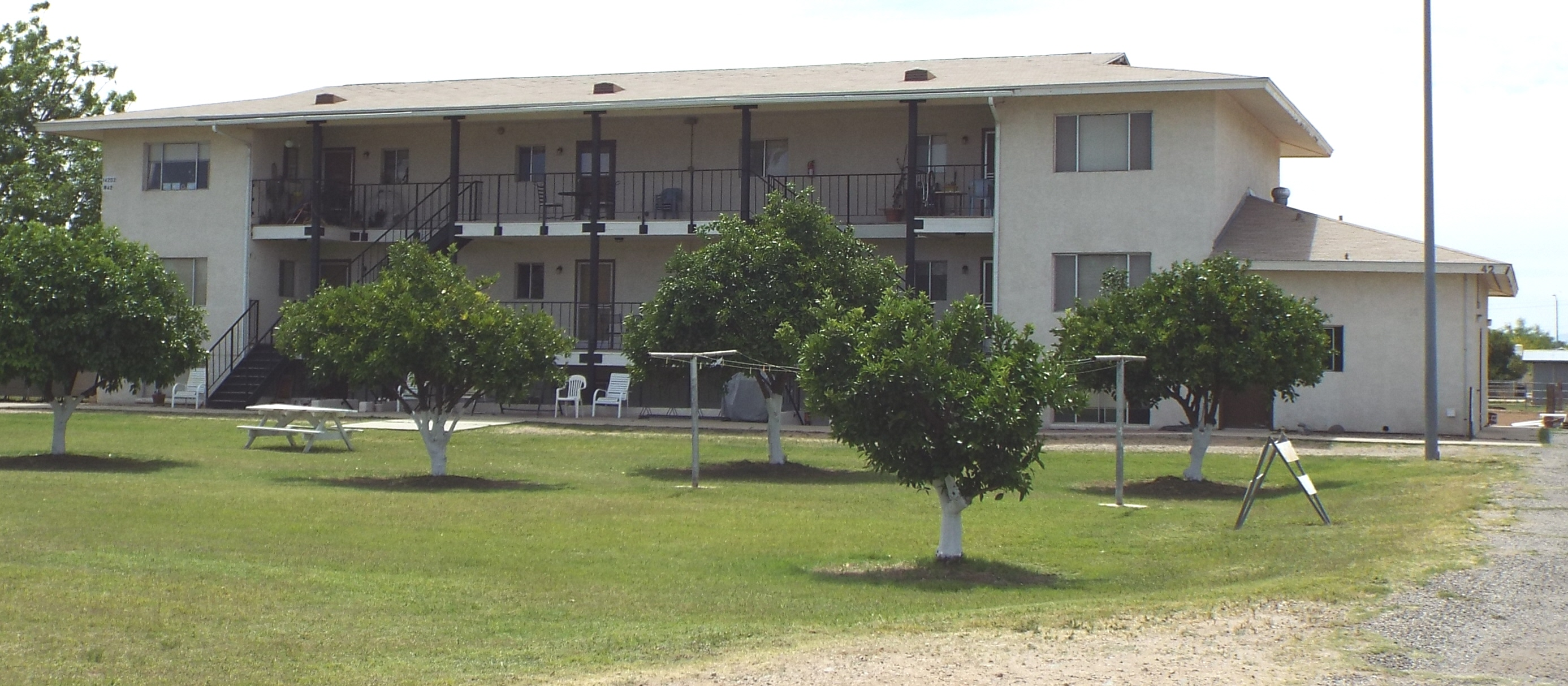
Early Weedville Boarding House.

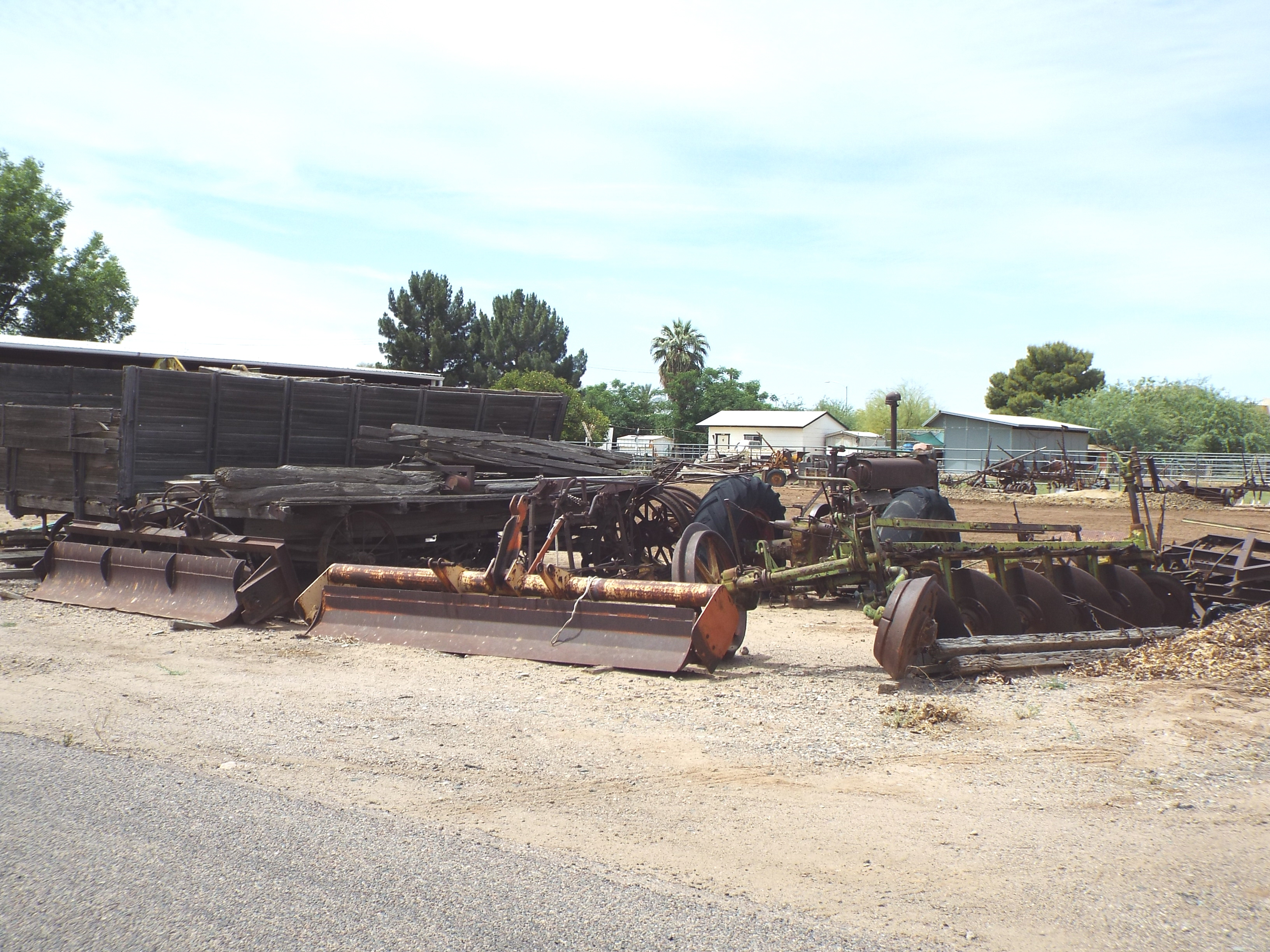
1920–1930 farm equipment used in Weedville.

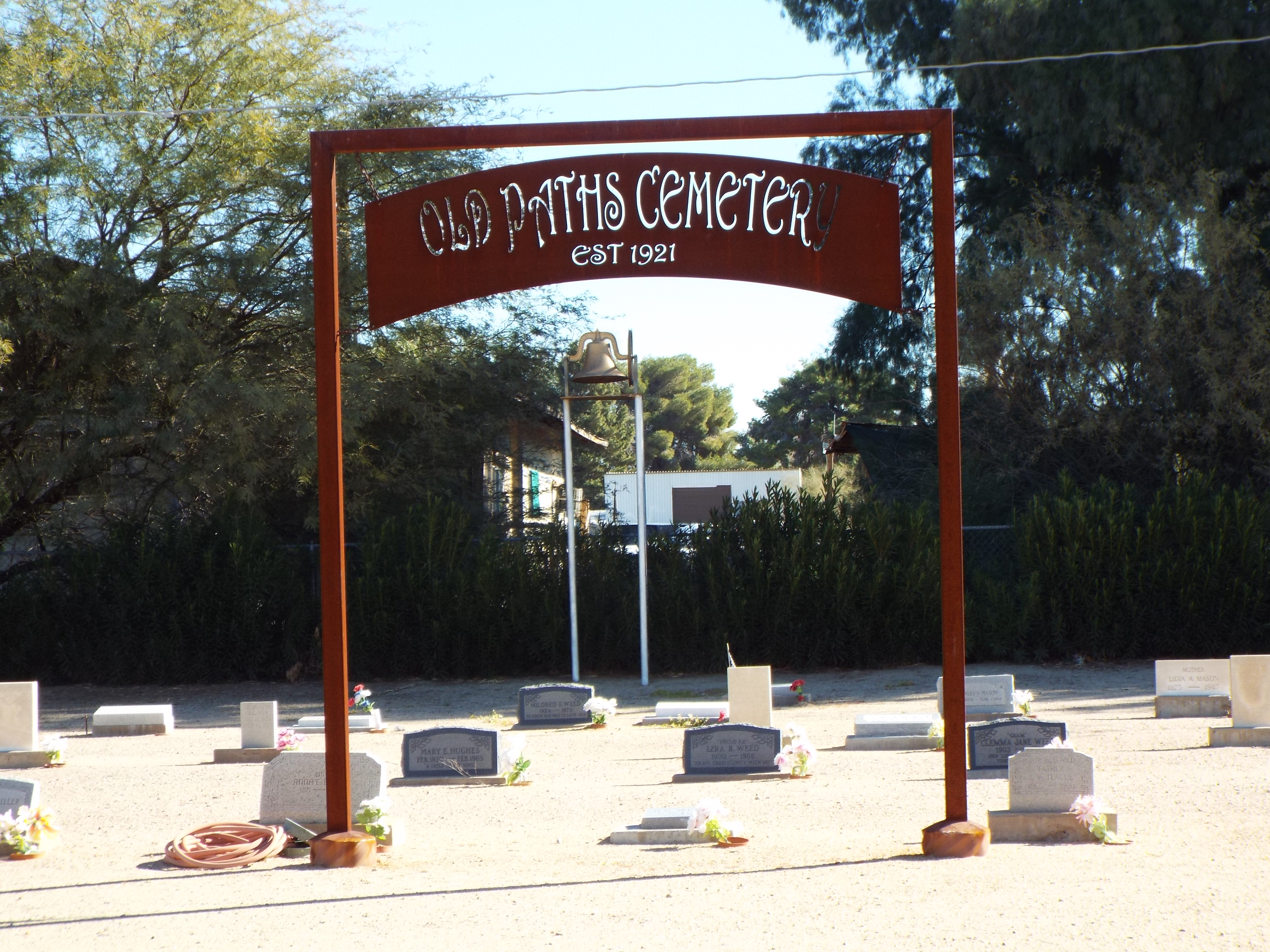
Old Paths Cemetery, established in 1921.

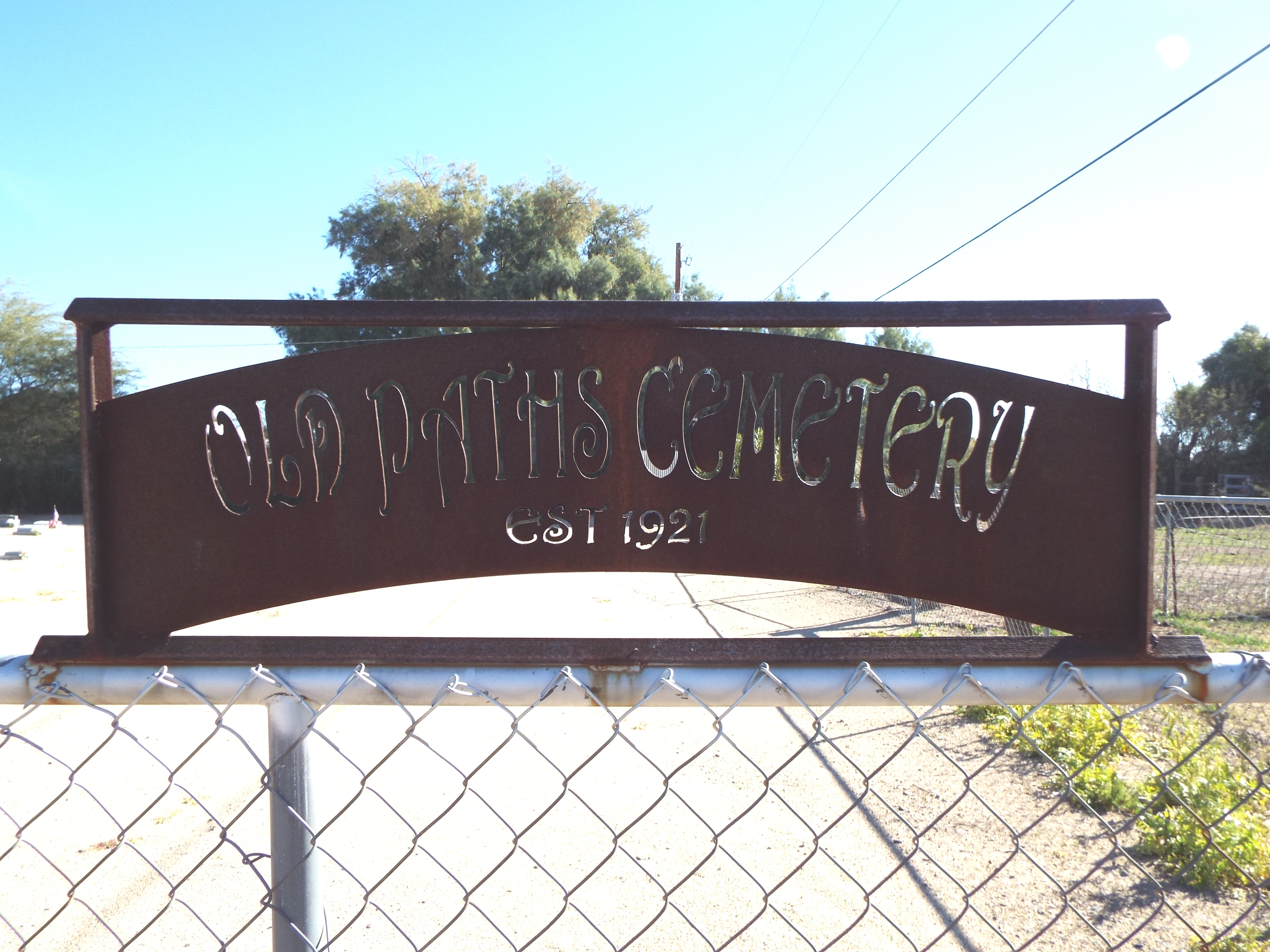
Entrance of the Old Paths Cemetery.

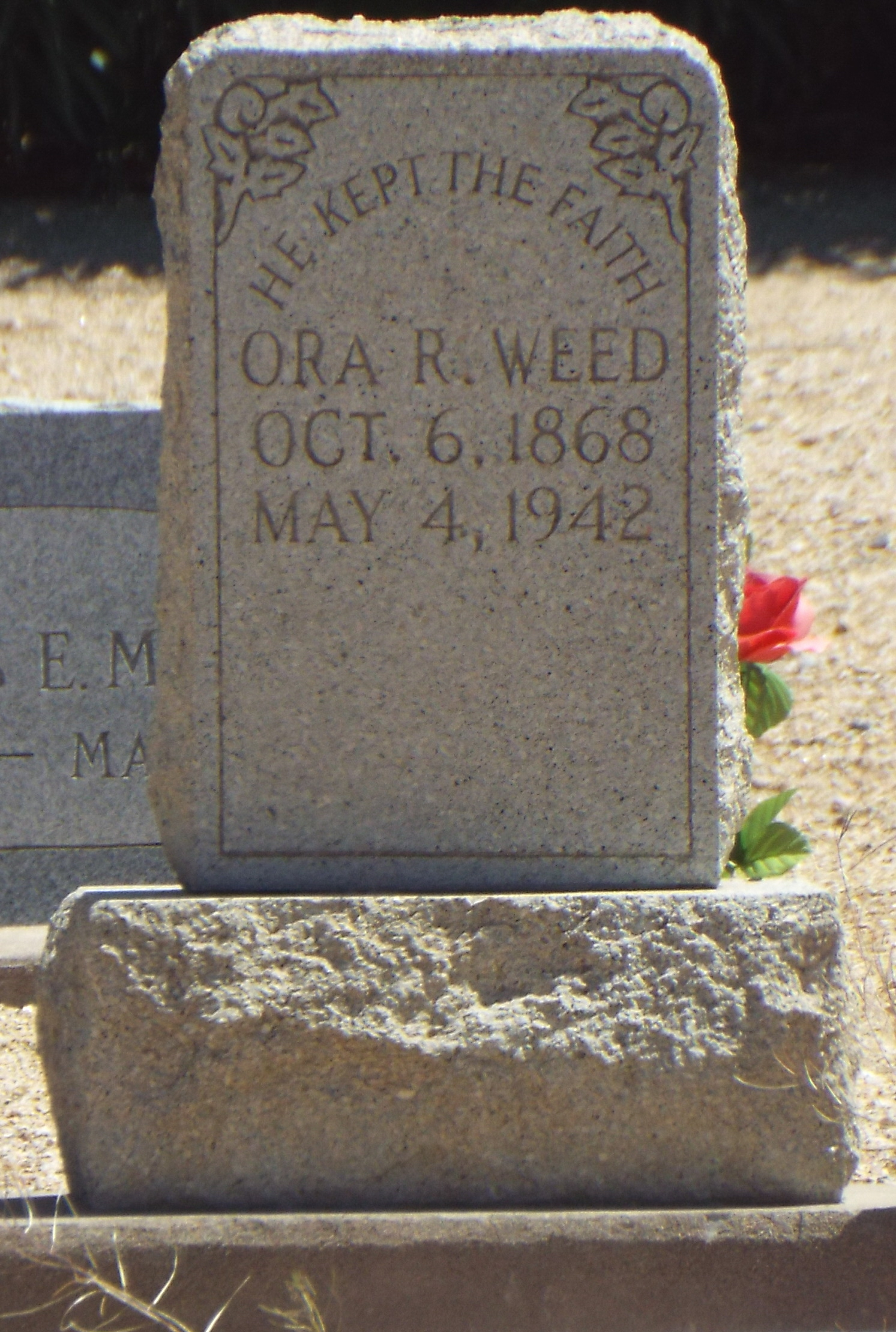
Grave of Weedville founder Ora R. Weed (1868–1942).

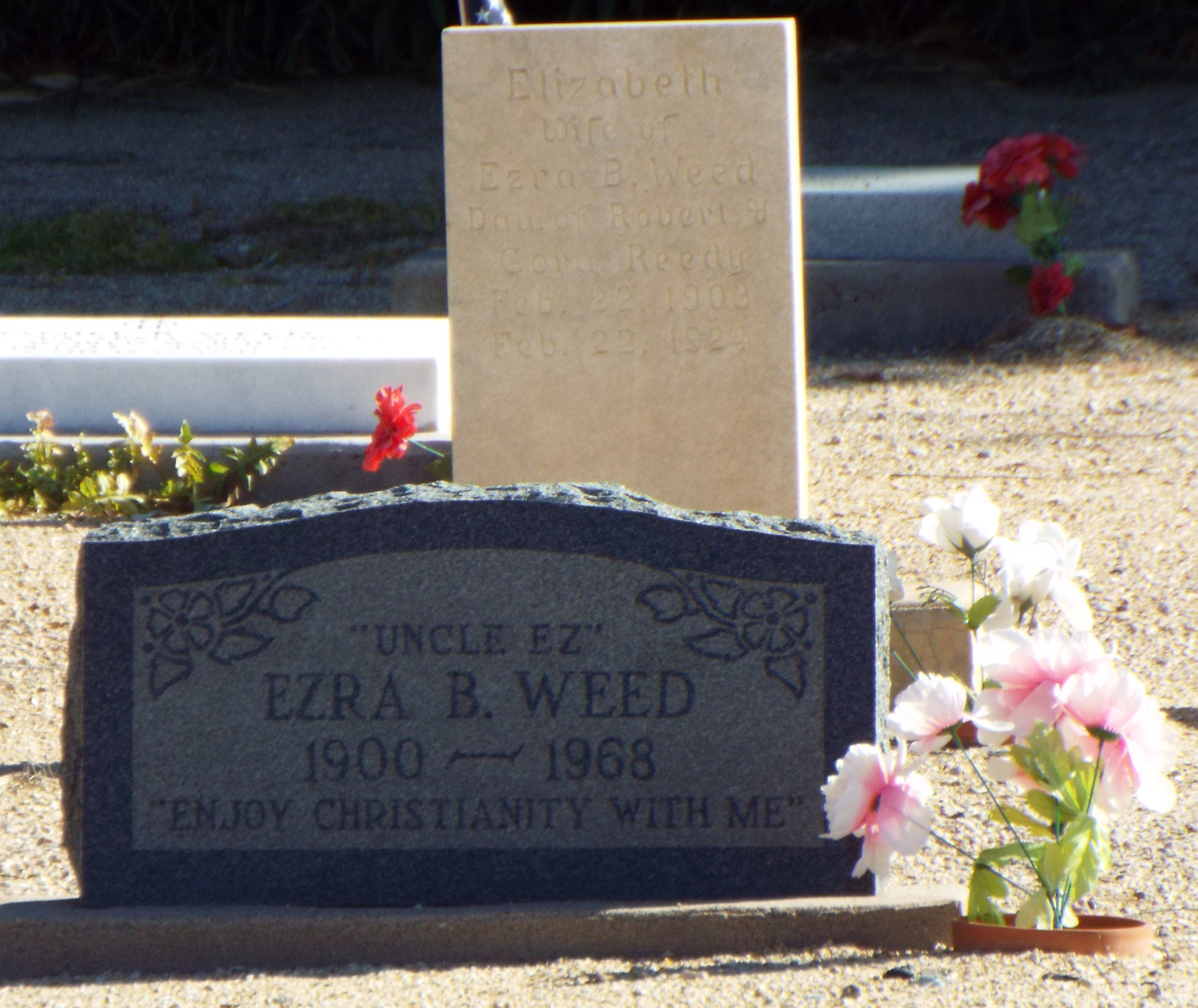
Graves of Erza Beeson Weed (1900–1968) (front) and his wife Elizabeth Weed (1903–1924). Erza was the son of the founders of Weedville Ora Rush Weed and Phoebe Pomeroy Weed.

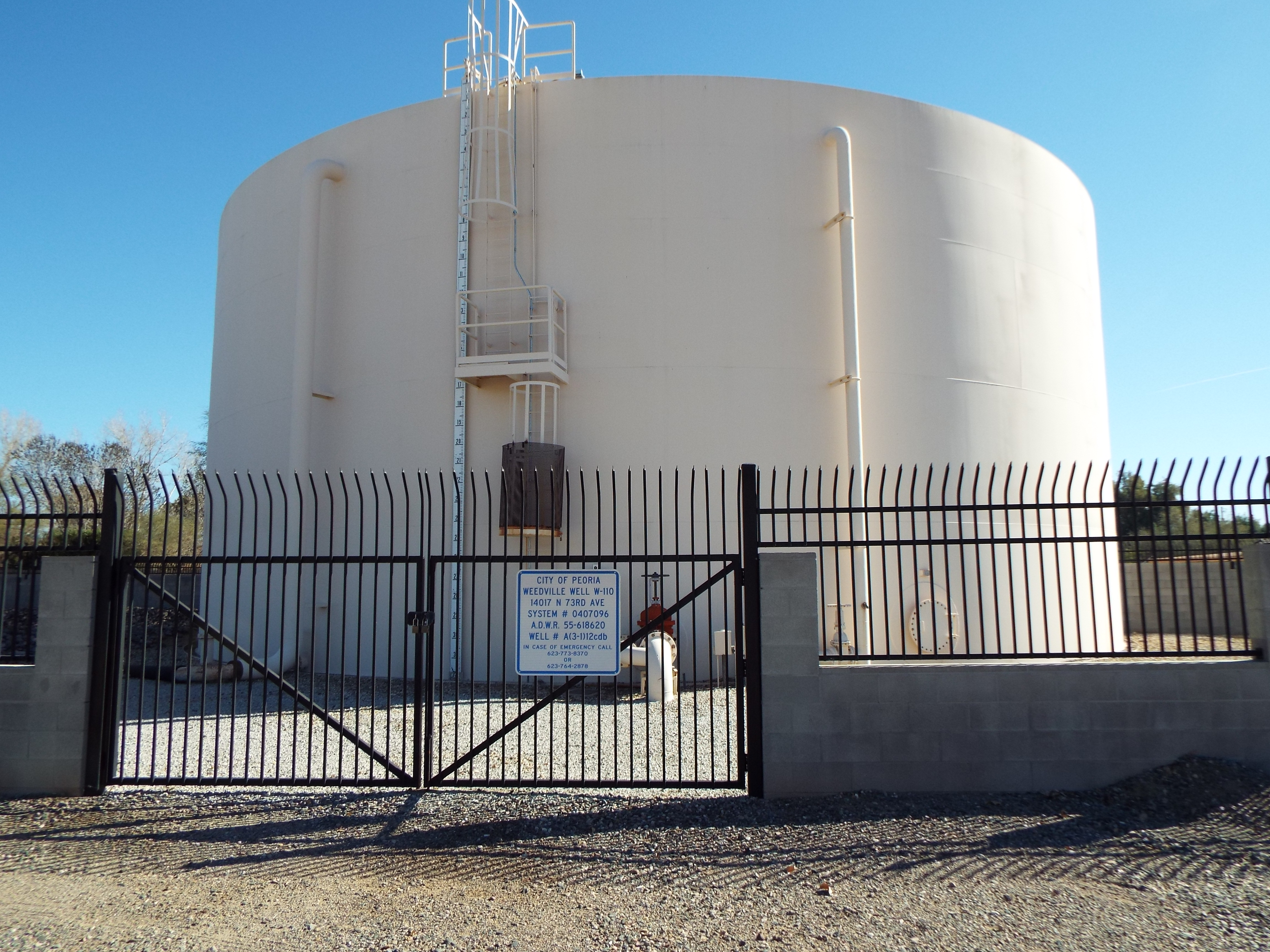
Weedville Water Well.

== See also ==
- Indian Mesa
- Peoria, Arizona
- Weedville, Arizona
- List of National Historic Landmarks in Arizona
- National Register of Historic Places listings in Arizona
- National Register of Historic Places listings in Maricopa County, Arizona
