= Indian Mesa =

Landform in the Lake Pleasant Regional Park, Arizona

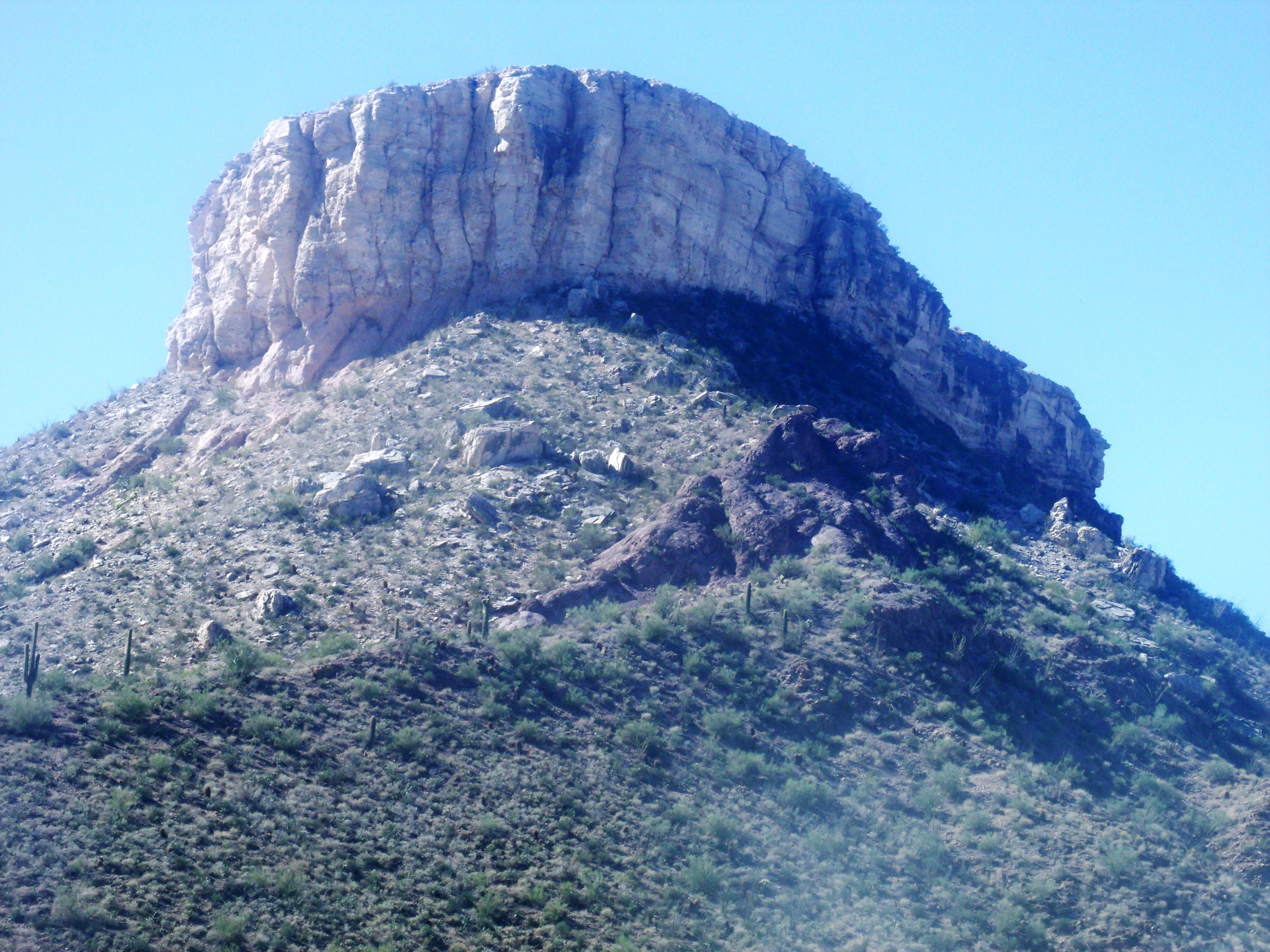
- Indian Mesa at Lake Pleasant Regional Park in Arizona.

Highest point
- Coordinates: 33°53′43″N 112°16′58″W

Geography
- Location within Arizona Location within the United States
- Country: United States
- State: Arizona
- Region: Lake Pleasant Regional Park; Agua Fria River
- County: Maricopa
- City: Peoria

Indian Mesa is a flat top hill whose sides are steep cliffs. Indian Mesa is located within the Lake Pleasant Regional Park grounds by the shores of Lake Pleasant and Agua Fria River in the Bradshaw Mountain Range. Lake Pleasant Regional Park is within the municipal boundaries of Peoria, Arizona. On top of the mesa there are ruins of a prehistoric Hohokam village which is monitored by the Arizona Site Stewards and considered an important archaeological site by the U.S. Bureau of Land Management. There is a small, steep and narrow path which begins at the skirt of the hill and leads to the top of the mesa.

== Indian Mesa and the Hohokam village ==
Indian Mesa is located in the Lake Pleasant Regional Park area which has an area of 10,000 acres (40 km^{2} or 15.6 mi^{2}). The lake is one of the most important artificial reservoirs surrounding the Phoenix metropolitan area and is filled by the Agua Fria River.

It is estimated that in the years AD 1000 to AD 1200, Native Americans from the Hohokam cultural tradition built a community which housed anywhere from 100 to 200 people on top of the mesa. The location presented an easily defensible position for the Hohokam of their village in the event that they were attacked by intruders.

Hohokam is an O'odham word used by archaeologists to identify a group of people who lived in the Sonoran Desert of North America. The Hohokam may have been the ancestors of the historic Akimel O'odham (Pima) and Tohono O'odham peoples in Southern Arizona. They developed an urban society built around irrigated agriculture, watered by an elaborate canal system.

The Hohokam men spent most of their time hunting, and the women tended the children and houses. The Hohokam used their houses for sleeping. They also used the houses for storage and as a defense against bad weather. They dug a posthole inside their houses and placed heavy mesquite or pine posts on them to support a roof. Among the ruins are fire pits which were used for cooking and for the making of pottery. The clay used to make pottery was gathered on the shore of the Agua Fria River. Even though the process of pottery making was a time-consuming one, the end product was a very useful one. The pots were used for serving water and if broken, the pieces were used for ornaments. The Hohokam also produced jewelry made of raw shell imported from northern Mexico which they traded.

The reason for which the Hohokam abandoned the village is unknown. There was a radical decline in the procurement and trade of raw shell from Mexico and its manufacture into jewelry. The transition from pit-houses (a primitive dwelling dug into the ground and roofed over) to pit-rooms and the introduction of spherical spindle whorls may have added to the relatively sudden and widespread abandonment or relocation of many Hohokam villages and a short-lived population decline. Archaeological evidence, such as the ones found at Indian Mesa, indicate that the Hohokam did not vanish nor did they abandon their village overnight. It is believed that the cultural collapse of the Hohokam was a process that lasted several generations and that what may have remained of their culture was passed on to their descendants, the Pima and Tohono O'odham peoples. The ruins in the mesa are some of the best-preserved pieces left behind by this Indian community. The ruins and the mesa are now under the jurisdiction of the U.S. Bureau of Land Management and monitored by the Arizona Site Stewards.

== Hiking Indian Mesa ==
A permit is not required to hike the mesa. The entrance to the area is reached from Phoenix, Arizona by travelling north on the I-17 highway and exiting at Table Mesa Road. The hike to the mesa is 3 miles from the designated vehicle parking area. The hike consists of a total of six miles round trip on a rocky terrain which is made up of a blend of desert and semi-desert ecosystems. The climb to the top of the mesa, whose height is approximately 400 feet, is reached through a steep and narrow path that has a dangerous hundred foot drop. Removal of artifacts are strictly forbidden.

On January 11, 2000, President Bill Clinton declared the area in which Indian Mesa is located the "Agua Fria National Monument" under the jurisdiction of the Bureau of Land Management.

As such the area, including the artifacts located on the site, are protected under the Antiquities Act of 1906. The act is a bill (16 USC 431–433) passed by the United States Congress and signed into law by President Theodore Roosevelt on June 8, 1906, which strictly forbids the removal of artifacts from Indian Mesa.

According to the law "Any person who shall appropriate, excavate, injure, or destroy any historic or prehistoric ruin or monument, or any object of antiquity, situated on lands owned or controlled by the Government of the United States, without the permission of the Secretary of the Department of the Government having jurisdiction over the lands on which said antiquities are situated, shall, upon conviction, be fined or be imprisoned for a period of not more than ninety days, or shall suffer both fine and imprisonment, in the discretion of the court."

== Gallery ==
The following pictures are of the thousand year old Hohokam village on top of Indian Mesa.

Hohokam village ruins on top of Indian Mesa
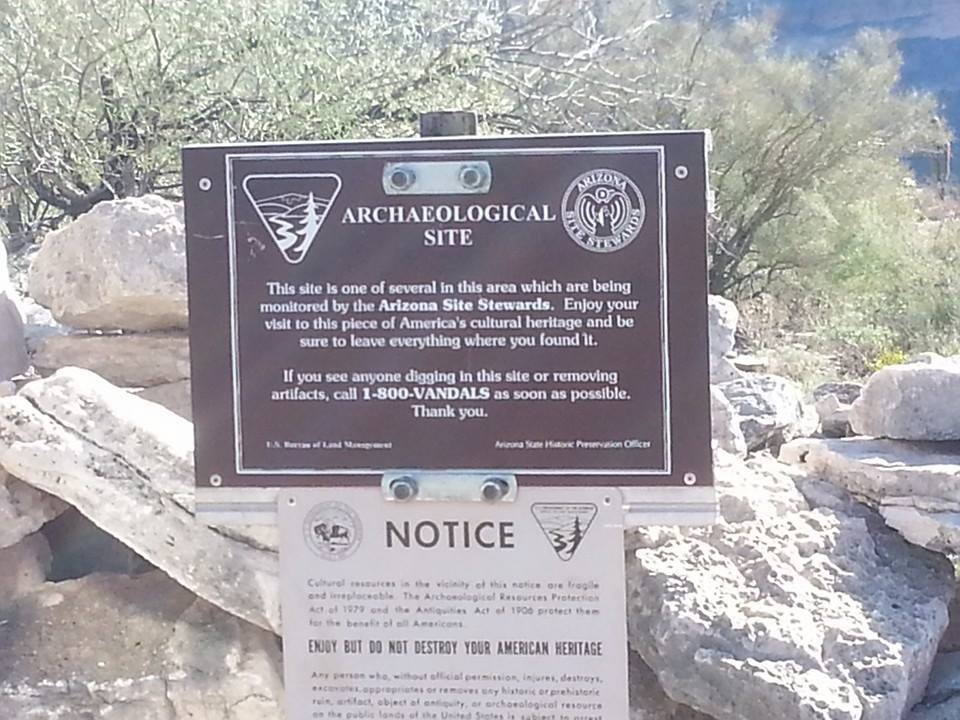
U.S. Bureau of Land Management Marker on Indian Mesa. The marker warns that removal of artifacts is strictly forbidden by Federal Law.

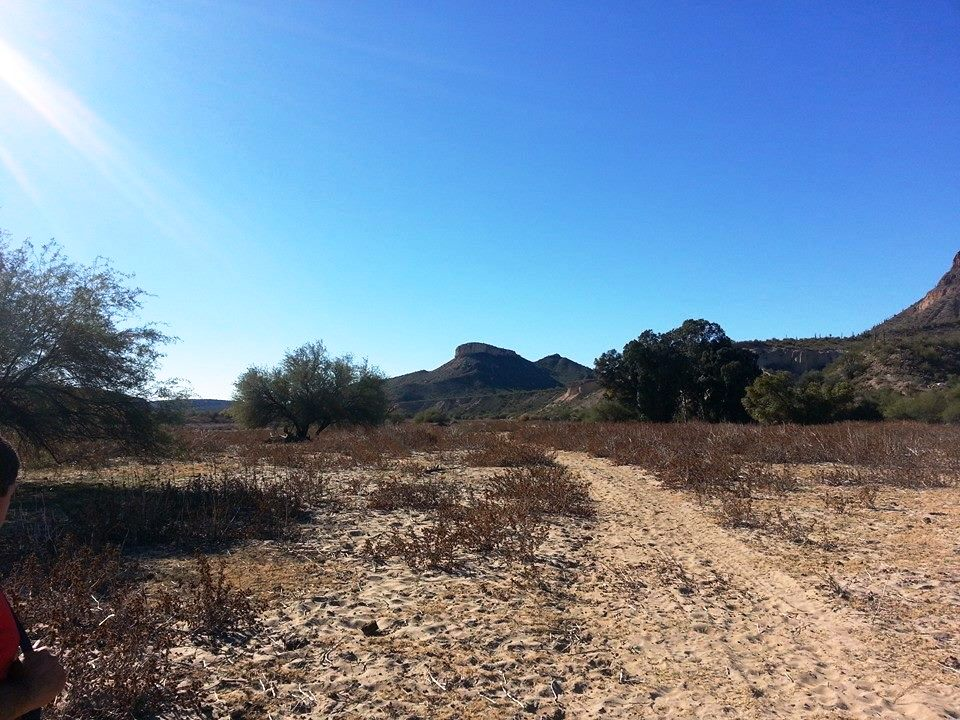
Hiking trail leading to the Indian Mesa (in the background). The hiking trail is located on a portion of a canal which the Hohokam built in 700 AD.. The canal is now filled with soil.

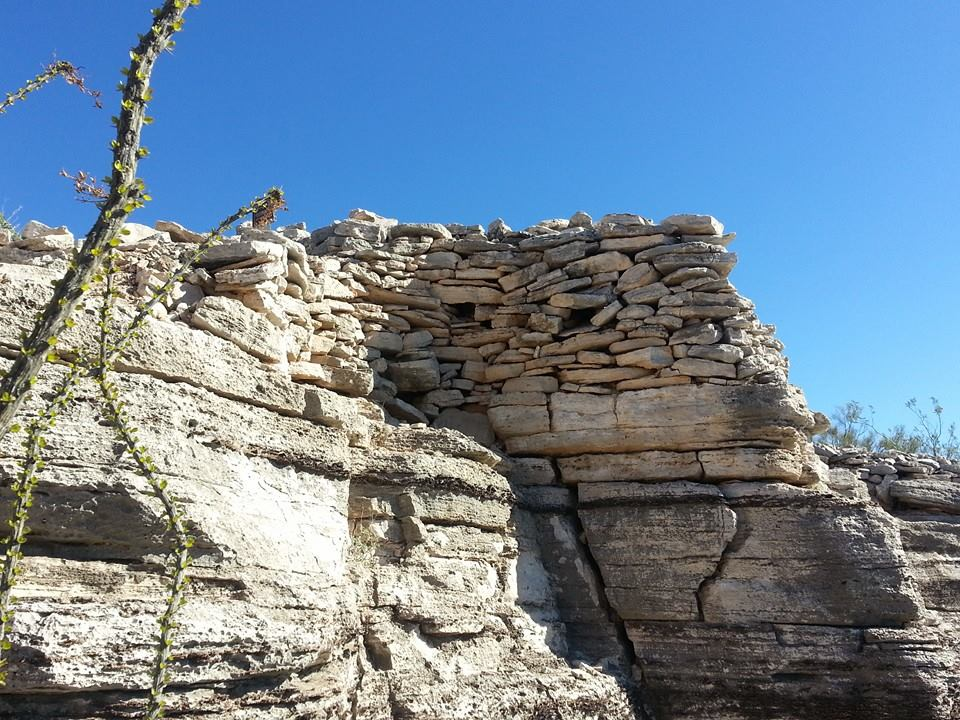
Different views of the ruins of a village built by Hohokam Puebloans about 1000 years ago on top of Indian Mesa. This is part of the wall of the fort that surrounded the village. The holes in the wall are viewing holes so the defenders can view the only path to the top. There are several branches of an "Ocotillo" shrub in the foreground.

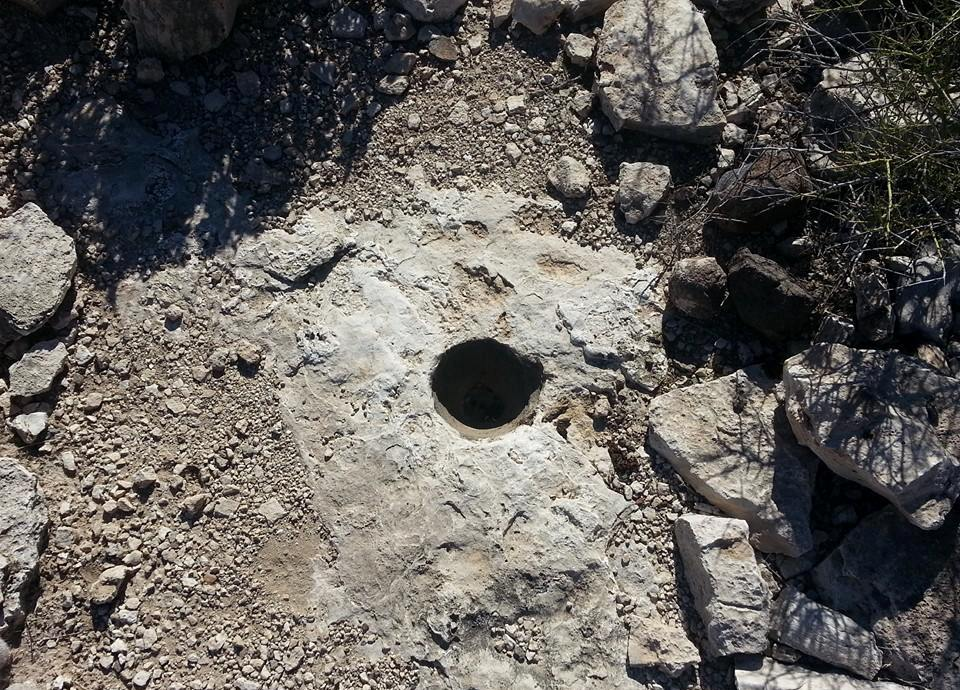
A posthole dug by the Hohokam inside their house. The Hohokam placed heavy mesquite or pine posts on them to support a roof.

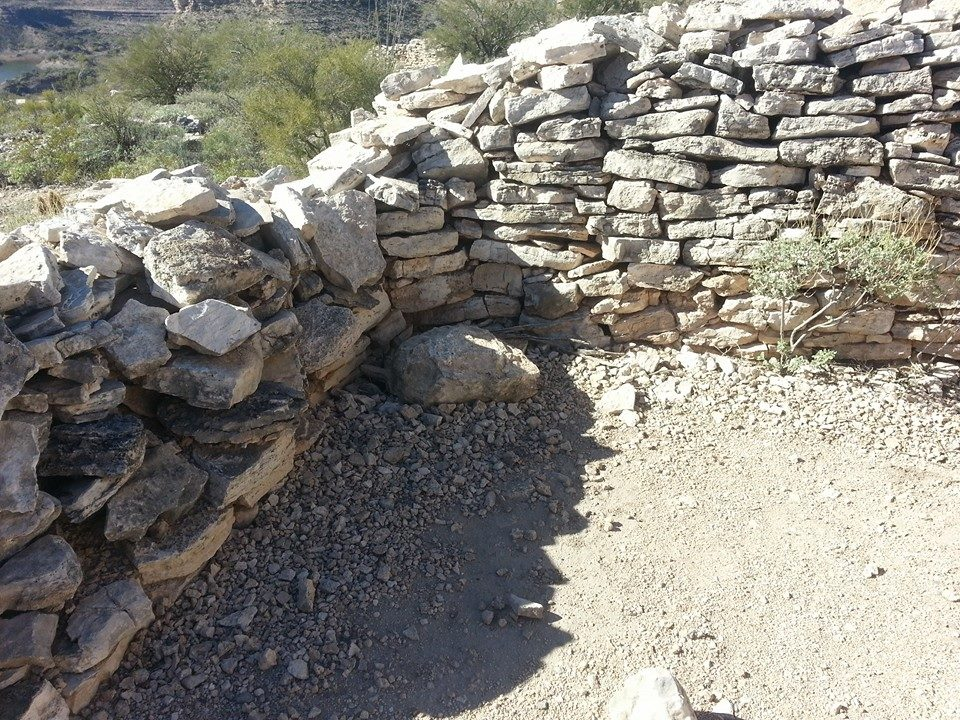
Different view of the ruins of a Hohokam house.

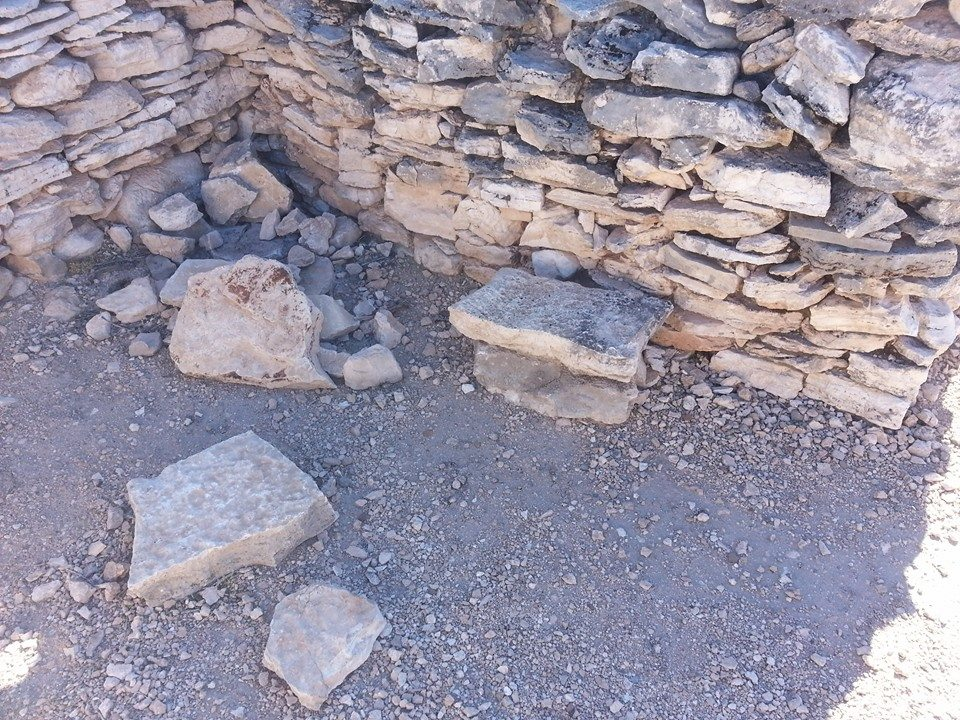
Another view of the ruins of a Hohokam house.

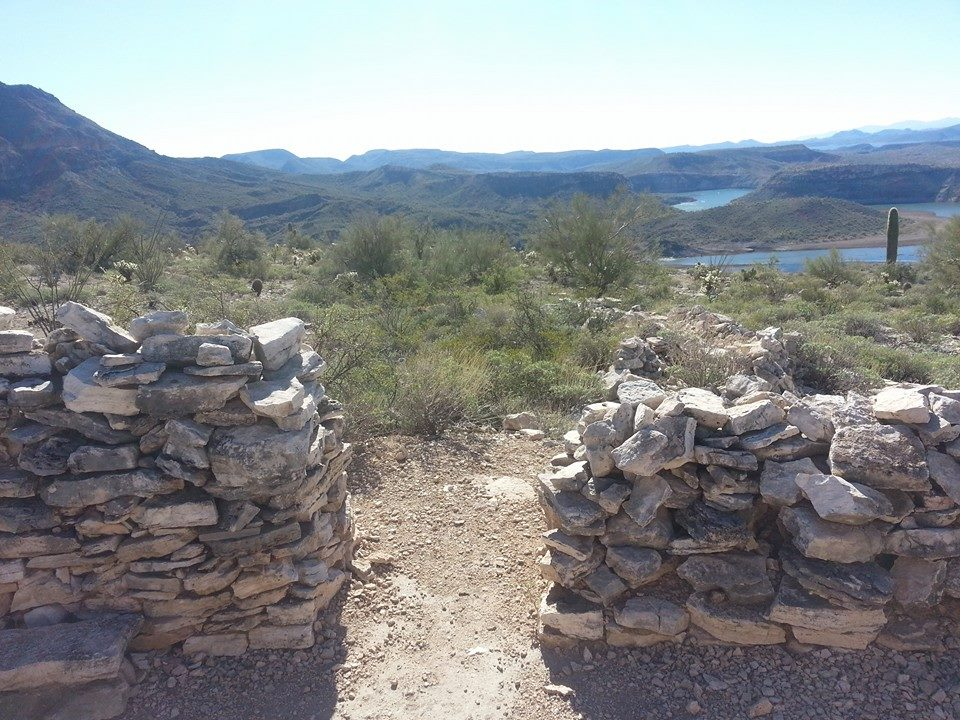
Entrance to a Hohokam home. Lake Pleasant is in the background.

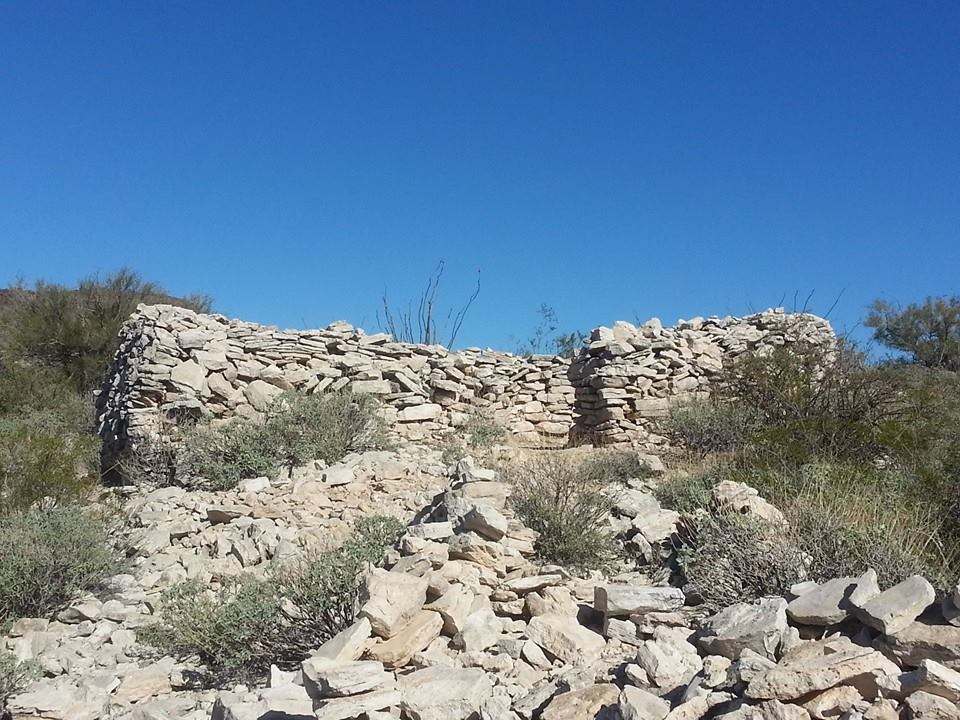
Rocky trail leading to the entrance of a Hohokam house.

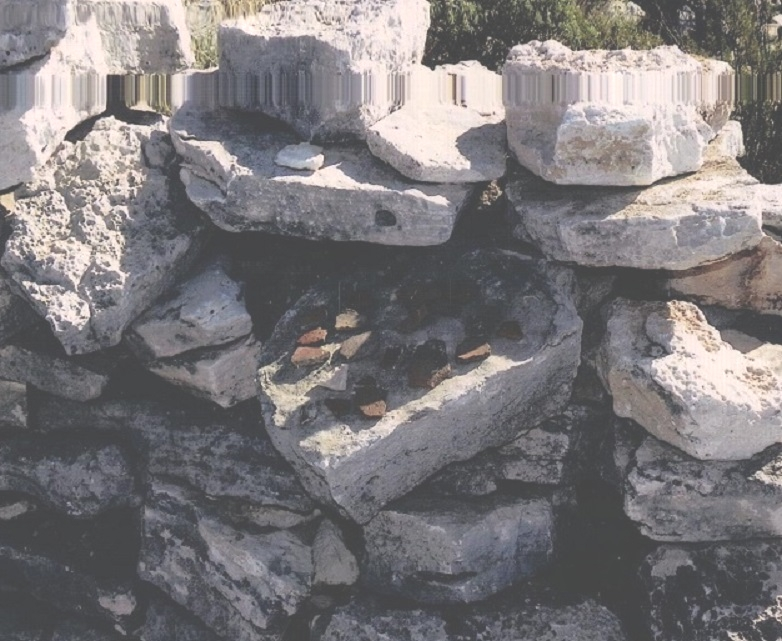
Ancient Hohokam pottery pieces (small brown ones) found at Indian Mesa.

== See also ==
- List of historic properties in Peoria, Arizona
- Lake Pleasant Regional Park
- Lake Pleasant Camp
- Rio Vista Pond
- Weedville
- Sears-Kay Ruin
