= Wing F. Ong =

Arizona state representative (1904–1977)

Wing Foon Ong
- Official 1949 Arizona State Legislature portrait of Wing Ong

Arizona House of Representatives
- In office 1946–1950

Arizona State Senate
- In office 1966–1968

Personal details
- Born: Ong Yut Ning; February 4, 1904 Canton, Guangdong, China
- Died: December 19, 1977 (aged 73) Phoenix, Arizona, US
- Resting place: Greenwood/Memory Lawn Mortuary & Cemetery
- Party: Democratic
- Spouse: Rose Wong Ong
- Profession: Small business owner, lawyer

Wing Foon Ong (born Ong Yut Ning; February 4, 1904 – December 19, 1977) was a Chinese-born businessman, lawyer, and politician in Arizona. In 1946 he was elected to the Arizona House of Representatives, becoming the first Chinese-born person elected to a state House of Representatives in the United States. In 1966, Ong was elected to the Arizona State Senate, becoming the first Chinese-American to enter the State Senate.

== Early years ==
Ong was born in Kaiping, Guangdong, China to Ong Dao Lung, a United States-born Chinese-American, and Wong Shee. The family was going through a difficult economic situation and young Ong began his formal education sitting under a tree with the other boys in his native village. Ong found work as a cabin boy where he helped the cook in the ship's kitchen and carried buckets of food from the ship's kitchen to the forecastle where the ordinary seamen ate.

In 1919, Ong arrived in the United States via California's Angel Island in San Francisco. The fourteen-year-old was incarcerated for three months while authorities double-checked his United States citizenship.

== Life in Phoenix ==
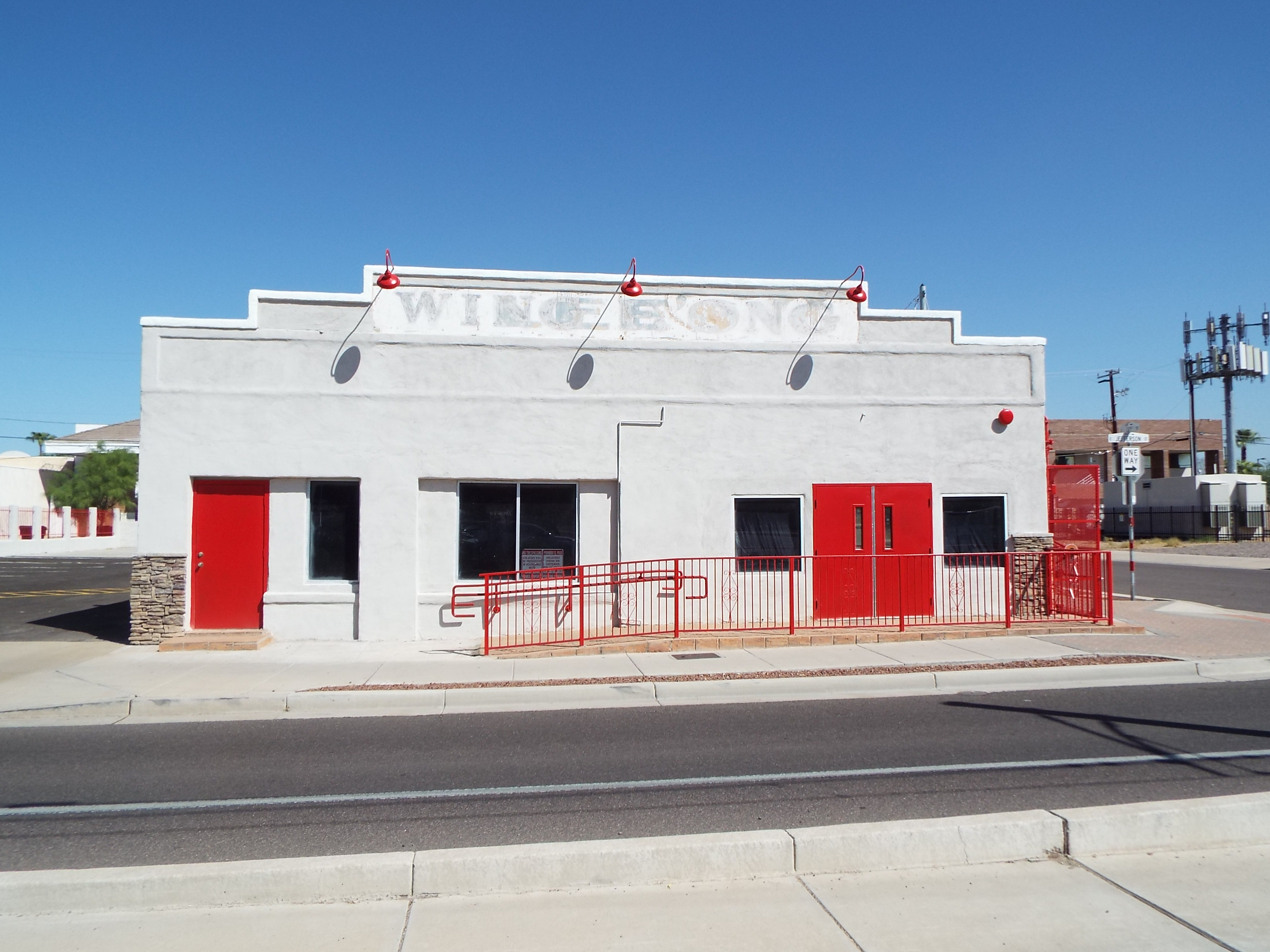
Wing F. Ong Grocery where Ong also had his law office

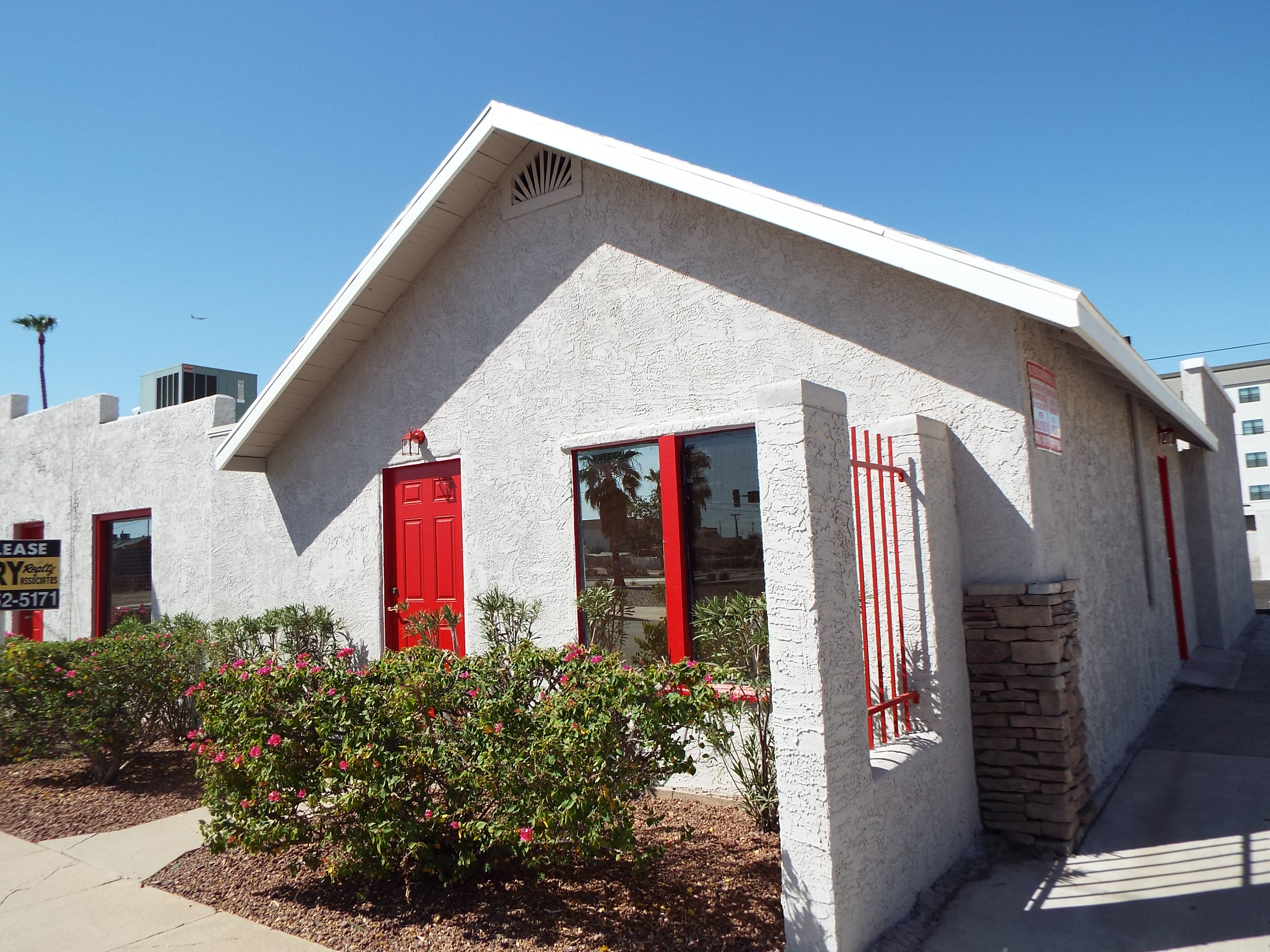
House in the back of the store where the Ong family lived

Ong lived in California during an era when California law excluded children from segregated schools if they did not already know English. In 1920 he moved to Phoenix and went to live with the family of his uncle Henry Ong Sr. He entered first grade at Grant Elementary School. In four years he completed elementary school and two years later graduated from Phoenix Union High School. He was employed by Arizona Governor Thomas E. Campbell as a houseboy during his high school years.

Ong joined his uncle and cousins in the family business. However, his true passion was to become a lawyer someday. In 1927, his uncle, Henry, arranged a traditional Chinese marriage to sixteen-year-old Rose Wong, a girl whom Ong had never met. His first encounter with his future wife was the same day that she arrived from China. The arranged wedding required a pact between both participants. He promised to help her brother and sister immigrate to the United States and she promised to support him in his goal to become a lawyer.

In 1938, Ong, together with his uncle Henry and various Chinese-American merchants, formed the Chinese Chamber of Commerce to protect and promote their businesses.

== University of Arizona ==
Soon Ong established his own store at 1246 East Jefferson Street. He kept his promise and his brother-in-law and sister-in-law immigrated to the U.S. His first child was born in the back of the grocery store where he worked and lived. Ong enrolled at the University of Arizona in Tucson and studied law. One of his classmates was future U.S. Senator Barry Goldwater. His wife and in-laws ran the store while he attended law school. The Campbells were so impressed by Ong when he worked for them that they financially supported him through law school.

In 1943, he graduated at the top of his law class and became an immigration attorney. At the time he was one of only eight Chinese-American lawyers in the U.S. Ong set up a storefront law office next to his grocery store, the Wing F. Ong Grocery Store at 1246 East Jefferson Street.

== Politics ==
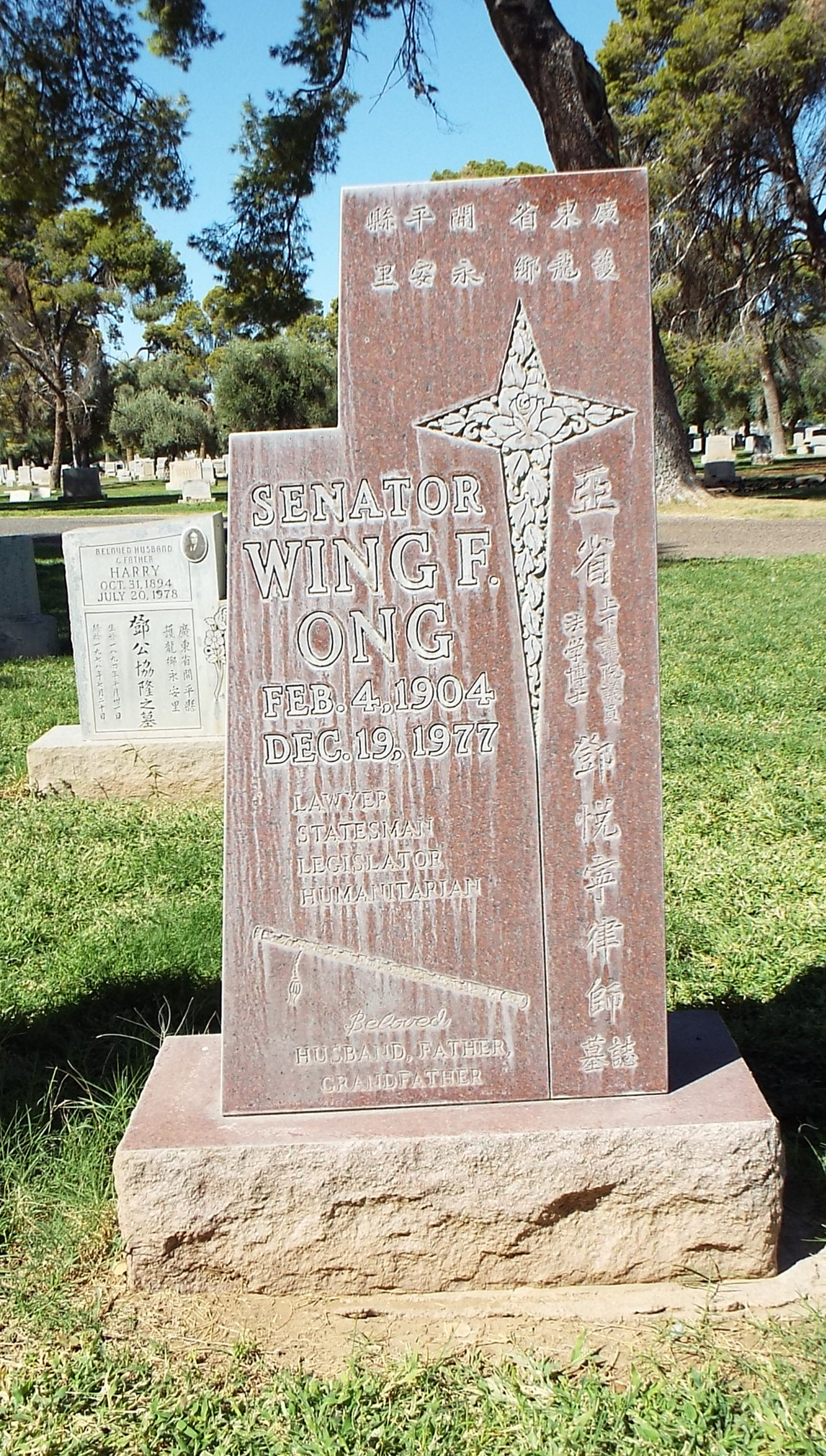
Gravesite of Wing Foon Ong

In 1944, Ong ran for the Arizona House of Representatives and lost by 17 votes. He continued his law practice and in 1946, ran for the State House of Representatives as a Democrat and was elected. He thus became the first Chinese American in the United States to be elected to a state legislative body. His campaign slogan was "Give the person who knows the law a chance to participate in politics".

He served two terms from 1946 to 1950 in said political position. As state representative, he backed welfare, education and job-security measures for those less fortunate.

As an immigration attorney Ong continued to help other Chinese immigrants from San Francisco who were facing the same difficulties and discrimination that he faced during his own immigration process. He practiced law for a short period of time in San Francisco, and in 1956, returned to Phoenix with his family. Ong then established a Chinese restaurant which he named "Wing's Restaurant" at 1617 E. Thomas Road. He established his law office on the second floor of the restaurant.

In 1965, Arizona Governor Sam Goddard appointed Ong as goodwill ambassador to China. In 1966, he ran for the State Senate of Arizona and was elected, becoming the first Chinese-American who entered the State Senate. He served one term from 1966 to 1968 in said position.

== Later years ==
Ong purchased a new house at 2702 N. 7th Street. He returned to his law practice after he retired from politics. He died on December 19, 1977, aged 73, in Phoenix. He is buried in Phoenix's Greenwood/Memory Lawn Mortuary & Cemetery.

== See also ==
- Arizona
- List of historic properties in Phoenix
- Adam Perez Diaz

=== Arizona pioneers ===
- Mansel Carter
- Bill Downing
- Henry Garfias
- Winston C. Hackett
- John C. Lincoln
- Paul W. Litchfield
- Joe Mayer
- William John Murphy
- Levi Ruggles
- Sedona Schnebly
- Michael Sullivan
- Trinidad Swilling
- Ora Rush Weed
- Henry Wickenburg
