= Ora Rush Weed =

Arizona pioneer (1868–1942)

Rev. Ora Rush Weed
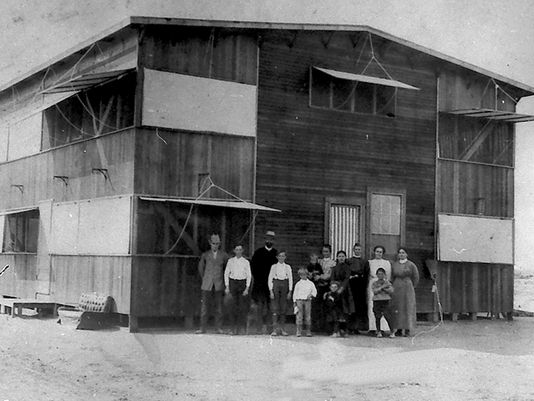
- Rev. Ora Rush Weed and his family in front of their home in 1912.
- Born: October 6, 1868; Hardin, Ray County, Missouri
- Died: May 4, 1942 (aged 73); Glendale, Arizona
- Occupation: Preacher
- Spouse: Phoebe Pomeroy Weed

Notes
- Rev. Weed was the founder of Weedville, Arizona

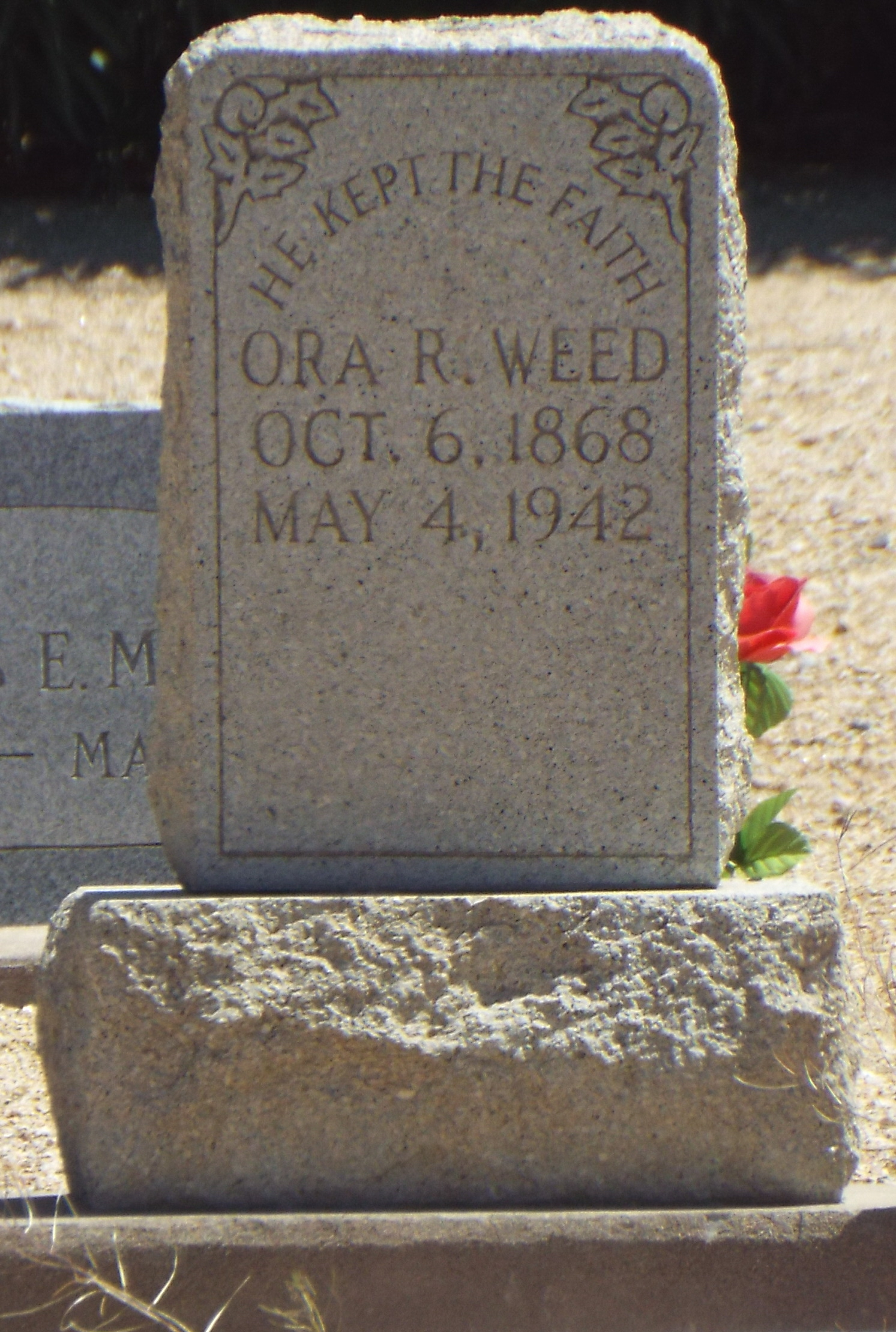
Grave of Ora Rush Weed.

Ora Rush Weed (October 6, 1868 – May 4, 1942) was a Methodist minister who founded Weedville, a small farming community in Arizona. Weedville's utilities are provided by the City of Peoria. The area is unincorporated which means that the land is not governed by Peoria, the local municipal corporation, instead it is administered by the county.

== Early years ==
Ora Rush Weed was born in Hardin, Ray County in Missouri. He was married to Phoebe Pomeroy Weed with whom he had 7 children. Weed became an ordinated Methodist minister. Soon, he moved with his family moved to Anderson County, Kansas. He was stern as a minister and believed that Methodism was too soft in the teachings of Christianity. Therefore, he moved to Gridley, Coffery, Kansas, and finally to the Territory of Arizona in 1911.

== Weedville, Arizona ==
In Arizona, together with his family and some followers, he homesteaded the area which is located within 71st and 75th Avenues, between Thunderbird Road and Acoma Drive. Rev. Weed established the Old Path Church, cemetery (1921) and boarding school, and a small religious community developed around these structures. Rev. Weed named his church and cemetery "Old Path" after a passage from the bible in the book if Jeremiah which states the following:

"Stand ye in the ways, and see, and ask for the old paths, where is the good way, and walk therein, and ye shall find rest for your souls."

Rev. Weed named the small religious community"Weedville" after himself. Weedville sustained itself with farming, sales from a small country store which he ran, and by making and selling brooms made from broomcorn which Rev. Weed established. The brooms were made by former prison inmates. Weed donated land and buildings to the Southwest Indian School.

=== Historic structures ===
Weedville, Arizona

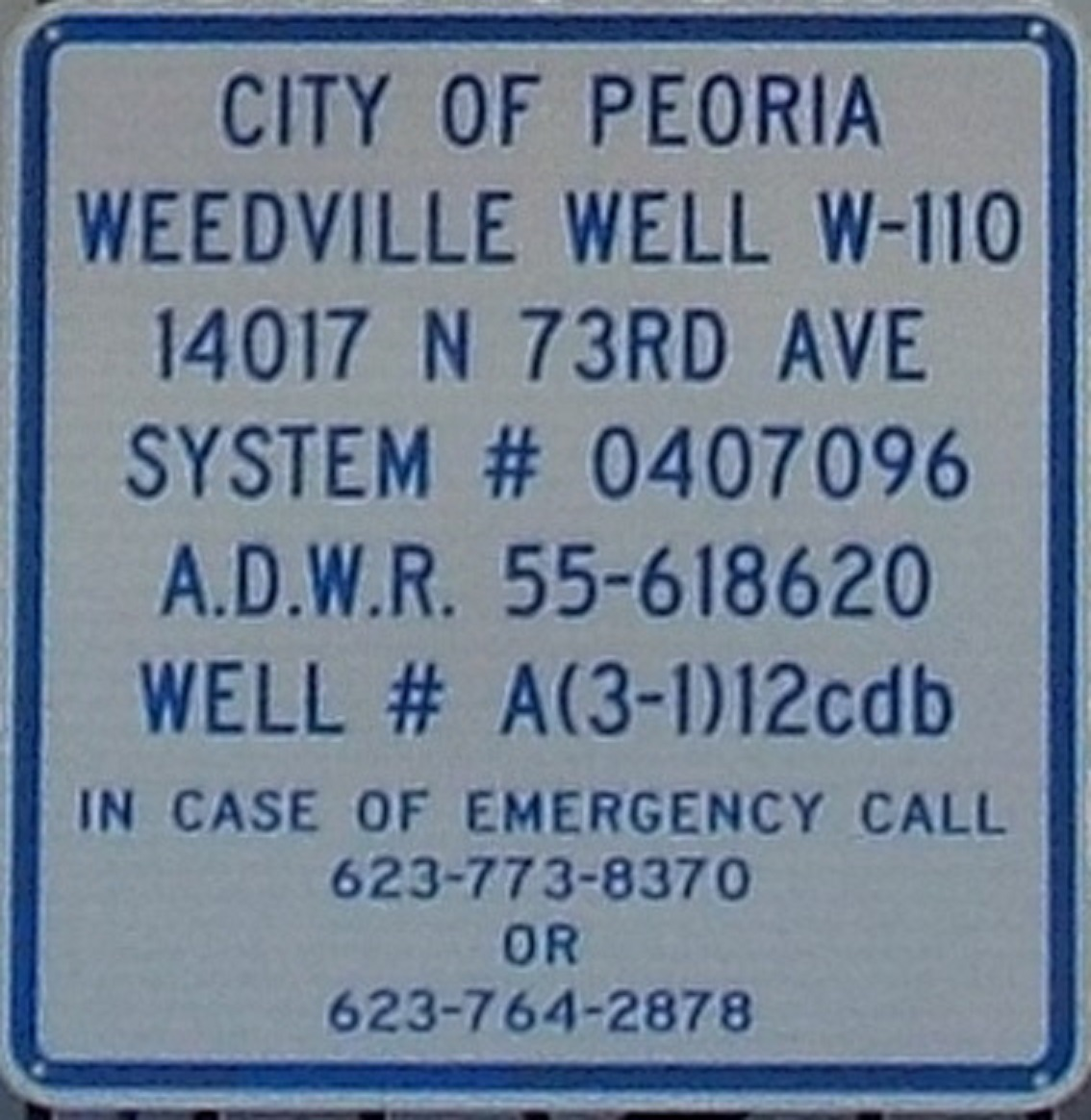
Weedville Water Well sign

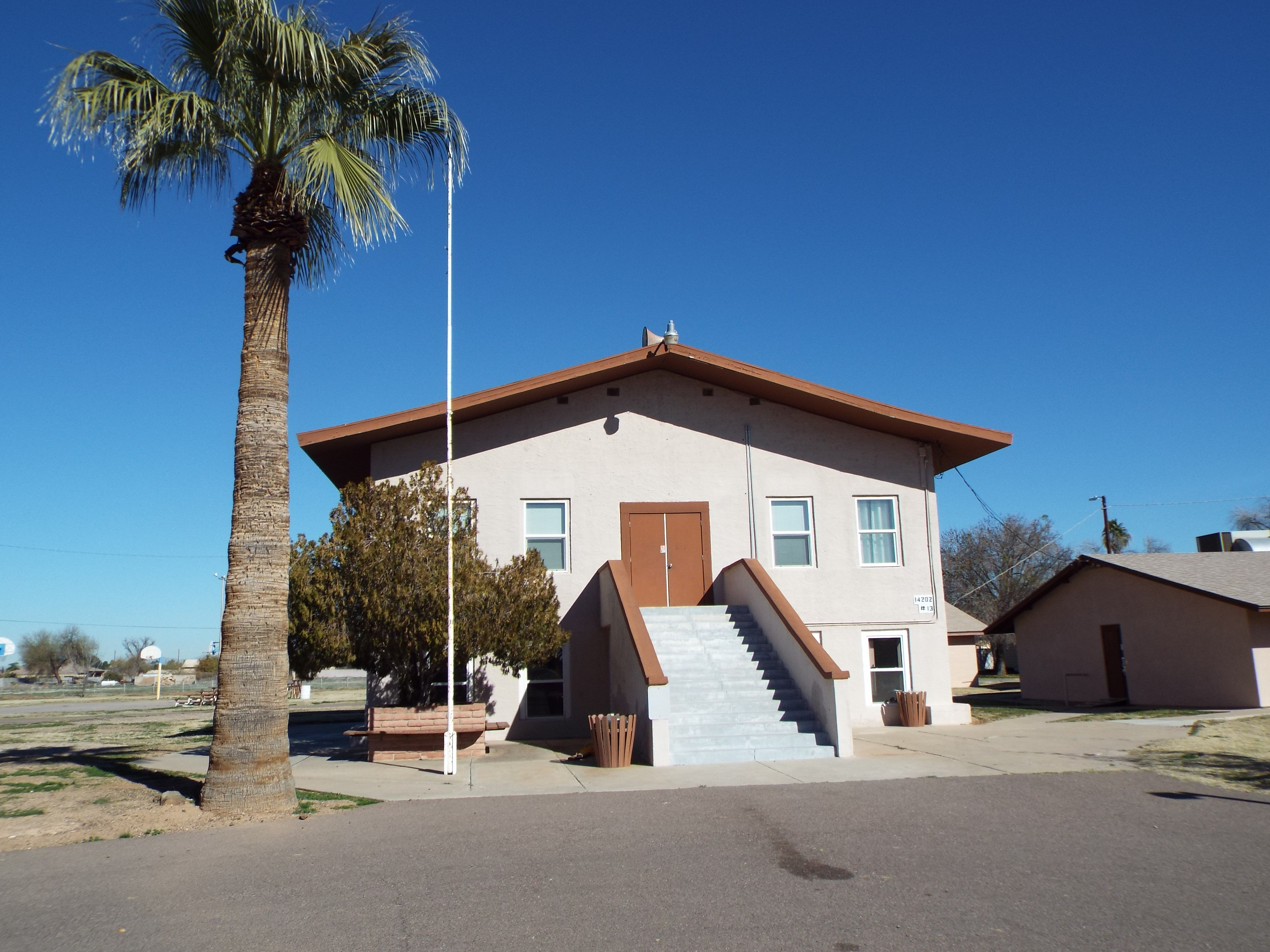
Old Path Church.

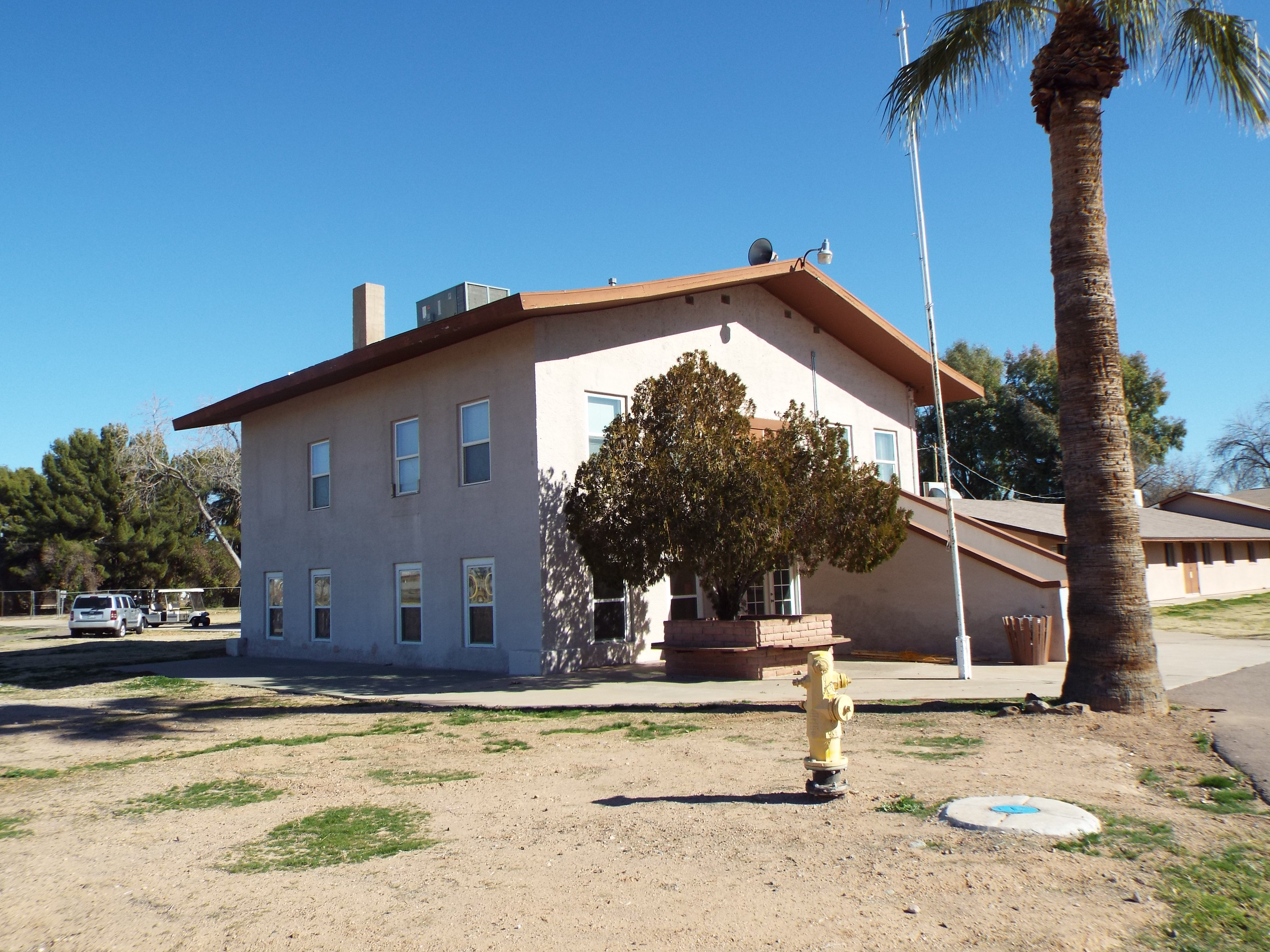
Side view of the Old Path Church.

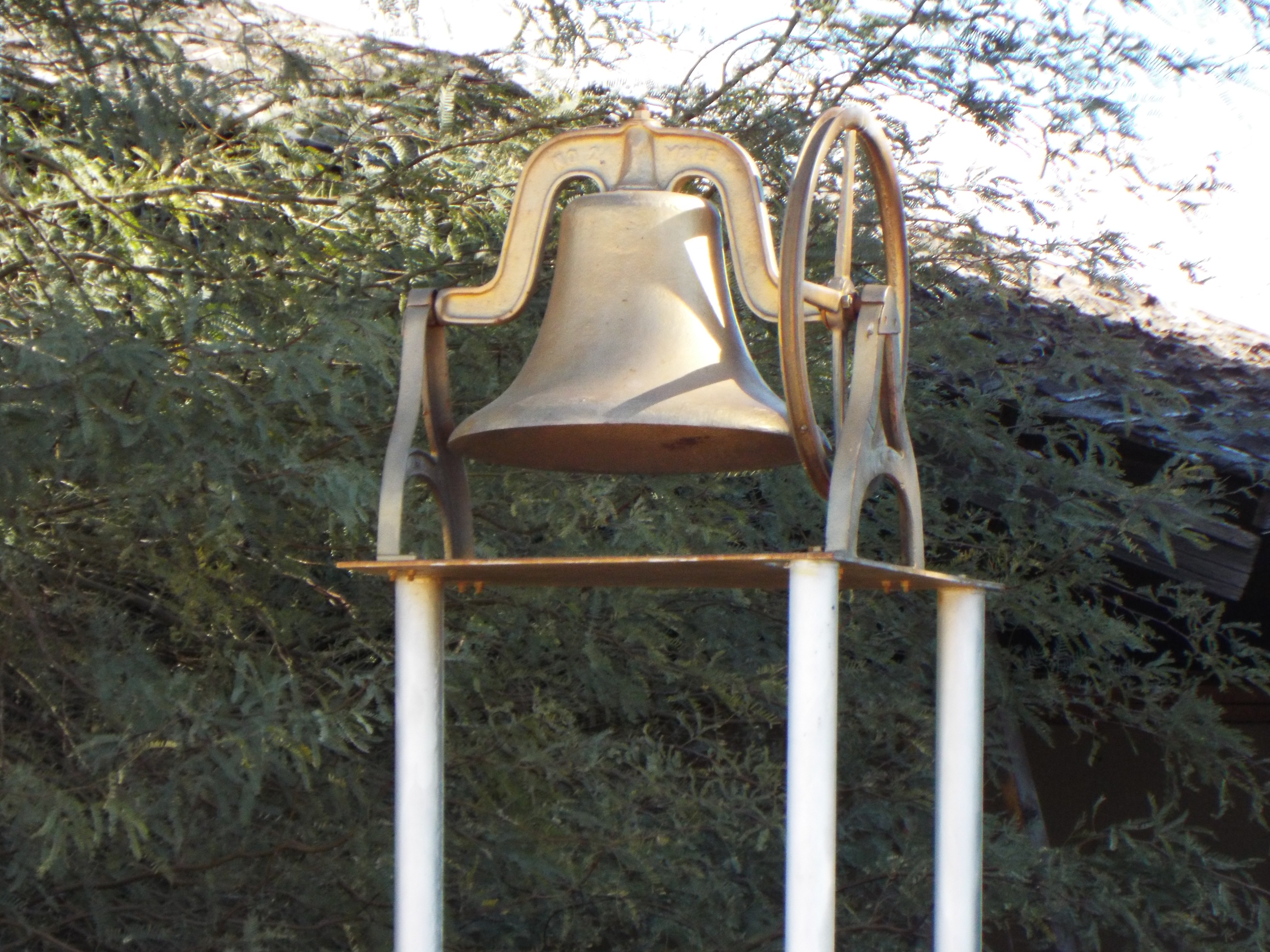
Original Old Path Church Bell.

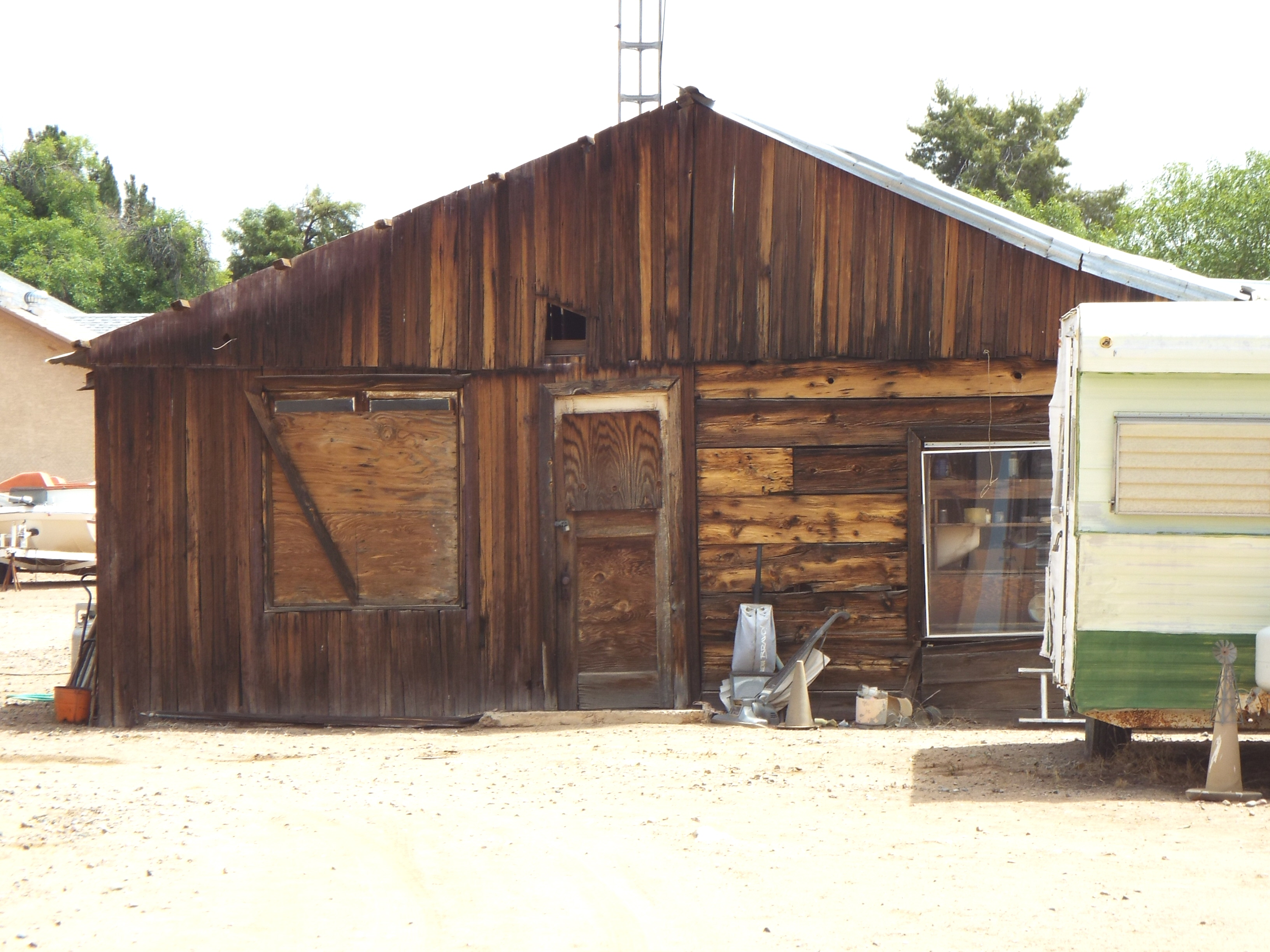
Old 1918 house in Weedville

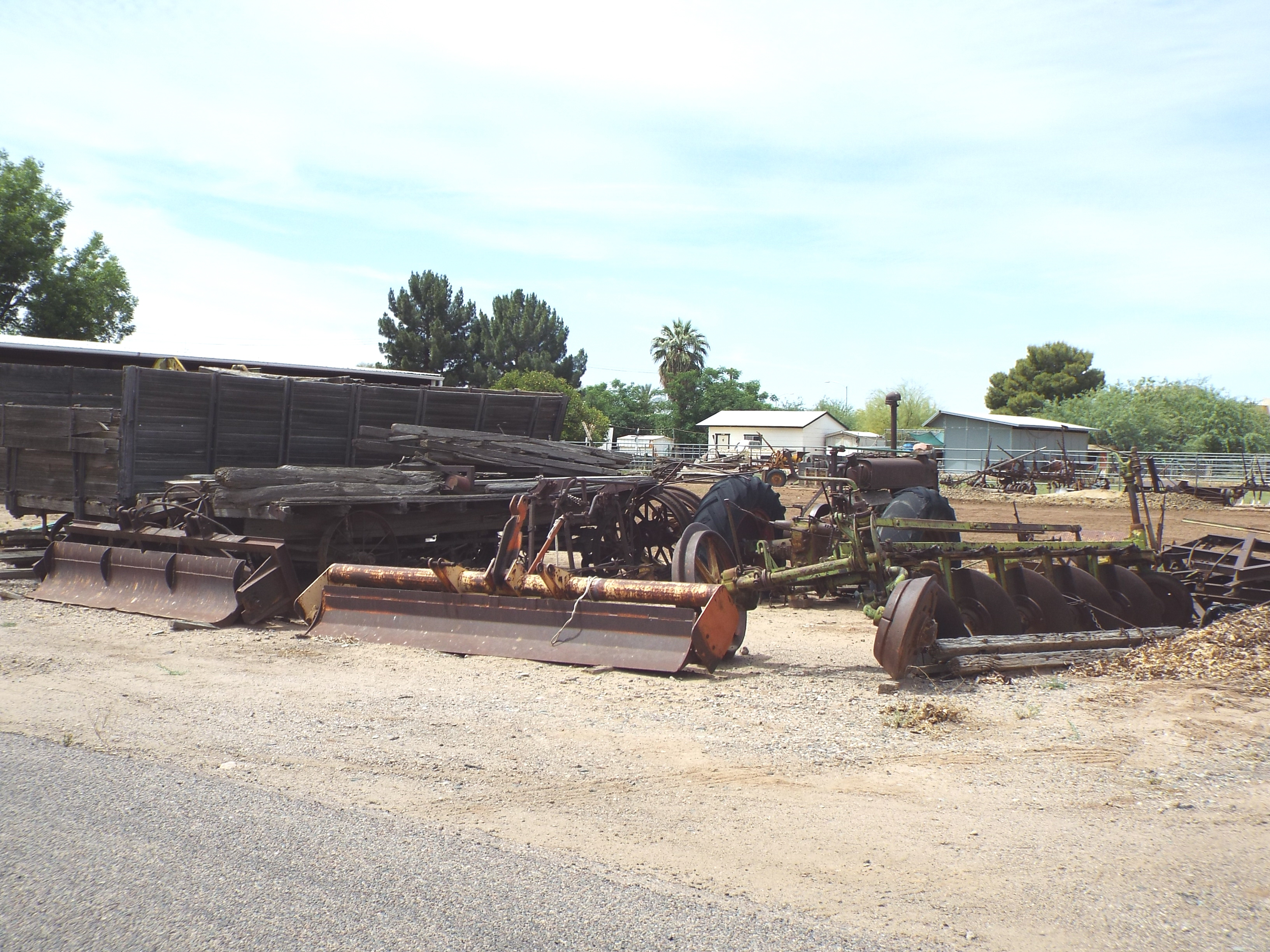
1920–1930 farm equipment used in Weedville.

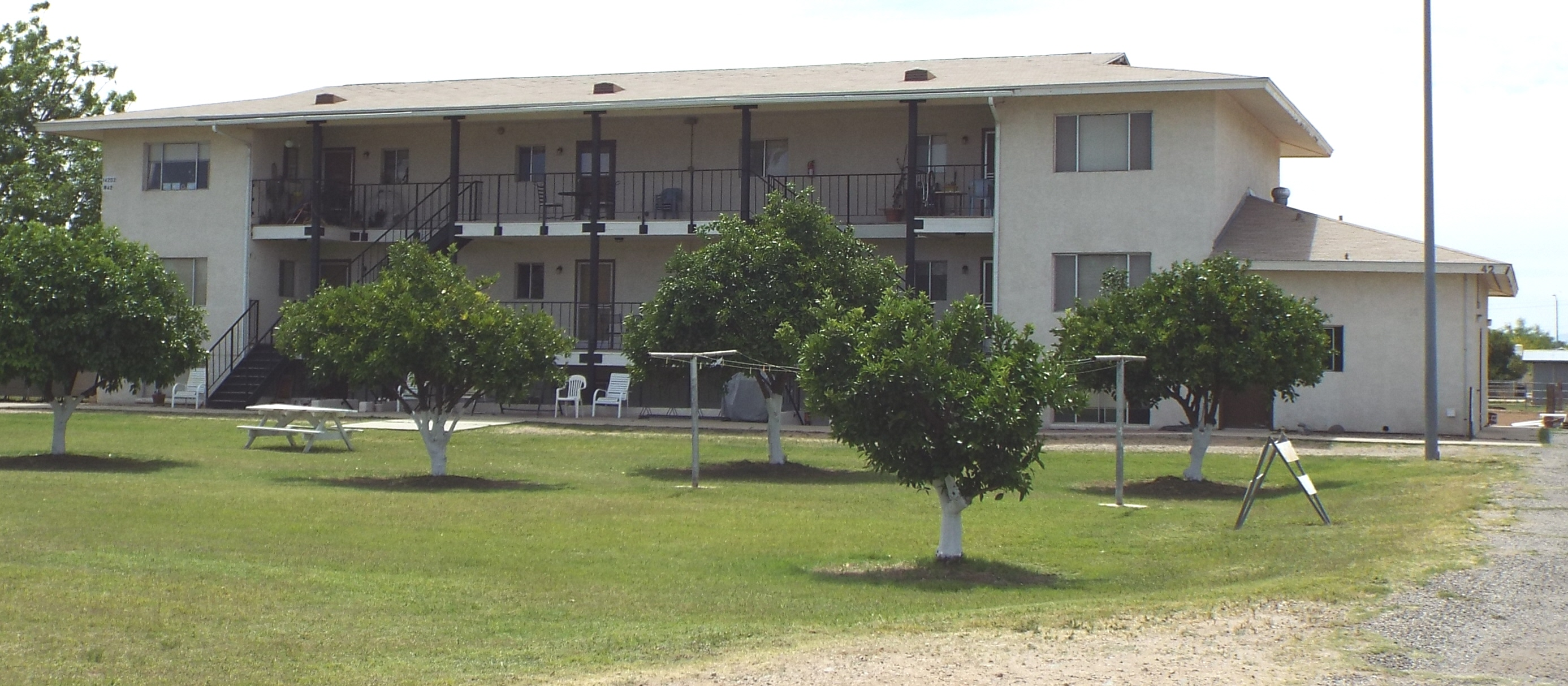
Early Weedville Boarding House.

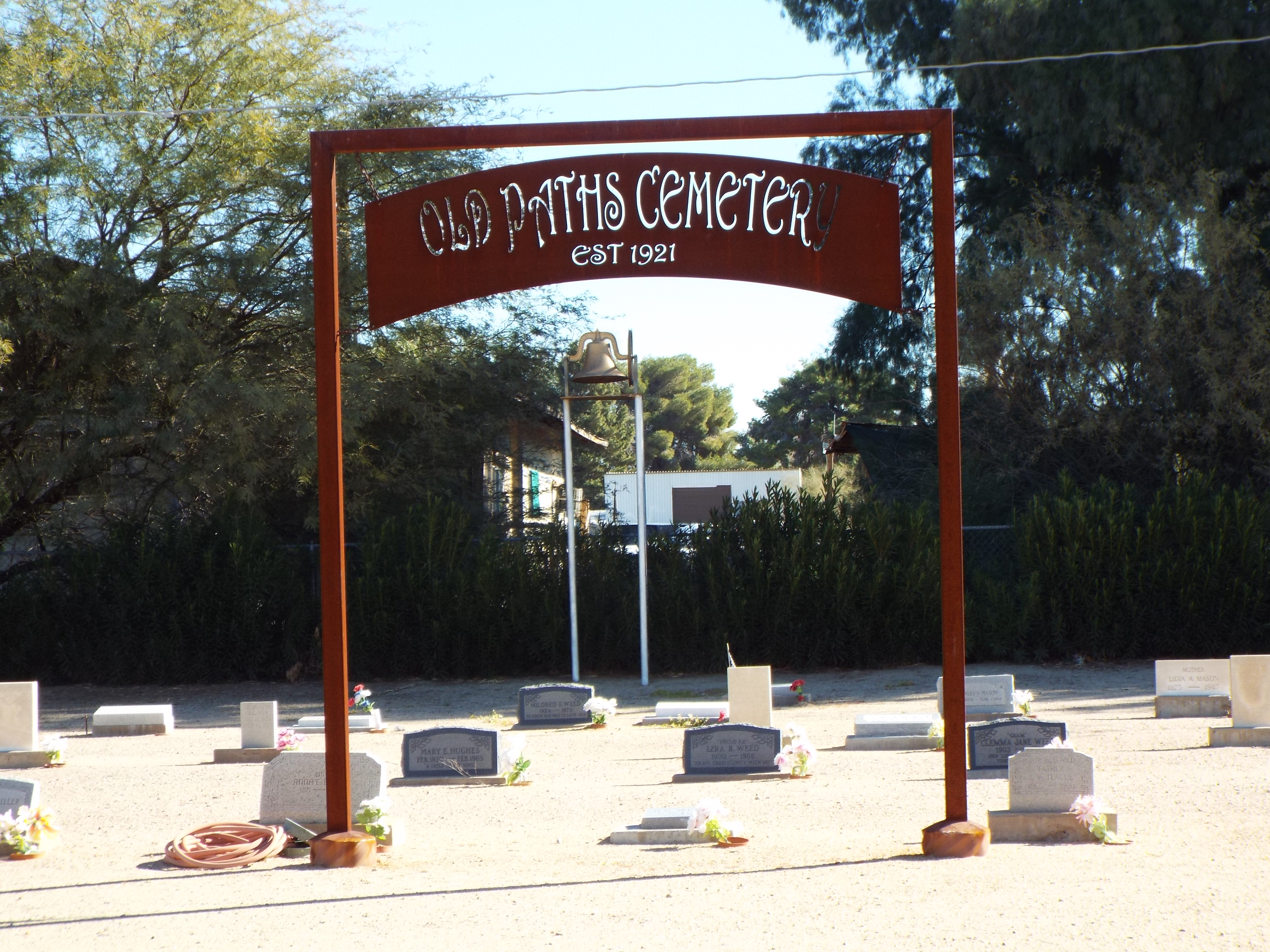
Old Paths Cemetery, established in 1921.

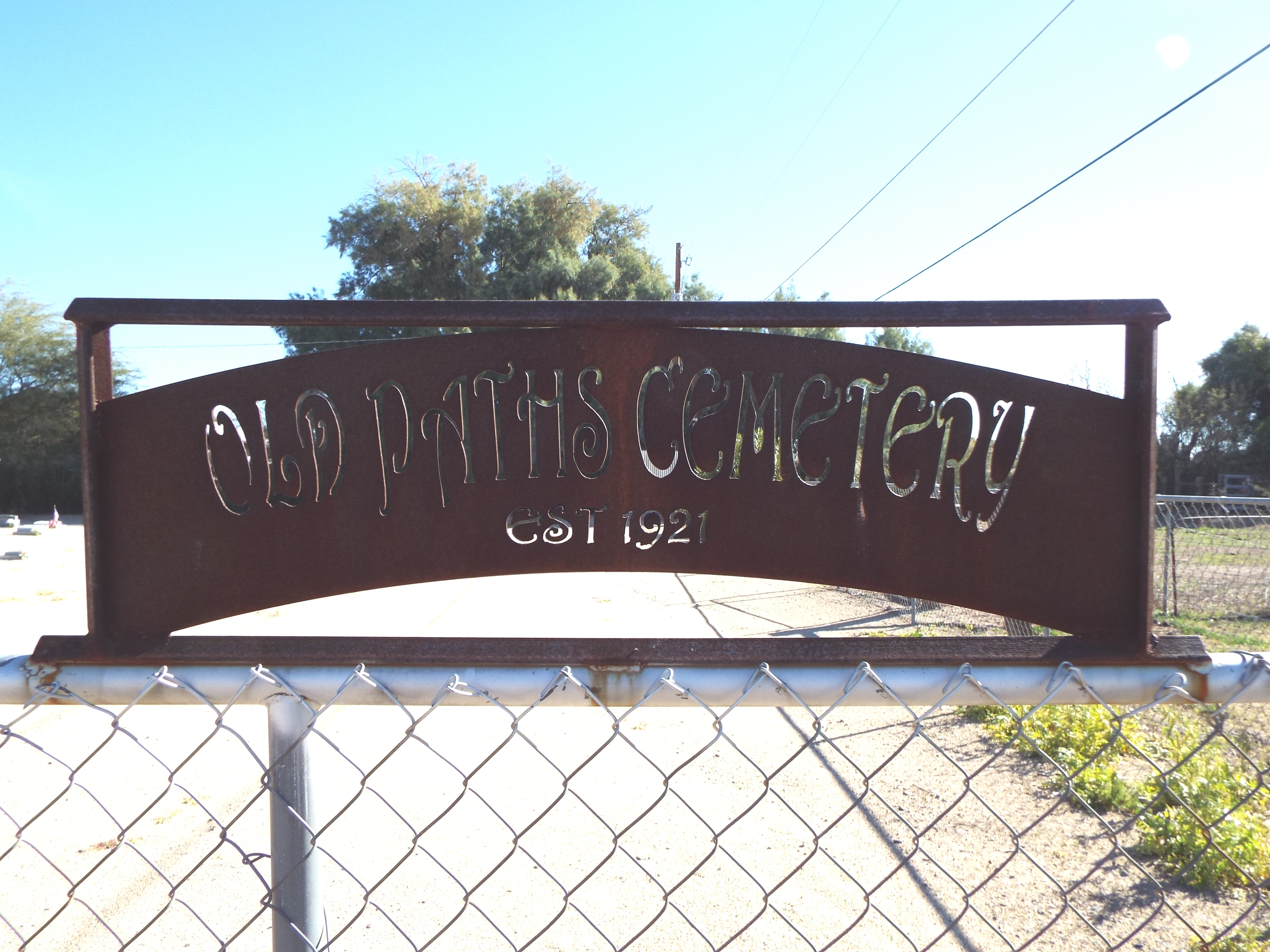
Entrance of the Old Paths Cemetery

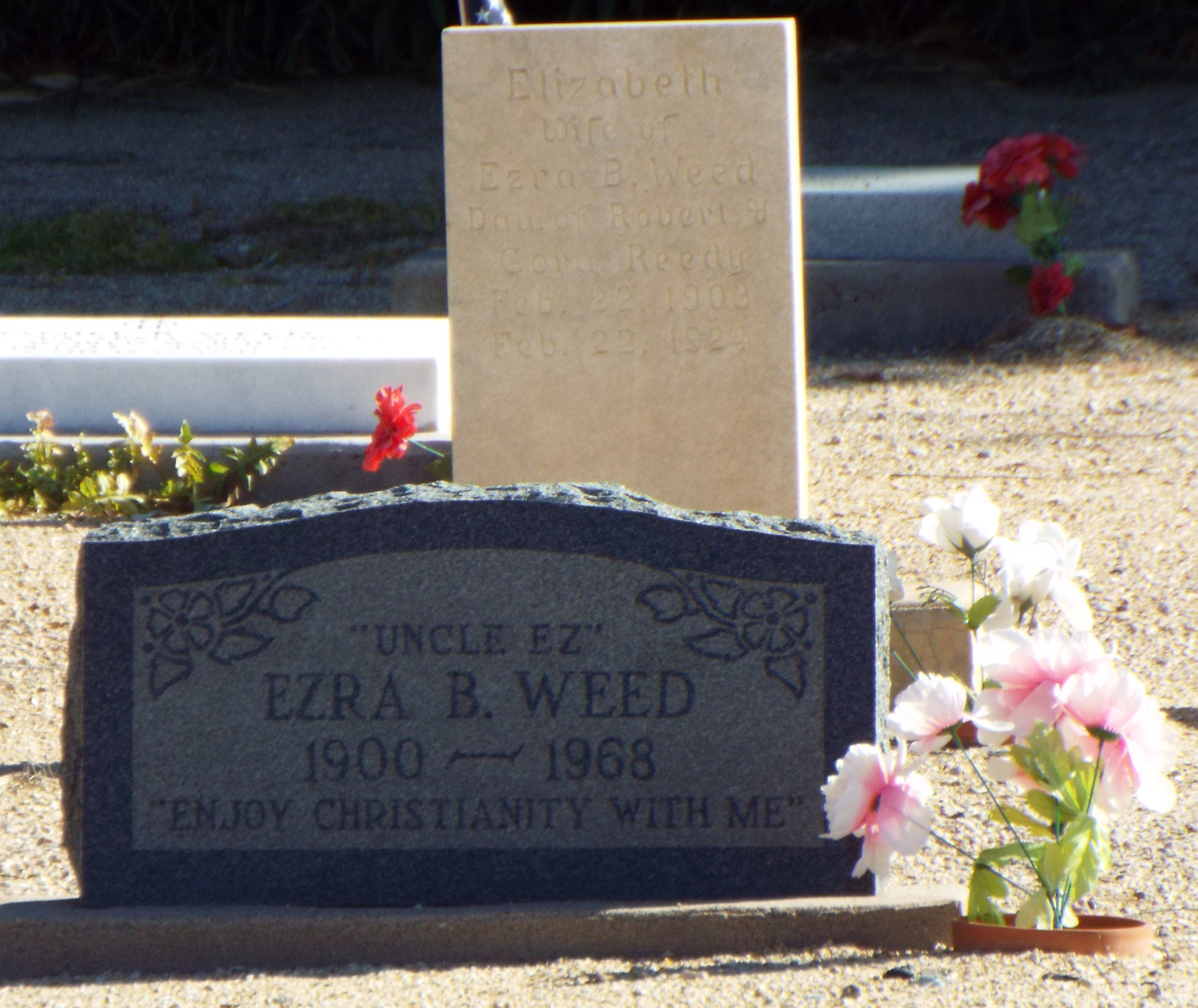
Graves of Erza Beeson Weed (1900–1968) (front) and his wife Elizabeth Weed (1903–1924). Erza was the son of the founders of Weedville, Ora Rush Weed and Phoebe Pomeroy Weed.

== Death ==
Weed died May 4, 1942, in Glendale, Arizona, and was buried in the Old Paths Cemetery. He was survived by his wife and six of his seven children. The 160 acres was sold off, with the majority of the land going to the Southwest Indian School and other religious organizations. The private cemetery still exists today and is maintained by Weed's descendants. The original Old Path Church bell hangs on a post located in the grounds of the cemetery. The Southwest Indian School has become the Southwest Indian Ministry Center. Much of Weedville remains an unincorporated county island.

== In popular culture ==
Arizona Republic writer Jim Cook had a chapter on Weedville in his 2002 book, "Arizona Liars Journal", published by Cowboy Miner Productions; ISBN 978-1931725033.

== See also ==
- Weedville, Arizona
- List of historic properties in Peoria, Arizona

=== Arizona pioneers ===
- Mansel Carter
- Bill Downing
- Henry Garfias
- Winston C. Hackett
- John C. Lincoln
- Paul W. Litchfield
- Joe Mayer
- William John Murphy
- Wing F. Ong
- Levi Ruggles
- Sedona Schnebly
- Michael Sullivan
- Trinidad Swilling
- Henry Wickenburg
