= Levi Ruggles =

Arizona pioneer (1824–1889)

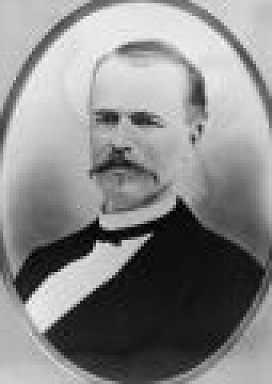
- Levi Ruggles (1880); Father of Florence, Arizona
- Born: 1824; Ohio
- Died: 1889 (aged 64–65); Florence, Arizona
- Occupations: Soldier, carpenter, schoolteacher, pioneer, and politician

Levi Ruggles (1824–1889) known as the "Father of Florence, Arizona" was an American soldier, carpenter, schoolteacher, pioneer, and politician who founded the town of Florence, Arizona.

== Early years ==
Ruggles was born in the state of Ohio. He was a carpenter by trade and also a school teacher. Upon the outbreak of the American Civil War, he joined the Ohio State Militia where he was commissioned with the rank of Colonel. The militia was absorbed by the Department of the Ohio, an administrative military district created by the United States War Department early in the American Civil War, and assigned to the regular Union Army during the conflict. He served in the militia until 1866. That same year he was appointed to serve as an Indian Agent in the United States Territory of Arizona. As an agent he had to interact with the Native-American tribes of the Pimas, Papago (an archaic term for Tohono O'odham people) and Maricopa on behalf of the U.S. government. Ruggles, who was married to Cynthia M. Tharp, held that office until 1869.

== Florence, Arizona ==
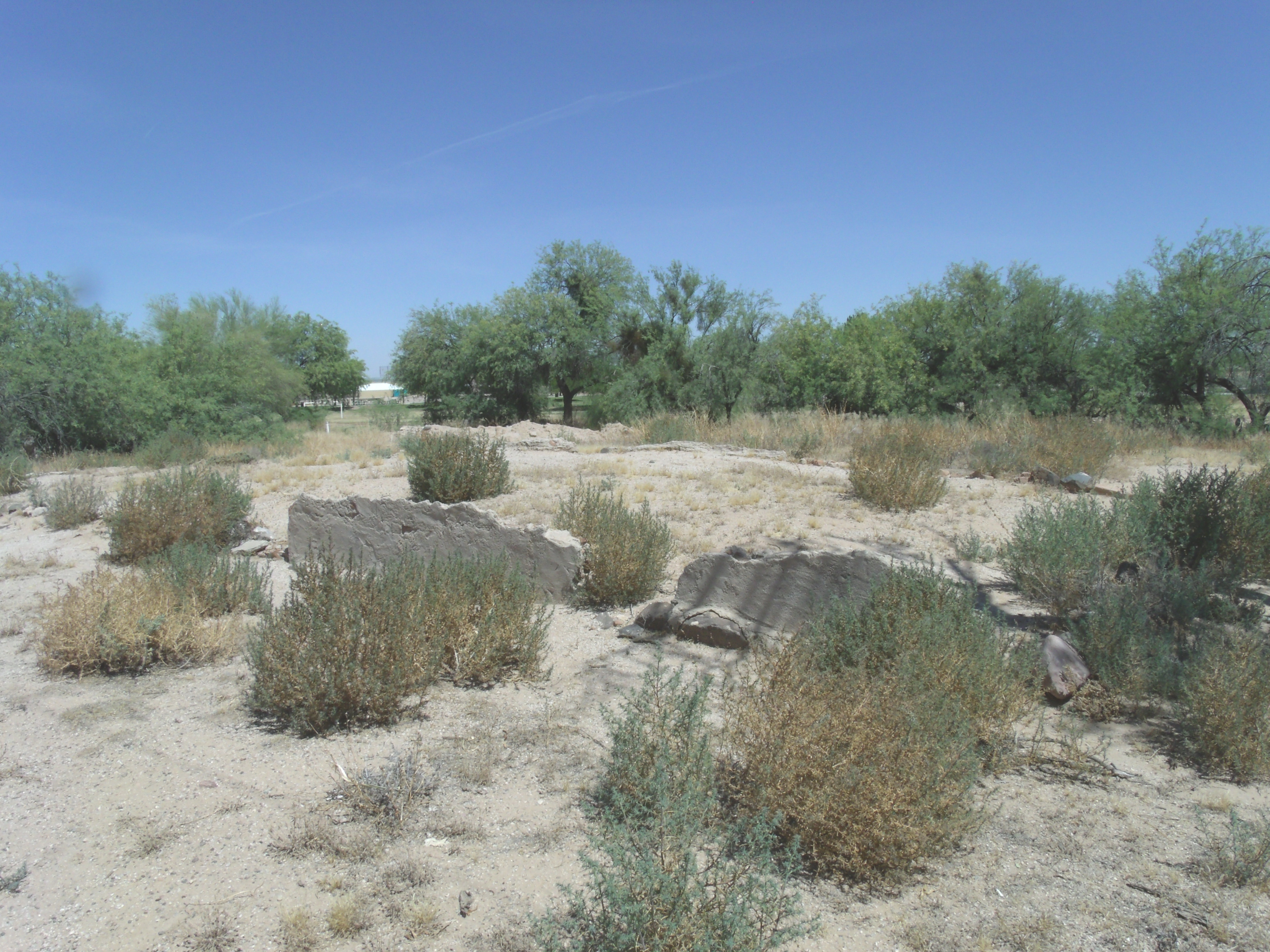
The Ruins of Levi Ruggles House.

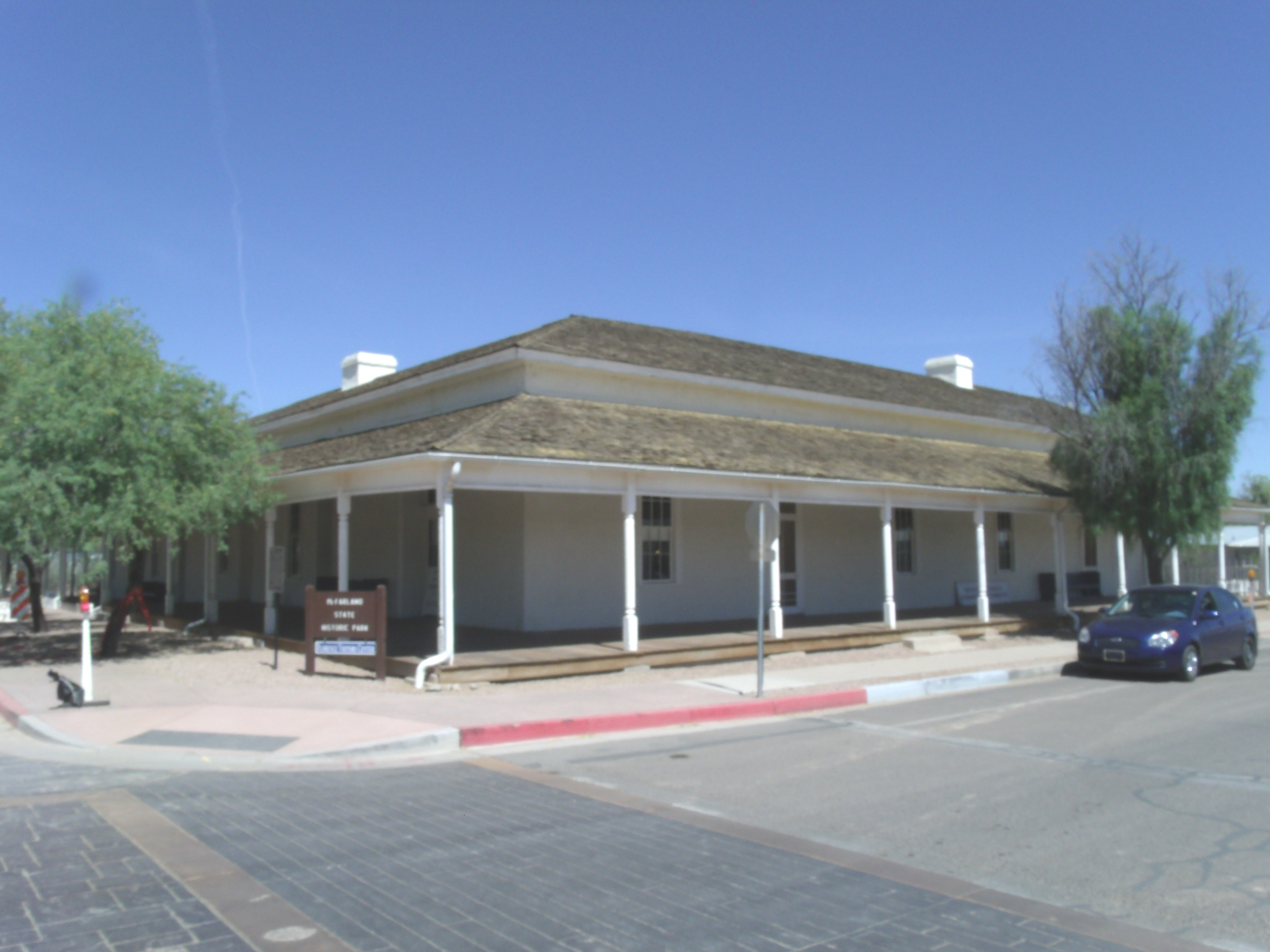
The First Pinal County Courthouse.

The area where Ruggles served had been once inhabited by the Hohokam people approximately 1,200 years ago. These early natives resided in close proximity to the Gila River, and had developed extensive canals and agricultural lands which yielded various crops. It is unknown what eventfully happened to the Hohokam people. During the early 1800s the region was under Mexican jurisdiction until the Gadsden Purchase of 1853, which placed all lands south of the Gila River under the authority of the United States Government.

Ruggles recognized the agricultural potential of the valley and found an easily fordable crossing on the Gila River. Ruggles brought land and surveyed a townsite which was laid out in 125 square foot blocks. He had a daughter named Florence, however it is commonly believed by historians that he named the town after Florence, Italy. Governor R.C. McCormick, helped secure a post office in August 1869. The first mail arrived in September, 1869, on horseback from the Blue River Station, twenty-five miles distant on the Overland Stage road. That same year (1869), he built his first family home and established a general store. The ruins of his first house are currently located in Ruggles St. between Quartz and Willow Streets.

Ruggles designed the plans for the First Pinal County Courthouse building that was constructed in 1878 of locally made adobe blocks. The wood for the building was brought from northern Arizona by wagon. The structure is located at W. 24 Ruggle St. It served as a courthouse. Since then, it has functioned as a hospital, health center, home for the elderly, and a museum. The structure is listed in the National Register of Historic Places on July 30, 1974, reference #74000461.

Ruggles held numerous public offices including both register and receiver of the U. S. Land Office, merchant, justice of the peace, school board trustee, Pinal County treasurer and representative to the Territorial Legislature three times.

Florence became the county seat in the newly formed Pinal County. Silver was discovered in 1875 in the nearby mountains which led to the creation of the famous Silver King Mine.

== Later years ==
Those who participated in the American Civil War, such as Ruggles, as members of the Union Army were awarded the Army Civil War Campaign Medal.

Ruggles died in Florence in 1889. According to the late A. W. Gressinger, president of the Pinal County Historical Society, Levi Ruggles was buried in the premises of his second house which was located at 9th St., between Willow Street and Central Ave. in 1889. The house itself was on the southwest corner of the lot, with much if the rest of the land occupied by fruit trees. By the time Ruggles died in his home in 1889, he had lost his wife, the former Cynthia Tharp, and three of their children years earlier. Their tombstones vanished and a developer built an apartment complex over their graves.

== See also ==
- List of historic properties in Florence, Arizona

=== Arizona pioneers ===
- Mansel Carter
- Bill Downing
- Henry Garfias
- Winston C. Hackett
- John C. Lincoln
- Paul W. Litchfield
- Joe Mayer
- William John Murphy
- Wing F. Ong
- Sedona Schnebly
- Michael Sullivan
- Trinidad Swilling
- Ora Rush Weed
- Henry Wickenburg
