= Weedville, Arizona =

- Populated place
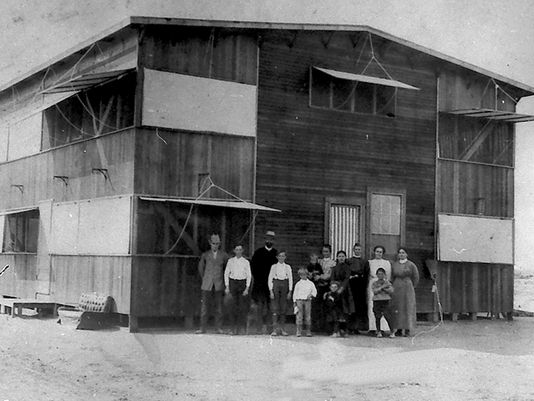
- Rev. Ora Rush Weed and his family in front of their home in 1912.

- Location within Arizona Location within the United States
- Coordinates: 33°36′50″N 112°12′56″W
- Country: United States
- State: Arizona
- County: Maricopa
- Elevation: 1,198 ft (365 m)
- Time zone: UTC-7 (Mountain (MST))
  - Summer (DST): UTC-7 (MST)
- ZIP codes: 85381
- Area code: 623
- FIPS code: 04-81410
- GNIS feature ID: 13436

Weedville is a populated place inside the city limits of Peoria in Maricopa County, Arizona, United States. (When it was founded in 1911, it was outside the city limits.) Weedville is in pockets of unincorporated land under the jurisdiction of Maricopa County. For all census and demographic purposes, Weedville is now considered part of Peoria, since it is inside the city limits.

== History ==
Reverend Ora Rush Weed (1868–1942) was a Methodist minister from Kansas. It is unknown why Weed decided to leave his hometown with his wife Phoebe and family. They moved and settled in Arizona. Some of the members of his Kansas ministry followed him and together they homesteaded the area north of Thunderbird Road and 75th Avenue, which was outside the city limits of Peoria at the time.

By 1916, Weed established the Path Church (now known as the "Old Path Church") and a boarding school. The name "Paths" comes from a Bible verse (Jeremiah 6:16): "Stand ye in the ways, and see, and ask for the old paths, where is the good way, and walk therein, and ye shall find rest for your souls." A small religious community flourished around the development of Weedville, which Weed had named after himself. By 1921, the community established a cemetery which was named the Old Paths Cemetery. Besides running a small general store, Weed ran a farm producing broom grass, and established a broom factory that used the grass. He employed many ex-convicts who had gained experience as broom makers in prison. As such the factory helped support the small community economically.

=== Later years ===
Weed donated land and buildings for the establishment of the Southwest Indian School. Today the site is home to the Southwest Indian School Ministries. The Old Path Church is still standing and is on the ministry grounds. Rev. Ora Weed died on May 4, 1942. He and many of his descendants are buried in the Old Paths Cemetery (which is on the Old Paths Cemetery Road). The Old Path Church's original bell is on the cemetery grounds, and is rung every Memorial Day.

== See also ==
- List of historic properties in Peoria, Arizona
- Indian Mesa
- Rio Vista Pond
