= Joe Mayer =

Arizona pioneer (1846–1909)

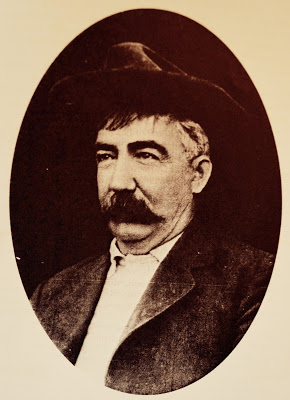
- Joe Mayer c. 1900; Founder of Mayer, Arizona
- Born: Joseph Hoffmayer; 1846; Olean, New York
- Died: November 27, 1909 (aged 62–63); Mayer, Arizona
- Occupations: Prospector, businessman

Joseph Mayer (1846 – November 27, 1909) was an American businessman, gold prospector and pioneer who founded the town of Mayer, Arizona.

== Early years ==
Mayer (birth name: Joseph Hoffmayer) was born in Olean, New York, to Alsatian immigrants. He didn't get along with his strict father and believed that his family favored his brother "Gus" over him. Therefore, he ran away from home when he was a teenager. He worked in various places including a cigar store and a cracker factory. After living on his own for several months he became interested in joining the troupe of a wild west circus which was performing in his town.

Mayer was assigned to do various chores in the circus and he visited many western towns. Eventually, he did what so many other American easterners were doing at the time and moved to the west coast in search of gold. He changed his surname to "Mayer" because he did not want his family in New York to find him and went to Silver City, New Mexico. There he met Sarah Belle Wilbur.

== Big Bug Stage Station ==
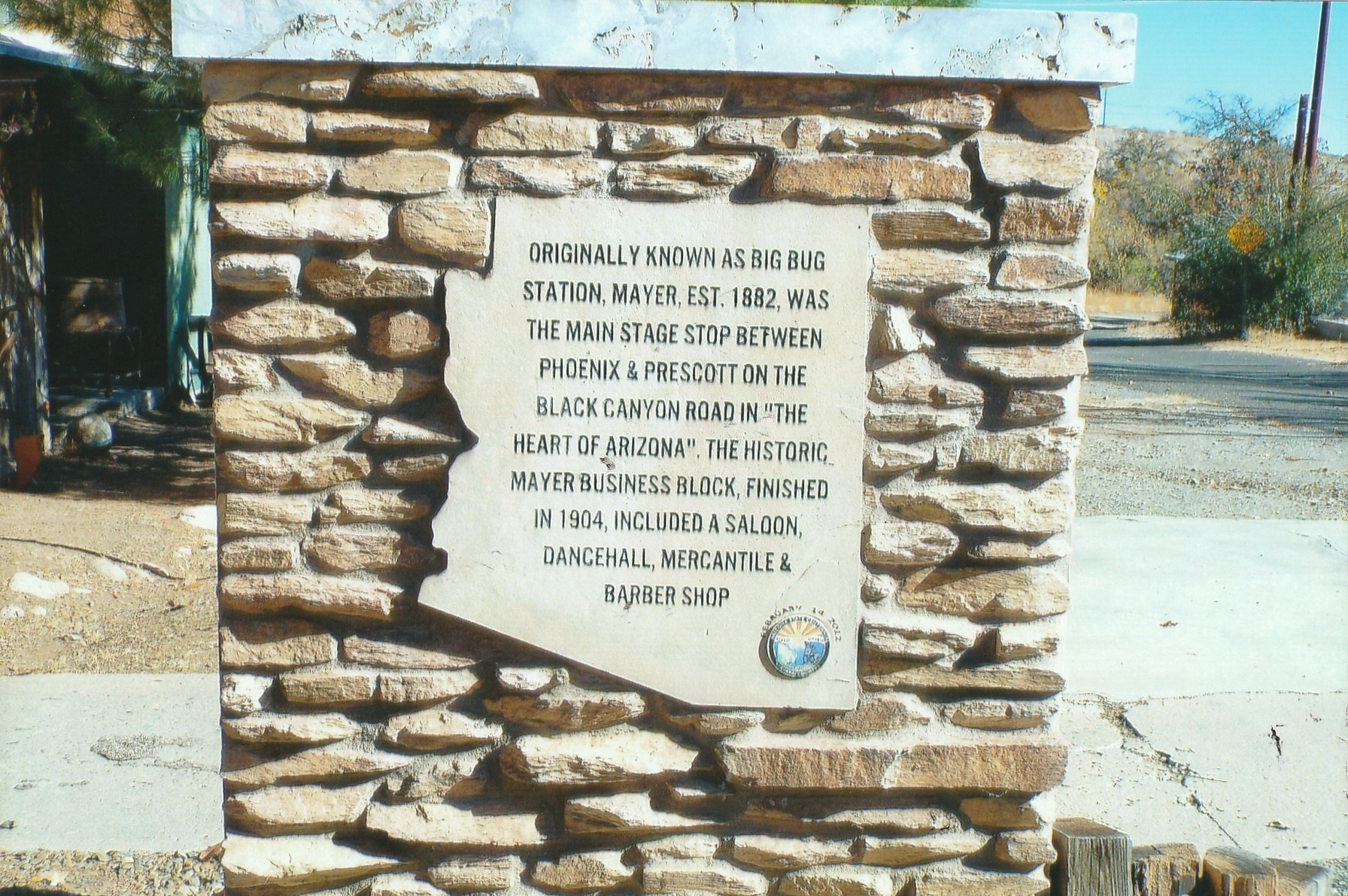
Marker which indicates the location of "Big Bug Station"

He and Sarah moved to Globe, Arizona, where they were married. Mayer and Sarah had four children. The children were named Mary Bell (1878–1964), Martha Gertrude (1881–1967), Wilbur Joseph (1882–1955) and Winifred Lucille (1892–1983). He spent a year mining in Globe; however by 1881, Mayer moved and began mining in the Tip Top Mine by Cottonwood Creek in Central Arizona. There he opened a restaurant and a store. Although he was successful as a businessman, his businesses were affected by the decline of the mine and the decline of the mining camp which depended on it. On one occasion he had to go to the city of Prescott and decided to take a short cut from the Black Canyon Trail. During his trip, he made a stop at the “Big Bug Stage Station”, a stage stop on the Black Canyon Stage Line. The station was located on the outskirts of Big Bug Creek. Mayer was impressed with the area and he purchased the “Big Bug Stage Station” for $1,200 in gold. Mayer then moved there with his wife Sarah and children.

== Mayer, Arizona ==
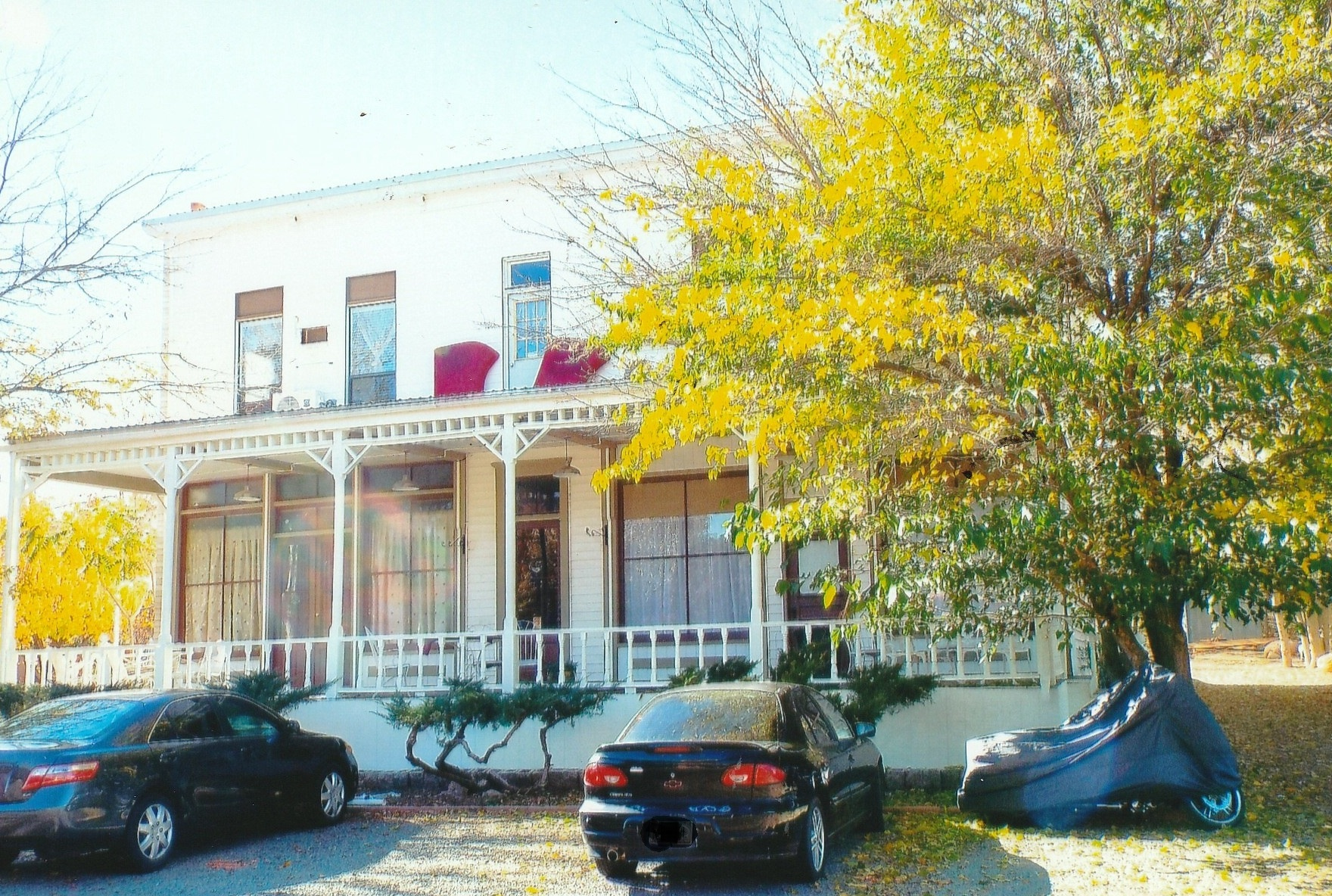
The Mayer Hotel.

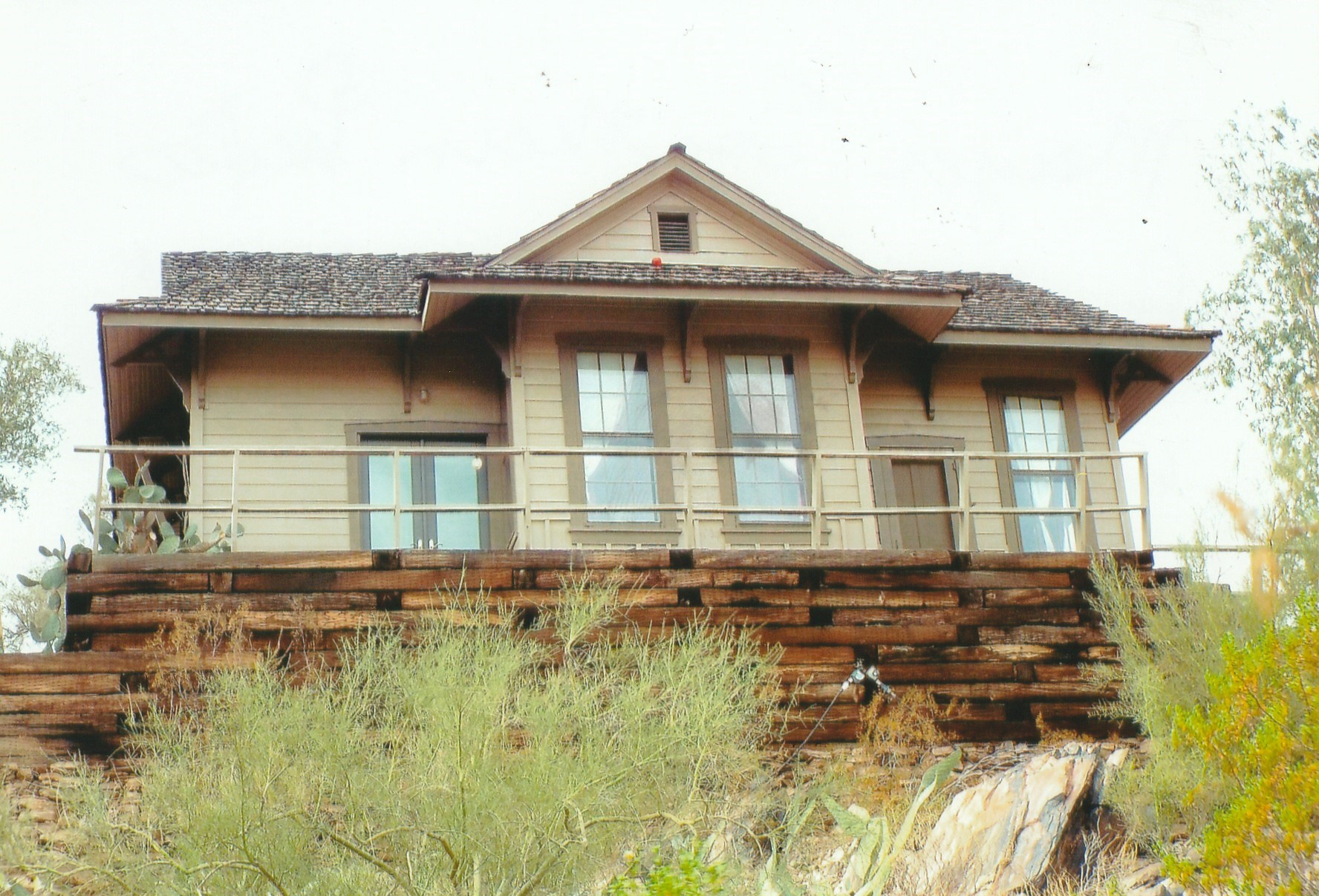
Prescott and Eastern Railroad Depot.

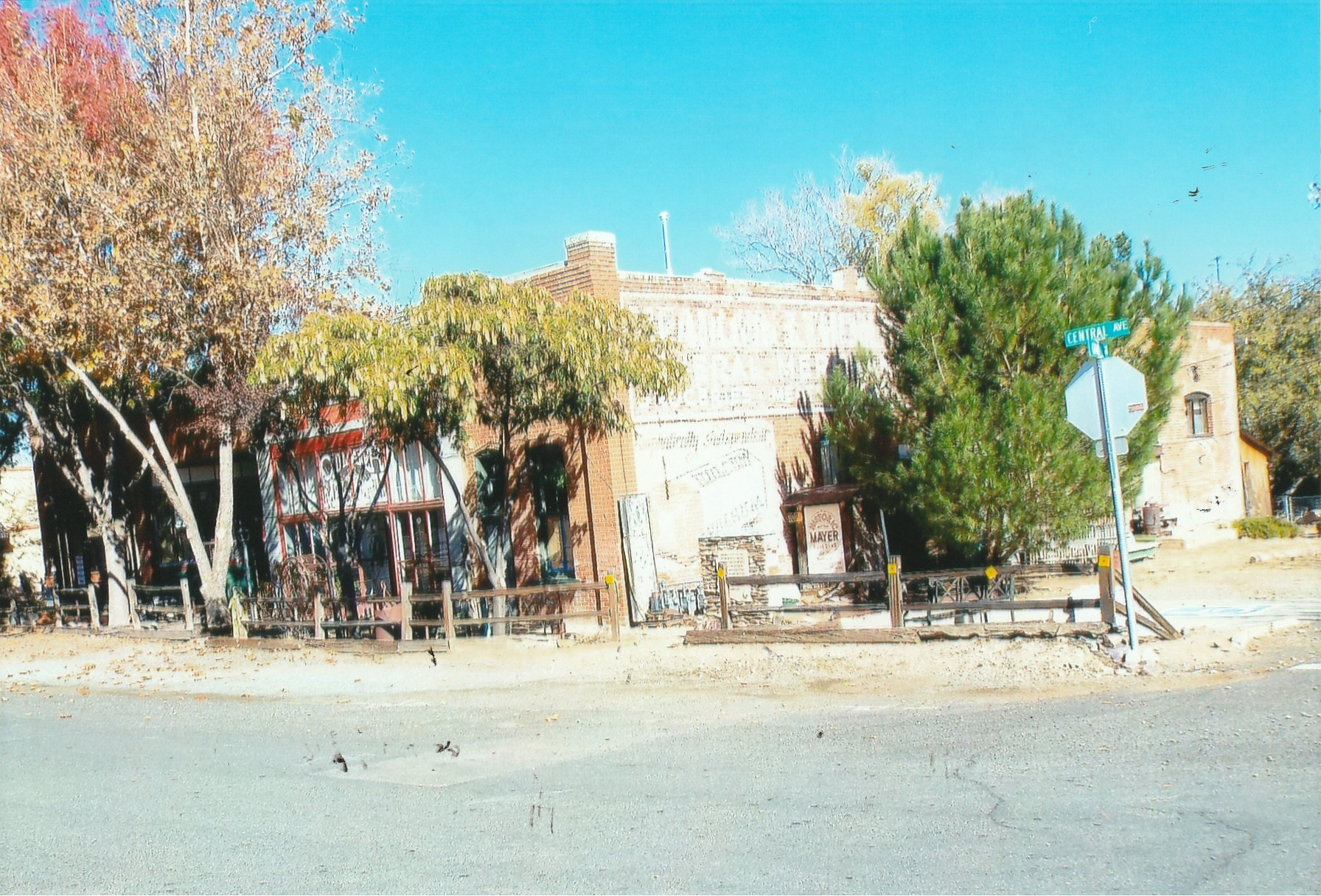
Historic Mayer Business Block

The Big Bug Stage Station was located in an area which was surrounded by the Bradshaw Mountains. The area was once inhabited by the Hohokams, a Native American tribe, and later by their descendants the Yavapai. This was before the arrival and settlement of the area by the people of Anglo European descent from the east coast of the United States.

The Black Canyon trail from Prescott to Phoenix was dangerous and many travelers were robbed of their belongings and sometimes murdered either by the Yavapai or the thieves who roamed the area. Miners would often stop at the Mayers' place to rest and to patronize the store which he had built. In 1882, Mayer officially founded the town which bears his name. In 1884, his wife Sarah became the first postmistress of the town and in 1889, one of the largest and finest deposits of onyx was discovered in the town of Mayer.

Tragedy struck the town of Mayer in 1890, when heavy rain caused a nearby dam called the "Walnut Dam" to fail causing a flood which wiped out all of the structures in the town. Mayer began to rebuild the town and in 1897, he built a two-story, 23-room hotel which he named the "Mayer Hotel".

Mayer also raised cattle and sheep. He realized that the establishment of a railroad line in the town would benefit his ranch and the mine near it. He offered the "right of way" to the Southern Pacific Railroad with the condition that they establish a rail line that ran through the town. The railroad company agreed and began servicing the town of Mayer in 1898. (Note: The historic depot was built in 1898 in Mayer, Arizona. The building was purchased by a private citizen who had it hauled to a hill in Phoenix. The owner turned it into part of his home. It is located at 1711 N. 18th Place.) Mayer established a brickyard and in 1902, he used his bricks to build a business block, now known as the "Mayer Business Block", across the street from the Mayer Hotel. The block included a saloon with a dance floor, a barber and bath shop, a mercantile shop and a general store.

== Later years ==
Mayer provided the money needed to finance the building of two schools. He had one school built within the town and the second one two miles out from the town for the miners' children.

Not all of his ventures were successful. One of his failures was the "Indian Souvenir Toothpick Company". He planned to produce toothpicks from cacti with a new chemical process. However, the cost of removing barbed skin of cactus needles, by the patented chemical process, to make them suitable for toothpicks was too high. Finally, the toothpick company closed because it could not compete with the companies that made standard wooden toothpicks.

Mayer learned from a family friend that his mother was in ill-health and that she was dying. He was told by the friend that she wanted to see him before she died. He was also informed that his father and his older brother Gus were dead. Mayer was able to visit his mother and brother Anthony in New York shortly before she died.

On November 28, 1909, Mayer heard a noise outside his house and, believing that there was an animal or thief, he took his rifle and ran outside. He tripped as he ran and accidentally shot himself. The wounds which he received were fatal and he died soon after. His funeral was held in the Sacred Heart Church of Prescott. Mayer was buried in Mountain View Cemetery located at 1051 Willow Creek Rd. in Prescott.

== See also ==
- List of historic properties in Mayer, Arizona
- Paul W. Litchfield

=== Arizona pioneers ===
- Mansel Carter
- Bill Downing
- Henry Garfias
- Winston C. Hackett
- John C. Lincoln
- William John Murphy
- Wing F. Ong
- Levi Ruggles
- Sedona Schnebly
- Michael Sullivan
- Trinidad Swilling
- Ora Rush Weed
- Henry Wickenburg
