= Sedona Schnebly =

Arizona pioneer (1877–1950)

- Statue of Sedona Schnebly in the Sedona Public Library
- Born: Sedona Arabella Miller; February 24, 1877; Gorin, Missouri, U.S.
- Died: November 13, 1950 (aged 73); Sedona, Arizona, U.S.
- Resting place: Cooks Cedar Glade Cemetery in Sedona, Arizona
- Other name: Dona
- Known for: Namesake of the Town of Sedona, Arizona
- Spouse: Theodore Carlton Schnebly

Sedona Schnebly (born Sedona Arabella Miller; February 24, 1877 – November 13, 1950) was an early pioneer in the Oak Creek area of Arizona. She was the namesake of the town of Sedona, Arizona. She helped in the establishment of the family farm and general store in the town. She also served as the town's bible school teacher. Sedona saved funds to build the Wayside Chapel. Among her legacy is a sculpture of a statue in her likeness by the Sedona Red Rocks Arts Council honoring her memory.

== Early years ==
Sedona was born in the town of Gorin, Missouri, to Philip and Amanda Miller. Her mother made up the name of Sedona; however, the child was known as "Dona", a name which those close to her called her throughout her life.

She attended the Gorin Academy where she received a formal education including languages and learned to play the piano. After she graduated Sedona taught briefly. When she was 20 years old she met Theodore Carleton (T.C.) Schnebly, an enterprising young man who owned a hardware store in town with his brothers. They fell in love, however her parents objected to their relationship for religious reasons. The Millers were Methodist and Theodore Carleton Schnebly was a Presbyterian.

== Arizona ==
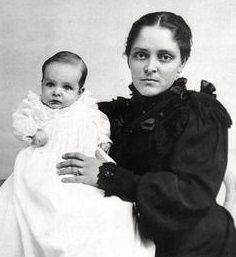
Sedona Schnebly (the city's namesake) and her son Ellsworth (Tad) Miller Schnebly in a christening gown in 1898

T.C. Schnebly's brother, Ellsworth, had previously moved to the Oak Creek region of Arizona for health reasons upon the recommendation of his medical doctor. Ellsworth wrote to the Schneblys encouraging them to move to Arizona which had plenty of land with deep grass, crystal clear air and lots of game and fish. Convinced by Ellsworth, the Schneblys told Sedona's parents about their plans of moving to the West (Arizona). Sedona's parents did not approve of their plans and this eventually caused a rift in the families relations.

T.C. arrived in Oak Creek, which was called the red rock country, before the rest of the family. Together with other pioneer families, he blasted out irrigation routes and moved the water through ditches, flumes and pipelines. He purchased 80 acres from Frank Owenby, who had homesteaded the land, with an orchard in the area known as Camp Garden, along Oak Creek. He began to haul his produce to the City of Flagstaff where he sold them and then he would return to his farm in Oak Creek with goods from that city.

T.C. sent for his wife Sedona and their two children. She boarded a train with her children and belongings that was headed to the mining town of Jerome. T.C. was waiting in Jerome for his family to arrive and when they did he put his family and family possessions on a wagon and headed towards Oak Creek. They all arrived to their new home on October 12, 1901. They built a two-story house and established a small store where they sold their goods to the local residents. The Schneblys hired road crews to build what is now known as Schnebly Hill Road. This road provided a much better way to take their crops to Flagstaff.

== Naming of Sedona ==
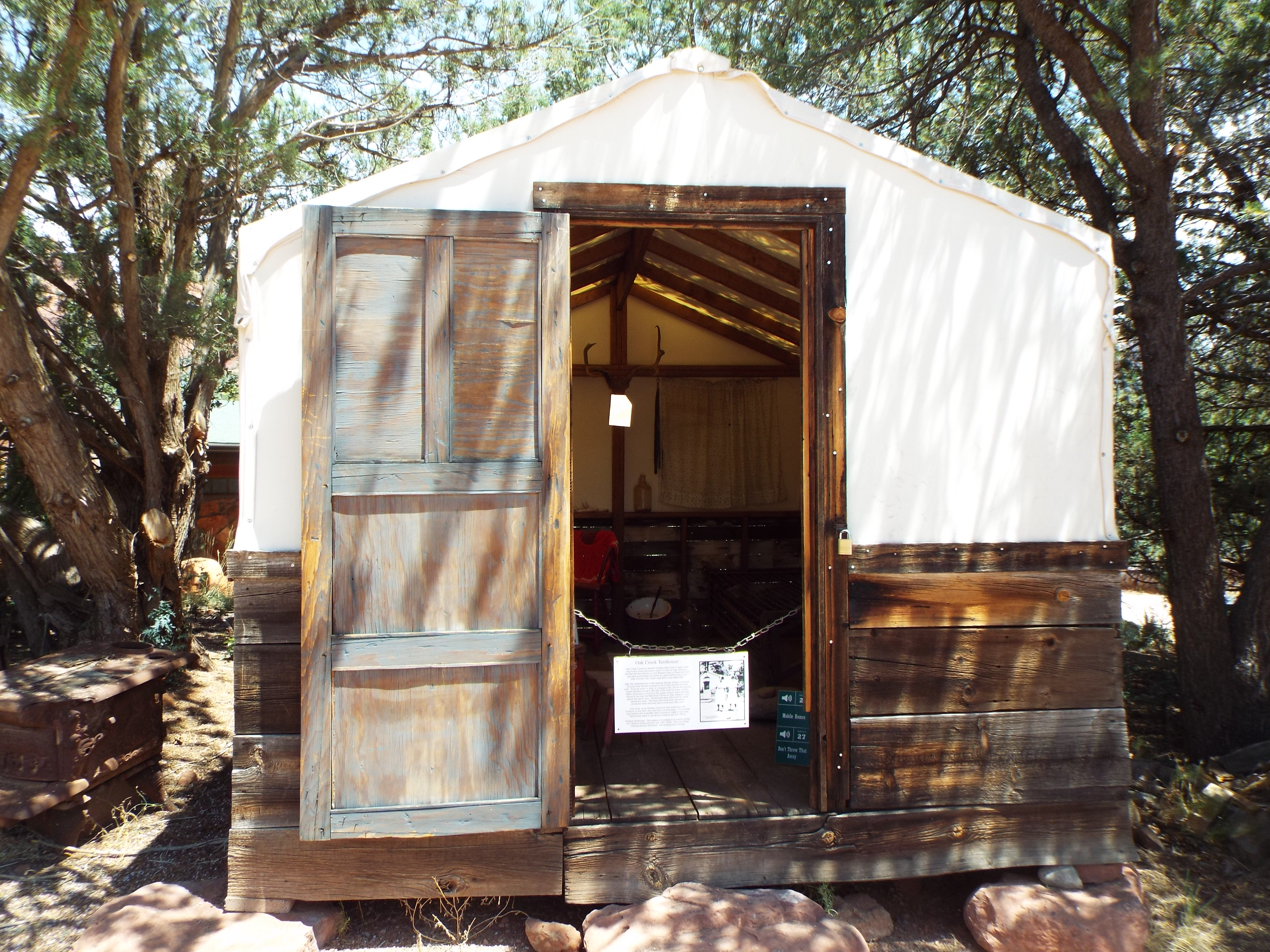
Oak Creek Tenthouse

Their large house served as a residence for visitors. The guests never paid more than $1 a day for room and board. Tubercular guests were considered contagious and so were placed in tenthouses on the property. Not only did Sedona cook for everyone and tend to her children, but she helped on the farm, made soap, and canned fruits and vegetables.

The Schneblys believed that the fast-growing community needed a post office. T.C. wanted to be the area's first postmaster and so wrote to the Postmaster General in Washington, D.C., suggesting "Oak Creek Crossing" and "Schnebly Station" as town names. Both were rejected as too long. Ellsworth, Theodore's brother, suggested that he submit "Sedona" as the name. On June 26, 1902, that name was approved.

== Schnebly family tragedy ==
On June 12, 1905, Sedona's five-year-old daughter Pearl was killed when she became tangled in the reins on her pony and she was trampled to death. They buried their daughter in their front yard and Sedona became very depressed. The Schneblys returned to Missouri in an effort to improve Sedona's health.

Sedona's husband eventually decided that he would like to return to farming and the family moved to Boyero, Colorado. Their economic situation was a difficult one and T.C.'s health worsened. His medical doctor recommended that he should return to Arizona for health reasons and they did.

== Return to Sedona ==
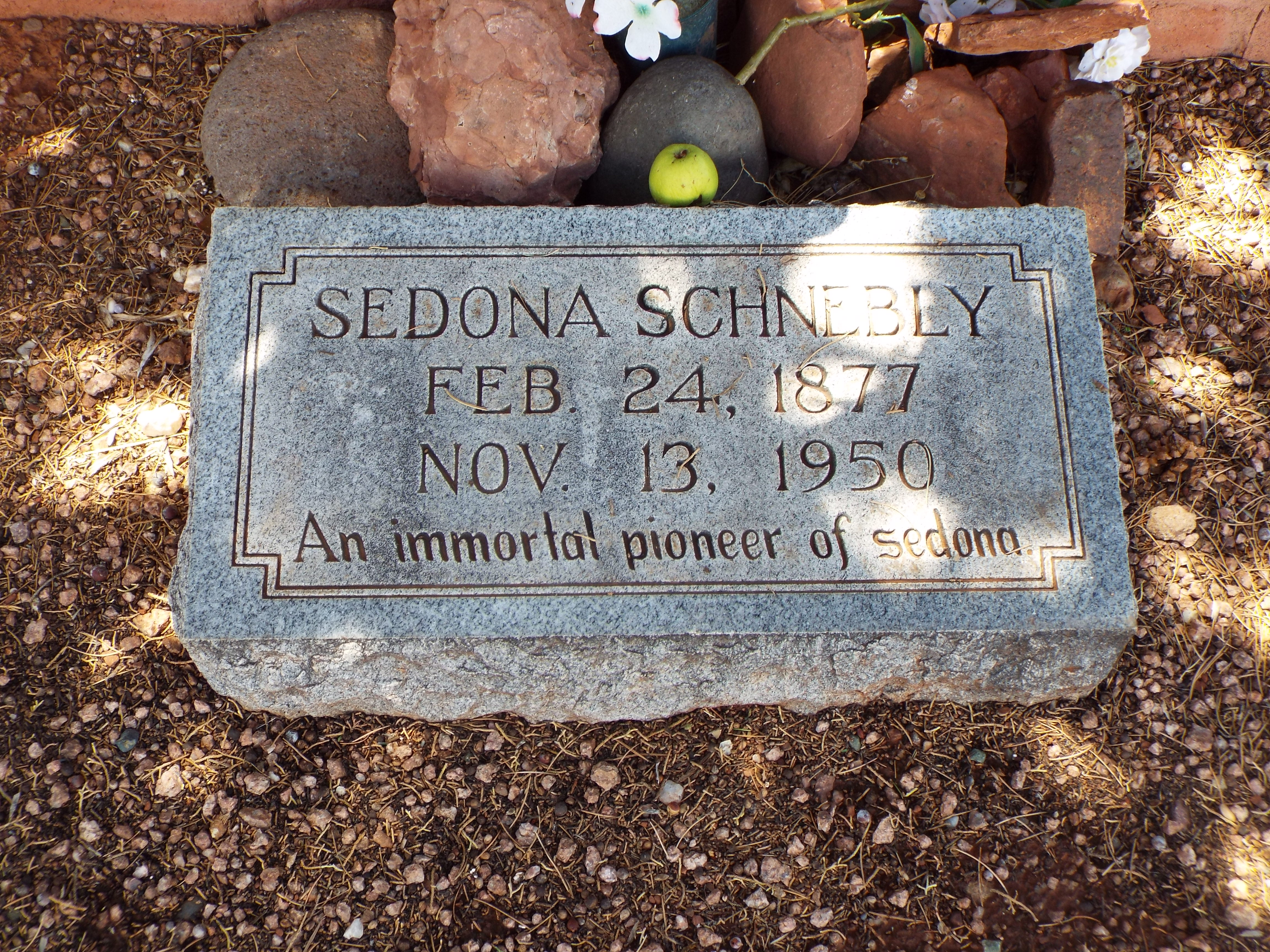
Grave-site of Sedona Schnebly (1877–1950)

In 1930, they moved to Phoenix and that same year returned to Sedona. There was nothing left of their homestead and they had no other choice than to rent a small one-room house on Jordan Road. T.C. helped Walter Jordan around the orchards and property. Sedona helped Ruth with the cleaning and cooking and care of the Jordans' three children. She also washed and ironed Civilian Conservation Corps boys' uniforms for 10 cents per shirt.

Sedona Schnebly taught Bible at the American Sunday School and saved money to fund the building of a religious chapel. In 1950, the Wayside Chapel just off Highway 89A was completed and dedicated to Sedona Schnebly. Sedona was suffering from cancer and on November 13, 1950, she died. Her husband T.C. outlived her by almost four years, dying March 13, 1954. Both Sedona and T.C. are buried in Cooks Cedar Glade Cemetery off Airport Road. The remains of their daughter Pearl were also moved to Cooks Cedar Glade Cemetery.

== Legacy ==
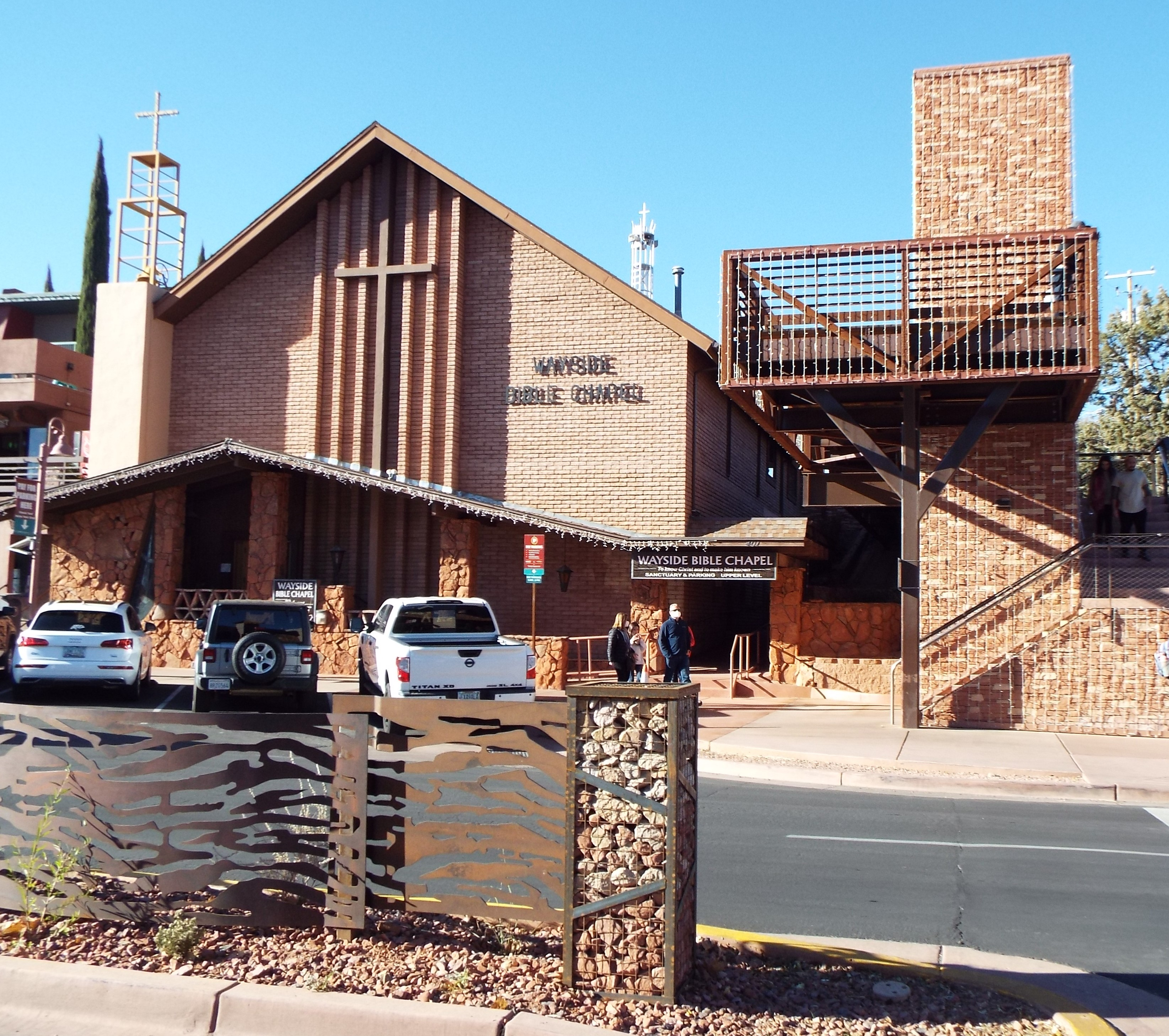
Wayside Chapel

On February 14, 2012, the Sedona Schnebly Memorial bell was rung at 2:14 during the Arizona Centennial celebration of Statehood in front of the Wayside Chapel.

The Red Rock Quilters guild completed an Arizona Centennial quilt featuring an image of Sedona Schnebly picking apples against a background of some of the town of Sedona's most famous views.

A statue with the likeness of Sedona was commissioned by the Sedona Red Rocks Arts Council to honor Sedona's memory. The statue which was made in 1994 by Susan Kliewer, a local artist was unveiled on October 1, 1994, in front of the Sedona Public Library located at 3250 White Bear Road. It was Sedona's first Art in Public Places project. The plaque on the base of the statue reads as follows

Sedona Miller Schnebly and her family were early farmers in the Oak Creek area. Sedona's husband, Theodore Carl (T.C.) Schnebly, organized the town's first post office and gave the new town his wife's name. Sedona boarded visitors, organized Sedona's first Sunday school and fundraised for the Wayside Chapel, which was completed and dedicated to her in 1950. She is representative of the hardworking farm women who helped to build their family farms and communities.

Region: North Central Arizona

Theme: Women in Domestic Life, Women and Community Building

The town of Sedona dedicated a garden to her, the Sedona Schnebly Memorial Garden, which is located at 260 Schnebly Hill Road.

== See also ==
- List of historic properties in Sedona, Arizona
- List of American places named after people
- Schnebly Hill Formation

=== Arizona pioneers ===
- Mansel Carter
- Bill Downing
- Henry Garfias
- Winston C. Hackett
- John C. Lincoln
- Paul W. Litchfield
- Joe Mayer
- William John Murphy
- Wing F. Ong
- Levi Ruggles
- Michael Sullivan
- Trinidad Swilling
- Ora Rush Weed
- Henry Wickenburg
