= Rio Vista Pond =

Lake in Peoria, Maricopa County, Arizona

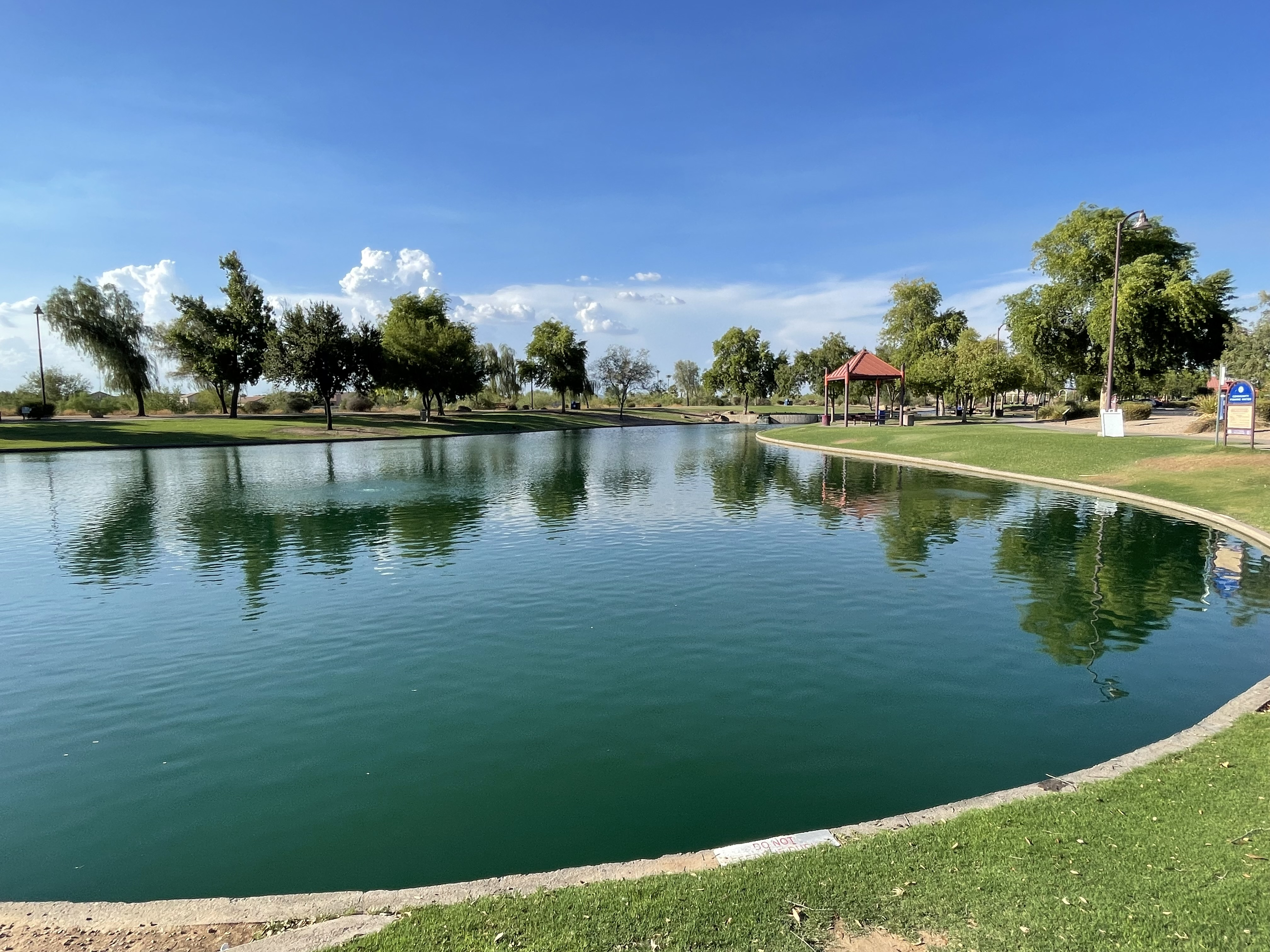
- Rio Vista Pond in July 2023.

- Location within Arizona
- Location: Peoria, Arizona
- Coordinates: 33°36′55″N 112°14′41″W
- Type: Artificial Pond
- Basin countries: United States
- Max. length: 1,373 ft (418 m)
- Max. width: 200 ft (61 m)
- Surface area: 2.5 acres (1.0 ha)
- Average depth: 7 ft (2.1 m)
- Max. depth: 13 ft (4.0 m)
- Surface elevation: 1,100 ft (340 m)
- Settlements: Peoria

Rio Vista Pond is located in Rio Vista Park in south central Peoria, Arizona, United States, on Rio Vista Boulevard, just north of Thunderbird Road.

== Fish species ==
- Rainbow trout
- Largemouth bass
- Sunfish
- Catfish (channel)
- Tilapia
- Carp

== See also ==
- Indian Mesa
- List of historic properties in Peoria, Arizona
- Peoria, Arizona
- Weedville
