= Catlin Court Historic District =

Historic district 'in Arizona, United States

- Glendale Townsite – Catlin Court Historic District
- U.S. National Register of Historic Places
- U.S. Historic district
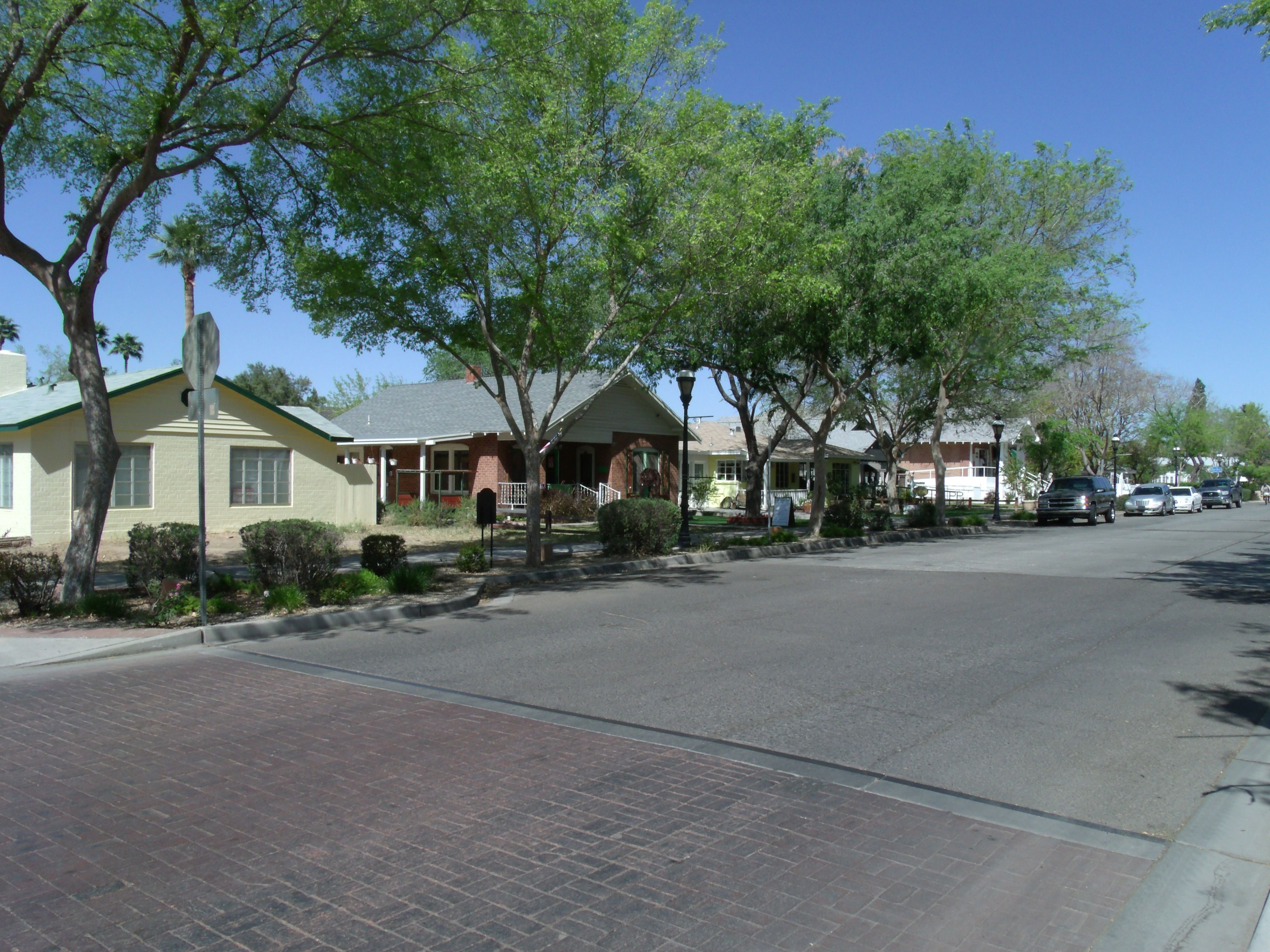
- Catlin Court Historic District as viewed from 58th Drive

- Location within Arizona
- Location: Bounded by Gardenia Ave., 59th Ave., Palmarie Ave. and 58th Ave.
- Coordinates: 33°32′37″N 112°11′01″W
- Built: 1914
- Architectural style: Bungalow
- NRHP reference No.: 92000680 (original); 07001088 (increase)

Significant dates
- Boundary increase: October 20, 2007
- Designated HD: June 9, 1992

The Catlin Court Historic District, established in 1914, is significant for its historic association with an important period in the development of the city of Glendale, Arizona, United States.

== History ==
Glendale was founded by William John Murphy in 1892 and was incorporated as a town in 1910. Glendale's economy depended mainly on the agricultural products produced in its farmlands. It wasn't until 1902, when the Beet Sugar Factory was built and established in the town, that the town began to grow. The demand of new housing made the real estate around the Glendale Town site a profitable venture.

=== Subdivision ===
Various businessmen invested in the lands around the town site. Among the investors were Lafayette Myers, president of the Glendale State Bank and Otto R. Hansen, a businessman from Wisconsin. By 1914, Hansen subdivided the land in the area into residential lots which he named "Catlin Court" (after his wife's maiden name). Myers together with A.A. Carrick, a local businessman, formed a real estate agency to promote the sale of the lots. Catlin Court became the first organized building expansion and development program in the city.

=== Architecture ===
The most common architectural style of the homes are that of the bungalow. Homes in this style which can still be found here are the Otto R. Hansen House, C.M. Wood House" and Green McBee/J.B. Ingram House.

The Catlin Court Historic District is located in the area bounded by Gardenia Ave., 59th Ave., Palmarie Ave. and 58th Ave. The district was listed in the National Register of Historic Places on June 9, 1992. It is the first of ten districts in Glendale to be designated as historical by the National Register of Historic Places. The other nine are the 59th Avenue Residential Historic District, Floralcroft Historic District, Glendale Gardens Historic District, Glendale Tract Historic District, Northfield Historic District, Myrtle Avenue Residential Historic District, Sage Acres Historic District, Sands Estate Historic District and Thunderbird Estates and The McDonald Addition Historic District.

== Historic houses ==
The following is a brief description with the images of some of the houses found in the Catlin Court Historic District. These historic houses are listed as part of the Glendale Townsite Catlin Court Historic District and were therefore listed in the National Register of Historic Places on June 9, 1992. The houses are also considered as significantly historical by the Glendale Historic Building Survey of 1980 and the Glendale Historic Society.

== See also ==
- Adobe Mountain Desert Park
- Manistee Ranch
- Sahuaro Ranch
- Glendale Memorial Park Cemetery
- USS Arizona salvaged artifacts
- List of National Historic Landmarks in Arizona
- List of historic properties in Glendale, Arizona
- National Register of Historic Places listings in Arizona
- National Register of Historic Places listings in Phoenix, Arizona
- National Register of Historic Places listings in Maricopa County, Arizona
- Bungalows in Arizona
