= William John Murphy =

Founder of Glendale, Arizona (1839–1923)

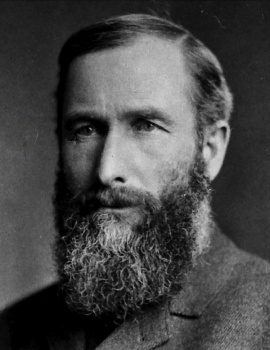
- William John Murphy, c. 1905
- Born: August 23, 1839; New Hartford, New York
- Died: April 17, 1923 (aged 83); Phoenix, Arizona
- Occupation(s): Businessman, contractor and land developer

William John Murphy (August 23, 1839 – April 17, 1923) was an American businessman, contractor, land developer and founder of the Arizona Improvement Company. He is also remembered as the "Founder of Glendale, Arizona" and an important contributor to much of the early development in the Phoenix area.

== Early life ==
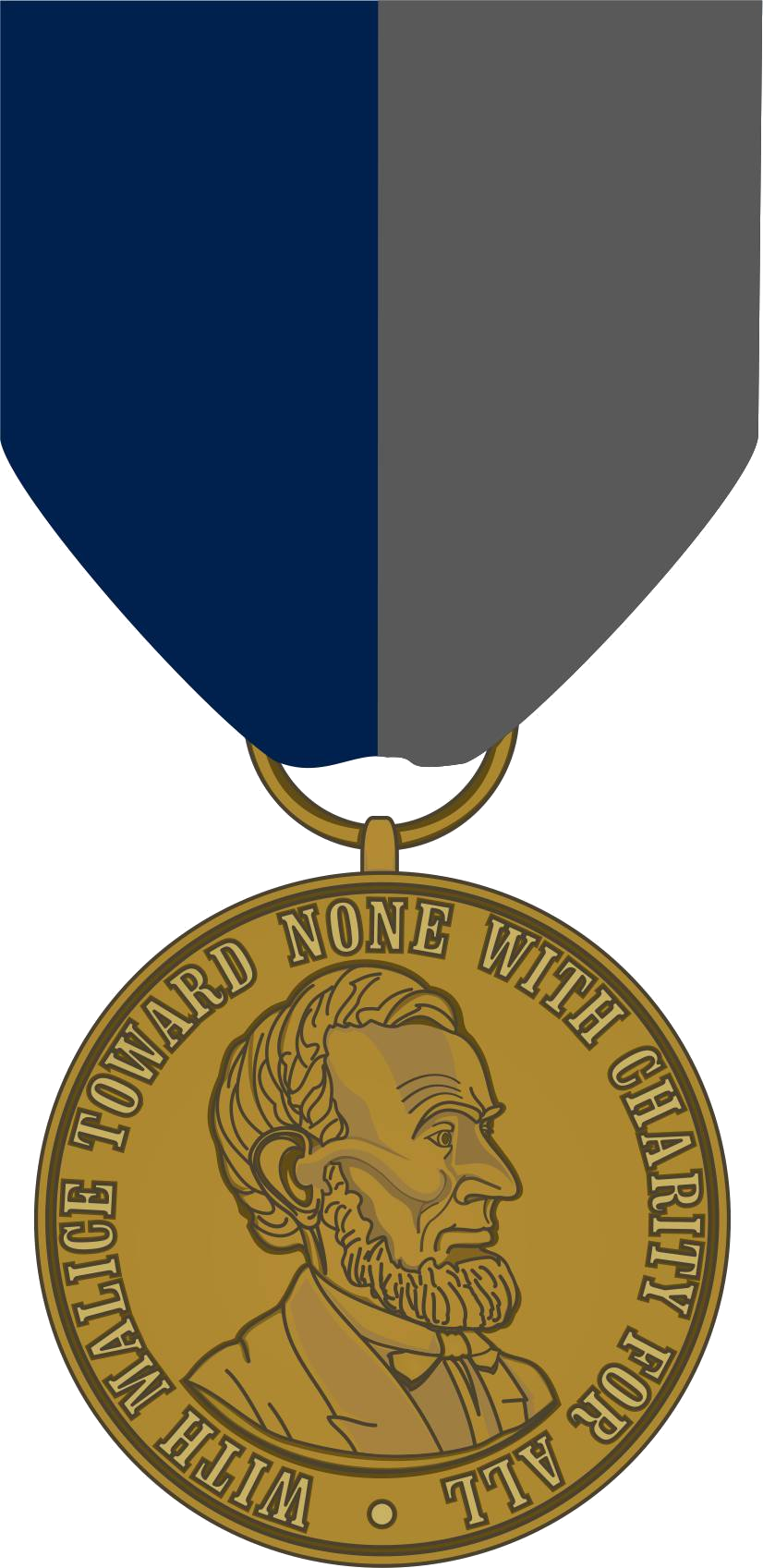
Army Civil War Campaign Medal

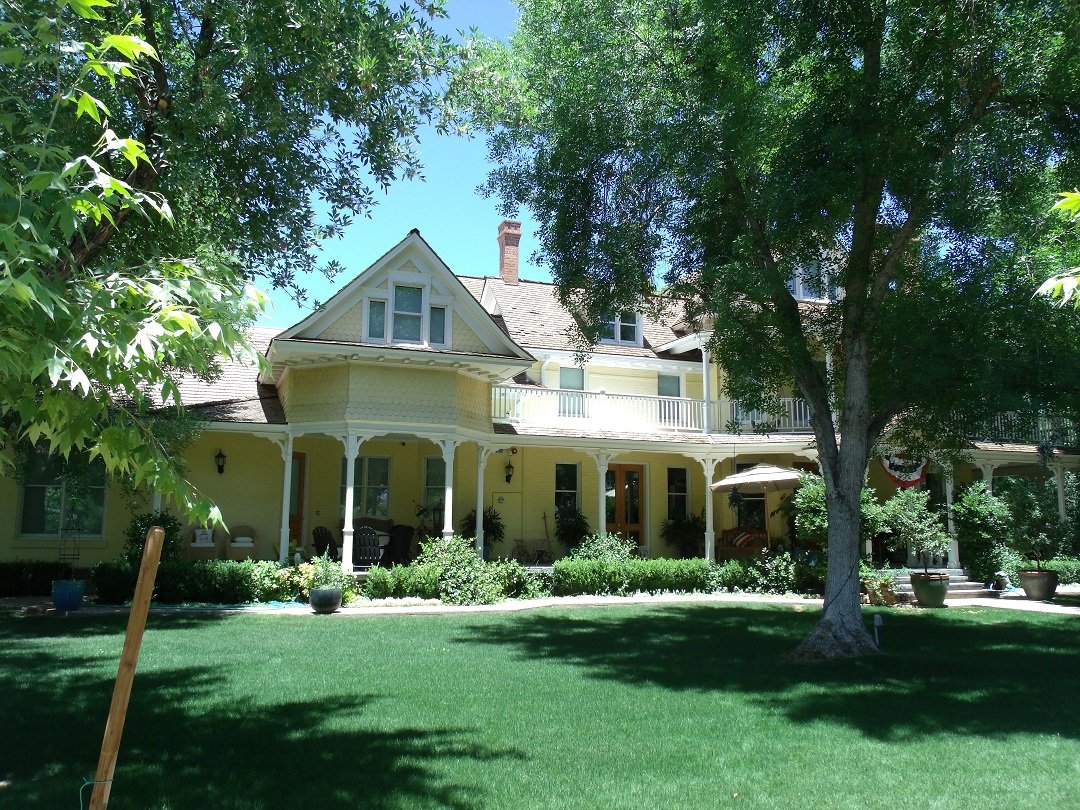
The William J. Murphy House was built in 1895 and is located at 10 W Orangewood Ave. in Phoenix, Arizona

Murphy was born in New Hartford, New York, to George Alexander Murphy and Nancy Allen, both immigrants from County Antrim, Northern Ireland. His family soon moved to the state of Ohio, where he received his primary education. During his youth, his family moved to Chicago and later Pontiac, Illinois, where he continued to receive his education.

Murphy joined the Union Army upon the outbreak of the American Civil War and participated in the Battle of Atlanta on July 22, 1864, as an officer under the command of General William T. Sherman. The Union forces overwhelmed and defeated Confederate forces defending the city under General John Bell Hood. Murphy was honorably discharged from the military on July 24, 1865. He was awarded the Army Civil War Campaign Medal for his participation in the war.

After the war, Murphy met and married Mary C. Bigelow, a native of Nashville, Tennessee. In Nashville, he lived with his wife and two children until April 1871, when his wife died. That same year he met and married Laura Jane Fulwiler and they had four children, born between 1876 and 1883.

== The Arizona Canal Co. ==
In 1880, Murphy moved with his family to what was then known as the Arizona Territory. During this time Murphy was contracted with railroad companies including the Atlantic and Pacific Railroad for grading and road work services. The family first moved to Flagstaff and later to Prescott.

Murphy learned about the Arizona Canal Company project, which would bring water to the arid lands of Maricopa County. In 1882, he joined three Arizona builders, M.W. Kales, William A. Hancock and Clark Churchill, and together they landed a $500,000 contract to build the 40-mile-long (64 km) Arizona Canal from Granite Reef to New River. With the use of whatever machinery was available and the help of 225 mules, Murphy and his team completed the canal by 1885. Murphy soon found himself deep in debt since he had agreed to be paid in Arizona Canal Company stock, bonds, and land instead of cash.

== Glendale, Arizona ==
In 1887, Murphy founded the Arizona Improvement Company. His objective was to sell the land and water rights south of the canal; he decided to name the area "Glendale". Murphy had to raise capital from out-of-state sources in order to meet payroll and construction expenses. In order to develop and interest potential investors and settlers in the new town, Murphy decided to provide a better means of access between Phoenix, Glendale, and the neighboring town of Peoria by building an 18-mile-long (29 km) diagonal road which he named Grand Avenue.

In 1891, Burgess Hadsell worked with Murphy to bring 70 Brethren and River Brethren families to Glendale to form a temperance colony. Attracted by the town's ban on alcoholic beverages, other settlers continued to arrive. In 1895, Murphy platted the original town site and amended the plat to include a town park and some business lots. The construction of a railroad from Prescott to Phoenix was made possible with an exchange of the right-of-way made by Murphy along Grand Avenue. The railroad allowed Glendale settlers to transport goods to the north and easily receive building materials.

Murphy and his family lived on a ranch located at 10 W. Orangewood Avenue, near the intersection with Central Avenue, in Phoenix. He began to develop his land and experimented with the cultivation of 1,800 orange and other citrus fruit trees which he imported from California. The success of his experimentation helped open the eastern markets to Arizona landowners and farmers. Murphy is credited with establishing the Valley's citrus industry in the northern extension of Central Avenue in 1895. The roadway, which he developed, was first paved in 1920, and cut through the Orangewood subdivision. Known as the "Murphy Bridle Path", it begins at Bethany Home Road and ends 2.5 miles (4.0 km) north at the Arizona Canal. The earliest known reference to the Murphy Bridle Path, discovered by the city's historic preservation office, dates to 1948, when the bridle path was dedicated by the "Arizona Horse Lover's Club". The North Central Avenue streetscape is now on the Phoenix Historic Property Register and has been nominated to the National Register of Historic Places.

Murphy's successes in the cultivation of citrus fruit trees also inspired him to consider the development of a sugar beet industry for Glendale. Together with other entrepreneurs, he founded the Arizona Sugar Company in 1903 and construction of a $1 million sugar beet factory began that same year. The Eastern Sugar Co., which was responsible for selling bonds for the construction of the factory, failed in their mission and the venture went into receivership. However, in 1905, Murphy was able to secure new investors from New Jersey and Michigan.

Murphy built the Ingleside Club, complete with a golf course, near the Arizona Canal and the town of Scottsdale with the intention of attracting investors and potential landowners to what became known as the Salt River Valley. Murphy donated the town park to the city of Glendale in 1909. In 1911, he developed an electric trolley line from Phoenix to Glendale, which ran between 1911 and 1925.

== Legacy ==
On April 17, 1923, Murphy died in Phoenix, Arizona of heart disease. He is buried in section 5; block 4; lot 2; space 8 in Greenwood/Memory Lawn Mortuary & Cemetery, located at 2300 West Van Buren Street in Phoenix.

Glendale sustains a population of just over 225,000 residents, making it the fourth-largest city in Arizona. According to the Glendale Chamber of Commerce, "The number of households in the Arrowhead Ranch area of Glendale (ZIP code 85308) with at least $1 million in worth increased by 214.4 percent between 1996 and 2001."

In 1912, the park which Murphy donated was renamed Murphy Park in his honor. It is located at 58th and Glendale Avenues and has a public library. Murphy's family home at 10 W Orangewood Avenue is preserved as the William J. Murphy House. The Murphy Bridle Path also exists today; the trail runs along Central Avenue between Bethany Home Road and Northern Avenue.

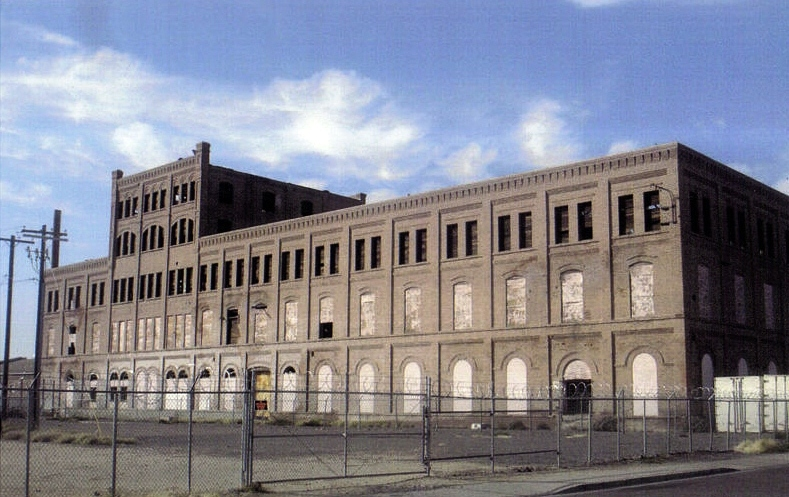
The Sugar Beet Factory Building is listed in the National Register of Historic Places

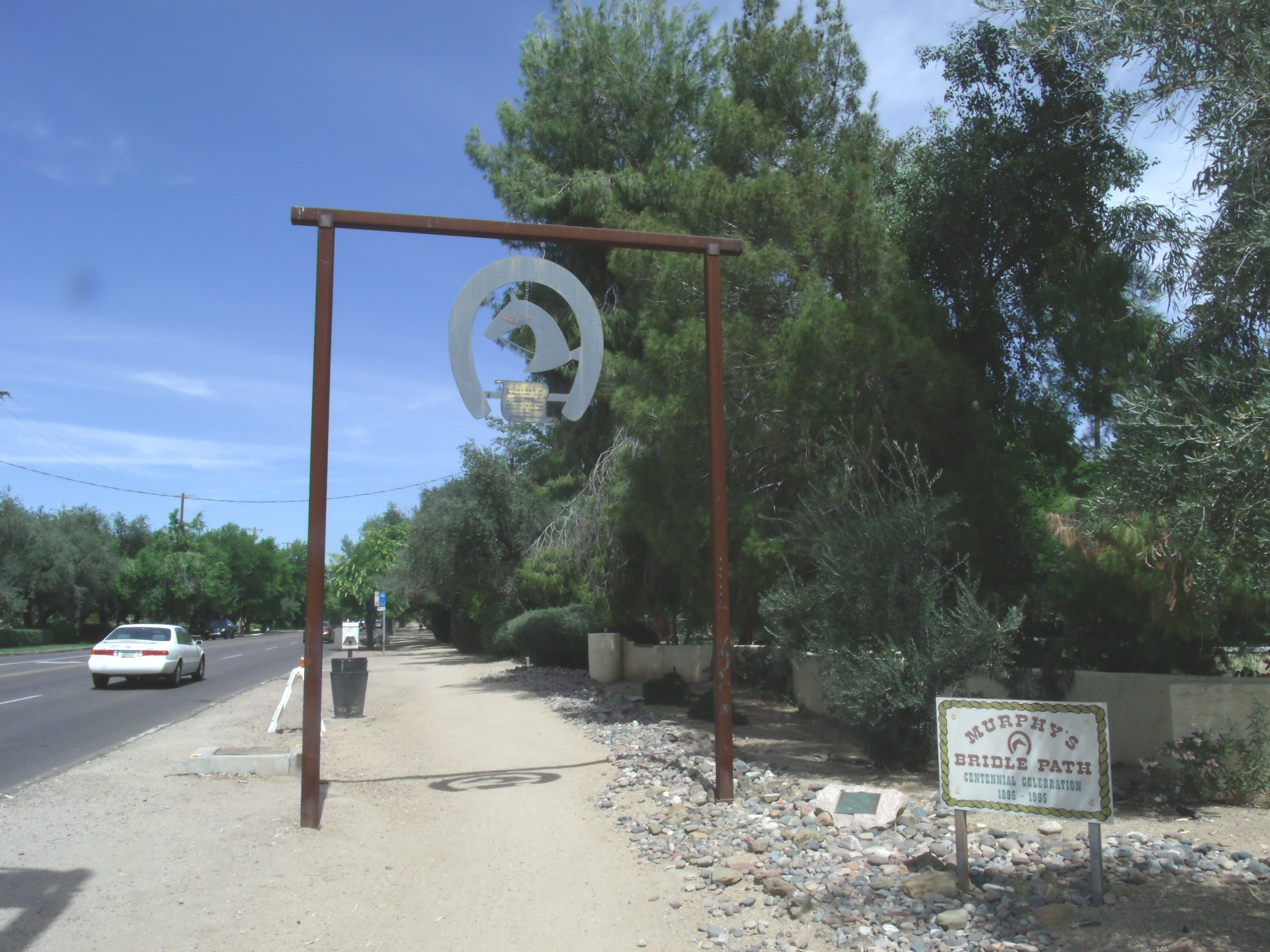
The Murphy Bridle Path

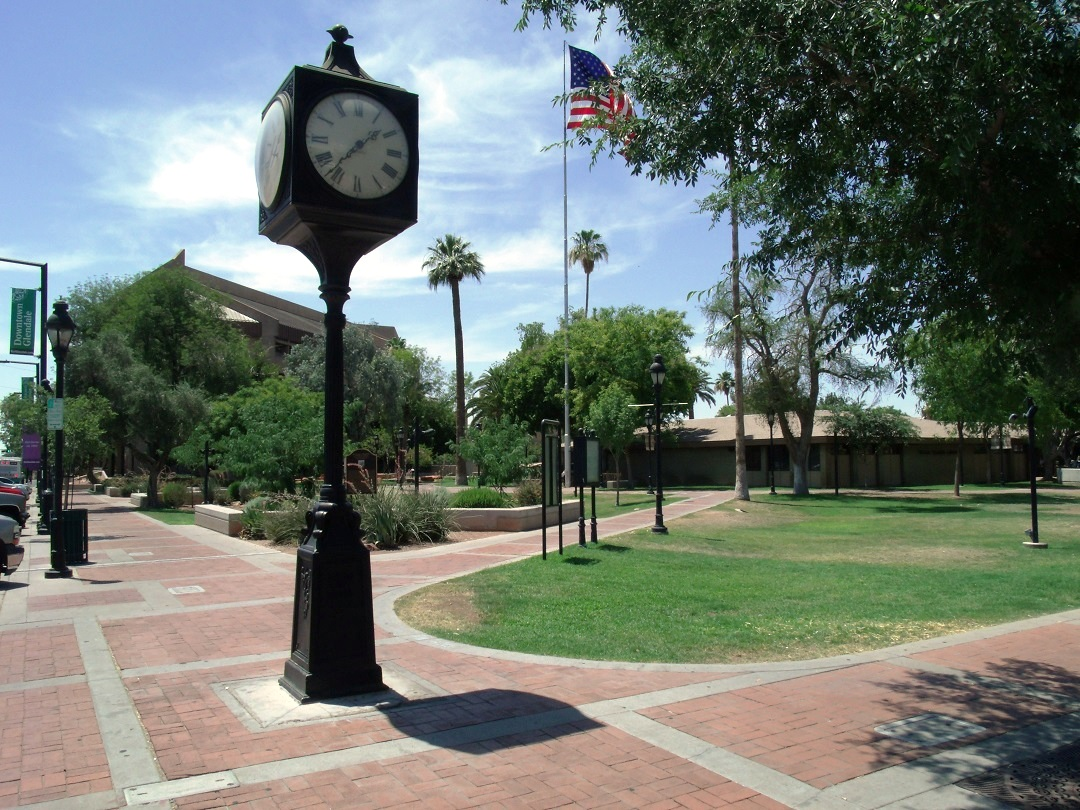
Murphy Park in Glendale

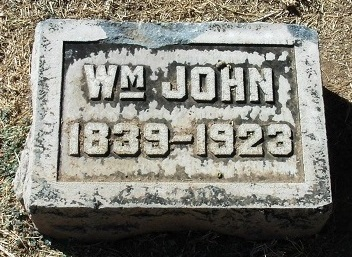
Gravesite marker of William John Murphy

== See also ==
- Arizona Canal
- Catlin Court Historic District
- Sahuaro Ranch
- Manistee Ranch
- List of historic properties in Glendale, Arizona

=== Arizona pioneers ===
- Mansel Carter
- Bill Downing
- Henry Garfias
- Winston C. Hackett
- John C. Lincoln
- Paul W. Litchfield
- Joe Mayer
- Wing F. Ong
- Levi Ruggles
- Sedona Schnebly
- Michael Sullivan
- Trinidad Swilling
- Ora Rush Weed
- Henry Wickenburg
