= Sahuaro Ranch =

- U.S. National Register of Historic Places
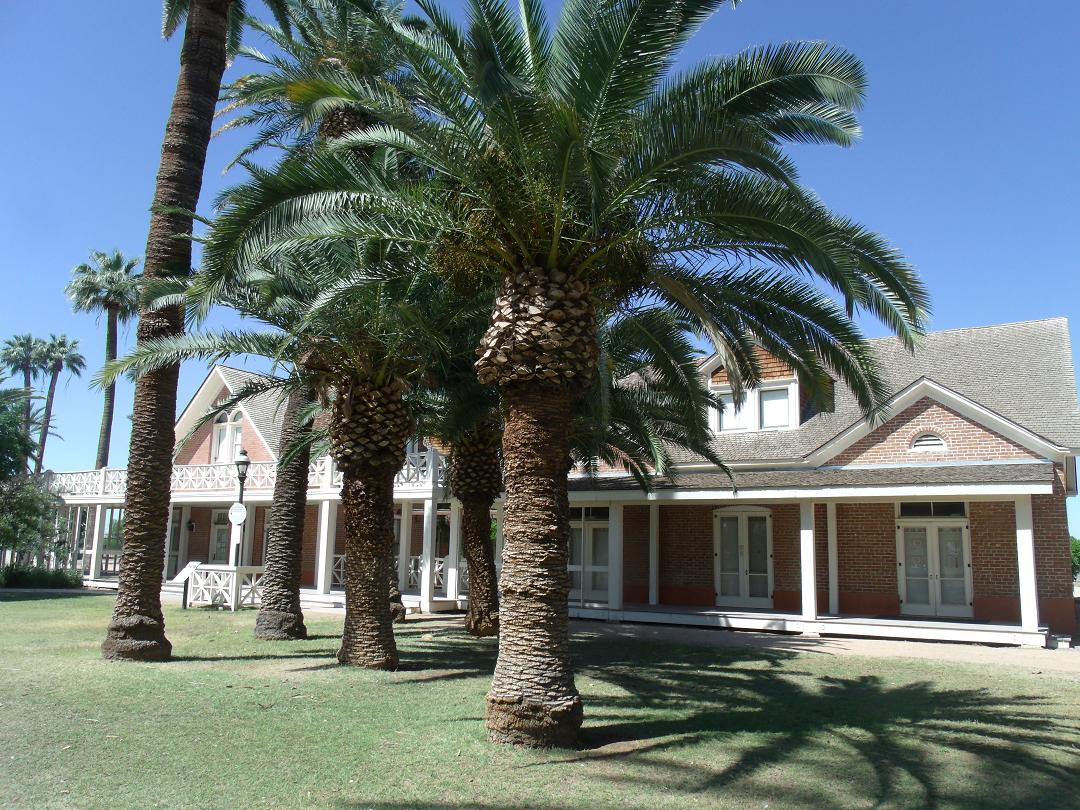
- Main mansion of the Sahuaro Ranch, built in 1886
- Location: 9802 North 59th Avenue and Mountain View, Glendale, Arizona
- Coordinates: 33°32′19″N 112°11′11″W
- Area: 2,000 acres (810 ha)
- Built: 1886
- NRHP reference No.: 80000763
- Added to NRHP: March 7, 1980

Sahuaro Ranch was founded in 1886, by William Henry Bartlett, a native of Illinois. The ranch, located north of what eventually became the city of Glendale, Arizona, was rich in figs and other fruit orchards, vineyards, and fields of alfalfa. The ranch has all of its historical structures restored, and the "Sahuaro Ranch Park" is administered by the Parks and Recreation Department of Glendale.

On March 7, 1980, Sahuaro Ranch was listed in the National Register of Historical Places.

== Ranch history ==
=== Bartlett era (1880 - 1913) ===
William Henry Bartlett and his brother were wealthy businessmen from Peoria, Illinois who homesteaded lands in what was to become the future the City of Glendale founded by William John Murphy. What made an investment attractive was the completion of the Arizona Canal in 1885. The canal allowed 100,000 acres (40468.564 hec or 40468 hec (hectare) and 5642.2 m^{2}) of desert land to be opened up to homesteading and irrigation farming. The Homestead Act was a United States federal law that gave an applicant ownership at no cost of farmland called a "homestead."

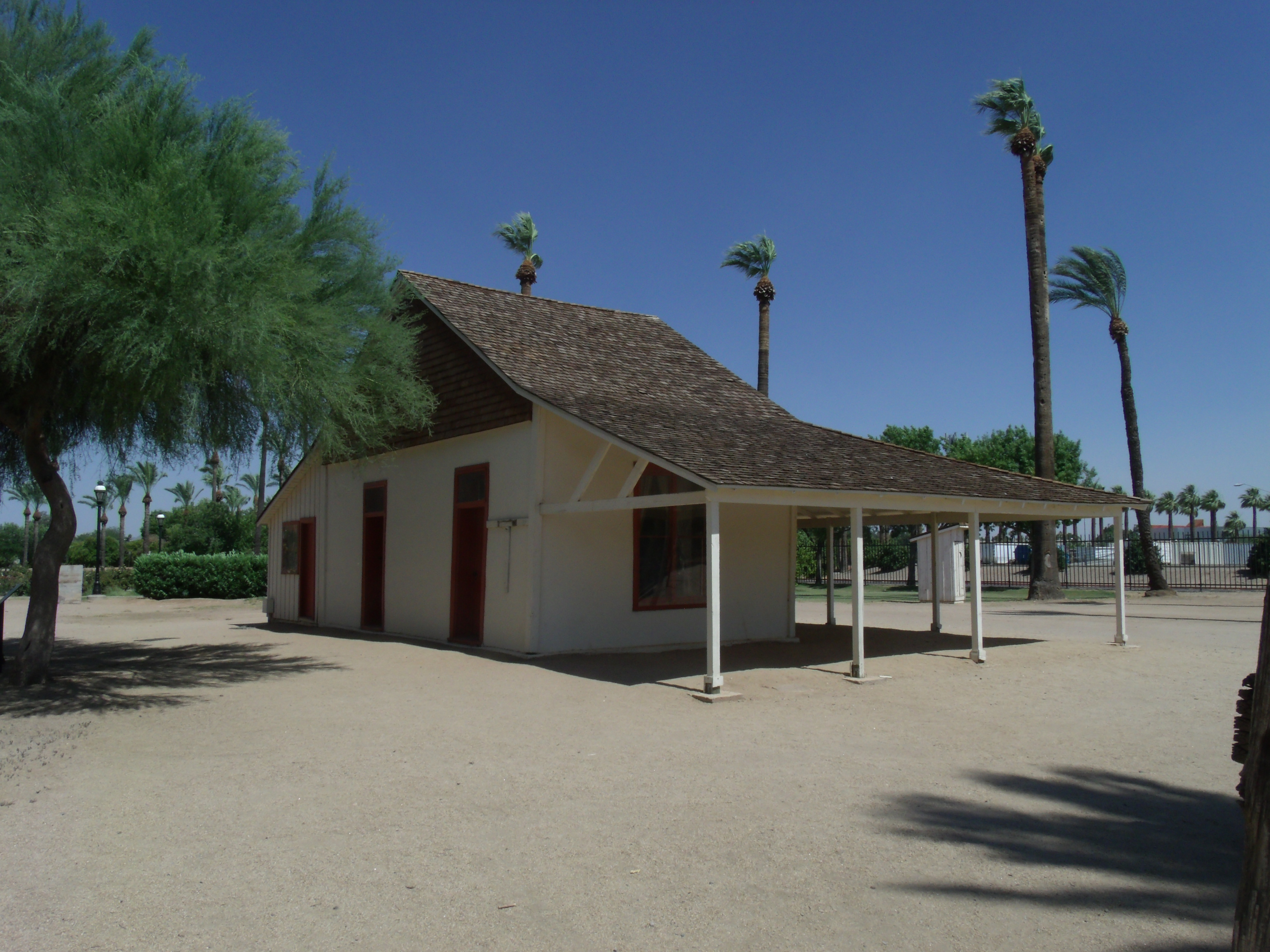
Adobe house - the first house built in Sahuaro Ranch

The Bartletts' felt this was a great opportunity to invest in fruit ranching and farming. The brothers were owners of a grain brokerage business, and were amongst the largest traders in the Midwestern farm belt.

By 1891, William Bartlett had under his control 2,000 acres (809.371 hectares or 809 hec and 3712.8 m^{2}) of farmland near Glendale. He established a 640-acre farm (25932.255 hec or 25932 hec and 2559.5 m^{2}) and named it named Sahuaro Ranch. There he planted large citrus and pecan orchards. Even though he never lived permanently at Sahuaro Ranch, Bartlett took an active role in its development and had various buildings and residences built for the people who worked there and for his family. He hired superintendents to manage his ranch operations.

In 1881, the first structure in what was to become the ranch was built. It was an adobe house which served as the residence and office of Stephen H. Campbell, the first superintendent to manage the ranch. In 1895, the superintendent's residence was moved to the main house of the ranch and the adobe house was used to house the ranch employees. Bartlett had his hired hands plant figs and other fruit orchards, vineyards and alfalfa.

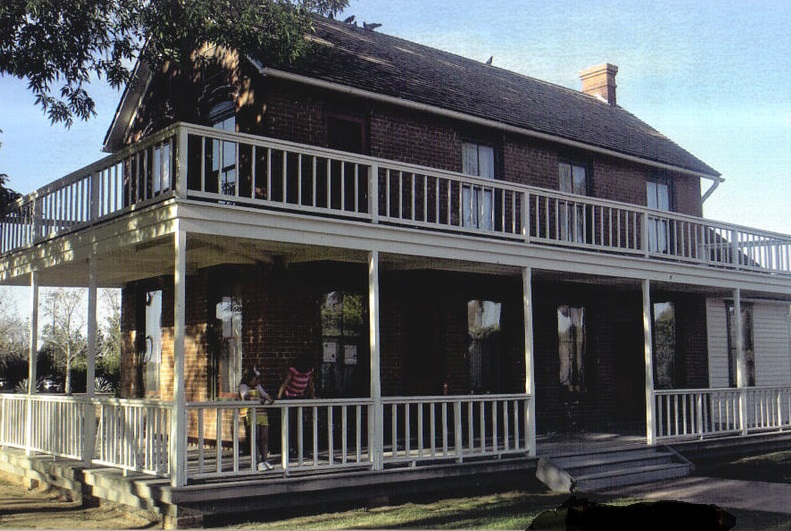
Sahuaro Ranch foreman's house

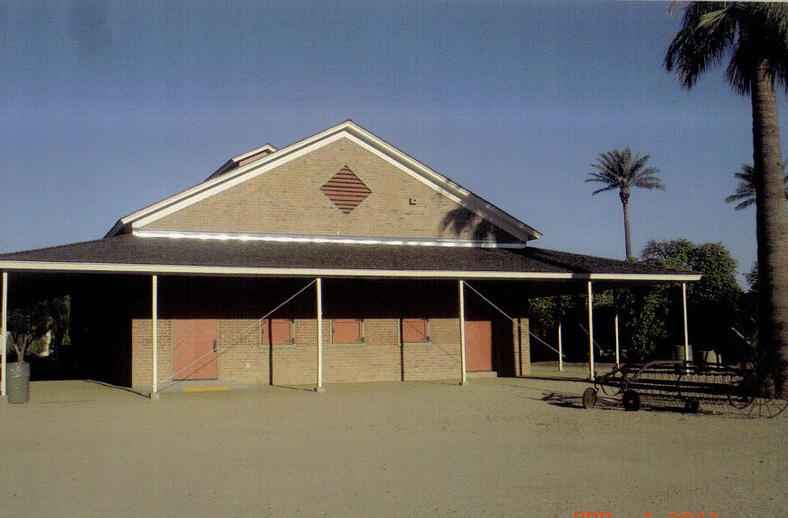
Feed and Storage house

Other structures which were built on the ranch in the 1890s were the Foreman's House, the blacksmith shop and the horse barn. The Fruit Packing House, the largest packing house in the Salt River Valley, was built in 1891.

The farm animals raised in the ranch included cows, bulls and hogs. Between 500 and 1,000 hogs were raised in the ranch in the 1890s. Horses and mules were used to pull orchard wagons, mowers, rakes and other farming equipment.

The Guest House was built in 1898. When Bartlett's youngest son was stricken with tuberculosis while living in Chicago, his doctor recommended that he move to a warmer climate. Bartlett had the guest house building designed to accommodate the needs and comforts of his son and family.

In 1901, Bartlett had a pump house built for an oil-fired electrical generator. The pump house provided electricity to his ranch buildings with the help of a pump water. By 1905, the first automobiles were used in the ranch and Bartlett had a garage built to store his wagons and autos.

=== Bradshaw (1913 - 1927) and Smith (1927 - 1977) eras ===
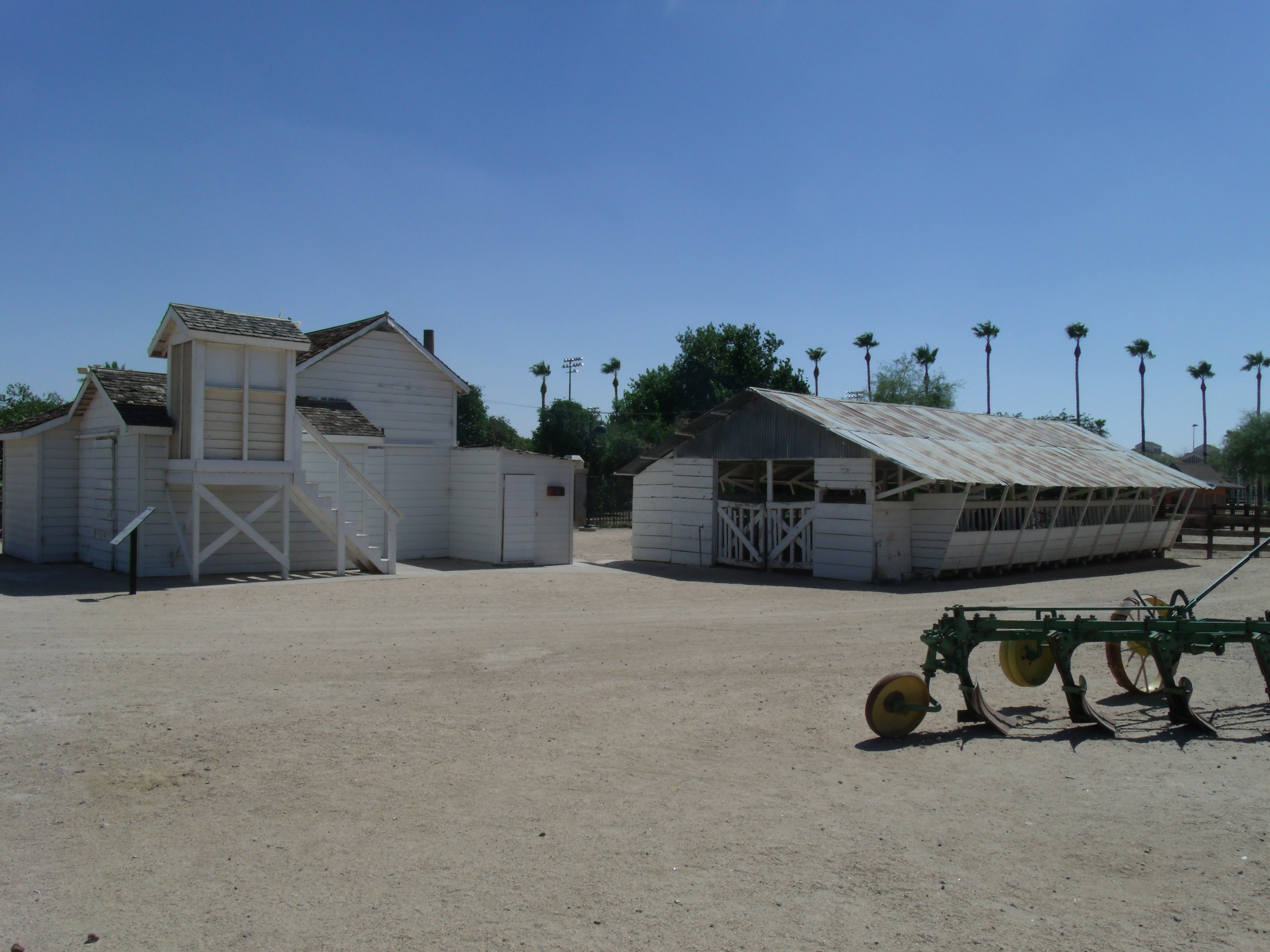
Sahuaro Dairy Barn

In 1913, Peter E. Bradshaw purchased the ranch, and planted long-staple cotton in 1915.

In 1927, Richard W. Smith purchased the ranch and planted large citrus and pecan orchards.

In 1928, Smith built a dairy barn and raised dairy cows commercially. The milk from the cows was sold in bulk and shipped to local dairies in cans.

Richard W. Smith died in 1944. His son, Richard S. Smith, inherited the farm and established a retail dairy on the ranch, known as the Sahuaro Jersey Dairy Milk House.

In the early 1960s, 120 acres of the ranch were sold to develop the Glendale Community College campus.

== National Register of Historic Places ==
In 1966, the City of Glendale, with the initiative of then Mayor Max Klass. began a process to purchase 80 acres (32.3748 hec or 32 hec and 3748.5 m^{2}) of the original 640 acres of the ranch. In 1977, the purchase was made possible by a federal grant and the City of Glendale proceeded to restore the historical structures in the ranch. After the City of Glendale purchased the land, Richard S. Smith was allowed to lease the ranch until 1980.

On March 7, 1980, Sahuaro Ranch was registered on the National Register of Historic Places after the city applied for the registration of 17 acres of the ranch. The ranch is open to the public and is located at 9802 North 59th Avenue and Mountain View.

== The Sahuaro Ranch fire ==
In September 2017, the ranch site endured a string of fires on September 18, 23 and 26. The blacksmith shop, granary building, and the milk house, all caught fire and were permanently destroyed. This was seen as a terrible loss of important historical assets for the community. The park was closed on September 26, 2017, to allow for an investigation of the fires and reopened the following day.

In February 2018, a 14-year-old was arrested for trespassing the night of Sept. 26, 2017, the night of the “most extensive fire” at the park. However, no evidence was ever found to connect the teen to any other crimes, such as the suspected arson.

The buildings were fixed and reopened in February 2020. They were rebuilt to as closely match the style and look of the originals as modern day regulations allowed. The city of Glendale used photographs and staff memories to match the look and had much of the lumber shipped from Flagstaff to get it as unprocessed as possible, as that is how it would have been built in the early 1900s.

== Gallery of historical Sahuaro Ranch ==
Historical structures and equipment used in Sahuaro Ranch

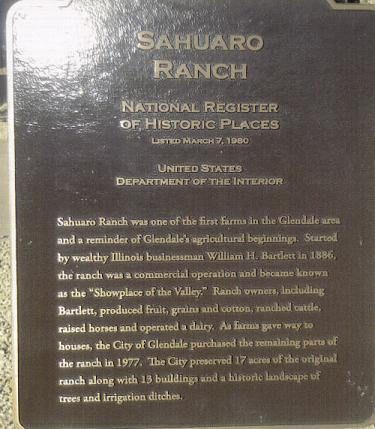
National Register of Historic Places Marker in Sahauro Ranch.

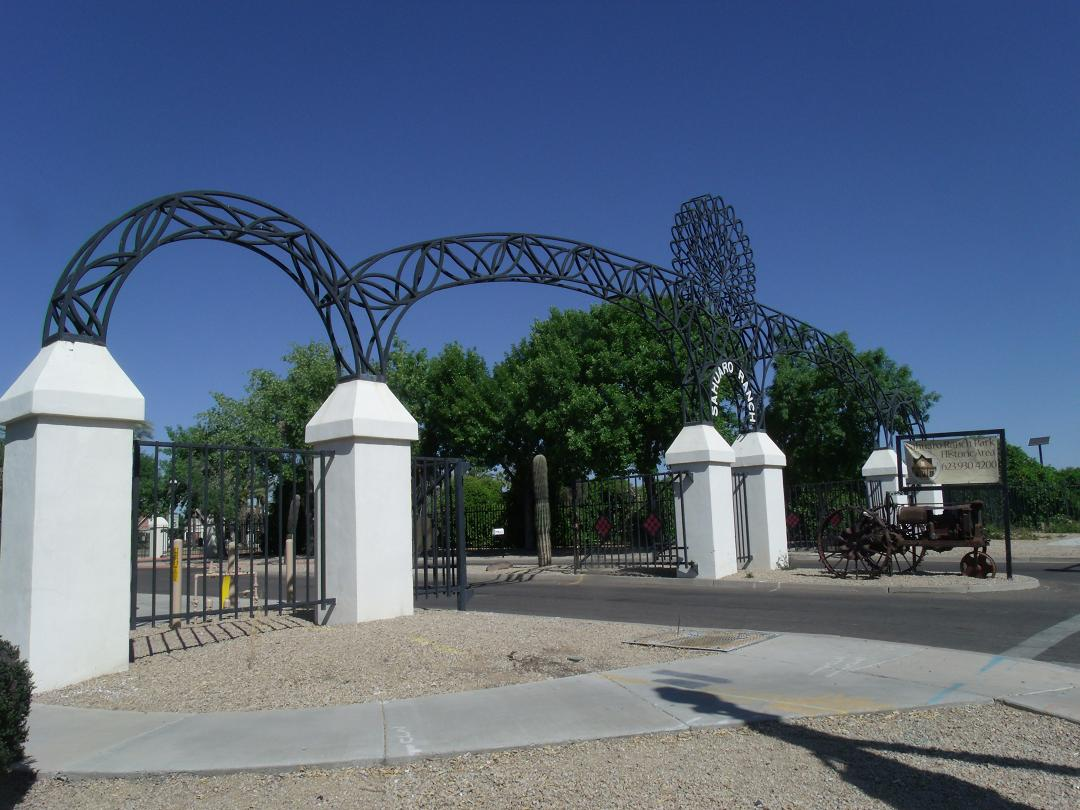
Entrance to Historic Sahuaro Ranch.

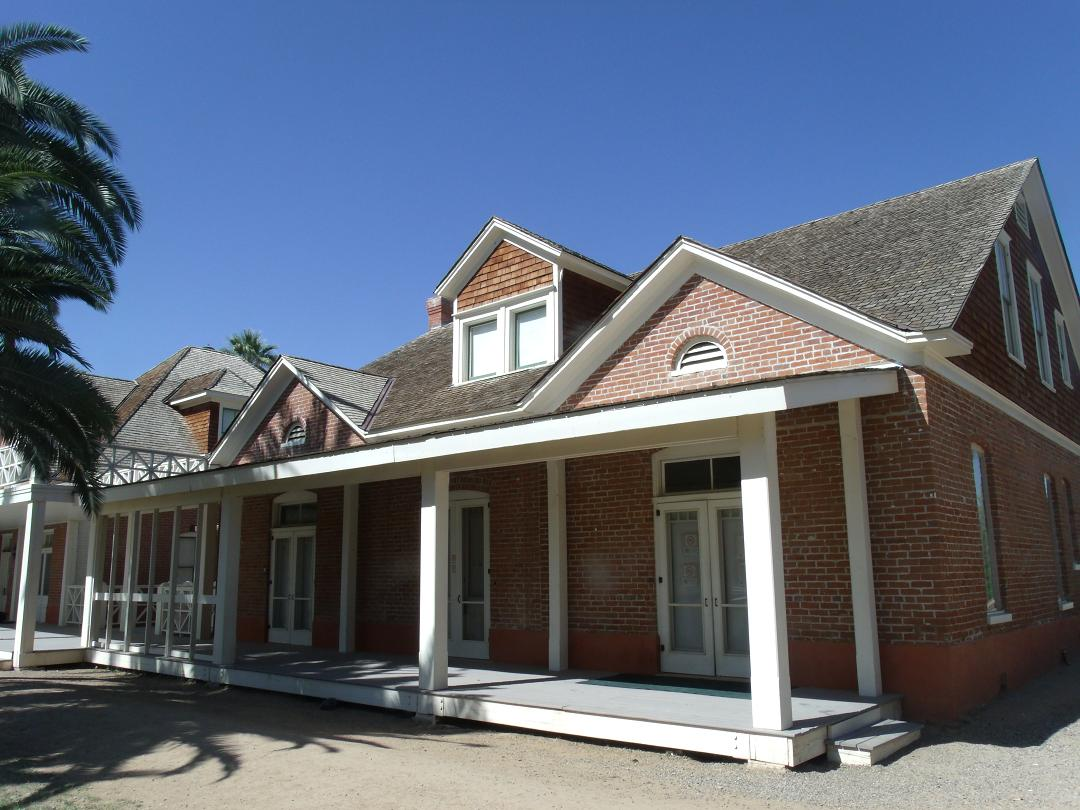
Different view of the Main Mansion in Sahuaro Ranch.

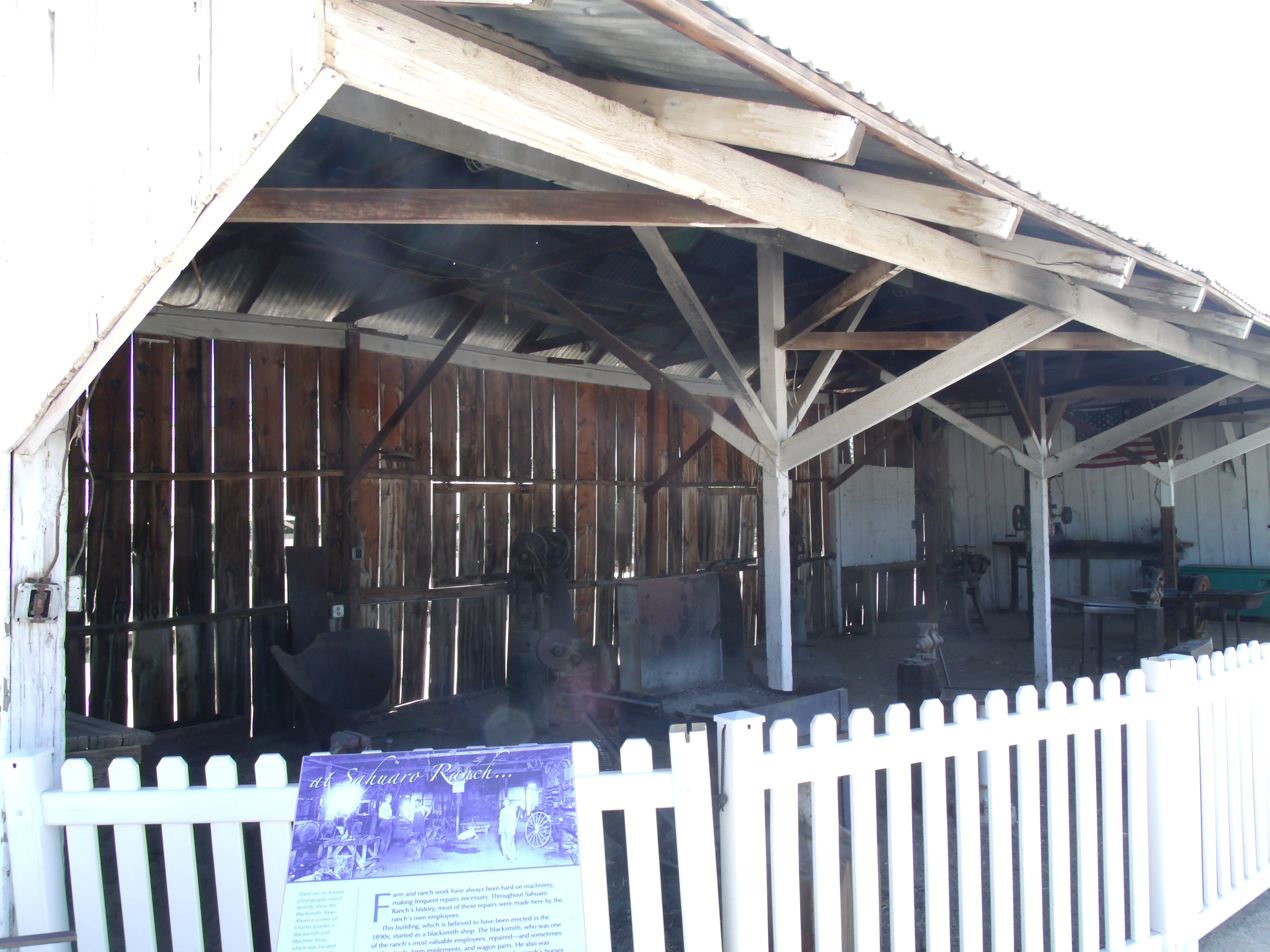
Blacksmith Shop (1890).

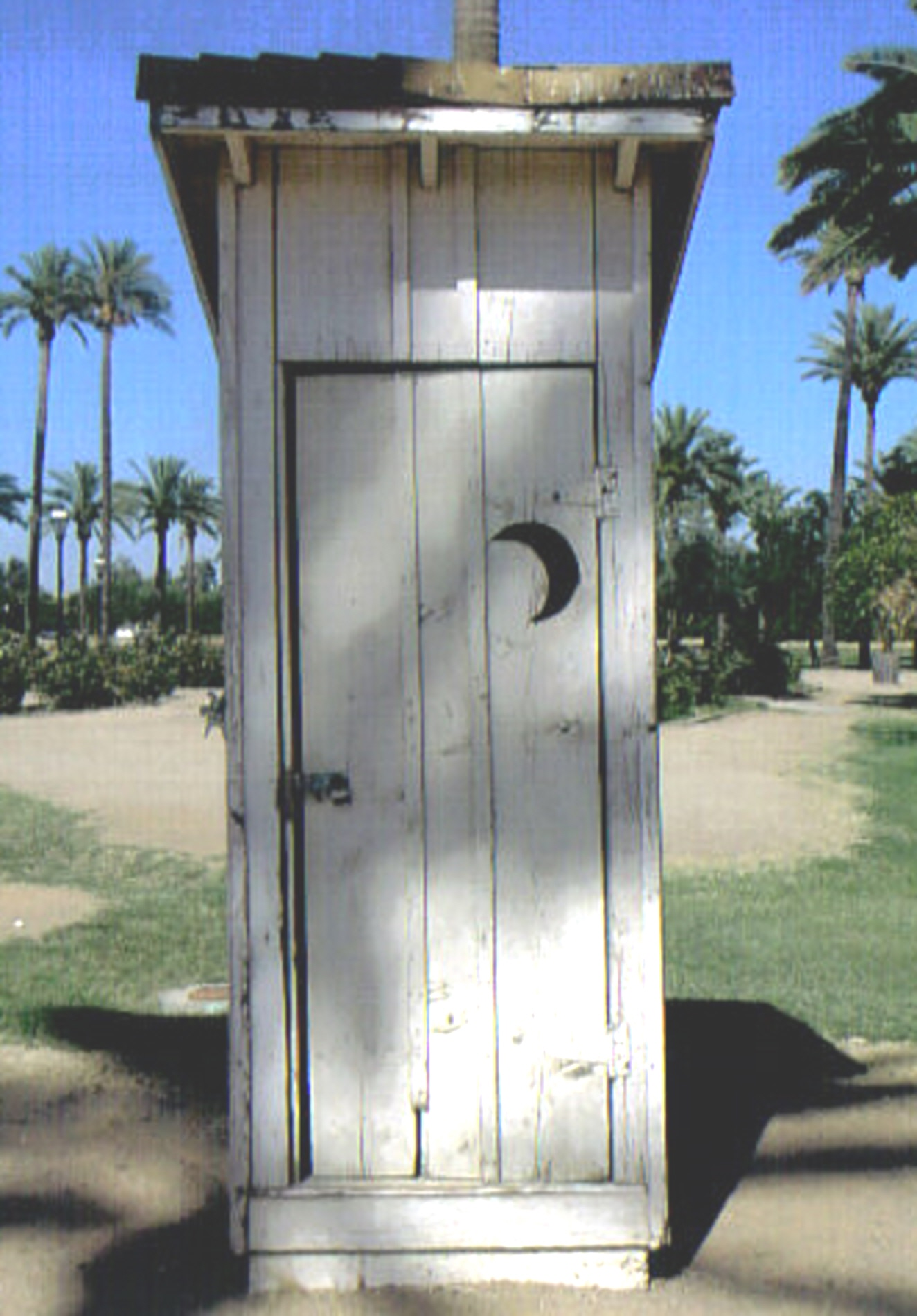
Outhouse (1890).

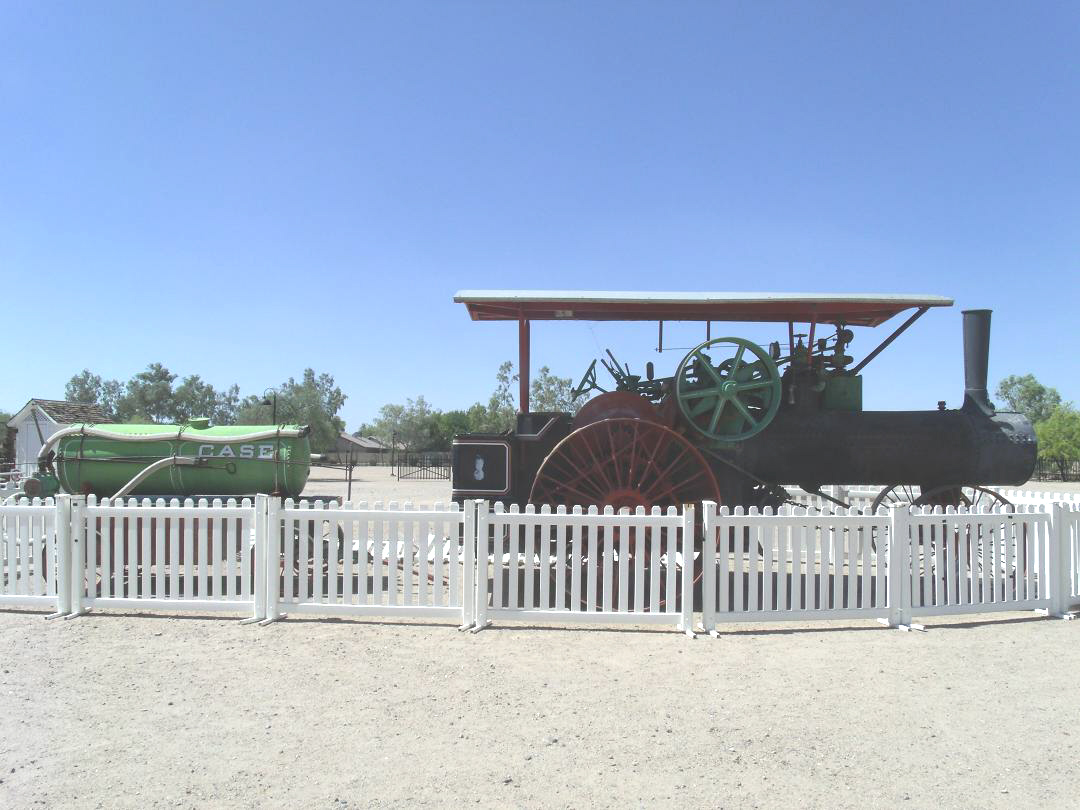
Case Steam Engine used in Sahuaro Ranch.

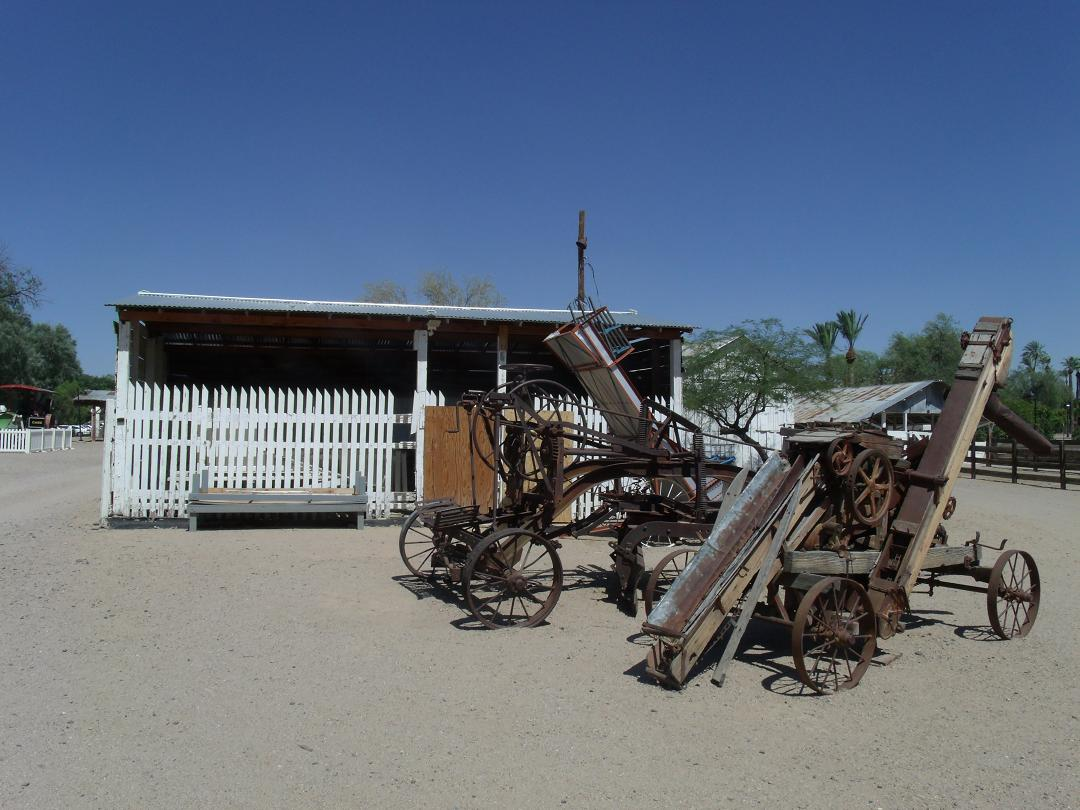
Farm machinery and 1890s Horse Stable (in background).

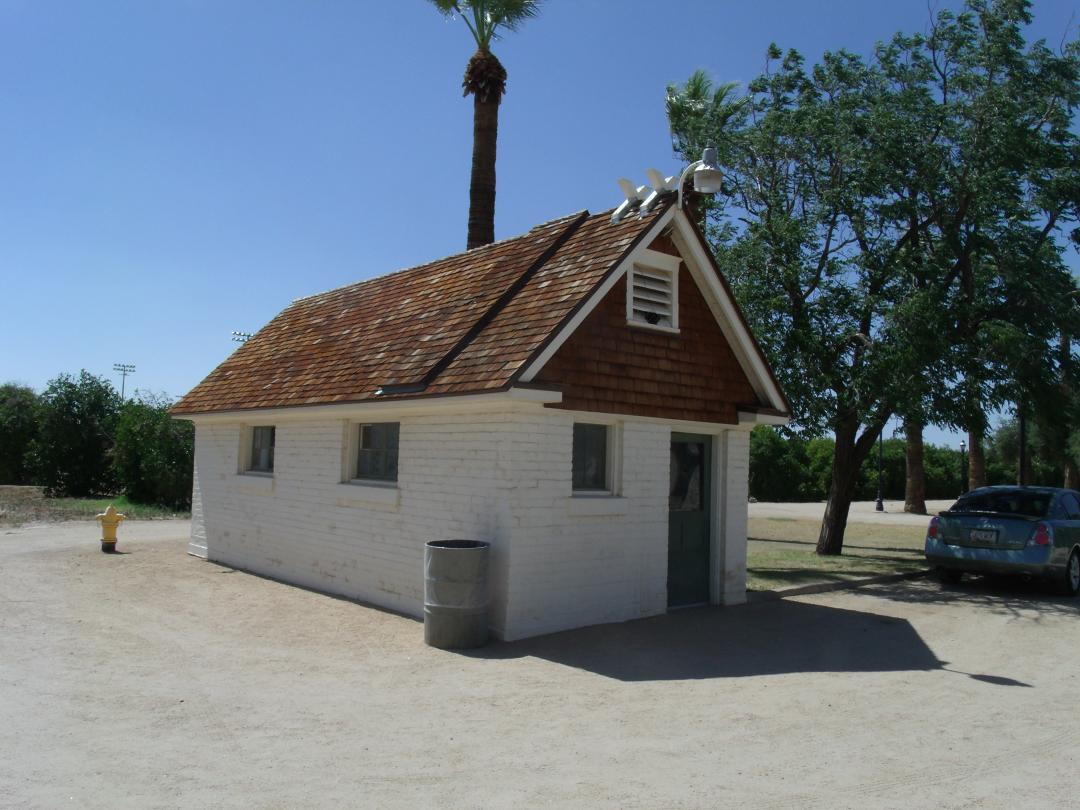
1901 Pump House.

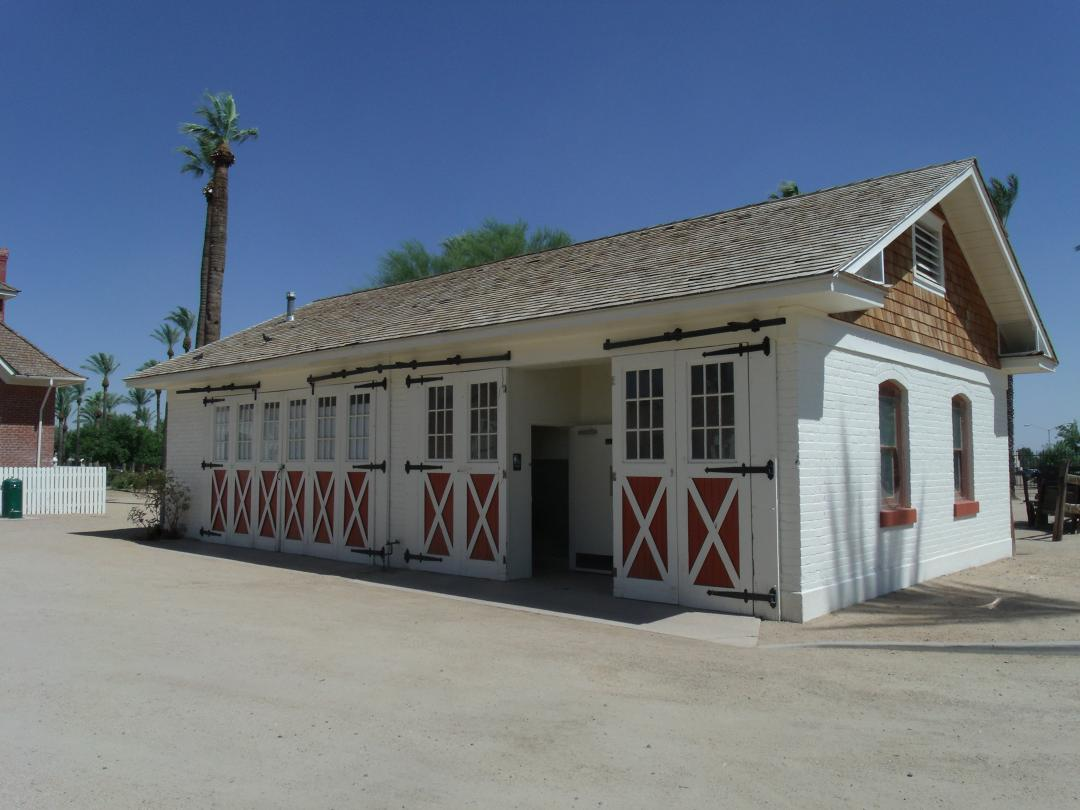
1905 Wagon and auto garage.

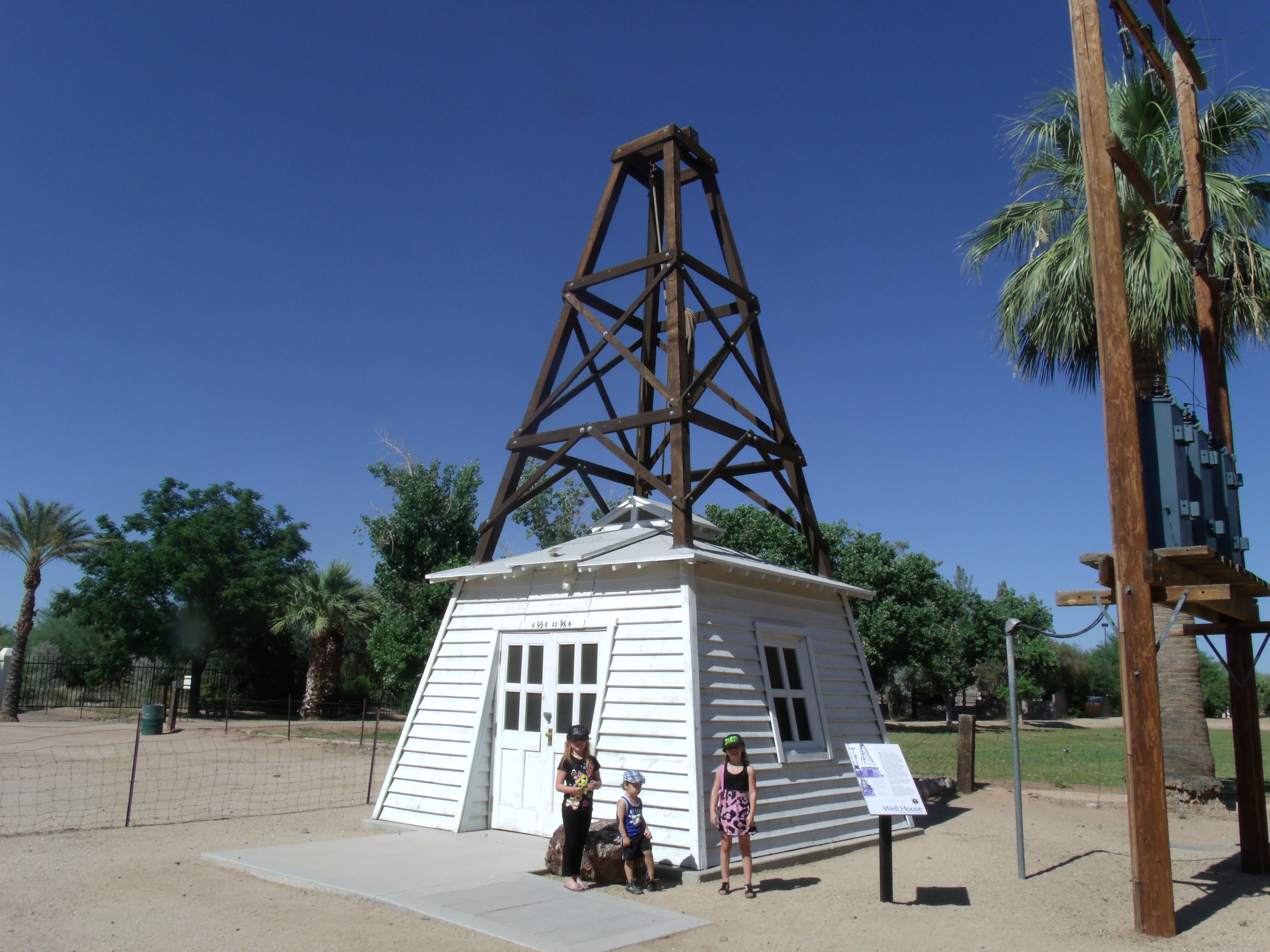
Well House (1920).
Images of the 19th Century interior furnishings and decorations of the Main Mansion and Adobe house.
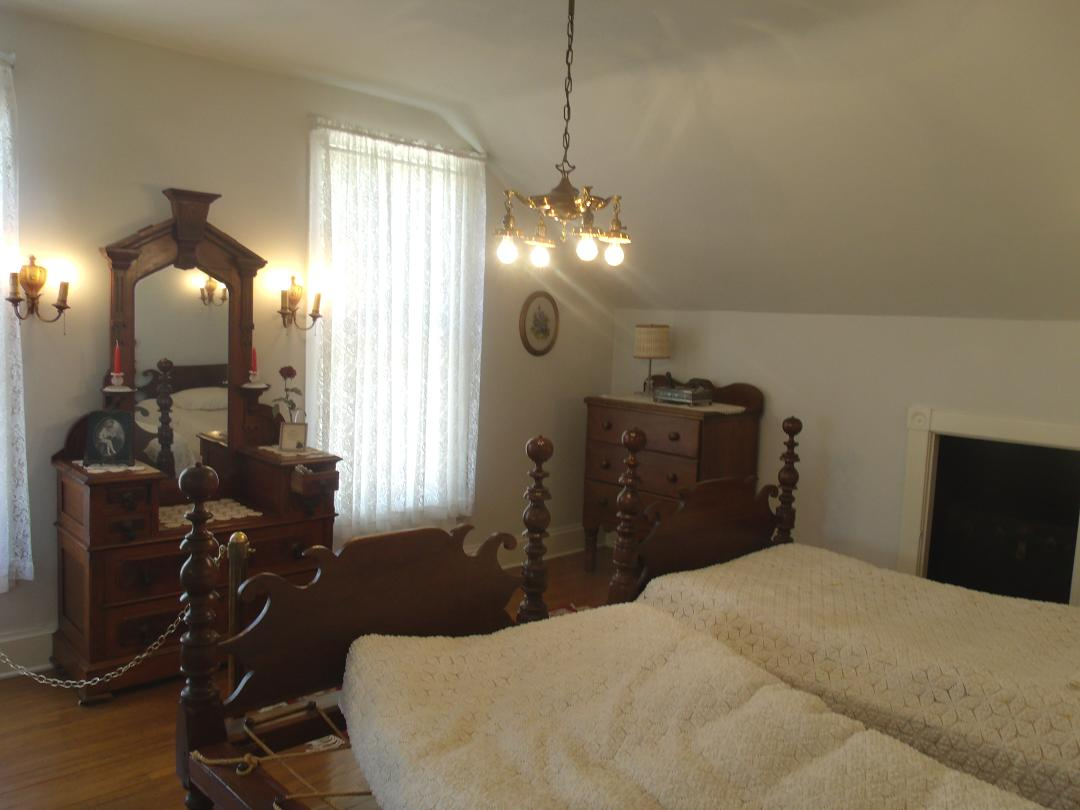
The Smith bedroom on the second floor of the main mansion.

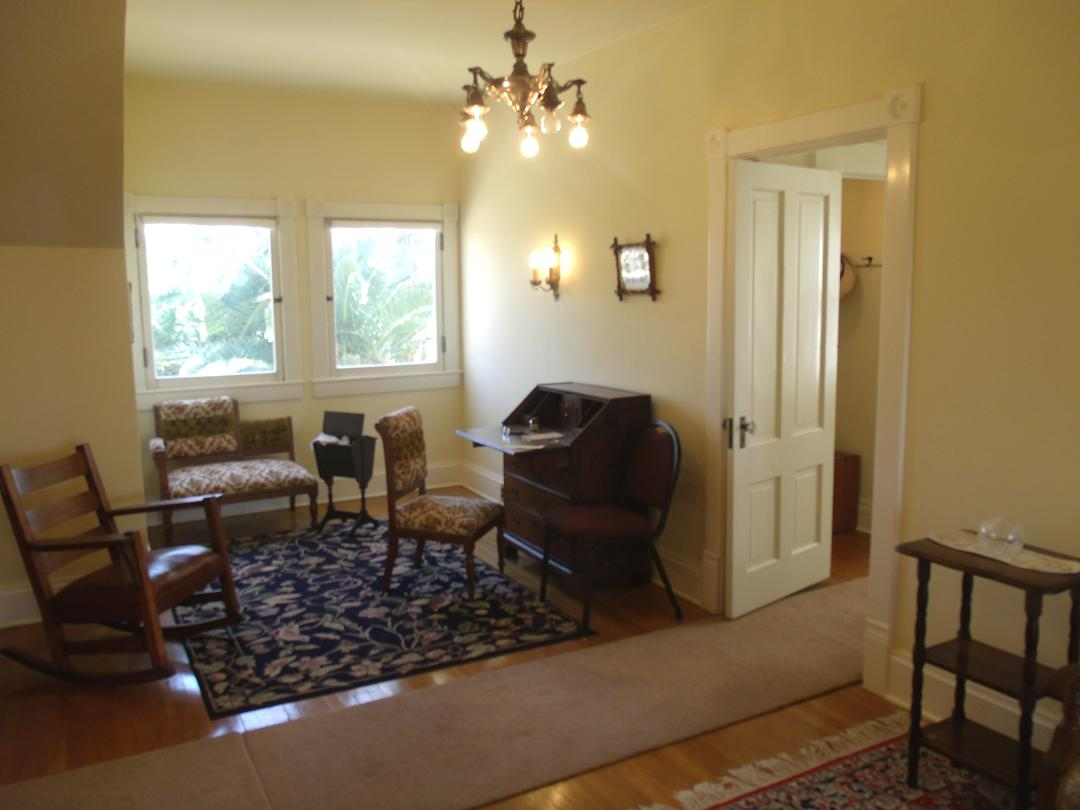
Small study in the hallway of the second floor of the main mansion.

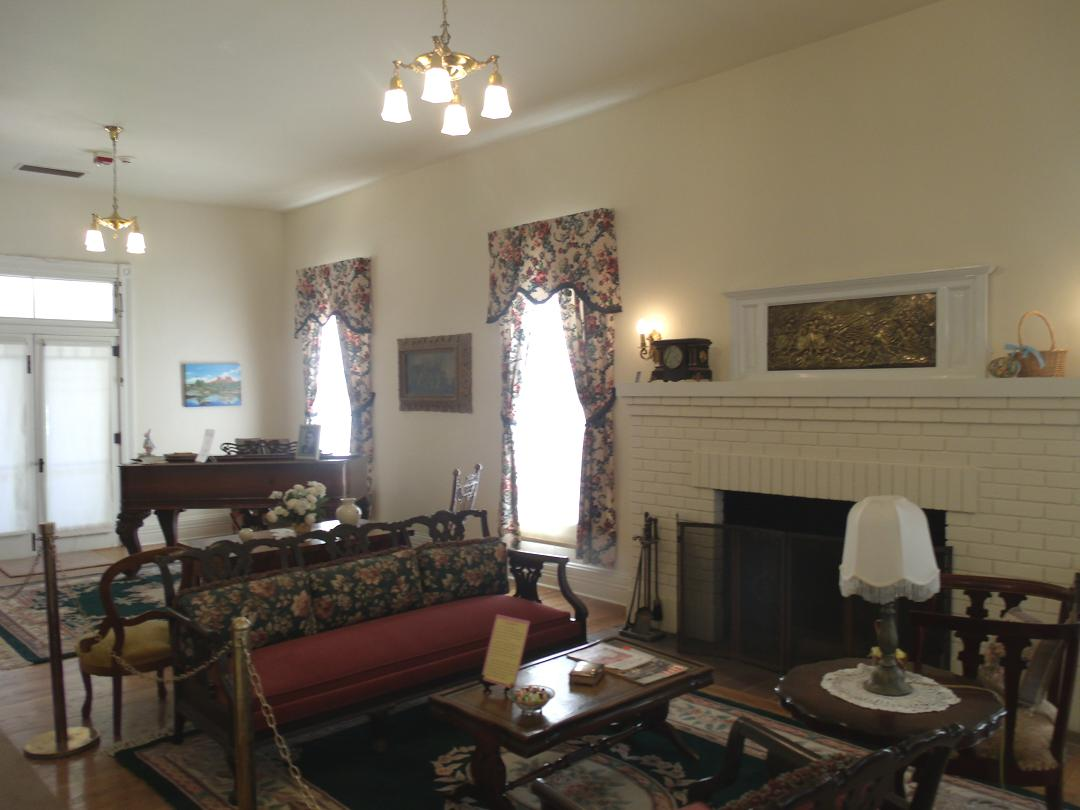
Living room in the first floor of the main mansion.

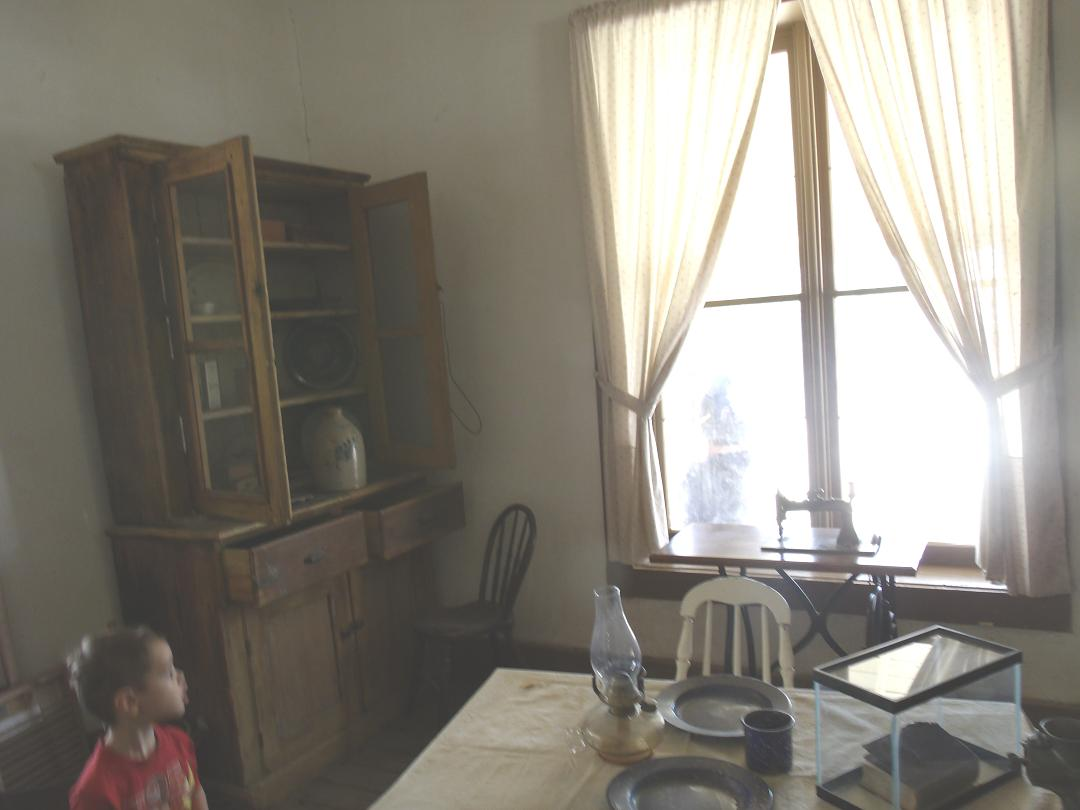
The inside of the old Adobe house, the first structure built in the Sahuaro Ranch.

== See also ==
- Glendale, Arizona
- Adobe Mountain Desert Park
- Manistee Ranch
- National Register of Historic Places listings in Maricopa County, Arizona
