= Manistee Ranch =

- U.S. National Register of Historic Places
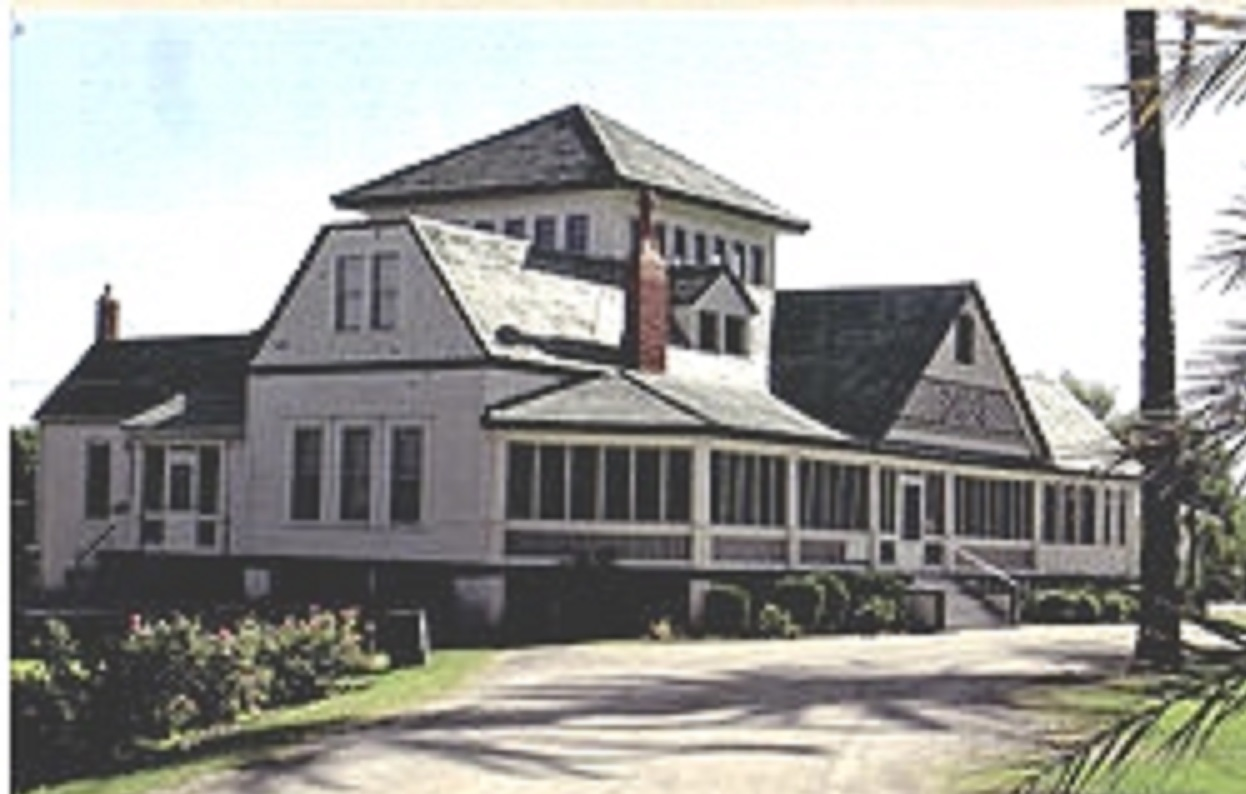
- Main mansion of the Manistee Ranch, built in 1897
- Location: 5127 W. Northern Ave., Glendale, Arizona
- Coordinates: 33.551944°N 112.17°W
- Area: 4 acres (1.6 ha)
- Built: 1897
- NRHP reference No.: 98000322
- Added to NRHP: April 9, 1998

Manistee Ranch was founded in 1897 by Herbert W. Hamilton, a native of Wisconsin. The ranch, located in the town of Glendale, Arizona, was rich in citrus fruits and dates. The ranch has all of its historical structures restored. It is administered by the Parks and Recreation Department of Glendale.

On April 9, 1998, Manistee Ranch was listed in the National Register of Historical Places.

== Ranch history ==
=== Hamilton era (1897 - 1907) ===
Herbert W. Hamilton was a wealthy lumber baron from Wisconsin who homesteaded lands in what was to become the future the City of Glendale founded by William John Murphy. What made an investment attractive was the completion of the Arizona Canal in 1885. The canal allowed 100,000 acres (40468.564 hec or 40468 hec (hectare) and 5642.2 m^{2}) of desert land to be opened up to homesteading and irrigation farming. The Homestead Act was a United States federal law that gave an applicant ownership at no cost of farmland called a "homestead."

By 1897, Hamilton had under his control 320 (129.499 hectares or 129 hec and 4994.0 m^{2}) of farmland in Glendale. He established a farm where he planted large citrus orchards and dates. Hamilton built a home for his family, unlike any of the typical Arizona farm houses of the time. It was a Queen Anne Victorian style house with a "Sky Parlor," a square windowed tower rising above the building's center.

=== Sands era (1907 - 1996) ===
In 1907, Hamilton sold the farm to Louis M. Sands, a native of Manistee, Michigan. Sands, a prominent Arizona businessman and rancher, named the farm "Manistee Ranch" after his hometown. Sands developed techniques in his ranch for rotating cattle pastures to work within the limits of the land. Besides harvesting feed for the livestock, which included cattle, sheep, horses, ducks and chickens, the farm workers also harvested dates which at the time were sold for 25¢ a pound. Over 11 different species of palm trees were planted. Currently there are some palm trees on the property which are over 100 years old.

== National Register of Historic Places ==
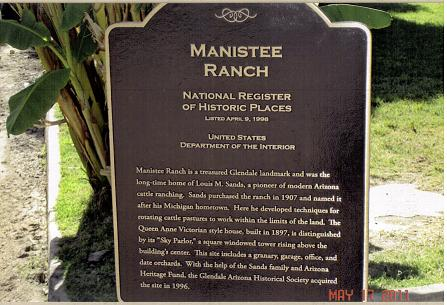
National Register of Historic Places Marker

Eventually most of the farm land, with the exception of four acres (1.61874 hectares or 1 hec and 6187.4 m^{2}), was sold to land developers. The four acres of the farm land continued under the ownership of the Sands family until 1996, when the family decided to sell the land to the Glendale Historical Society.

The Glendale Historical Society restored the historical buildings in the property which consists of a garage, office, barn and the main house. The basement of the main house has a collection of photographs and Glendale grammar school items. On the main grounds there is an exhibit of old farm equipment that was used on the ranch.

The ranch, which is located at 5127 W. Northern Ave., was listed in the National Register of Historic Places on April 9, 1998,.

== Gallery of historical Manistee Ranch ==
Historical structures in Manistee Ranch
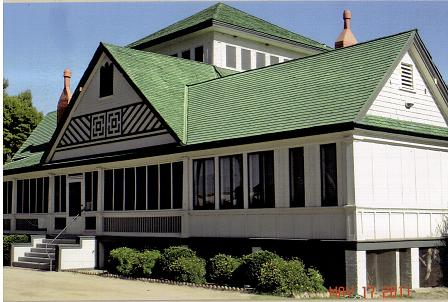
Different view of main mansion

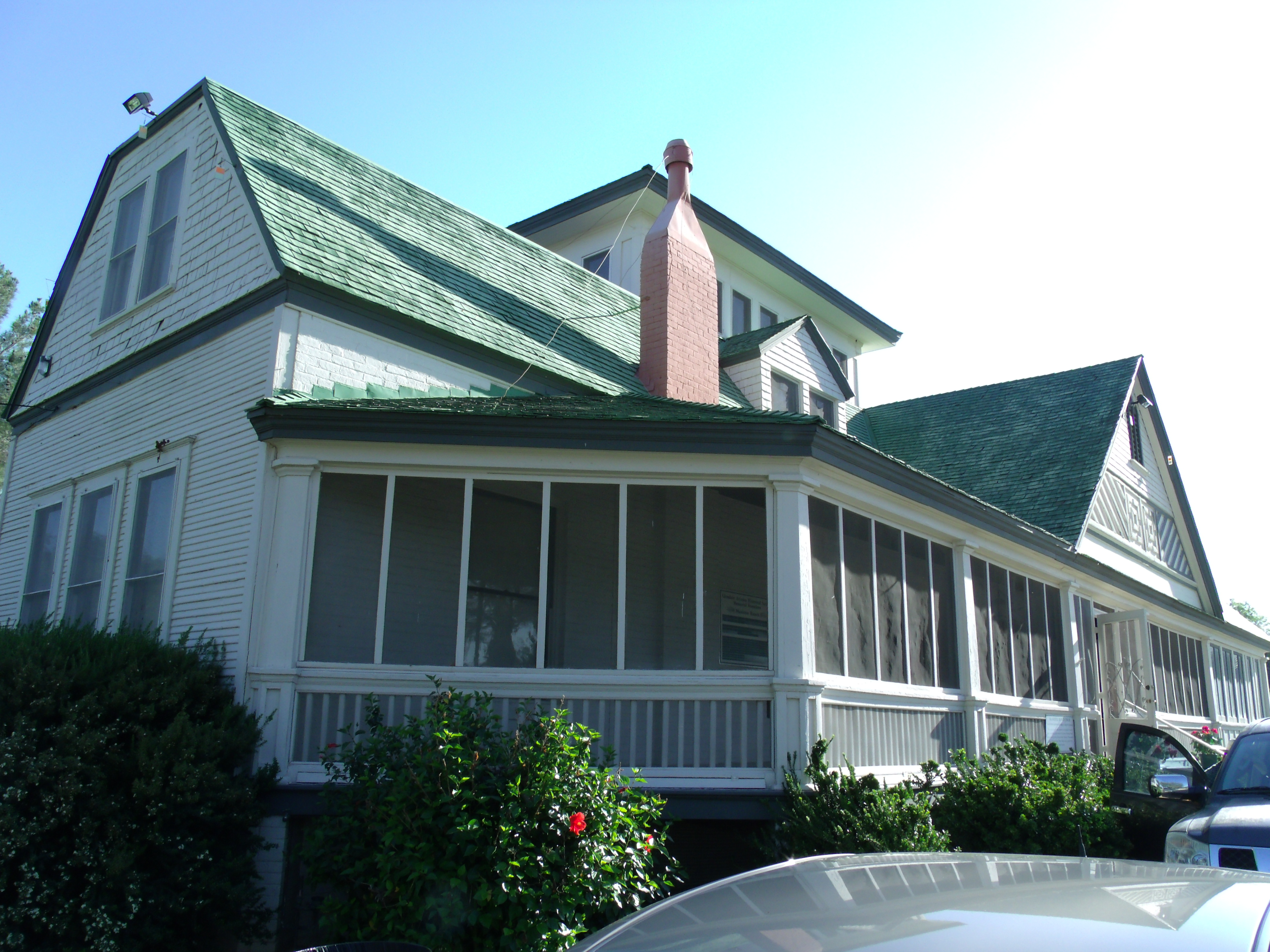
Different view of the Manistee Mansion.

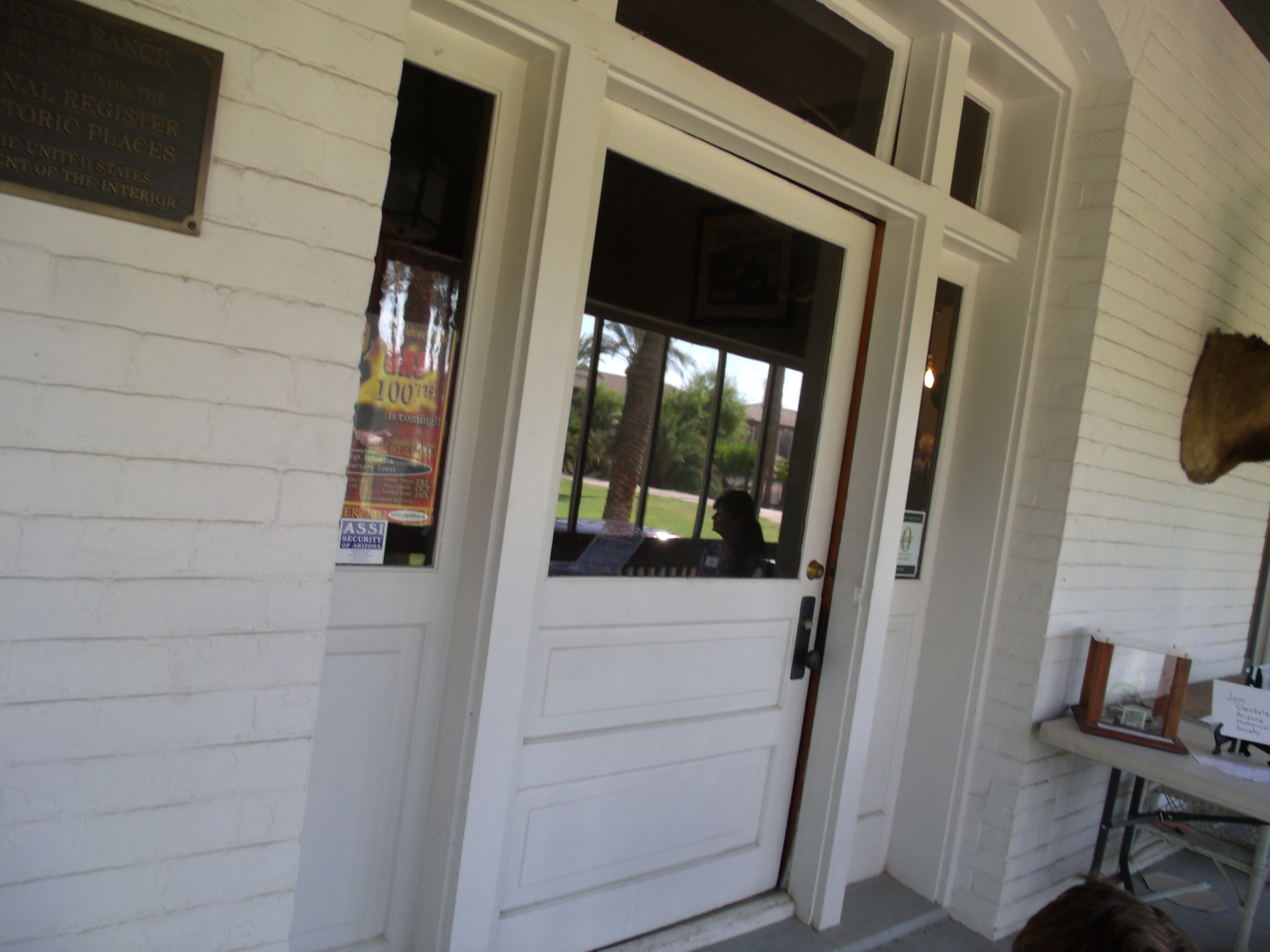
Main door and entrance of the Manistee Mansion.

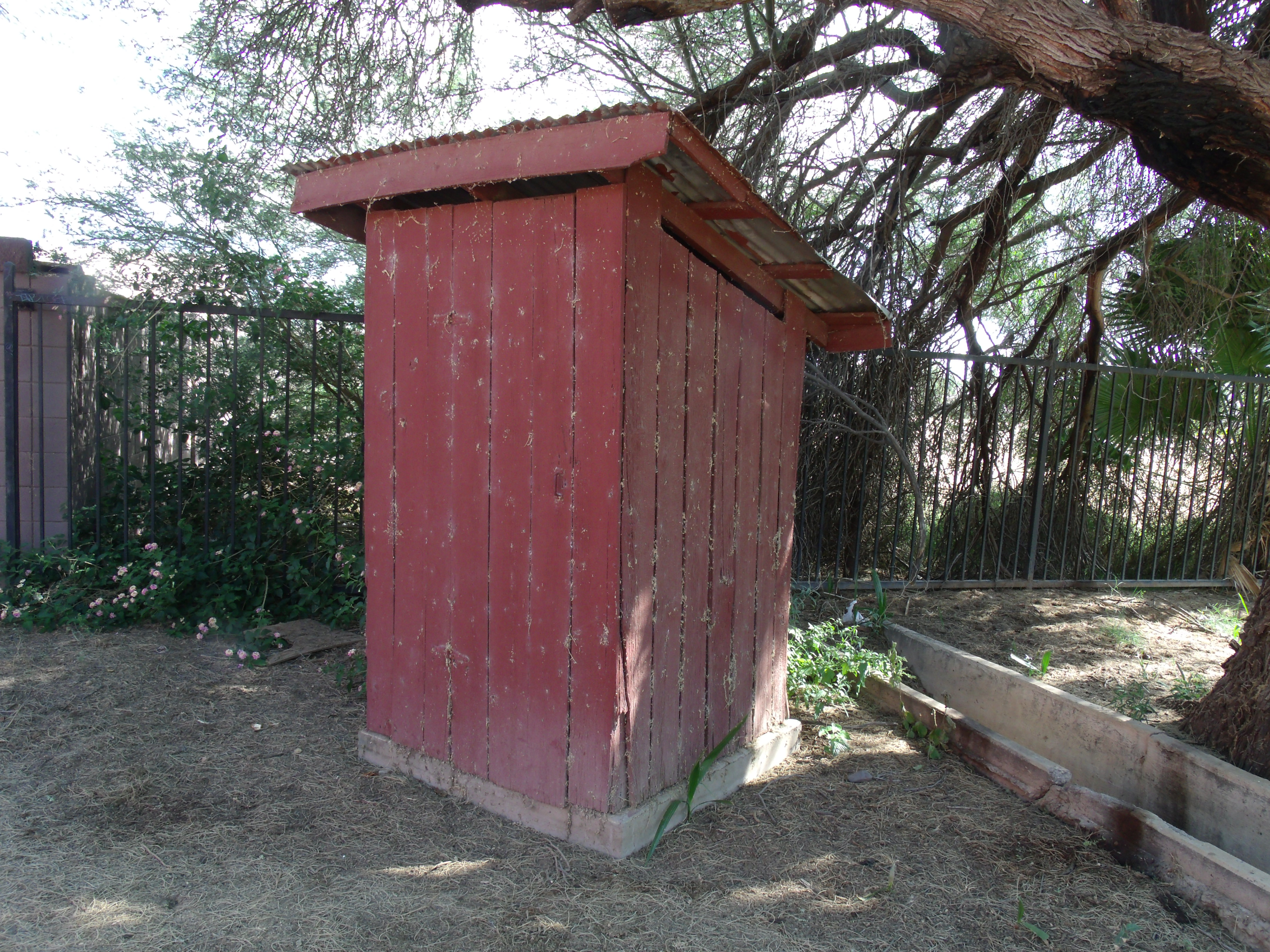
Manistee Ranch Outhouse.

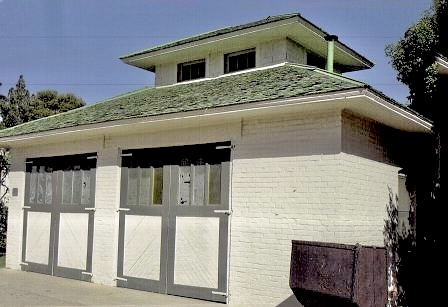
Garage in the ranch built in 1912

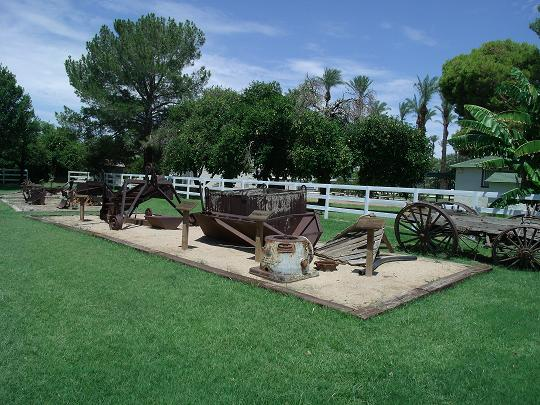
Farm equipment once used at the ranch

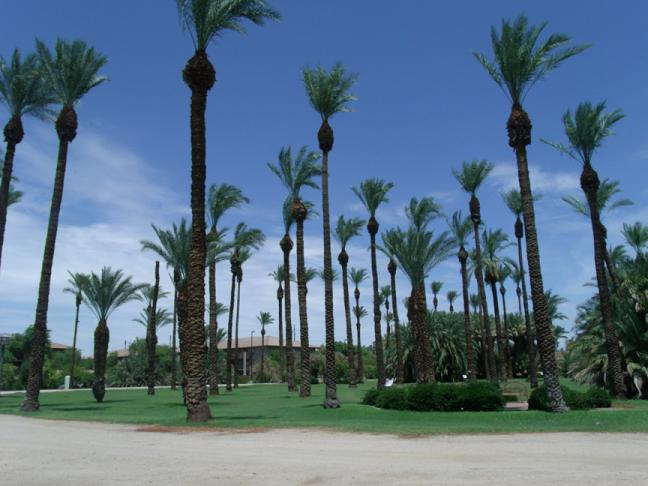
Palm trees at the ranch, some over 100 years old

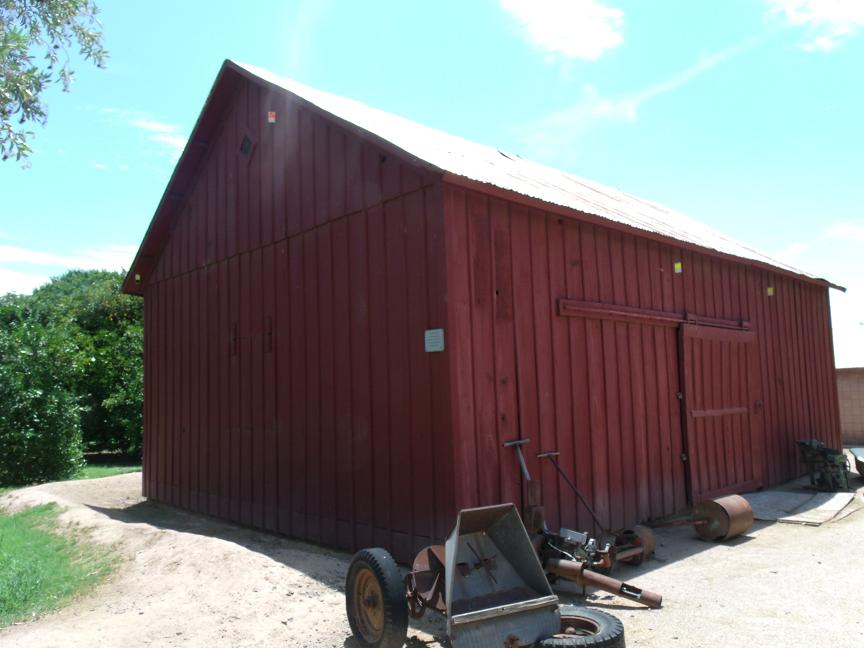
Granary Barn built in 1890

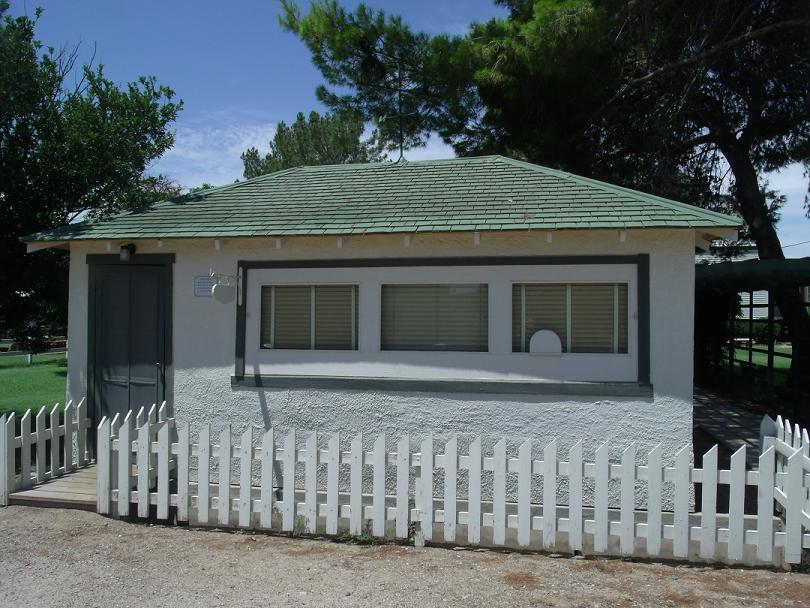
Manistee Ranch office built in 1924, and used as such by the Sands family, until 1947
Images of the 19th Century interior furnishings and decorations of the Manistee Main Mansion.
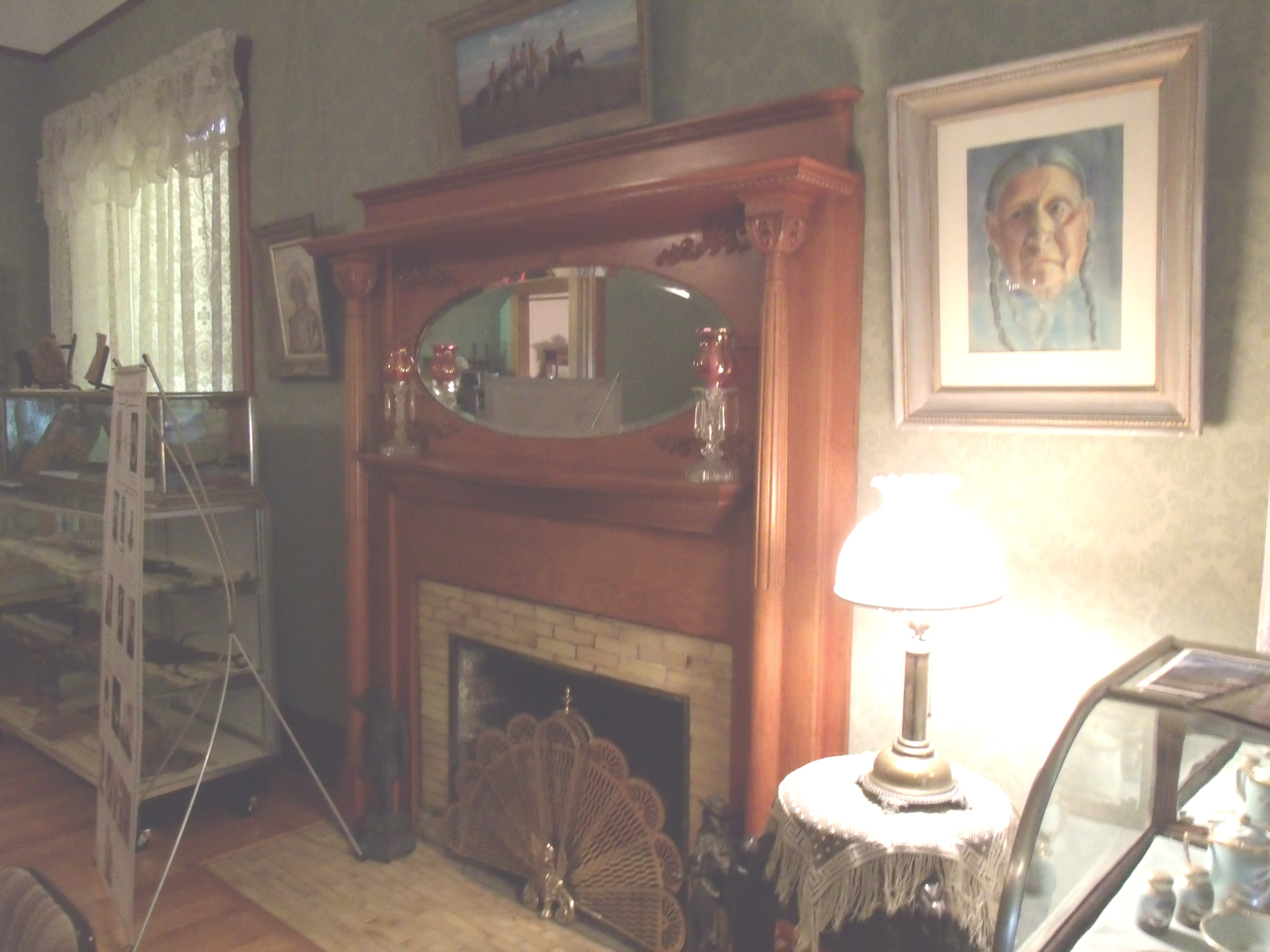
Fireplace in the living room of the Manistee Mansion.

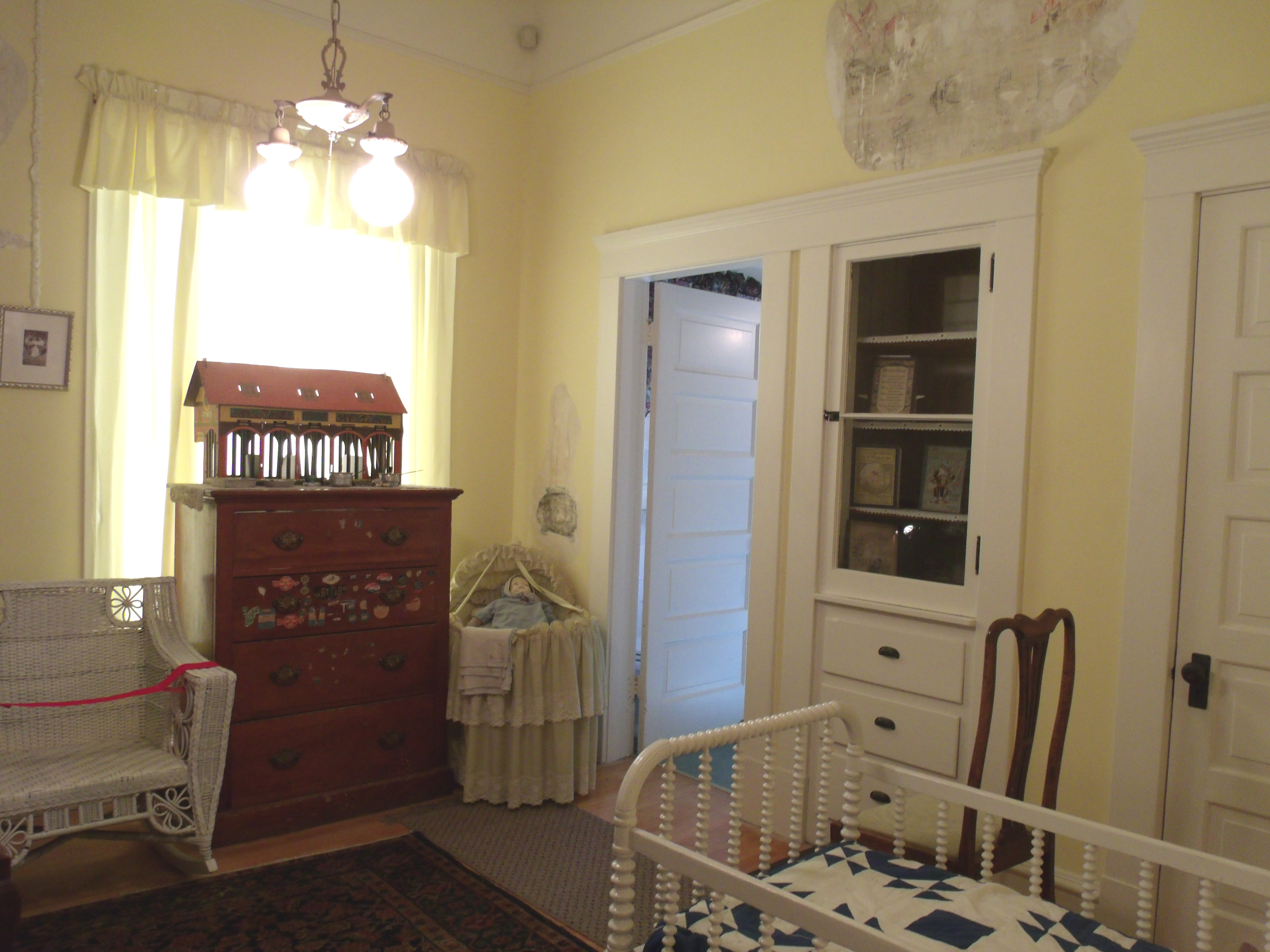
Children's room in the Manistee Mansion.

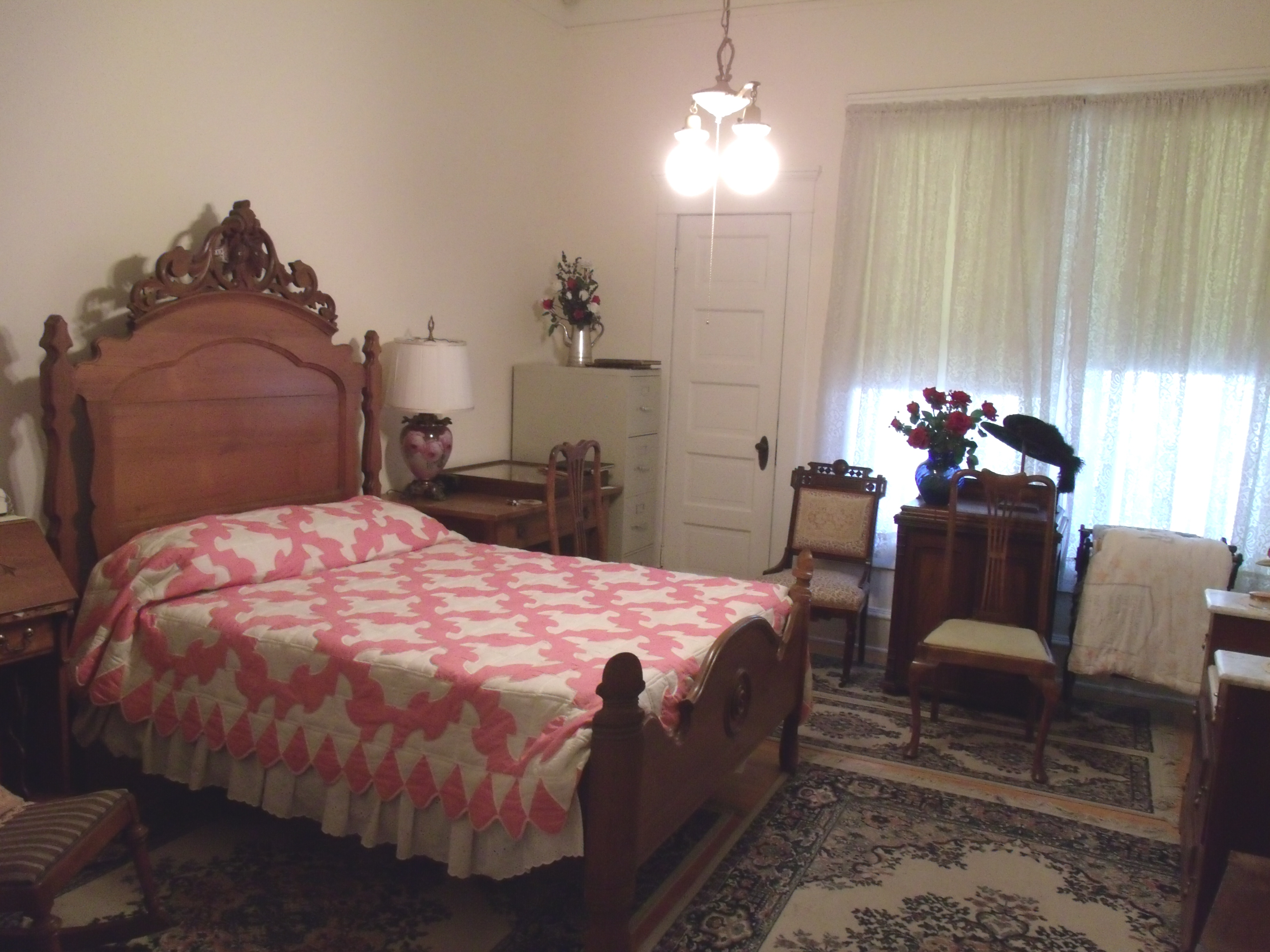
Main bedroom of the Manistee Mansion.

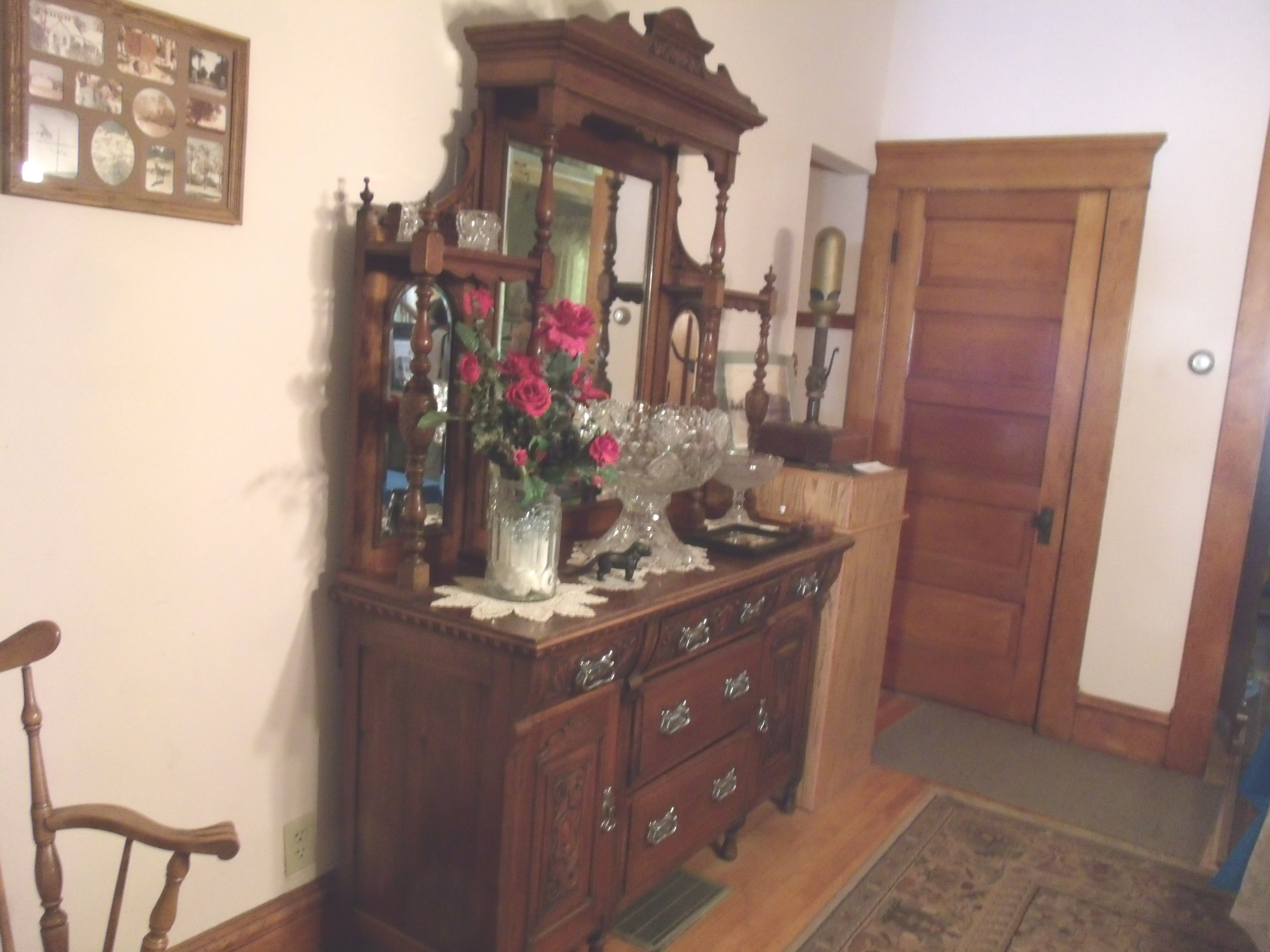
Bedroom in the first floor of the Manistee Mansion.

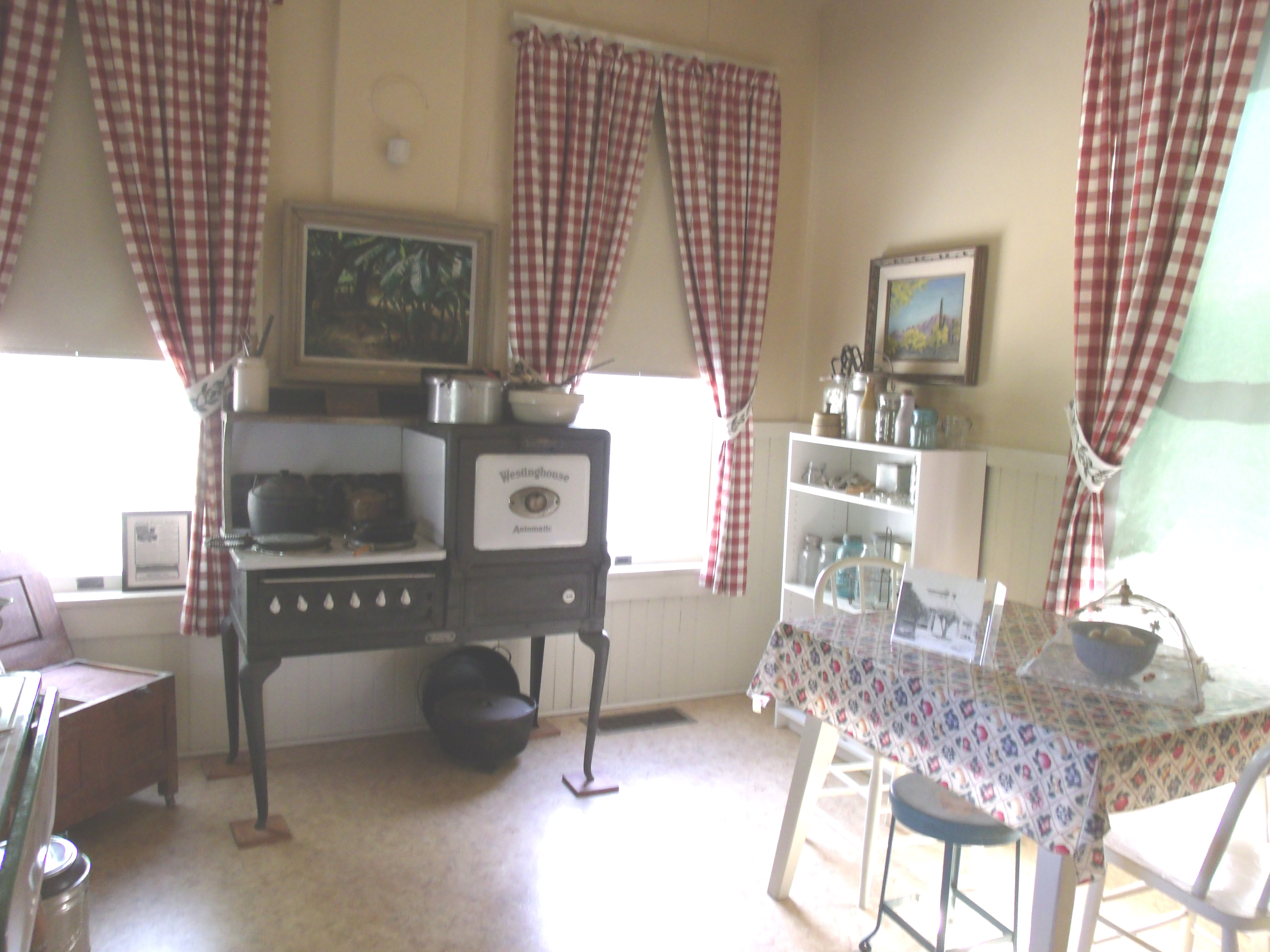
19th century kitchen of the Manistee Mansion.

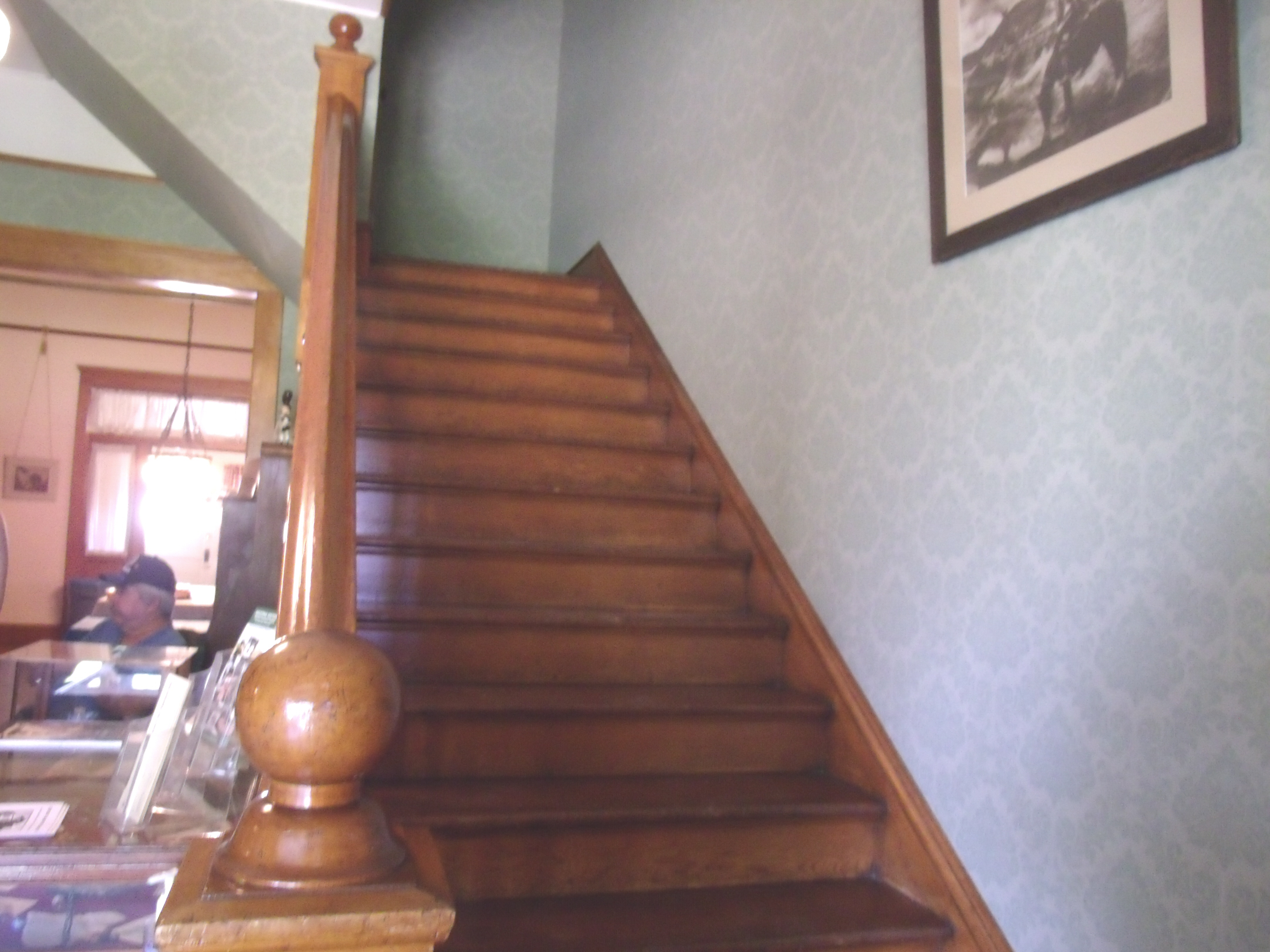
Staircase leading to the second floor of the Manistee Mansion.

== See also ==
- Glendale, Arizona
- Adobe Mountain Desert Park
- Sahuaro Ranch
- National Register of Historic Places listings in Maricopa County, Arizona
