= List of terrorist incidents in Arizona =

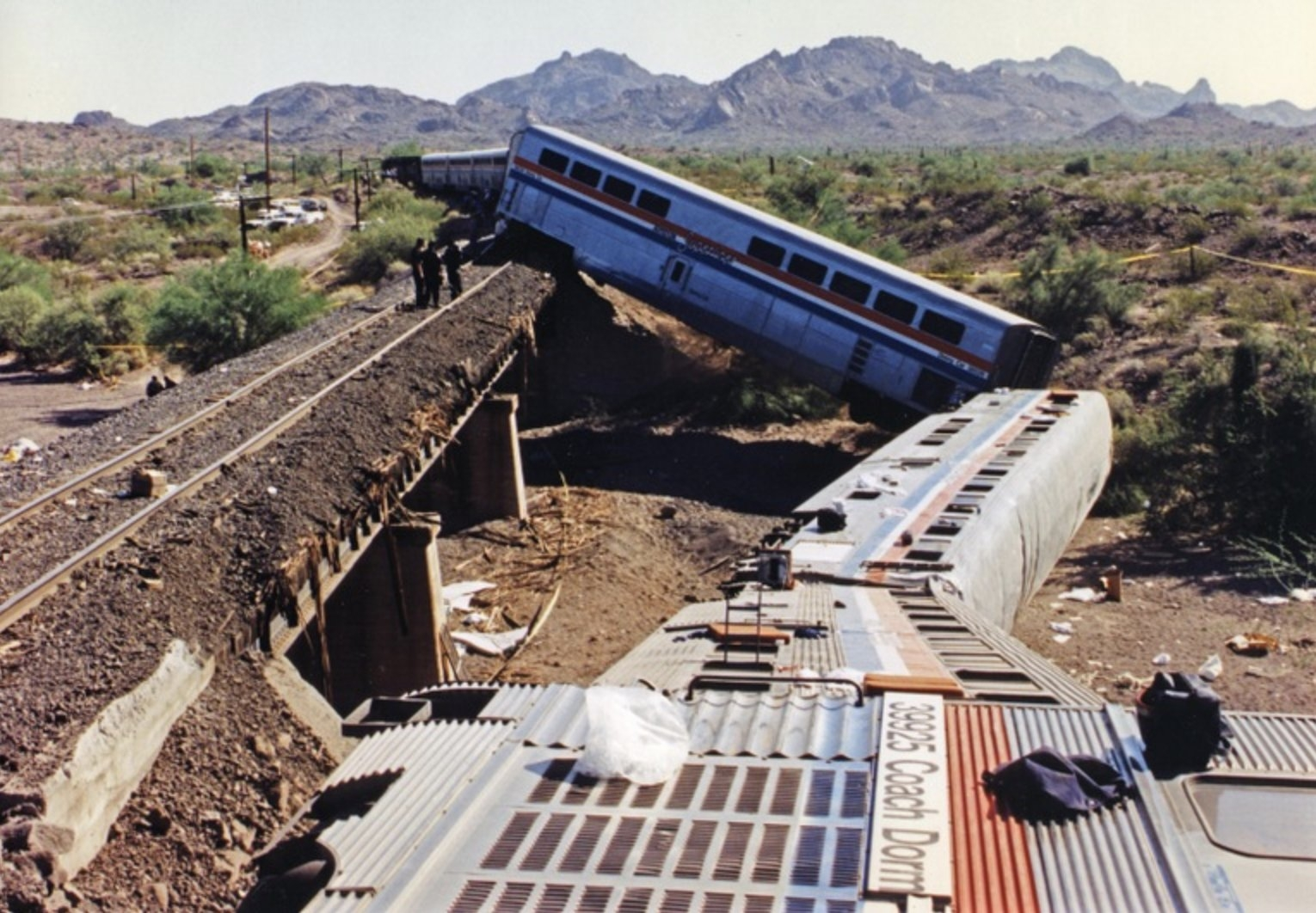
Aftermath of the 1995 Palo Verde, Arizona, derailment, a notable terrorist attack in Arizona

This is a list of terrorist incidents in Arizona.

== List ==
Article	Date	Perpetrator(s)	Type of attack	Fatalities	Injuries	Notes
Earth First! campaign	May 14, 1986	Earth First!	Ecotage	0	0	On May 14, 1986, acts of sabotage occurred at the Palo Verde Nuclear Generating Station near Phoenix, Arizona. Three incoming power lines were damaged at separate locations near the station.
EMETIC campaign in Arizona	November 7, 1987	Evan Mecham Eco-Terrorist International Conspiracy	Ecotage	0	0	Members of the Evan Mecham Eco-Terrorist International Conspiracy carried out an act of sabotage at the Fairfield Snow Bowl Ski Resort near Flagstaff, Arizona. Using propane torches, they destroyed cables that controlled the main ski lift. The attack caused no casualties, but Snow Bowl officials estimated damages at $260,000 with an additional $30,000 for security measures.
EMETIC campaign in Arizona	October 25, 1988	Evan Mecham Eco-Terrorist International Conspiracy	Ecotage	0	0	An EMETIC member used a propane torch to sabotage a cable lift at the Fairfield Snow Bowl Ski Resort near Flagstaff, Arizona. EMETIC claimed responsibility by calling into a radio station.
Animal Liberation Front campaign	April 3, 1989	Animal Liberation Front	Arson	0	0	Two buildings at the University of Arizona in Tucson were damaged by arson, causing approximately $1 million in damage. More than 1,000 research animals were released by the attackers, and the Animal Liberation Front claimed responsibility.
1995 Palo Verde, Arizona, derailment	October 9, 1995	Sons of the Gestapo	Derailment and sabotage	1	78	Amtrak's Sunset Limited was derailed by terrorists near Palo Verde, Arizona on Southern Pacific Railroad tracks. Two locomotives, and eight of twelve cars derailed, four of them falling off a trestle bridge into a dry river bed. One person was killed and 78 people were injured. After the attack, four letters were discovered at the scene, the notes criticized the Federal Bureau of Investigation and Bureau of Alcohol, Tobacco, Firearms and Explosives for there handling of the Waco Siege.
2000 Phoenix arson attacks	December 2000	Mark Warren Sands	Ecotage	0	0	In December 2000, 11 homes under construction in the Phoenix, Arizona, area were destroyed by arson. The luxury homes were being built along the North Phoenix Mountain Preserves, a 25,000-acre area designated for public recreation. The fires occurred in the evenings and targeted homes at similar stages of construction. The attacks caused more than $5 million in property damage.
Casa Grande bombing	November 29, 2012	Abdullatif Ali Aldosary	Bombing	0	0	A bomb placed at the back door of a Social Security Administration office in Casa Grande, Arizona exploded, but failed to breach the building. The perpetrator was Iraqi-born 47-year-old Abdullatif Ali Aldosary, Evidence shows he researched "terrorist bombs" and amassed appropriate materials.
2015 Phoenix freeway shootings	August 27– September 10, 2015	Unknown	Shooting	0	1	A series of eleven shootings that occurred between August 27 and September 10, 2015, along Interstate 10 and State Route 202 in Phoenix, Arizona. Each incident resulted in projectile damage to cars, and one girl was injured. The Arizona Department of Public Safety called the shootings an act of “domestic terrorism”.
2020 Westgate Entertainment District shooting	May 20, 2020	Armando Hernandez Jr.	Livestreamed shooting, sabotage, and incel terrorism	0	3	Armando Hernandez Jr., a self-proclaimed incel, opened fire at the Westgate Entertainment District, in Glendale, Arizona. Hernzandez recorded himself while shooting, he injured three people, and caused a local power outage after shooting a power transformer.

== See also ==
- List of mass shootings in Arizona
