= List of high schools in the Peoria Unified School District =

This is a list of the high schools in the Peoria Unified School District in order of completion.

== Peoria High School ==
Peoria High School

Location
- 11200 North 83rd Ave. Peoria, Arizona; United States

Information
- Established: 1923; 103 years ago
- Principal: Ms. Landa Tartaglio
- Grades: 9–12
- Enrollment: 1,624 (October 1, 2012)
- Colors: Green and Gold
- Mascot: Black Panther
- Website: Peoria High School

Peoria High School is a public secondary school located in Peoria, Arizona, United States. The high school is a part of the Peoria Unified School District. The school opened its doors in August 1919, since which it has maintained an Excelling academic status. Approximately 2,000 students are enrolled, and because of this, Peoria is a Class 4A school, as rated by the Arizona Interscholastic Association. Its mascot is the Panther. Peoria is the fifth-largest and oldest high school in the Peoria Unified School District. Peoria's sports and arts programs are referred to as the "Panther Pride". The principal is Mr. Paul Bower and vice principals include Monique Molina, Tara Willoby, and Philip Camacho.

=== Feeder schools ===
- Alta Loma Elementary (choice between Peoria and Kellis)
- Cheyenne Elementary
- Peoria Elementary
- Santa Fe Elementary (some areas attend Centennial High School)
- Sun Valley (some areas attend Kellis High School)
- Sky View Elementary

== Cactus High School ==
Cactus High School
- Glendale, Arizona; United States

Information
- Established: 1977; 49 years ago
- Principal: Debbie McKintosh
- Grades: 9–12
- Enrollment: 1,397 (October 1, 2012)
- Colors: Blue & Silver
- Mascot: Cobra
- Website: Cactus High School

Cactus High School is a public secondary school located in Glendale, Arizona, United States. The high school is a part of the Peoria Unified School District. The school opened its doors in August 1977, since which it has maintained an Excelling academic status. Approximately 1,300 students are enrolled, and because of this, Cactus is a Class 4A school as rated by the Arizona Interscholastic Association. Its mascot is the Cobra. Cactus is the smallest high school in the Peoria Unified School District, by student population. The principal is Tad Bloss and vice principals include Holly Medina, Stephanie Bend, and Brian Duguid.

=== Feeder schools ===
- Canyon Elementary
- Foothills Elementary
- Kachina Elementary
- Marshall Ranch Elementary (some areas have a choice between Cactus and Ironwood High School)
- Oakwood Elementary
- Paseo Verde Elementary (some areas attend Centennial High School)
- Pioneer Elementary

== Ironwood High School ==
Ironwood High School

Location
- 6051 West Sweetwater Avenue; Glendale, Arizona 85304; United States

Information
- Established: 1986; 40 years ago
- Principal: Russ Dunham
- Faculty: 188
- Grades: 9–12
- Enrollment: 1,996 (October 1, 2012)
- Colors: Red & Grey
- Mascot: The Ironwood Eagle
- Website: Ironwood High School

Ironwood High School is a public secondary school located in Glendale, Arizona, United States. The high school is a part of the Peoria Unified School District. The school opened its doors in August 1986, since which it has maintained an Excelling academic status. Since 2004, it has offered the IB Diploma Programme to its junior and senior year students, with a Pre-IB program for its freshman and sophomore-year students. Approximately 2,000 students are enrolled, making Ironwood a 5A Conference school as determined by the Arizona Interscholastic Association. Its mascot is the Bald Eagle. Ironwood is the second largest high school in the Peoria Unified School District by student enrollment. The principal is Russell Dunham, and vice principals are Michael Burrola, Reginna Lewis and Susan Schmit.

=== Feeder schools ===
- Desert Palms
- Desert Valley
- Copperwood
- Heritage
- Marshall Ranch (some areas have a choice between Ironwood and Cactus High School)
- Sahuaro Ranch

== Centennial High School ==
Centennial High School

Location
- 14388 N. 79th Avenue; Peoria, Arizona; United States

Information
- Established: 1990; 36 years ago
- Principal: Christine Lopezlira
- Grades: 9–12
- Enrollment: 2,128 (October 1, 2012)
- Colors: Red, White & Blue
- Mascot: Coyote
- Website: Centennial High School

Centennial High School is a public secondary school located in Peoria, Arizona, United States. The high school is a part of the Peoria Unified School District. The school opened its doors in August 1990, since which it has maintained an Excelling academic status. Approximately 2,100 students are enrolled, and because of this, Centennial is a 5A Conference school, as rated by the Arizona Interscholastic Association. Its mascot is the Arizona Coyote. Centennial is the largest high school in the Peoria Unified School District, by student population. Centennial's sports and arts programs are referred to as the "Pride of the Pack". The principal is Davita Solter and vice principals include Steve Armstrong, Christine Lopezlira, and Mike Sivertson.

=== Feeder schools ===
- Desert Harbor Elementary
- Ira Murphy Elementary (choice between Centennial and Peoria high schools)
- Oasis Elementary
- Paseo Verde Elementary (some areas attend Cactus High School)
- Santa Fe Elementary (some areas attend Peoria High School)
- Sundance Elementary

== Sunrise Mountain High School ==
Sunrise Mountain High School

Location
- 21200 N 83rd Ave; Peoria, Arizona 85382; United States

Information
- Established: 1996; 30 years ago
- Principal: Vance Setka
- Grades: 9–12
- Enrollment: 1,580 (October 1, 2012)
- Colors: Purple & Gold
- Mascot: Mustang
- Website: Sunrise Mountain High School

Sunrise Mountain High School is a public secondary school located in Peoria, Arizona, United States. The high school is a part of the Peoria Unified School District. The school opened its doors in August 1996, since which it has maintained an Excelling academic status. Approximately 1,500 students are enrolled, and because of this, Sunrise Mountain is a Class 4A school, as rated by the Arizona Interscholastic Association. Its mascot is the Mustang. Sunrise Mountain is considered the sixth largest high school in the Peoria Unified School District, by student population. Sunrise Mountain's sports and arts programs are referred to as the "Sunrise Mustangs". The principal is Dave Svorinic and vice principals include Clay Carpenter, Donna Short, and Christine Gutierrez.

=== Feeder schools ===
- Apache Elementary
- Coyote Hills Elementary (Some areas attend Liberty High School)
- Frontier Elementary

== Raymond S. Kellis High School ==
Raymond S. Kellis High School
- Glendale, Arizona; United States

Information
- Established: 2004; 22 years ago
- Principal: Jeffery Wooten
- Grades: 9–12
- Enrollment: 1,878 (October 1, 2012)
- Colors: Vegas Gold & Navy Blue
- Mascot: Cougars
- Website: Raymond S. Kellis High School

Raymond S. Kellis High School is a public secondary school located in Glendale, Arizona, United States. The high school is a part of the Peoria Unified School District. The school opened its doors in August 2004, since which it has maintained an Excelling academic status. Approximately 1,800 students are enrolled, and because of this, Kellis is a Class 5A school, as rated by the Arizona Interscholastic Association. Its mascot is the Cougar. Raymond S. Kellis is considered the fourth largest high school in the Peoria Unified School District, by student population. The principal is Jeffrey Wooten and vice principals include Tony Vining, Carly Bourland, and Landa Tartaglio.

=== Feeder Schools ===
- Alta Loma Elementary (choice between Kellis and Peoria high schools)
- Cotton Boll Elementary
- Country Meadows Elementary
- Sun Valley Elementary (some areas attend Peoria High School)

== Liberty High School ==
Liberty High School
- Peoria, Arizona; United States

Information
- Established: 2006; 20 years ago
- Principal: Sean Duguid
- Grades: 9–12
- Enrollment: 1,967 (October 1, 2012)
- Colors: Red, Black, & White
- Mascot: Lion
- Website: Liberty High School

Liberty High School is a public secondary school located in Peoria, Arizona, United States. The high school is a part of the Peoria Unified School District. The school opened its doors in August 2006, since which it has maintained an Excelling academic status. Approximately 1,600 students are enrolled, and because of this, Liberty is a Class 4A school, as rated by the Arizona Interscholastic Association. Its mascot is the African Lion. Liberty is the third largest high school in the Peoria Unified School District, by student population. Liberty's sports and arts programs are referred to as the "Liberty Lions".

=== Feeder schools ===
- Parkridge Elementary
- Lake Pleasant Elementary
- Vistancia Elementary
- Zuni Hills Elementary
- Sunset Heights Elementary
