= Central School (Peoria, Arizona) =

Historic schoolhouse in Peoria, Arizona

- U.S. National Register of Historic Places
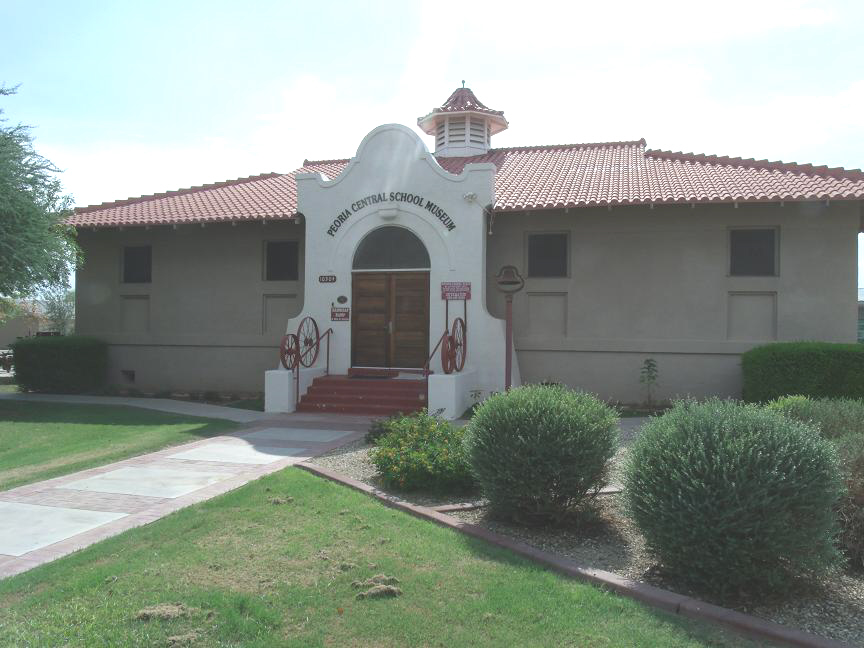

- Location within Arizona
- Location: 10304 N. 83rd Ave., Peoria, Arizona
- Coordinates: 33.57869°N 112.23800°W
- Area: less than one acre
- Built: 1906
- Architectural style: Mission/spanish Revival
- NRHP reference No.: 82002080
- Added to NRHP: May 12, 1982

The Central School, at 10304 N. 83rd Avenue, is a historic two-room school in Peoria, Arizona. It was built in 1906 for School District 11, in Mission Revival architecture and Spanish Revival architecture.

It was listed on the National Register of Historic Places in 1982.

Its two classrooms are each 39 by 25 feet (11.9 m × 7.6 m) and are separated by an 11 feet (3.4 m) wide central hall.

== History ==
Peoria Central School was built as a two room schoolhouse in 1906 to replacing the city’s one-room frame schoolhouse from 1891. The school was expanded with three additional classroom buildings in 1910, which still sit adjacent to the school today, and an auditorium building in 1918, which has since been demolished. The school was used continuously over the next seven decades, being purchased by the city in 1978.

The structure was listed on the National Register of Historic Places in 1982. It is the oldest standing schoolhouse in the Peoria School District.

The building was occupied by the Peoria Arizona Historical Society Museum, also known as the Peoria Central School Museum, which was operated by the Peoria Arizona Historical Society. The city spent $19,000 securing artifacts of the PAHS and arranging for an inventory to be completed. The Society was dissolved in 2017, due to a dispute over control between two groups of members. In July 2019, it was stated that the two groups had refused arbitration, and that the PAHS's lease with the city was terminated. The museum was closed as a result.

In the years that followed, the city has tried finding new uses for the building. In 2022, the city agreed to a deal that would allow developers to lease the building and proposed the video of the former school becoming a restaurant. In 2024, Theater Works used the school building as part of their limited engagement Old Town Ghost Tour. In December 2024, the city announced plans to evaluate the building for a rehabilitation project with the aim creating an arts and cultural center as part of a larger initiative to reinvigorate the downtown.

== See also ==
- National Register of Historic Places listings in Maricopa County, Arizona
