= 2020 Westgate Entertainment District shooting =

Terrorist attack in Glendale, Arizona

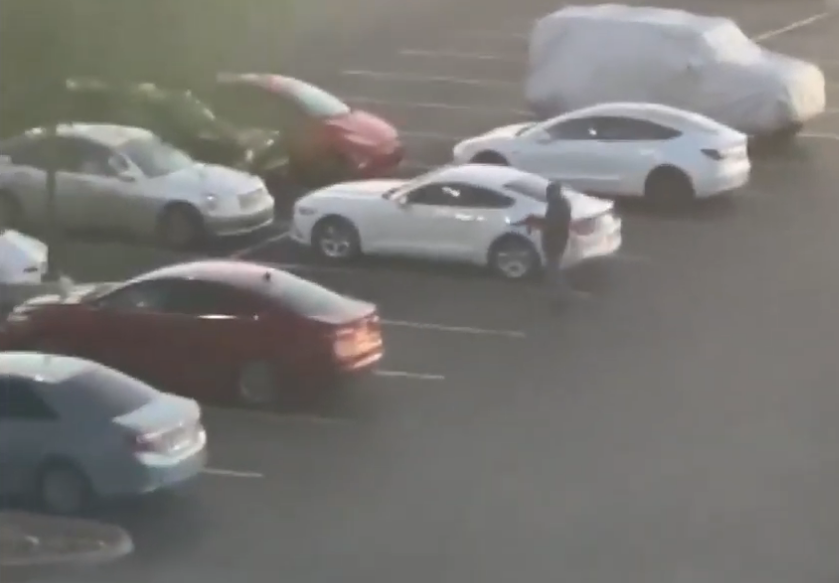
- A CCTV still of the Westgate Entertainment District shooter in the parking lot
- Location: Westgate Entertainment District, Glendale, Arizona, U.S.
- Date: May 20, 2020; 6 years ago c.7:25 p.m. – 7:33 p.m. (UTC−07:00)
- Target: Couples at the Westgate Entertainment District
- Attack type: Livestreamed shooting; electrical sabotage; incel terrorism
- Weapon: AR-15–style rifle
- Deaths: 0
- Injuries: 3
- Perpetrator: Armando Hernandez Jr.
- Defender: Michael Walker
- Motive: Incel ideology; Revenge for bullying; Rage caused by the COVID-19 pandemic
- Charges: 16 felonies
- Verdict: Guilty
- Sentence: 44 years in prison

On May 20, 2020, an armed incel terrorist attack took place in the Westgate Entertainment District, a mixed-use development in Glendale, Arizona, United States. The perpetrator, 20-year-old Armando Hernandez Jr., shot a power transformer causing a local power outage, before opening fire on bystanders, injuring three people. During the attack, Hernandez recorded himself with a cellphone. The shooting ended when his rifle malfunctioned, prompting him to surrender peacefully to responding police officers. One victim was critically injured, while two others sustained less serious injuries.

Hernandez, a 20-year-old from Peoria, Arizona who identified as an incel, told investigators he deliberately targeted couples because he felt bullied and wanted respect. In 2022, Hernandez was sentenced to 44 years in prison.

== Background ==
A few days before the shooting, Arizona's stay-at-home order, which was put in place to combat the COVID-19 pandemic, expired on May 15, 2020, and was replaced with a new order. The new order allowed restaurants and retail stores to reopen, as long as social distancing guidelines were put into place. The Westgate Entertainment District also announced that shops and restaurants were reopened.

== Shooting ==
=== Prelude ===
After finishing his construction job and getting a haircut, Hernandez returned to his home where he lived with his father and younger brother. At approximately 5 p.m., Hernandez's brother saw him loading ammunition into a magazine, but did not consider this unusual because he had previously seen Hernandez do so before trips to shoot firearms in the desert. Before leaving home, Hernandez told his family he was going to the gym, gave his brother $20, and told him to take care of himself.

Hernandez initially drove his father's white 2007 Audi to a Panda Express, but left after being told the wait would be approximately 30 minutes because of COVID-19 restrictions. He then drove toward Westgate Entertainment District, passing his former high school, Raymond S. Kellis High School, where he was bullied. After parking, he drank a large can of Foster's beer before walking toward the AMC Theatre, intending to watch a movie. When he found the theater closed because of the COVID-19 pandemic, he told police that this was a "tipping point." Hernandez saw groups of young couples gathered outside the theater which angered him, and he began viewing them as targets. He returned to his vehicle, where he drank another beer and recorded a video outlining his plans to shoot people at Westgate Entertainment District, stating, "This is society's fault." He uploaded the video to Snapchat, followed by a second video showing an AR-15–style rifle in the back seat of the vehicle. Hernandez surveyed the Westgate Entertainment District before returning to his car, where he equipped himself with a black AR-15–style rifle and loaded it with three rifle magazines to capacity. He was also wearing a camouflage face mask. He then returned toward the Westgate Entertainment District.

=== Shooting ===
Hernandez, now armed, proceeded to open fire on a power transformer outside of the Westgate Entertainment District, causing a power outage in the area. At approximately 7:25 p.m. (UTC–07:00), Hernandez wounded two people in front of a restaurant. A 309th Fighter Squadron aviation resource manager on the Luke Air Force Base, Michael Walker, who was nearby during the attack on the restaurant, told customers and staff to barricade themselves in the kitchen. When Walker saw Hernandez walk away from the front entrance of the restaurant, Walker locked the doors and closed rolling security doors from the outside.

After leaving the restaurant, Hernandez wounded a woman in the parking lot. While the injured woman was on the ground in the parking lot, Hernandez said "Society is bullshit" to which the woman responded with "I have nothing to do with that. You already shot me, dude!" After this, his rifle malfunctioned, Hernandez surrendered to Glendale Police Department officers in the parking lot without any confrontation at 7:33 p.m. (UTC–7:00). (Note: Sources:) Hernandez filmed the attack with a cellphone in his left hand while shooting with his right. During the shooting, a woman went into labor.

According to Salt River Project spokesperson Patty Garcia-Likens, the shooting caused approximately $31,000 in damage and labor costs to the utility's electrical infrastructure.

== Victims ==
The victims were a 19-year-old man who was critically wounded, a 16-year-old girl who was taken to the hospital with a non-life-threatening condition and a 30-year-old woman who did not require hospitalization.

== Perpetrator ==
The gunman was identified as Armando Hernandez Jr. (born July 1999), a 20-year-old man from Peoria, Arizona. Hernandez graduated from Raymond S. Kellis High School. Hernandez claimed that he identified as an incel and a communist. He stated in his police interview that he wanted respect for himself and was deliberately targeting couples because he was bullied.

Hernandez's behavior in the weeks preceding the shooting did not raise concerns among his family, although he frequently spoke about overthrowing the government and described himself as a "Soviet." He had expressed an interest in joining the military with his younger brother but failed the required physical examination, and his application to work as a corrections officer was rejected. His sister later told investigators that Hernandez had begun drinking heavily in the weeks before the shooting and frequently experienced blackouts. Hernandez's apparent tipping point occurred after he became enraged over the closure of an AMC Theatre and a Panda Express due to the COVID-19 pandemic.

After his arrest, he was taken to a Maricopa County, Arizona jail and charged with 16 felonies. In July 2022, he was sentenced to 44 years in prison.

== Popular culture ==
The shooting was the subject of an episode of Dark Side, a true crime documentary series produced by KPNX (Channel 12), titled Dark Side: The Westgate Shooting.

== See also ==
- 2020 Toronto machete attack, another incel terrorist attack that happened in the same year
- List of mass shootings in Arizona
