= Jason Beck =

Jason Beck may refer to:

- Chilly Gonzales (Jason Beck, born 1972), Canadian musician
- Jason Beck (American football) (born 1980), American football coach
- Jason Beck (politician) (born 1972), American politician

== See also ==
- Jason Eck (born 1977), American football coach
