= List of mayors of Peoria, Arizona =

List of Peoria, AZ mayors

Mayor of Peoria, Arizona
- Flag of Peoria, Arizona

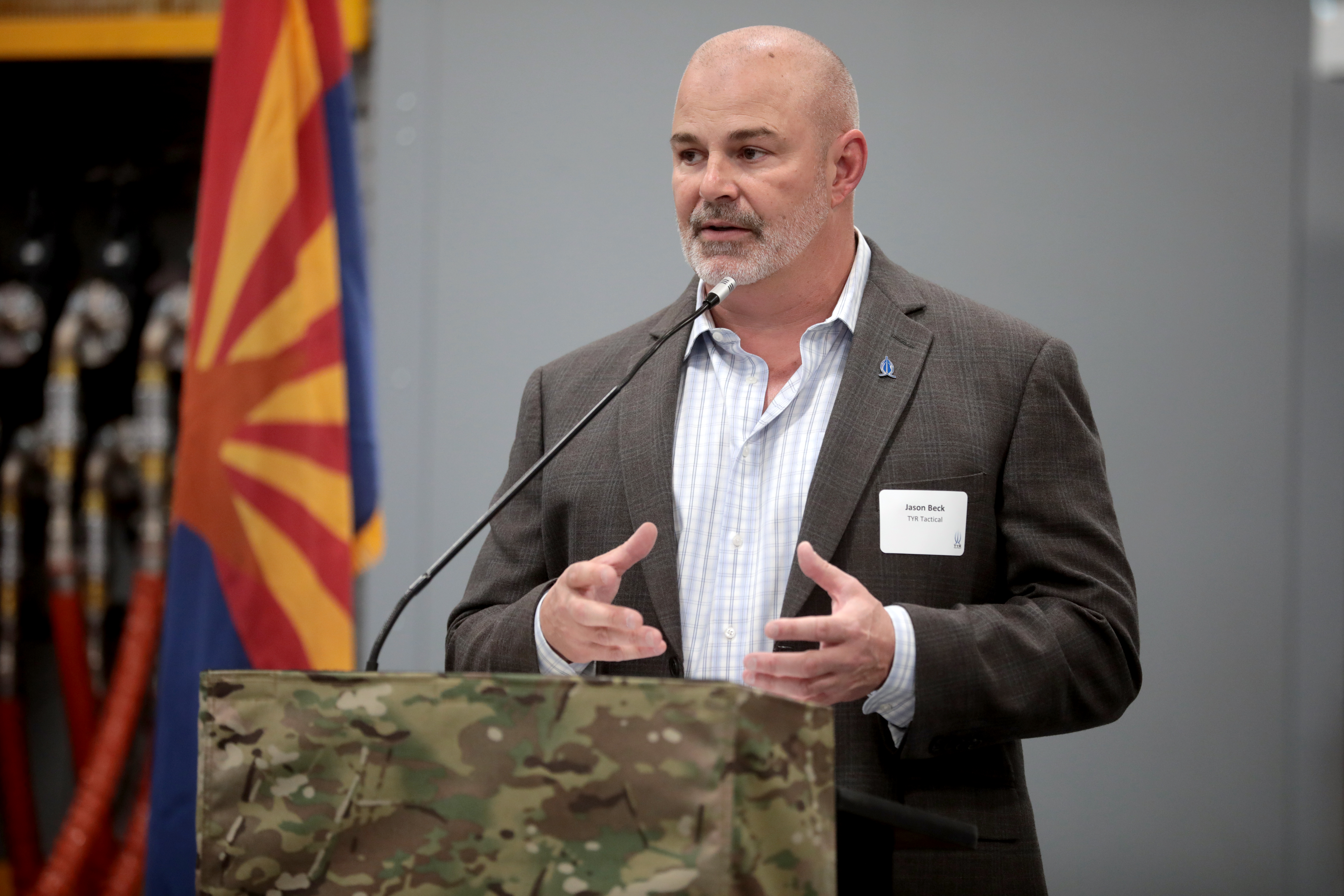
- Incumbent; Jason Beck since January 3, 2023
- Type: Mayor
- Term length: 4 years
- Formation: June 14, 1954
- First holder: Roland Pomeroy
- Website: Peoria Mayor and City Council

The following is a list of the mayors of Peoria, Arizona.

The mayor of Peoria is elected at-large for a four-year term, per an amendment to the city charter approved by voters on March 11, 1997. They can serve up to two consecutive terms, but there is no limit on non-consecutive terms.

Mayor	Term
Roland Pomeroy*	June 14, 1954 – June 14, 1956
Charles K. Vickrey*	June 14, 1955 – June 11, 1957
Conley J. Kosier*	June 11, 1957 – June 9, 1959
J. Don Wagoner*	June 9, 1959 – May 25, 1971
Orville Cook*	May 25, 1971 – May 22, 1973
Manuel M. Leyva*	May 22, 1973 – May 24, 1977
Robert K. Hensley*	May 24, 1977 – May 22, 1979
Edmund Tang*	May 22, 1979 – June 11, 1985
Ronald Travers	June 11, 1985 – June 11, 1991
Kenneth Forgia	June 11, 1991 – June 3, 1997
John Keegan	June 3, 1997 – January 8, 2007
Bob Barrett	January 8, 2007 – January 6, 2015
Cathy Carlat	January 6, 2015 – January 3, 2023
Jason Beck	January 3, 2023

* Denotes mayors elected by the city council. In November 1983, Peoria citizens voted to require the direct election of the mayor.
