= TheaterWorks (Peoria, Arizona) =

Community theater company in Peoria, Arizona, USA

Theater Works
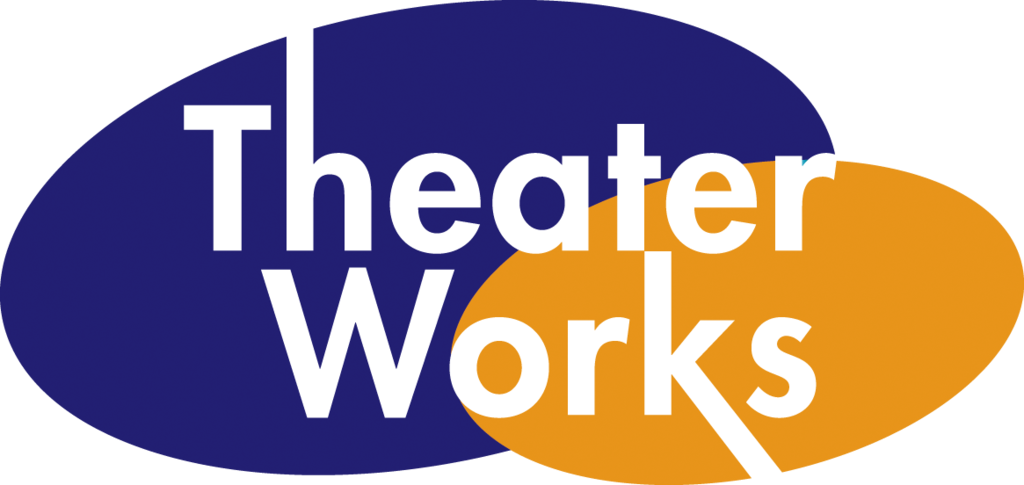
- TheaterWorks logo as of 2023.

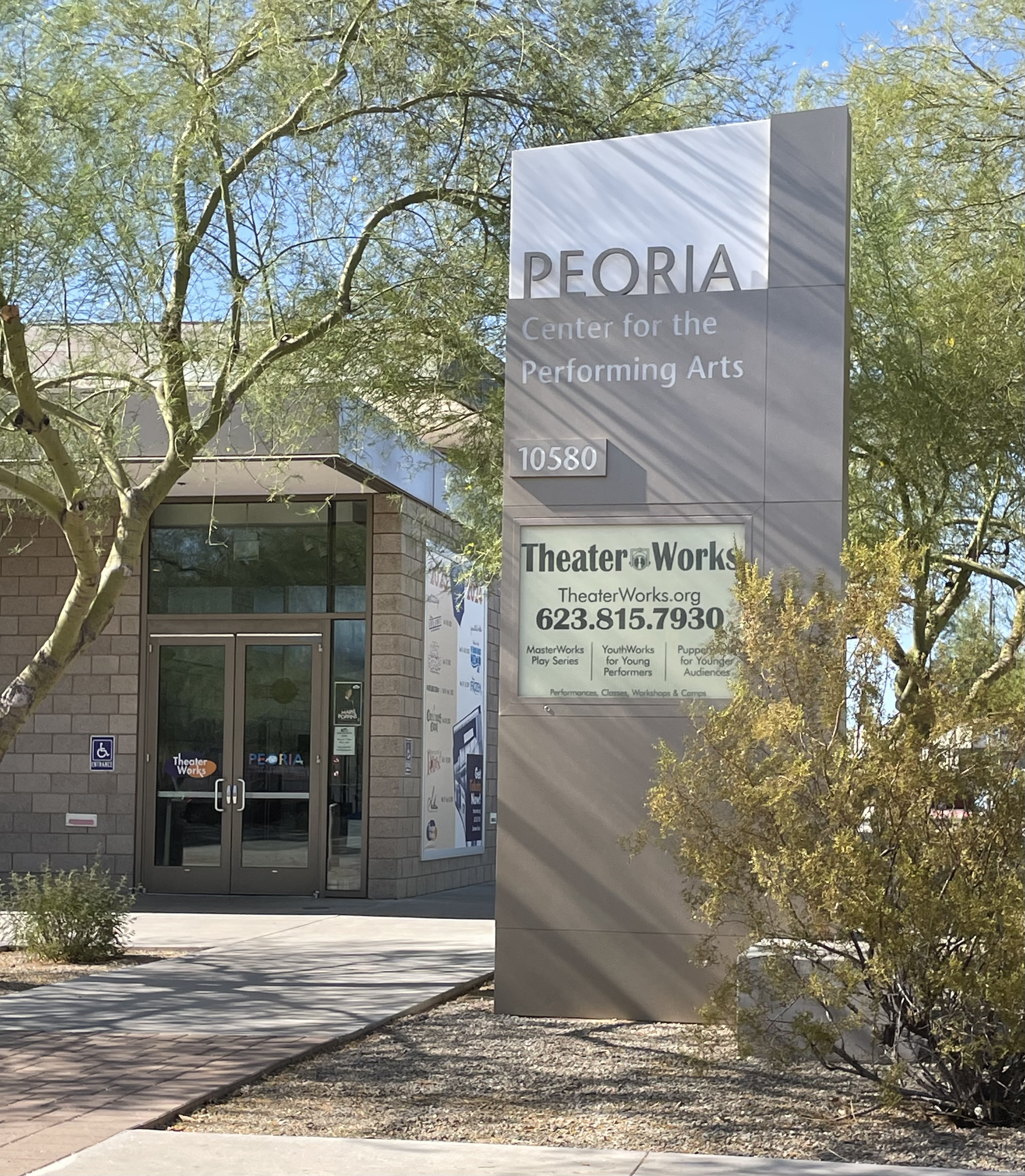
- Entrance of Theater Works
- Formation: 1986
- Founder: David Wo
- Founded at: Glendale, Arizona
- Type: Theatre company
- Legal status: Active
- Location: Peoria, Arizona, United States
- Coordinates: 33.5812879°N 112.2389755°W
- Executive Director: Chris Hamby
- Board of directors: Jill Mapstead (Chair); Jon Kras (Vice Chair); Jordann Engelbrecht (Treasurer); Lori Howard (Secretary)
- Website: theaterworks.org

TheaterWorks is a non-profit community theater company that operates out of the Peoria Center for the Performing Arts in Peoria, Arizona. The company produces more than 200 events a year for audiences of all ages, including their own productions as well as running and managing outside productions and rentals that use the arts center.

TheaterWorks has the Mary Jane Gyder Theater, a 274 seat state-of-the-art "Main Stage" theater with stadium style seating, and the Constance W. McMillin Theater, an 80 seat Black Box theater. The company also has two classrooms, a set construction shop, a costume shop, dressing rooms, and office space for the theater's staff.

== History ==
=== 1980s ===
TheaterWorks was founded in September 1986 as a non-profit community theater. Around this time, people believed that the northwest valley of the Phoenix metropolitan area was in need of a community theater. David Wo was the driving force behind the start of TheaterWorks and would be named the artistic director and executive producer of the new theater company.

In December 1986, the company leased a building that used to be a feed store at 67th Avenue and Thunderbird Road in Glendale. They installed a stage and risers of seating, and elected a board of directors to provide oversight for the various aspects of production and programs that the company had planned.

TheaterWorks opened with their first show, The Unsinkable Molly Brown, on February 6, 1987. The company put on six more shows that season.

=== 1990s ===
In 1990, David Wo began looking for a location for a second TheaterWorks theater. Wo looked at locations in Downtown Glendale and Sun City. The Sun City location, an old movie theater, came close to a finalized deal between Wo and the property owner but ultimately fell through likely to the necessary renovation costs. Following the failed deal in Sun City, Wo began looking at Downtown Glendale again, working with the city council to gain financial backing. Despite years of talks between the theater and the city of Glendale no agreement was ever reached and TheaterWorks' lease at their "barn on Thunderbird" expired. The company had to move further west to 99th Avenue and Peoria Avenue in Peoria.

In February 1997, the city of Surprise offered the theater company free use land for a permanent theater location as part the city's proposed cultural center. The location of this cultural center would have been at 115th Avenue and Bell Road, between Sun City and Sun City West. TheaterWorks was concerned that with the location the theater may become seen as a Sun City theater primarily geared toward seniors. In June, the theater decided to decline Surprise's offer and bought land at 91st Avenue and Thunderbird Road to construct their own theater facility. The proposed $2 million facility would have two theaters, a main stage auditorium and a black box theater, as well as classrooms for the company's numerous educational programs. On September 18, 1997, David Wo collapsed and died at the theater from cardiac arrest. Gregory Jaye and Julia Thomson took over as heads of the theater to finish out the 97-98 season.

In June 1998, following the end of the theater's 97-98 season, it was announced that TheaterWorks was no longer pursuing the new theater project. Only a few thousand dollars had been raised prior to David Wo's death and Julia Thomson did not want to overwhelm the theater company with intensive fundraising following the death.

=== 2000s ===
In 2000, the city of Peoria put Proposition 402 on the ballot, asking Peoria citizens to vote on whether or not the city should invest in a new performing arts center. TheaterWorks was singled out by the city as a favorable tenant for the proposed theater due to its existing revenues and reputation. Ultimately, Proposition 402 would fail with only 41% of voters in favor of the community arts center.

TheaterWorks and the city of Peoria announced in 2001 that they would be moving forward with plans to create a cultural and performing arts center following the passing of proposition 304, a second initiative to get the citizens' approval in 2001 that passed. Then Peoria mayor, John Keegan, said that he would like to see more development for artistic and cultural centers in Peoria, particularly for redeveloping the Old Town area. In fall 2001, Scott Campbell took over as artistic director.

In early 2002, David Hock took over as managing director of the theater before leaving after three months to pursue another path. Ben Tyler then took over as managing director of TheaterWorks after being the cofounder and operator of Mill Avenue Theater in Tempe, and artistic director of Desert Foothills Theater in Carefree.

In 2003, TheaterWorks and the city of Peoria were still finalizing planning to build the Peoria Center for the Performing Arts, primarily raising money. That same year Jack Lytle took over the reins as the theater's Executive Director. The first hurdle the theater had to clear was raising $200,000 by March 2004, then construction would commence. TheaterWorks ran into several obstacles in meeting this goal, the first of which was being shut down by the Peoria fire marshal in March for several severe fire hazards. The cost to fix the necessary issues in order to reopen was estimated at about $100,000. The community rallied around the theater with several local companies volunteering supplies and services to the theater and the city of Peoria giving $25,000 in discretionary funds to the theater as needed. During this time the theater company moved operations to the Lakes Club in Sun City, which placed yet another financial burden on the theater. The theater leased the Lakes Club for $10,000. The deadline to raise the $200,000 was pushed back to December 2004. TheaterWorks was able to raise the necessary funds with a week left in November 2004, officially starting the process to get the new performing arts facility build in Old Town Peoria.

A groundbreaking ceremony was held in December 2005, beginning work on the half decade plan for the new performing arts center, and a new home for TheaterWorks.

TheaterWorks held their first show in the new facility, Tea for Three, on February 10, 2007.

=== 2010s ===
In 2012 Daniel Schay took over as Executive Director of the company. Schay had previously been president of Sedona Cultural Park, a 5,500 seat concert venue, and Executive Director of Phoenix Theatre.

Following the sudden death of Schay in 2016, Chris Hamby and Cate Hinkle became artistic director and managing director, respectively. The two split the duties of Executive Director with Hamby overseeing the artistic side of the role. Hinkle oversaw the marketing, development, and fundraising aspects of the theater. Hamby had previously been the education and outreach director for TheaterWorks, as well as a co-founder and director of the short-lived Vagabond Youth Theater in Avondale from 1998 until 2001. Hinkle had been working as the theater’s director of marketing and development, previously holding the same role at the Phoenix Boys Choir and a marketing position at Herberger Theater Center.

=== 2020s ===
After cancelling the rest of their season in mid-March due to the COVID-19 pandemic, the theater closed its doors and furloughed most of its employees, unsure of when they could re-open or how to do so, safely. Over the summer, as some restrictions in the state and city began to be lifted, members of the production team began brainstorming ways to perform while still keeping safety recommendations in mind. The result was Curiouser & Curiouser, an original immersive experience based on Alice's Adventures in Wonderland. The show took patrons through the entire building in small groups, following the White Rabbit as they travelled through many scenes of Wonderland. The show’s success led to two spinoff shows from the theater. A Curiouser Nutcracker, a cross between the original and The Nutcracker that opened on November 27, 2020, but did not finish its run due to an increase in COVID-19 numbers at the time. On June 3, 2021 TheaterWorks opened Curiouser & Curiouser Too, a reworking of the original show that offered an update on the world from the first iteration with a slightly darker tone. The production was also the subject of the film Down the Rabbit Hole: the Arts, the Pandemic, & the Curiouser Immersive Project, which won a 2024 Rocky Mountain Emmy for Long Form Content (Longer Than 15 Minutes).

In June 2022, Cate Hinkle announced her departure from the theater with Chris Hamby taking over most of her role and given the title Executive Director of TheaterWorks.

== Educational Programs ==
A major emphasis for the theater is educational programs for youth. The theater has also offered educational experiences for teens, adults, and seniors.

These programs include:

Theater Alive (formerly Kids Alive) - an Up With People style group performing upbeat music on themes such as world peace and self-esteem. In the early run of Kids Alive, the performers would tour, performing in other theaters across the country and sometimes other countries. Today the program is more focused on theater.

WonderWorks - a theatrical group performing for children.

Summer Camps - one-to-three week-long summer musical theater workshops, each offering children the opportunity to learn and perform in a showcase.

Theater Classes - six-to-eight week classes in the performing arts, covering topics like movement, sings, acting, and dancing.

YouthWorks - numerous productions that are a part of the theater's regular season but all of the performers are under the age of 18.

AdaptiveWorks - a program designed for actors with physical and cognitive disabilities started in 2017. The program has not returned since 2019.
