= List of mass shootings in Arizona =

This is a list of mass shootings in Arizona. It includes notable mass shootings in Arizona that have a Wikipedia article on the shooting, perpetrator, or the victims.

== Criteria ==
- Mass Shooting Tracker: Defines "mass shooting" as "an incident where four or more people are shot in a single shooting spree," including the perpetrator or police shootings of civilians around the perpetrator, and irrespective of the motive of the perpetrator or the location of the murders.
- Must have a Wikipedia article on the killing, the perpetrator, or a victim.

== List ==
Article	Date	Perpetrator	Deaths	Injuries	References
1966 Rose-Mar College of Beauty shooting	November 12, 1966	Robert Benjamin Smith	5	2	
Waddell Buddhist temple shooting	August 10, 1991	Johnathan Doody and Allesandro Garcia	9	0	
Mass murder of the Luna family	September 14, 1993	Richard Djerf	4	1 (Note: Including the perpetrator)	
2002 University of Arizona shooting	October 28, 2002	Robert Flores	4 (Note: Including the perpetrator)	0	
2011 Tucson shooting	January 8, 2011	Jared Lee Loughner	6	15 (Note: Including the perpetrator)	
2012 Gilbert shooting	May 2, 2012	J. T. Ready	5 (Note: Including the perpetrator)	0	
2015 Northern Arizona University shooting	October 9, 2015	Steven Edward Jones	1	3	
2018 Scottsdale shootings	May 30–June 4, 2018	Dwight Lamon Jones	7 (Note: Including the perpetrator)	0	
2020 Westgate Entertainment District shooting (Note: Despite having less than 4 casualties, VICE described the 2020 Westgate Entertainment District shooting as a mass shooting.)	May 20, 2020	Armando Hernandez Jr.	0	3	
2022 Phoenix shooting	August 22, 2022	Isaiah Steven Williams	3 (Note: Including the perpetrator)	5	

== See also ==
- 2026 Twin Falls shooting – perpetrator has connections to Arizona
