= John C. Keegan =

American politician

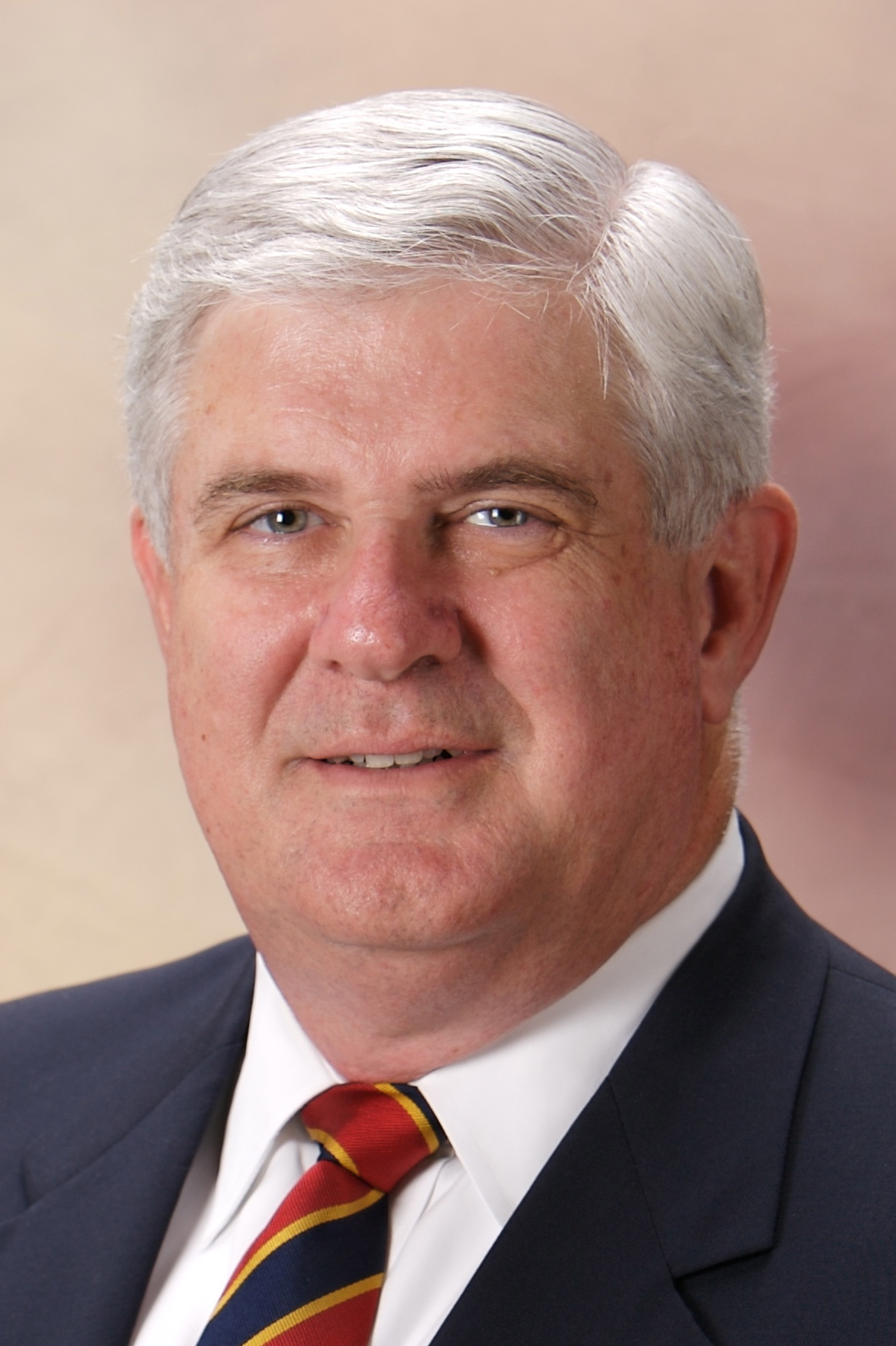

Judge of Arizona Justice Court (retired)
- In office 2007 - 2010

Mayor of Peoria
- In office June 3, 1997 – January 8, 2007
- Preceded by: Kenneth Forgia
- Succeeded by: Bob Barrett

Personal details
- Born: John Charles Keegan; February 21, 1952 (age 74) Tempe, Arizona
- Party: Republican
- Spouse: Lisa Graham Keegan

John Charles Keegan is a retired judge of the Justice Court in Maricopa County, Arizona. He was Mayor of Peoria, Arizona from June 1997 to January 2007. Keegan served as a commissioned officer in both the U.S. Army and U.S. Navy and held elected office in all three branches of government. While on the bench, he chaired the Professional Standards Committee and was an outspoken advocate for increased accountability of judges. Additionally, Judge Keegan was a juvenile hearing officer and actively involved in issues of underage drinking, truancy, and other youth offenses.

== Political career ==
While he was mayor, Keegan initiated major changes to land use planning, environmental protection, cultural opportunities, and economic development in the city. During this time, the population of Peoria more than doubled, and the city was consistently ranked as one of the fastest-growing cities in the United States.

To meet the need of explosive growth in Peoria, Keegan created the first public-private partnership to build a public charter school to increase classroom capacity. At his direction, Peoria instituted an ethics committee for elected officials as well as appointed officers. A program to confiscate illegal weapons on campuses initiated by Mayor Keegan led to reduced violence and increased safety in local schools. In 1999 he was given the Defender of Decency Award by Americans for Decency for his efforts to restrict sexually oriented businesses in the city. Of particular note was the creation of the Peoria Center for the Performing Arts and the Peoria Mountain Park Preserve. Property taxes were lowered four times. In 2005 and early 2006 Keegan was instrumental in raising over $400,000 in equipment, supplies, and cash to assist the City of Long Beach, Mississippi recover from Hurricane Katrina.

Keegan led a successful regional effort of local governments and businesses to protect Luke Air Force Base from encroachment and potential closure through the Base Realignment and Closure or BRAC process by lobbying for state and federal legislation as well as local zoning protection for the base. His meetings with the Secretary of Defense, Secretary of the Air Force, Governor of Arizona, White House staff and congressional leaders ultimately were successful. The Maricopa Association of Governments recognized Keegan in 2001 with the Desert Peaks Award for Distinguished Service for his commitment to regional cooperation. Keegan was instrumental in having the Challenger Center in Peoria, an aerospace and science education organization, officially designated as an affiliate of the Smithsonian Institution in Washington, D.C.; one of only two such designations in the state of Arizona. In 2005 he led a statewide effort to expand access to the Pentagon Channel for service members in Arizona.

In 1991 to 1995, Keegan served two terms in the Arizona House of Representatives. He was appointed to fill a vacancy created by the Azscam ethics scandal. In the legislature, Keegan chaired the Criminal Justice Appropriations Subcommittee, was Vice Chairman of the Judiciary Committee, and was the first Chairman of the Veterans and Military Affairs Committee. He was an active member of several state and local organizations dealing with juvenile crime and formed a collation of prosecutors, police agencies, and school officials to develop legislation and other solutions to the issue. As a member of the House government committee, he was a leading advocate for reform. In 1994 a political opponent accused him of campaign irregularities. No charges were ever brought, although he withdrew from the race for unrelated reasons. The officials charged with conducting the investigation into the allegations, Grant Woods, Arizona Attorney General, and Jane Dee Hull, Arizona Secretary of State and later governor, subsequently endorsed Keegan in his election for Mayor of Peoria.

In 2002, he was a Republican candidate for the United States Congress from the second congressional district in Arizona. Senator John McCain was the chairman of Keegan's congressional campaign committee. In 1996 John Keegan was elected to the Maricopa County Charter Government Commission. The commission was an unsuccessful attempt to modernize the 19th century governance model for the county.

== Earlier career ==
Professionally he was a consulting engineer and small business owner, and is the former president of the Arizona Society of Professional Engineers.

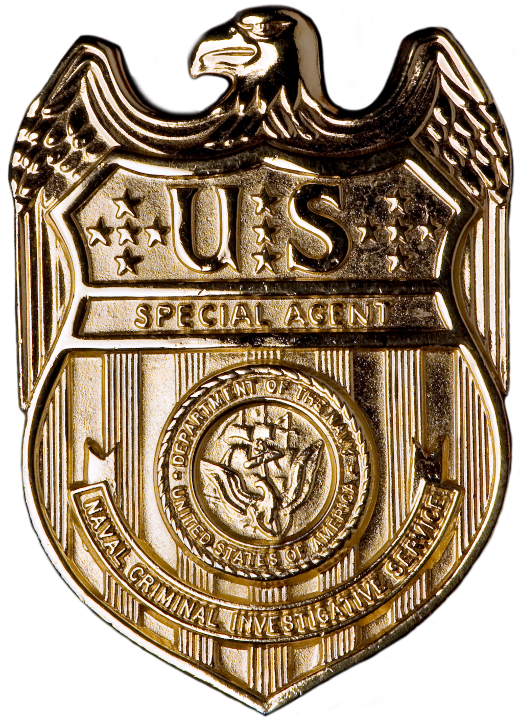
NCIS badge

He served on active duty in both the US Army and the US Navy and retired with the rank of Commander USN. Most of his career was in special operations and counterintelligence. He served on active duty during the Vietnam War and Gulf War in the United States. His overseas service was during peace time. In his last several assignments, he was a special agent with the Naval Criminal Investigation Service (NCIS).

Judge Keegan received his undergraduate education at the United States Military Academy, West Point, New York, and Arizona State University, Tempe, Arizona and has a master's degree in planning from the Defense Intelligence Agency graduate program. He completed post-graduate studies in strategic planning at the Naval War College, Newport, Rhode Island, and in public policy at the Kennedy School of Government at Harvard University. He is a graduate of the Department of Homeland Security's Federal Law Enforcement Training Center, in Georgia.

== Personal information ==
John Keegan's mountain howitzer firing

In 2005, the Boy Scouts of America presented John Keegan with the Silver Beaver Award and in 2013 the Silver Antelope Award for "distinguished service to youth." In 2008 he was elected president of the Grand Canyon Council of the Boy Scouts of America, which serves approximately 80,000 youth and adult volunteers throughout Arizona. In this capacity, he has been instrumental in establishing the first Boy Scout troop inside a juvenile correctional facility in the United States. Subsequently, he served scouting as an area president and regional Vice President for Outdoor Adventure. He received the Outstanding Eagle Scout Award in 2013 and the Distinguished Eagle Scout Award in 2016 and is one of only 16 Eagle Scouts in history to receive both. He is a life member of the National Eagle Scout Association, and a former churchwarden of the Episcopal Church and is a member of the Peoria Masonic lodge. His hobbies include firing his full scale American Civil War mountain howitzer.

Keegan has provided political commentary to local and national radio and television networks such as PBS and NPR as well as commercial networks. He has had articles published by the U.S. Department of Defense, the U.S. Naval Institute magazine Proceedings, and The Artilleryman magazine. Since 1998, he has often written articles on state and local issues for the Arizona Republic, and numerous local publications.

Keegan's family first came to Arizona during the American Civil War. His grandfather, William Keegan and his great-grandfather, John J. Keegan were both mayors of Globe, Arizona. Additionally, John J. Keegan was a member of Arizona's constitutional convention in 1910.

Judge Keegan's courtroom displayed a large sign with the preamble to the Arizona Constitution:

We the people of the State of Arizona, grateful to Almighty God for our liberties, do ordain this Constitution.

In 2012 Keegan was inducted by Governor Jan Brewer into the Arizona Veteran's Hall of Fame which "recognizes and honors Arizona veterans who have honorably served their country through military service and who have continued to serve and inspire their fellow citizens with deeds and accomplishments throughout their lifetime."

John Keegan is married to Lisa Graham Keegan, and they have five children.

== See also ==
- List of Eagle Scouts (Boy Scouts of America)
- List of Freemasons (E–Z)
