= Liberty High School (Peoria, Arizona) =

Location
- 9621 W. Speckled Gecko Dr., Peoria, Arizona, United States of America; 33°41′08″N 112°15′56″W

Information
- Type: Public secondary
- Motto: "Roaring Our Way to Success"
- Established: 2006
- Principal: Aaron Bagwell
- Teaching staff: 115.15 (FTE)
- Enrollment: 2,562 (2023-2024)
- Student to teacher ratio: 22.25
- Colors: Red and black
- Mascot: Lions
- Website: Liberty High School

Liberty High School is a public secondary school located in Peoria, Arizona, United States. The high school is a part of the Peoria Unified School District. The school opened in August 2006 due to overcrowding at Sunrise Mountain High School and rapid population growth in Peoria. Currently, approximately 2,350 students are enrolled, making it the district's second-largest high school.

== Sports ==
- Baseball (boys')
- Basketball (boys' and girls')
- Cheer (boys' and girls')
- Cross country (boys' and girls')
- Football (boys')
- Golf (boys' and girls')
- Soccer (boys' and girls')
- Mountain biking (boys' and girls') (NICA)
- Softball (girls')
- Swim/Dive (boys' and girls')
- Tennis (boys' and girls')
- Track (boys' and girls')
- Volleyball (boys' and girls')
- Wrestling (boys')

== Notable alumni ==
- Kyle Hinton, football player
