= Peoria High School (Arizona) =

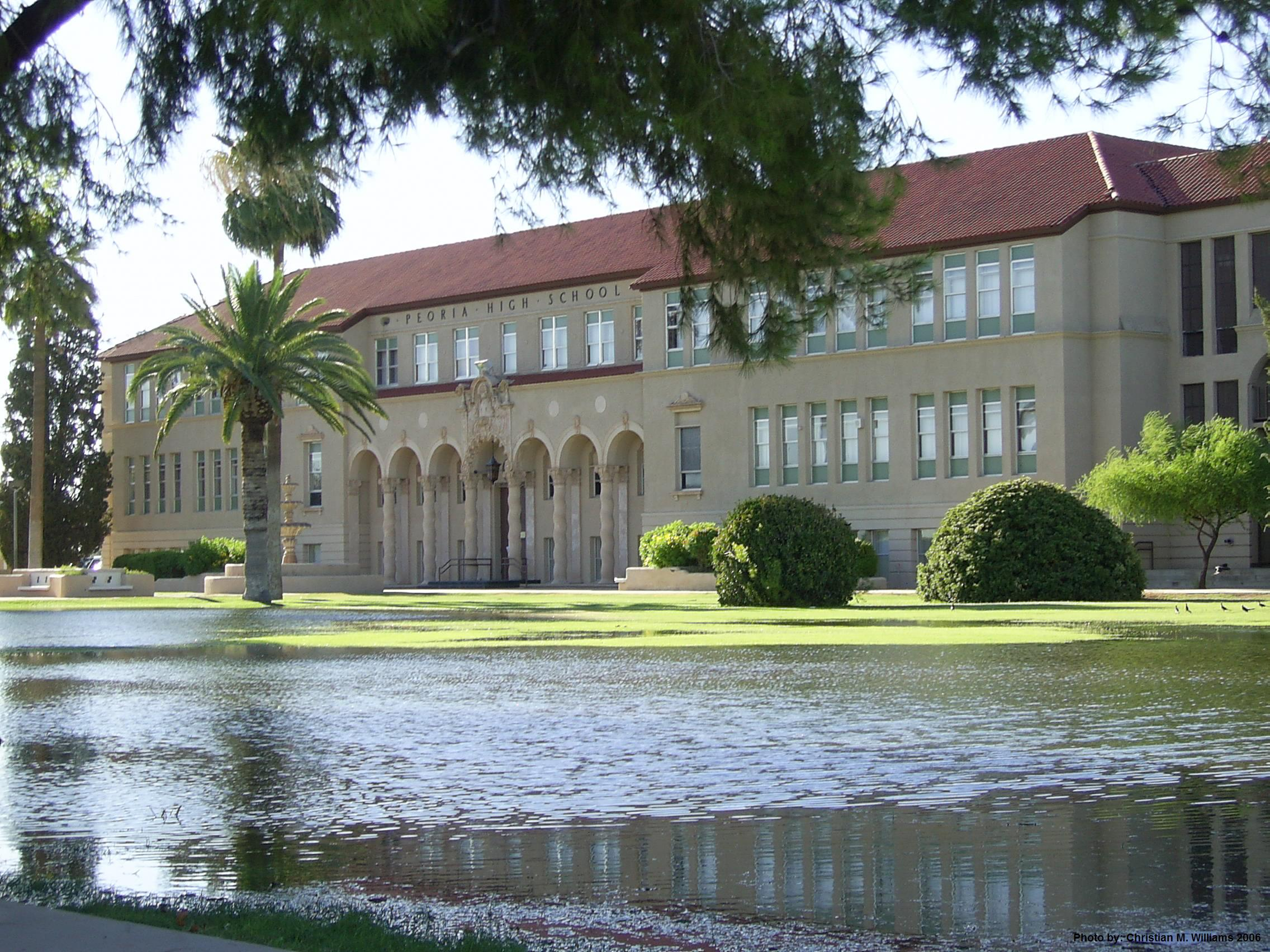

Location
- 11200 North 83rd Avenue Peoria, Arizona, United States of America 85345; 33°35′14″N 112°14′23″W

Information
- Type: Public Secondary
- Established: 1919; 107 years ago
- Principal: Sam Chagolla
- Teaching staff: 65.90 (FTE)
- Enrollment: 1,397 (2024-2025)
- Student to teacher ratio: 21.20
- Colors: Green and gold
- Mascot: Panthers
- Rivals: Cactus High School Centennial High School Raymond S. Kellis High School
- AIA Class: 4A
- Website: Peoria High School

Peoria High School is a public secondary school located in Peoria, Arizona, United States, serving grades 9 to 12. It is the oldest high school in the Peoria Unified School District and opened in 1919; its original building Old Main was constructed in 1922, renovated in 2014, and named a Historic Place in 2019. The school enrolls around 1,500 students, 10% of which participate in the school's Advanced Placement program. There are over 40 clubs on campus, as well as a strong athletics program.

== History ==
Peoria High School was originally located in the back of a general store/post office combination and taught by a single teacher in 1919, but after a railroad was built in the city, a new building opened in 1922, enrolling 50 students. At its opening, the school, built in the Spanish Colonial Revival style, was the largest structure in town and contained period luxuries such as indoor plumbing. In the next few decades, the school was the only Arizonan high school to continue allowing Japanese American students to attend during World War II, while in 1962, it was the first in the area to allow African American students to participate in sports.

The main building, Old Main, closed in 2008 for renovations, which would begin in 2012 and end in 2014, adding modernized classrooms, labs, and spaces, as well as a student lounge. After its reopening, the building also housed the district's non-traditional high school, the Peoria Flex Academy. The district's Medical, Engineering, and Technology (MET) Academy share the space with the Center, though the District acquired the Arizona Challenger Space Center building in 2017 with plans to move the Academy into the Space Center; by 2019, the District's board members voted to repurpose the center into an Arts Center where students from any high school may take specialized art classes.

In 2019, Old Main was named to the National Register of Historic Places.

== Enrollment ==
The school currently enrolls around 1,500 students, consisting of 51% male and 49% female students. The majority of students are Hispanic, with 55%, while 30% are White, 8% are Black, 3% are multiracial, 2% are Asian, 1% are Native American, and 0.3% are Native Hawaiian or Pacific Islander. 70% of the students are minorities. 56% of the students are economically disadvantaged, a metric calculated from the number of students receiving free or reduced priced lunches.

== Academics ==
Peoria High School offers various academic tracks: basic, honors, and Advanced Placement (AP). The basic track allows a wide variety of classes with no added weight in GPA. The honors program offers a somewhat harder work load, countered by a weighting the grade point average differently. The Advanced Placement (AP) program offers college credit with the same grade weighting as an honors class. All students may take a mixture of basic, honors and AP if they wish.

10% of students participate in the AP program.

Peoria High School's graduation rate is around 94%. The graduation ceremony takes place at the State Farm Stadium, which is located in the neighboring city of Glendale.

== Extracurricular activities ==
=== Clubs and organizations ===
Peoria has a variety of clubs and a marching band that has consistently placed third in its division at the State Marching Band Festival.

- AFJROTC
- AP Euro Club
- ASL Club/ASL Honor Club
- Auto (Automotive club)
- AVID
- Band
- Be a Leader (college-bound seniors)
- Book Club
- Boys State (Junior boys summer government experience)
- Chess Club
- Choir
- Christian Club on Campus
- Clay Club
- Cub Links (freshman mentorship club)
- Culinary Arts
- Dance
- DECA
- Economics Club
- Future Business Leaders of America
- Fellowship of Christian Athletes
- Future Farmers of America
- Freshman Class (Student Council)
- Fuel to Play 60 (Health movement and food club)
- Girls State (Junior girls summer government experience)
- Gay Straight Alliance
- HOPE (Fellowship)
- Jobs for Arizona Graduates (JAG)
- Panthers Knit! (Knitting and crocheting)
- Junior Class (Student Council)
- Mat Maids (Wrestling support group)
- Media Productions
- MESA
- National Honor Society
- Otacon Club (Anime, gaming, and Japanese culture)
- Peoria Open Minds (Creative writing, community outreach)
- Senior Class (Student Council)
- SkillsUSA/Building Trades
- Sophomore Class (Student Council)
- Spiritline (Cheer, school spirit)
- Sports Medicine
- Student Council
- Thespians
- Winter guard
- Yearbook

=== Athletics ===
Peoria won its first state football championship in 1939, when the team was still known as the Horned Toads.

In the late 1980s, Peoria was one of the most dominant and successful athletics programs in Arizona. Between 1984 and 1989, Peoria won 8 State Championships in Men's and Women's Basketball, Women's Softball, Men's Baseball, Football and Wrestling.

Championships

- Football 4A State Champions: 1944, 1986, 1987, 1994 (co-champions).
- Football Class A District Champs: 1973
- Women's Basketball 4A State Champions: 1988, 1989
- Men's Basketball State Champions: 1937, 1984 (4A), 2012 (Div. II), 2023
- Women's Tennis Doubles State Champ: 1975
- Baseball State Champions: 1988, 1989
- Softball State Champions: 1989
- Wrestling State Championships: 1974, 1996, 1997, 1998, 1999
- Wrestling State Champion: Sammy Chagolla 1980, 1981, 1982, 1983
- Women's Wrestling State Champion: Nylease Yzagere 2023
- Men's Track and Field Championships: 2009

== Alumni ==
- Tom Greenfield, NFL center / linebacker
- Eric Guliford, wide receiver—Arizona State University, Minnesota Vikings and New Orleans Saints
- Tim Toone, wide receiver—Weber State, Detroit Lions (Mr. Irrelevant 2010 Draft)
- Jamal Miles, running back—Arizona State University, Jacksonville Jaguars, Arizona Rattlers
- Luke Holland, former drummer for the band The Word Alive
