= Sunrise Mountain High School =

Public secondary school in Peoria, Arizona

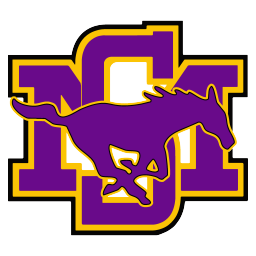

Location
- 21200 N 83rd Ave, Peoria, Arizona, USA; 33°40′38″N 112°14′24″W

Information
- Type: Public secondary
- Motto: 'It's a Great Day to be a Mustang!"
- Established: 1996; 30 years ago
- Principal: Vance Setka
- Teaching staff: 92.08 (FTE)
- Enrollment: 1,973 (2023-2024)
- Student to teacher ratio: 21.43
- Colors: Purple, White and Gold
- Mascot: Mustangs
- Newspaper: The Mustang Express
- Yearbook: The Stampede
- AIA Class: 5A - Northwest
- Website: Sunrise Mountain High School

Sunrise Mountain High School is a public secondary school located in Peoria, Arizona, and is part of the Peoria Unified School District. The school opened its doors in August 1996. It is the district's second-smallest high school by enrollment, larger than only Cactus High School.

== Overpopulation problem ==
Sunrise Mountain dealt with considerable overgrowth in the early and mid-2000s. With 2,440 students by 2005, many freshmen classes were moved to the school’s North Campus known as "Frosh Island.” The campus took over the former Fletcher Heights Elementary School, now Legacy Traditional School Peoria. Between each period a bus would shuttle students between the north campus and the main campus so that classes such as physical education, band, advanced science, and choir could be attended by freshmen. The use of this campus was discontinued by Sunrise Mountain following the end of the 2005-2006 school year. The overpopulation problem has been relieved by the creation of Liberty High School. Liberty is now larger than Sunrise Mountain by some 600 students.

== Performing Arts ==
Sunrise Mountain has a marching band, concert band and jazz band. The jazz band competes yearly in the Northern Arizona University jazz competition. The Sunrise Mountain High School marching band competes in the Arizona Marching Band Association (AzMBA) under Division 5A and undergoes the nickname, "The Pride of Sunrise".

Sunrise Mountain has choral, orchestra, and piano programs representing the Peoria Unified School District. Sunrise Mountain is the only school in PUSD to have an orchestra. The choir has achieved superior in several festivals over the past years, including Superior with Distinction, which was won by the Varsity Choir at the NAU Jazz Festival in February 2017.

Sunrise Mountain is home to a drama program and a dance program. Every year, the thespians perform in the annual arts festival.

The Sunrise Mountain theater club was included in a segment on Last Week Tonight with John Oliver on June 5, 2022.

== Sports ==
Sunrise Mountain has many various types of sports. Sunrise Mountain Mustangs have had a long-standing rivalry between fellow Peoria District schools, Liberty Lions, and Centennial Coyotes. Sunrise Mountain also acquired the first Laser Projector in Arizona for high school sports, located in their gymnasium.

Fall

- Football [Male]
- Volleyball [Female]
- Cross Country [Male and Female]
- Golf [Male and Female]
- Swim [Male and Female]
- Badminton [Female]
- Marching Band [Male and Female]

Winter

- Basketball [Male and Female]
- Soccer [Male and Female]
- Wrestling [Male and Female]

Spring

- Boys' Baseball [Male]
- Girls' Softball [Female]
- Tennis [Male and Female]
- Track [Male and Female]
- Volleyball [Male]

== Notable alumni ==
- Aaron Bummer, professional baseball pitcher for the Chicago White Sox
- Jaff Decker, former professional baseball player
- Joel Kuhnel, professional baseball pitcher for the Cincinnati Reds
- Seth Martinez, professional baseball pitcher for the Houston Astros

== Feeder schools ==
All of the following are K–8 schools:

- Apache
- Coyote Hills
- Frontier
- Parkridge
