= Jonathan Ornelas =

American baseball player (born 2000)

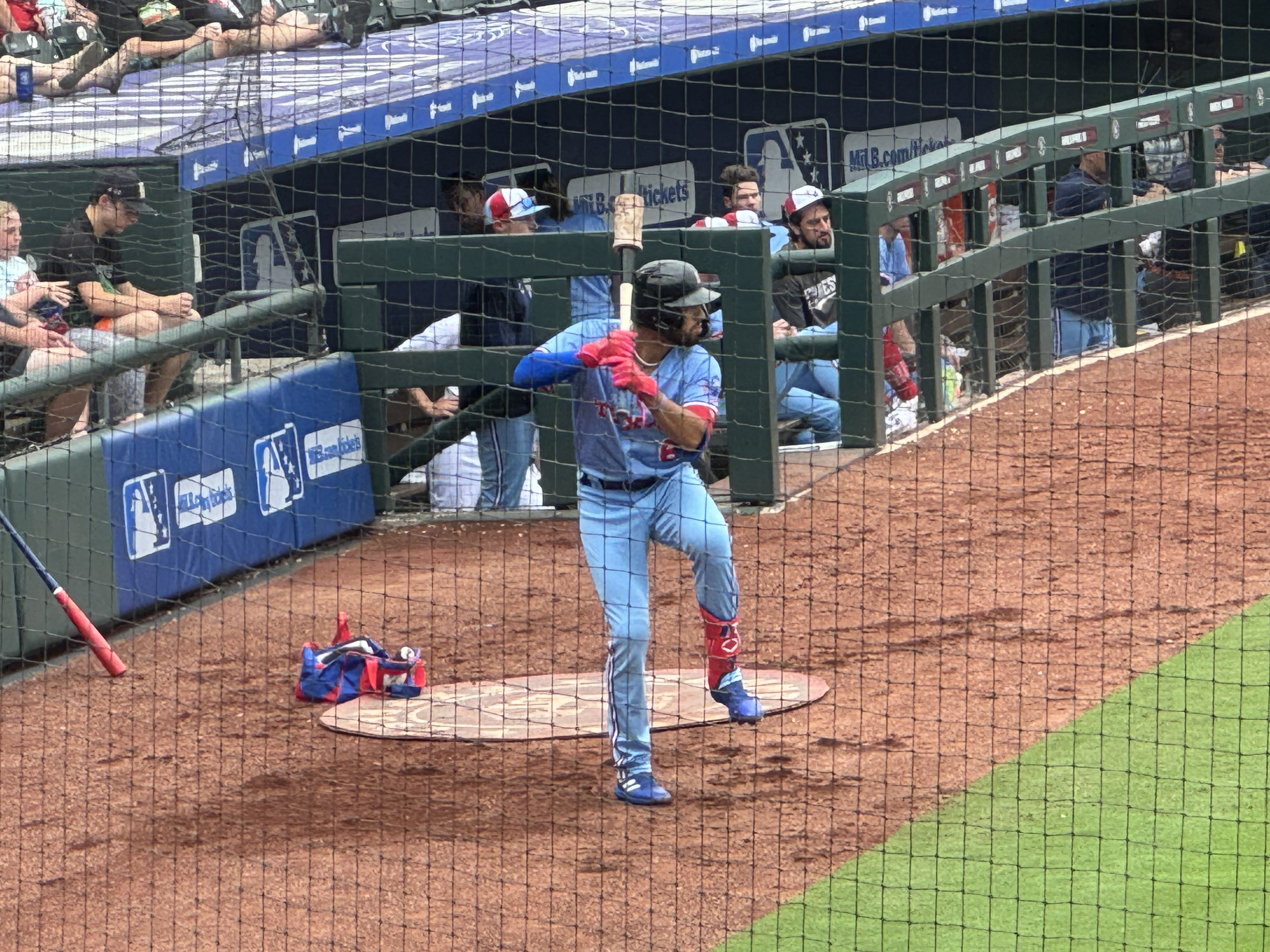
- Ornelas with the Round Rock Express in 2024

Milwaukee Brewers
- Infielder
- Born: May 26, 2000 (age 26); Glendale, Arizona, U.S.
- Bats: Right Throws: Right

MLB debut
- August 7, 2023, for the Texas Rangers

MLB statistics (through 2026 season)
- Batting average: .203
- Home runs: 0
- Runs batted in: 4
- Stats at Baseball Reference

Teams
- Texas Rangers (2023–2025); Atlanta Braves (2025); Athletics (2026); Milwaukee Brewers (2026)

Jonathan Ornelas (born May 26, 2000) is an American professional baseball infielder in the Milwaukee Brewers organization. He has previously played in Major League Baseball (MLB) for the Texas Rangers, Atlanta Braves, and Athletics. He made his MLB debut in 2023.

== Amateur career ==
Ornelas attended Raymond S. Kellis High School in Glendale, Arizona. In his senior season of 2018, he hit .464 with 15 doubles, six home runs, 29 RBI, and 19 stolen bases. He had committed to the University of Tennessee to play college baseball. Ornelas was drafted by the Texas Rangers with the 91st overall selection in the 3rd round of the 2018 MLB draft. He signed with them for a $622,800 signing bonus.

== Professional career ==
=== Texas Rangers ===
Ornelas was assigned to the rookie-level Arizona League Rangers and in 48 games hit .302/.389/.459 with 3 home runs, 28 RBI, and 15 stolen bases over 48 games in his professional debut season of 2018. Ornelas spent the 2019 season with the Hickory Crawdads of the Single–A South Atlantic League, hitting .257/.333/.373 with 6 home runs, 13 stolen bases, and 38 RBI. He did not play in a game in 2020 due to the cancellation of the minor league season because of the COVID-19 pandemic. Ornelas returned to Hickory (which had moved classification to the High-A East level), hitting .261/.310/.394 with 8 home runs, 9 stolen bases, and 38 RBI. Ornelas spent the 2022 season with the Frisco RoughRiders of the Double-A Texas League. He hit .299/.360/.425 with 14 home runs, 64 RBI, 14 stolen bases, and tied the Frisco franchise record by recording 157 hits in 2022. Ornelas was named the Texas Rangers 2022 minor league Defender of the Year.

On November 15, 2022, the Rangers added Ornelas to their 40-man roster to protect him from the Rule 5 draft. Ornelas was optioned to the Round Rock Express of the Triple-A Pacific Coast League to begin the 2023 season. On August 7, Ornelas was called up to the major leagues for the first time. He made his debut that night versus the Oakland Athletics as a pinch runner, scoring the eventual winning run in the eighth inning.

Ornelas was optioned to Triple–A Round Rock to begin the 2024 season. He was called up on June 30 following an injury to Corey Seager. In 18 appearances for Texas, Ornelas batted .216/.256/.270 with three RBI.

Ornelas was optioned to Triple-A Round Rock to begin the 2025 season. He played in four games for Texas, recording one walk and going hitless in five at-bats. Ornelas was designated for assignment by the Rangers on May 19, 2025.

=== Atlanta Braves ===
On May 24, 2025, Ornelas was traded to the Atlanta Braves in exchange for cash considerations and optioned to the Triple-A Gwinnett Stripers. He played in two games for Atlanta, totaling two hits in four at-bats. On September 19, Ornelas was designated for assignment by the Braves. He cleared waivers and was sent outright to the Triple-A Gwinnett Stripers on September 25. Ornelas elected free agency following the season on November 6.

=== New York Yankees ===
On November 14, 2025, Ornelas signed a minor league contract with the New York Yankees. In 75 appearances for the Triple–A Scranton/Wilkes-Barre Railriders, he batted .299/.362/.480 with nine home runs, 39 RBI, and nine stolen bases. On July 16, 2026, Ornelas was released by the Yankees after exercising the opt–out clause in his contract.

=== Athletics ===
On July 23, 2026, Ornelas signed a minor league contract with the Athletics. He made six appearances for the Triple–A Las Vegas Aviators, going 10–for–23 (.435) with two home runs, seven RBI, and two stolen bases. On July 31, the Athletics selected Ornelas' contract, adding him to their active roster. Appearing in six games for the club, he went 2–for–12 (.167) with one walk. Ornelas was designated for assignment by the Athletics on August 10. He cleared waivers and was sent outright to Las Vegas on August 12.

=== Milwaukee Brewers ===
On August 15, 2026, Ornelas was traded to the Milwaukee Brewers, who subsequently selected his contract and added him to their active roster. He made three appearances for Milwaukee, going 2–for–9 (.222) with one RBI. Ornelas was designated for assignment by the Brewers on August 25. He cleared waivers and elected free agency on August 28. Ornelas re-signed with Milwaukee on a new minor league contract on August 31.
