= Peoria Unified School District =

Public school district in Maricopa County, Arizona

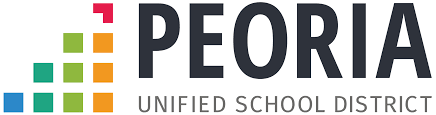

- The district office of Peoria Unified School District.

Address
- 6330 West Thunderbird Road Glendale, Arizona, 85306; United States
- Coordinates: 33.611613°N 112.195135°W

District information
- Type: Public
- Motto: Every Student, Every Day, Prepared To Shape Tomorrow
- Grades: PK–12
- Established: 1889; 137 years ago
- Superintendent: Kenneth Christopher Somers
- Schools: 44
- NCES District ID: 0406250

Students and staff
- Students: 35,466 (2023–24)
- Teachers: 1,871.48 (FTE)
- Student–teacher ratio: 18.95

Other information
- Website: www.peoriaunified.org

Peoria Unified School District #11 (PUSD) is a school district headquartered in the District Administration Center (DAC) in Glendale, Arizona, United States. It provides both primary and secondary education for most of Peoria, some areas of Glendale and Youngtown, and a small area of Surprise, and numerous unincorporated areas of Maricopa County. The district has 44 schools.

== History ==
Peoria Unified School District #11 began in 1889 in an abandoned grocery store, covering 49 square miles (127 km^{2}). During the first school year, the class size expanded from 5 to 15 students.

The following year the district opened with a class size of three students. Maricopa County was considering merging Peoria District #11 with Washington Elementary School District #6. According to William Bartlett: One day early in July, Mr. Mann, stopped a covered wagon along Grand Avenue; the wagon had several children inside. Mann discovered that the driver had 9 children and was heading to Phoenix or anywhere else that would provide employment, and told the driver "You have got a job right here". Eight of the Bills children enrolled in Peoria School and District 11 survived.

In 1905, the first building was destroyed by fire; a bond election to build a new school passed by only one vote. A controversy arose about how many rooms the new school should have; many residents claimed that Peoria would never need more than two rooms in a school. The $3,200 two-room Central School was finally built on 83rd Avenue and Madison Street.

In 1942, during World War II and Executive Order 9066, the Peoria Unified board voted to allow Japanese American students who were allowed to stay in their homes and had been driven out of other districts in the area to attend.

In the early 1950s, the school board voted to integrate classes once again when they desegregated their classes and allowed black and white students to attend classes together. That same year, Peoria began an integrated English learning program, where non-English speaking Latino students would attend general classes.

In January 2005, the Marshall Ranch Jazz Band, under the direction of Jill Mahoney, was selected to perform along with Joey Sellers at the International Association for Jazz Education in Long Beach, California.

In May 2007, the PUSD Governing Board voted to close all high school campuses during lunch entirely by taking away parental choice. A number of other metro Phoenix districts have made similar changes recently.

The PUSD Governing Board instituted a closed campus for the 2006–2007 school year. Despite a walkout, continuing rancor and conflict at the board meetings, and a petition signed by over 2600 parents and students, the governing board has stood firm on this, and students are now required to remain on campus during lunch time. Despite the new policy appearing to be a reversal of a policy approved in the 2005-2006 year, which permitted juniors and seniors with C averages to leave with parental permission forms signed, district spokesman Jim Cummings said the new rules do not alter past policy. The closed campus policy has remained in high schools throughout the district in the 2007-2008 year, and is scheduled to continue.

In March 2009, Peoria's Superintendent announced that up to 900 teachers may lose their positions in the district. Only teachers who have worked in the district for at least two years are likely to be affected. In addition, teachers who are eligible for retirement or those who have previously retired and are working under contract may be next on the chopping block. "We are preparing for the worst, but hoping for the very best," said Dr. Denton Santarelli, the Peoria Unified School District superintendent.

== Schools ==
High schools in the Peoria Unified School District
School	Cactus	Centennial	Ironwood	Liberty	Peoria	Raymond S. Kellis	Sunrise Mountain
Location	Glendale	Peoria	Glendale	Peoria	Peoria	Glendale	Peoria
Year opened	1977	1990	1986	2006	1922	2004	1996
School colors	Columbia blue, silver	Red, white, navy blue	Red, gray	Red, black	Green, gold	Vegas gold, navy blue	Purple, white, gold
School mascot	Cobras	Coyotes	Eagles	Lions	Panthers	Cougars	Mustangs

== List of elementary schools ==
- Alta Loma
- Apache
- Canyon
- Cheyenne
- Copperwood
- Cotton Boll
- Country Meadows
- Coyote Hills
- Desert Harbor
- Desert Palms
- Desert Valley
- Foothills
- Frontier
- Heritage
- Ira A. Murphy
- Lake Pleasant
- Marshall Ranch
- Oakwood
- Oasis
- Parkridge
- Paseo Verde
- Peoria
- Sahuaro Ranch
- Santa Fe
- Sky View
- Sun Valley
- Sundance
- Sunflower Center
- Sunset Heights
- Vistancia
- Zuni Hills

== Other schools and assets ==
- Peoria Transition Center Website - Transition Center For Students With Disciplinarian Issues
- Peoria Flex Academy - Alternative High School
- Peoria Traditional School - K-8 school
- KNOW - Cable channel run by the district in the cities of Glendale and Peoria. It displays classes, interviews, board meetings, and children's programming
