= Peoria Center for the Performing Arts =

Theater in Peoria, Arizona

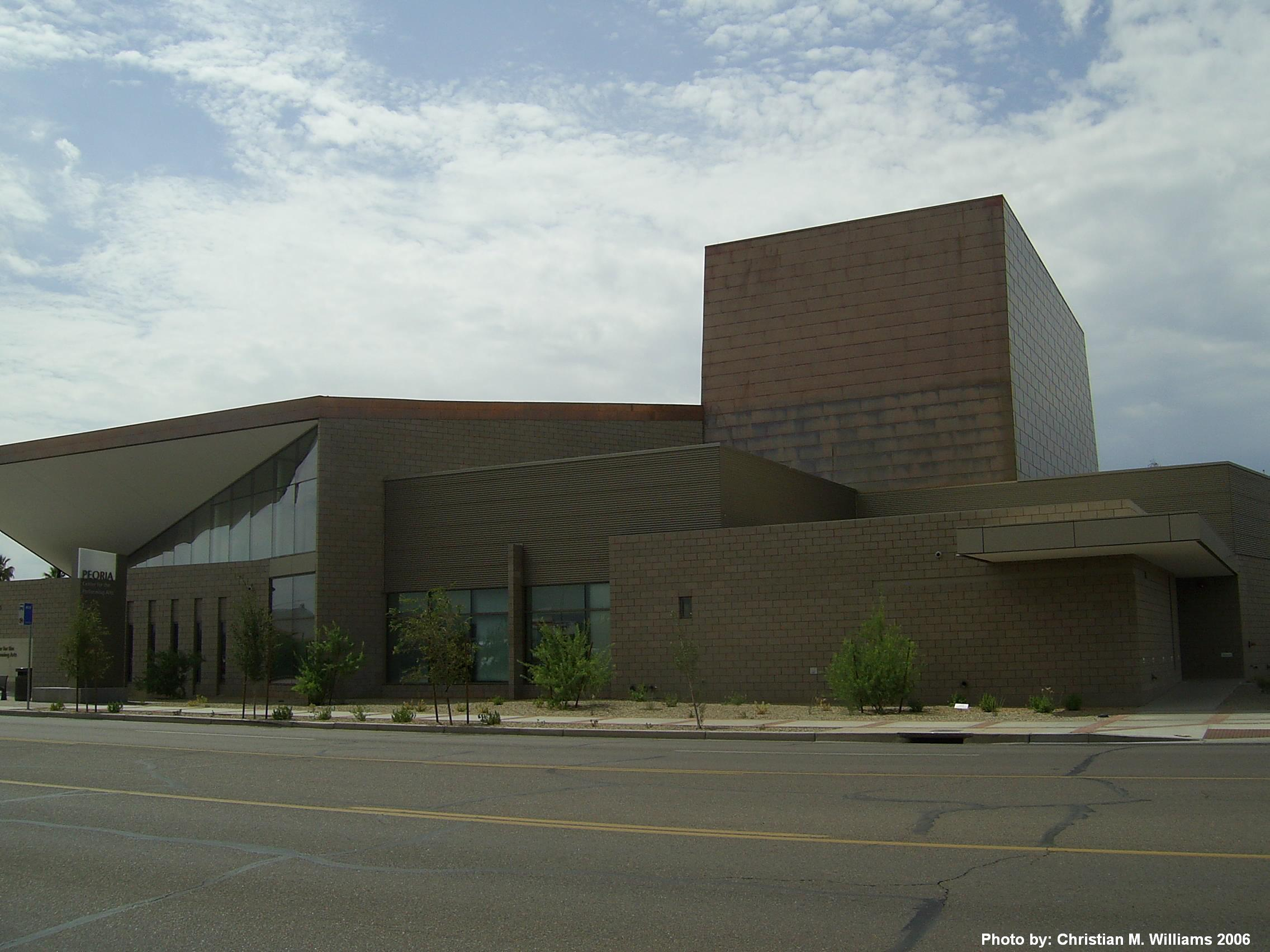
- PCPA as seen from the north side of the building.
- Interactive map of Peoria Center for the Performing Arts
- Address: 10580 N 83rd Dr
- Location: Peoria, Arizona
- Coordinates: 33.5812879°N 112.2389755°W
- Owner: City of Peoria
- Operator: Theater Works
- Type: Theater

Construction
- Groundbreaking: 2005
- Opened: 2006

The Peoria Center for the Performing Arts is a community theater and event space located in the historic Old Town district of Peoria, Arizona. The building houses two theaters. The venue was completed and a dedication ceremony was held on December 15, 2006, as a joint venture with the City of Peoria and the theater company, Theater Works, who operates the building. The center would not officially open until February 2007 after Theater Works had moved in.

Received Best New Playhouse in 2008 by Phoenix New Times. Best New Playhouse.

The facility was designed by Westlake Reed Leskosky and cost $13 million. Architectural Record Peoria Center for the Performing Arts. The building's “dirty penny” colored roof is pure copper. When originally constructed the metal reflected too much sunlight that could be seen up to a mile away. The City opted to chemically accelerate the weathering process fix the issues it cause, particularly along Grand Avenue.

Events such as live theater, dance performances, concerts, comedy acts, kids events, puppet shows and much more. The building also houses a city art gallery in the lobby and hosts the Second Saturdays music series for the city, also using neighboring Osuna Park.

== Building Features ==
Mary Jane Gyder Theater - the Gyder Theater is the main stage theater for the PCPA. The theater has a 274-person capacity and an orchestra pit. Named after the supporter and one time Volunteer Coordinator of Theater Works. The Gyder family continues to support the theater.

Constance W. McMillin Theater - the McMillin Theater is an 80-seat black box theater with flexible seating. Named after the local philanthropist and long time Theater Works supporter who has served on the board of directors and sponsored numerous productions.

Root Studios - two classrooms next to the Gyder Theater that act as both rehearsal space and educational space for theater classes and camps. Named after the supporter and one time board president of Theater Works, Robert T. Root.

The building also has three dressing rooms, a green room, a set construction shop, a costume shop, and offices backstage.
