= Raymond S. Kellis High School =

High school in Glendale, Arizona

Location
- 8990 W. Orangewood Avenue, Glendale, Arizona, United States of America; 33°32′45″N 112°15′13″W

Information
- Type: Public secondary
- Motto: Cougar Pride! Is It In You?
- Established: 2004; 22 years ago
- Principal: Tony Vining
- Faculty: 119
- Teaching staff: 79.35 (FTE)
- Enrollment: 1,691 (2024-2025)
- Student to teacher ratio: 21.31
- Colors: Vegas gold, navy blue, black
- Mascot: Cougar
- Rival: Peoria High School
- AIA Class: 5A
- Website: Official website

Raymond S. Kellis High School is a public secondary school located in Glendale, Arizona, United States, part of the Peoria Unified School District. It opened in August 2004 due to overcrowding at Peoria High School and rapid population growth in the surrounding area. The school is the district's fourth-largest, with approximately 1,850 students.

Kellis High School is located near State Farm Stadium, home of the Arizona Cardinals, and Desert Diamond Arena, former home of the Arizona Coyotes.

== Notable alumni ==
- Jonathan Ornelas, professional baseball player
- Armando Hernandez Jr., perpetrator of the 2020 Westgate Entertainment District shooting
