= Jason Beck (politician) =

American politician and businessman

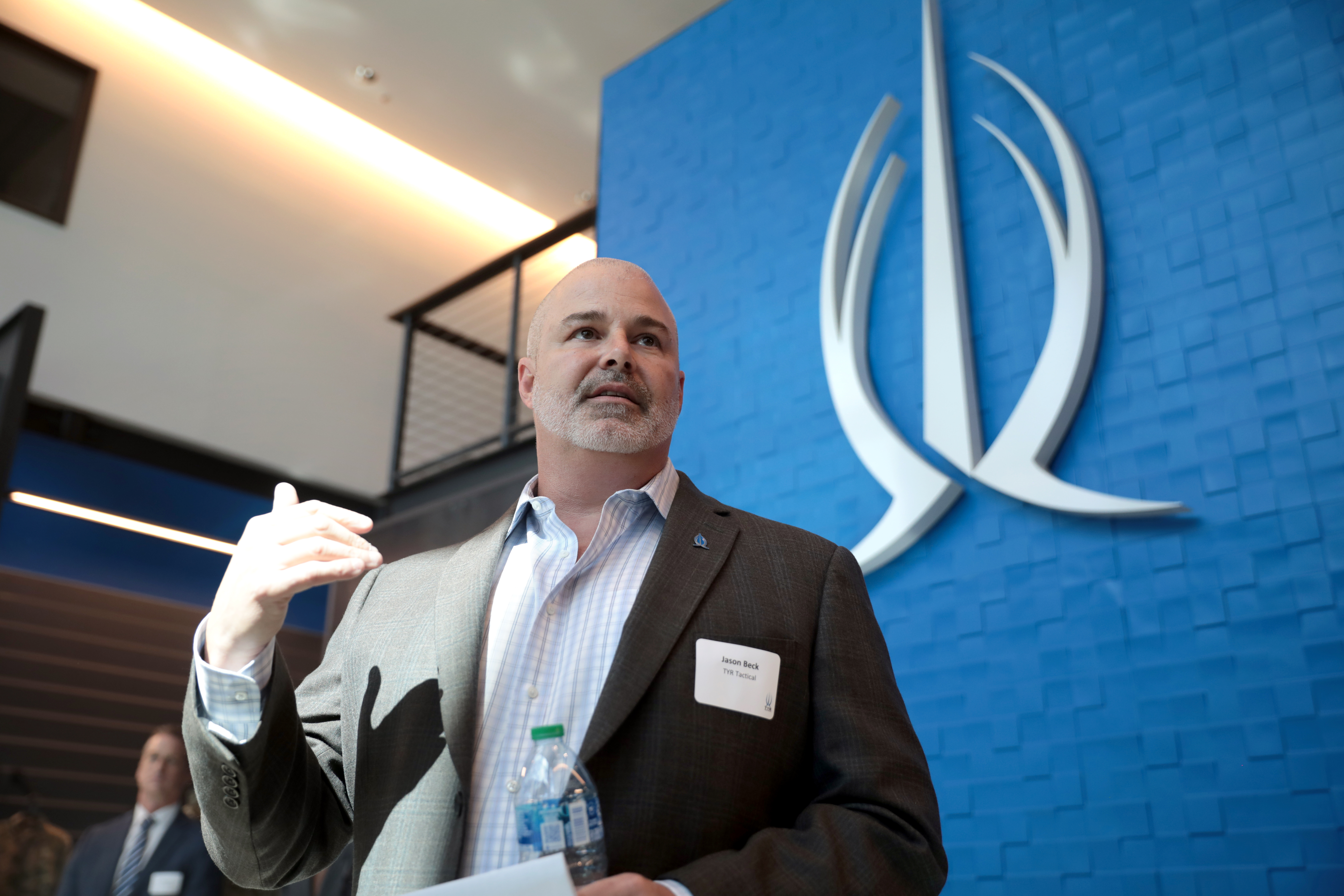
- Beck in 2021

Mayor of Peoria
- Incumbent
- Assumed office January 3, 2023
- Preceded by: Cathy Carlat

Personal details
- Born: June 1, 1972
- Party: Republican
- Spouse: Jane Beck
- Children: 6
- Education: Springfield Catholic High School (Missouri)

Jason Beck (born June 1, 1972) is an American politician and CEO. He is the current mayor of Peoria, Arizona and the founder and CEO of Tyr Tactical, a tactical gear company headquartered in Peoria.

== Personal life ==
Jason Beck grew up in Missouri, spending much of his early life in foster care. He attended Springfield Catholic High School in Springfield Missouri.

Beck attended college for a short time, but ultimately left after feeling that it was not the best choice for him. In 1992, Beck joined the Marine Corps Reserve but left after three years after being offered a deal to cut his contract short.

Beck is married his wife Jane, with whom he has six sons.

== Political career ==
In December 2021, Jason Beck announced that he would run against Peoria councilwoman and executive director of the Cactus League baseball association, Bridget Binsbacher.

Beck ran on the ideal of “realizing Peoria’s full potential,” hoping to make the city a place where residents both lived and worked. Beck secured more funding for the city’s fire and medical departments to decrease emergency response times. He also added more law enforcement positions, particularly adding several student liaison officers in some of the city’s elementary schools.

Beck assumed the office of Peoria mayor on January 3, 2023.

On December 3, 2025, announced that he would not run for reelection and leave office after his first term, citing a goal to focusing on his business and family. Beck further stated his belief that he had “shaken up” and transformed the city economically during his time in office that met his initial goals as mayor.

The city of Peoria was recognized the Best City for Business by the Arizona Chamber of Commerce and Industry on June 2, 2026, recognizing Beck and his policies implemented as mayor.

== Business career ==
In 2001, Jason Beck founded and headed Diamond Tactical, which he started out of a rented storage unit. In 2008, Beck sold the company, and signed a two-year non-compete agreement. When the agreement was up, he started another tactical gear production company, Tyr Tactical, and rehiring many of his former employees.

Tyr Tactical opened in May 2010, beginning as a 120 sq. ft. facility in Peoria. The company built a Canadian facility in 2015 to serve its Canadian market, which had grown substantially, with desks with several Canadian government agencies. In 2017, the company expanded their facilities, building a new 78,000 square-foot building in Peoria to meet the needs of the company and further produce the company’s products. Tyr built its third facility to date in Aarhus, Denmark to serve as a hub for the company’s growing European market, especially in Denmark, as they heavily supply gear to the Danish military. As of 2021, the company has also further expanded their headquarters in Peoria adding a hard armor manufacturing facility and is working on a third and fourth building on 9.2 acres in the area.

Beck and his company gained the political spotlight when then-Vice President Mike Pence toured the Peoria facility and campaigned there for Donald Trump in 2020 during a stop in Arizona.

Following the Hamas attack on Israel that sparked the Gaza war, Beck sent tactical gear to the Israeli military forces in late October. In November of 2023, he travelled to Israel to see the effects of the war firsthand and donate further gear to the Israeli forces.

Beck announced in October 2025, that he was planning to sell TYR Tactical to Cadre Holdings, a Jacksonville based company that provides safety and survivability products worldwide. The acquisition was officially completed on February 2, 2026 with Cadre purchasing that company for $120.0 million in cash, $24.0 million of Cadre stock, as well as $1.0 million inrestricted stock unit awards for some employees of TYR Tactical. Jason Beck remains president of TYR and is now the second-largest shareholder of Cadre.
