= 2015 Northern Arizona University shooting =

Mass shooting in Arizona, U.S.

- Location: 35.1904°N 111.6503°W; Flagstaff, Arizona, United States
- Date: October 9, 2015; 11 years ago 1:20 a.m. (MST (UTC−6))
- Target: Delta Chi fraternity members at Northern Arizona University
- Weapon: .40-caliber Glock 22
- Deaths: 1
- Injuries: 3
- Perpetrator: Steven Edward Jones

On October 9, 2015, Steven Edward Jones, an 18-year-old freshman at Northern Arizona University, shot four people, killing Colin Charles Brough and severely injuring three others, in a parking lot outside of Mountain View Hall on the Northern Arizona University campus in Flagstaff, Arizona.

Jones was charged with one count of first-degree murder and three counts of aggravated assault. He pleaded not guilty, taking responsibility for the shooting but saying that he acted in self-defense. After a 2017 mistrial, Jones pleaded guilty to one count of non-dangerous manslaughter and three counts of aggravated assault before the retrial was scheduled to begin. On February 11, 2020, Jones was sentenced to six years in prison, before being released after four years and seven months.

== Shooting ==
At approximately 1:20 am on the morning of October 9, 2015, in a parking lot near Mountain View Hall on the Flagstaff Mountain campus of Northern Arizona University in Flagstaff, Arizona, 18-year-old freshman Steven Jones shot four 20-year-old juniors with a .40-caliber Glock 22, killing Colin Brough and severely injuring Nicholas Piring, Nicholas Prato, and Kyle Zientek.

It was later determined that Jones had fired ten shots during the shooting. Brough, Piring, and Zientek each were each struck twice, and Prato was struck once.

The shooting occurred after a dispute between a group of three pledges of the Sigma Chi fraternity, including Jones, and a group of three members of Delta Chi, including Brough. Jones testified that the Delta Chi members had assaulted him and threatened his life, which was corroborated by several witnesses, and supported by images—taken during police interrogation following the incident—of injuries Jones sustained during the incident.

All four victims were intoxicated, while Jones had no drugs or alcohol in his system at the time of the shooting.

Jones was arrested shortly after the shooting and charged with one count of first degree homicide and three counts of aggravated assault on the same day as the shooting. His bail was set at $2,000,000.

== Perpetrator ==
Steven Edward Jones (born 1996 or 1997) was raised in Glendale, Arizona, a suburb of Phoenix. He has no siblings. Before college, Jones was homeschooled.

== Aftermath ==
=== Trial ===
During a court hearing on October 22, 2015, Jones entered a plea of not guilty.

He was granted pre-trial release on April 12, 2016, and was released the next day, after spending six months in jail.

Jones' trial began on April 5, 2017, at the Coconino County Superior Courthouse in Flagstaff, Arizona. Thirty-eight witnesses, all three surviving victims, and Jones testified. The jury began deliberation on April 25, though they were unable to reach a verdict, and a mistrial was declared on May 2.

A retrial was originally scheduled for August 1, but five delays postponed it until February 2020. In December 2017, prosecutors agreed to reduce the charge to second-degree murder, in part to avoid the possibility of double jeopardy, which was an argument made by the defendant to dismiss the first degree murder charges, based upon comments made by some jury members to the judge after the first trial. On January 9, 2020, Jones pleaded guilty to one count of manslaughter and three counts of aggravated assault, one month prior to the scheduled retrial. On February 11, he was sentenced to six years in prison. Jones was incarcerated at the Red Rock Correctional Center in Eloy, Arizona.

Nicholas Acevedo, one of the 38 witnesses in the original trial, died of suicide on March 4, 2018, prior to the retrial's scheduled date. His parents believed that the trial had contributed to his suicide.

=== Release from prison ===
Jones was paroled on August 19, 2024, after serving four and a half years in prison, and seven months in jail before that.

=== Civil suit ===
On June 30, 2017, a civil lawsuit for negligence was filed against Jones and his parents by Piring, Prato, and Brough's parents. The case was dismissed in January 2018, after the parties reached a confidential settlement.

== See also ==
- Gun violence in the United States
- List of school shootings in the United States
- List of school shootings in the United States by death toll
