= Casa Grande bombing =

2012 terrorist bombing

Coordinates: 32.88001°N 111.7428°W

On November 29, 2012, a bomb placed at the back door of the Casa Grande, Arizona, U.S. Social Security Administration office shook the city's downtown but failed to breach the building. An Iraqi-born convicted felon, Abdullatif Ali Aldosary, 47, was charged. Evidence collected at his home shows he researched "terrorist bombs" and amassed appropriate materials.

Aldosary, allowed entry as a refugee, was denied a green card based on his "terrorism-related activities" as an insurgent fighting Saddam Hussein in 1991. No motive was suggested by authorities. Eventual charges included 14 counts of attempted murder in connection with the 14 people inside the office at the time the bomb exploded.

Aldosary was also charged with an unrelated first-degree murder in connection with a 2012 shooting in Maricopa. The victim was 26-year-old Orlando Requena, who was shot and killed three days before the bombing. In 2014, Aldosary was sentenced to five years in federal court for weapons charges in connection with the bombing. In 2023, Aldosary was convicted of Requena's murder and was sentenced to life in prison.
