= Peoria, Arizona =

City in Arizona, United States

- City
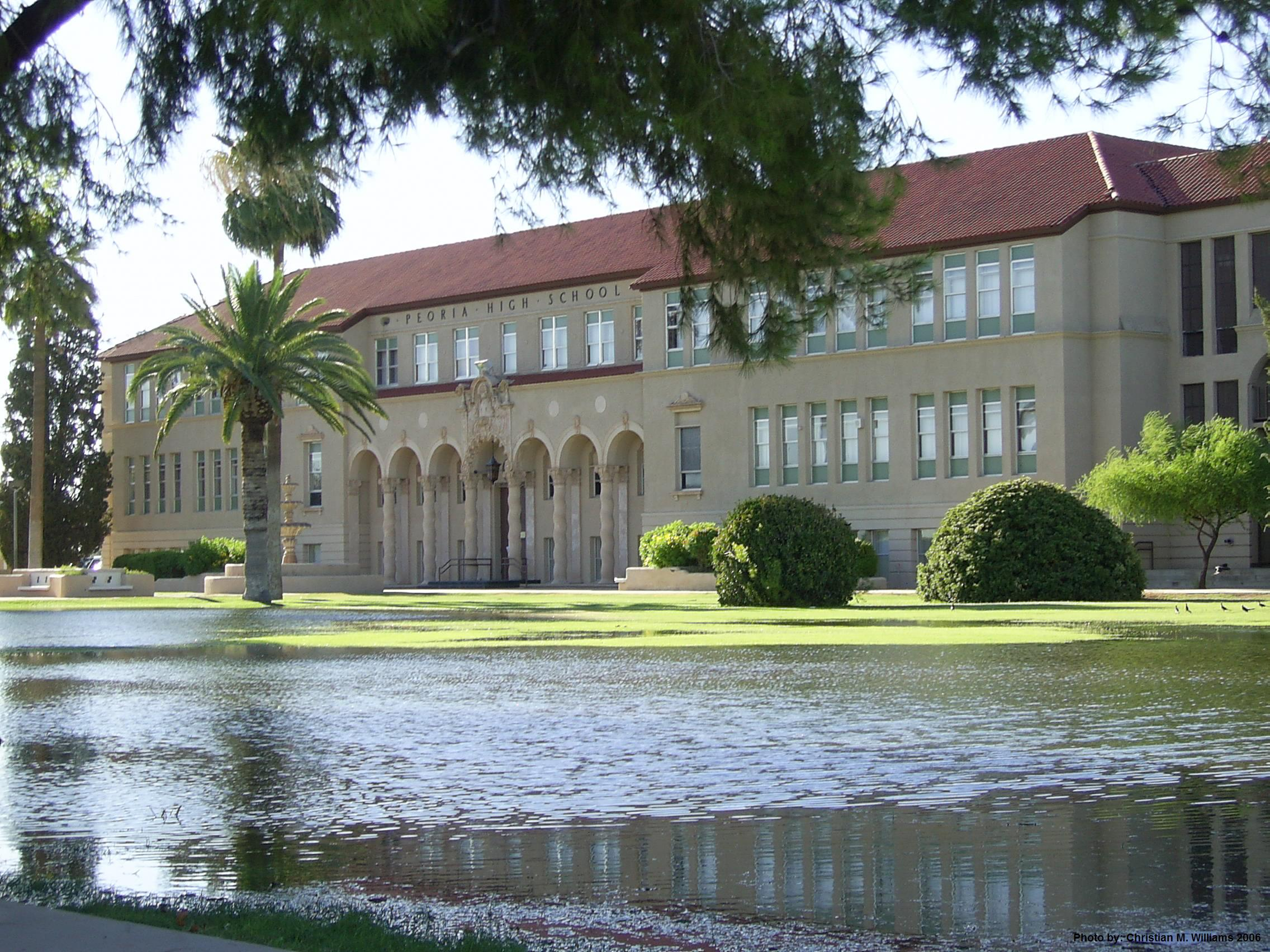
- Peoria High School

- Flag Seal

- Location in Maricopa County and Yavapai County, Arizona

- Location in Arizona Peoria (the United States)
- Coordinates: 33°34′57″N 112°14′19″W
- Country: United States
- State: Arizona
- Counties: Maricopa, Yavapai
- Established: June 7, 1954
- Named for: Peoria, Illinois

Government
  - Type: Mayor-council government
  - Mayor: Jason Beck (R)
  - Vice Mayor: Denette Dunn

Area
  - Total: 179.25 sq mi (464.25 km^{2})
  - Land: 176.08 sq mi (456.05 km^{2})
  - Water: 3.17 sq mi (8.20 km^{2})
- Elevation: 1,581 ft (482 m)

Population (2020)
  - Total: 190,985
  - Rank: US: 146th
  - Density: 1,084.6/sq mi (418.78/km^{2})
- Time zone: UTC−7 (MST (no DST))
- ZIP codes: 85345, 85373, 85380-85383, 85385
- Area codes: 623 and 928
- FIPS code: 04-54050
- GNIS feature ID: 2411401
- Website: www.peoriaaz.gov

Peoria (/piˈɔːriə/ pee-OR-ee-ə) is a city in Maricopa and Yavapai counties in the U.S. state of Arizona. Most of the city is located in Maricopa County, while a portion of it in the north is in Yavapai County. It is a major suburb of Phoenix. As of the 2020 census, the population of Peoria was 190,985, up from 154,065 in 2010. It is the sixth-largest city in Arizona in land area and the ninth-largest in population. It was named after Peoria, Illinois. The word peoria is a corruption of the Miami-Illinois word for "prairie fire". It is the spring training home of the San Diego Padres and Seattle Mariners, who share Peoria Sports Complex.

== History ==
=== Initial settlement ===
Peoria sits in the Salt River Valley and extends into the foothills of the mountains to the north. William John Murphy, who had worked on the Arizona Canal, recruited settlers to begin a community in Arizona, many of them from Peoria, Illinois. Albert J. and Elizabeth Straw were the first to establish residency in November 1886. They were followed by William T. and Sylvia Hanna, James M. and Clara Copes, and James and Ella McMillan, all from Peoria, Illinois. An old desert road connecting Phoenix to the Hassayampa River near present-day Wickenburg was the only major transportation route in the area until 1887, when a new road was laid out. Named Grand Avenue, this road angled through the newly designed town sites of Alhambra, Glendale, and Peoria and became the main route from Phoenix to Vulture Mine. The settlers filed Peoria's plot map with the Maricopa County recorder on May 24, 1897, naming the settlement after their hometown.

The original plot map of Peoria included east and west streets (from south to north) Monroe, Madison, Jefferson, Washington, Jackson, Lincoln, Grant, and Van Buren. Streets going north and south were (from west to east) Almond (present-day 85th Avenue), Peach (present-day 84th Avenue), Orange (present-day 83rd Avenue), Vine (present-day 82nd Avenue), and Walnut (present-day 81st Avenue). The plot was roughly from present-day Peoria and 85th avenues to Monroe Street and 85th Avenue to Monroe Street and 81st Avenue to 81st Avenue and south of the Desert Cove alignment. On August 4, 1888, the Territory of Peoria was granted a post office in its name and served a population of 27. Maricopa County supervisors defined the boundaries for School District Eleven, covering 49 square miles (130 km^{2}), and the first class took place in an unoccupied brick store that faced north on Washington Street until Peoria's first school building, a one-room structure completed in 1891.

=== Early growth ===
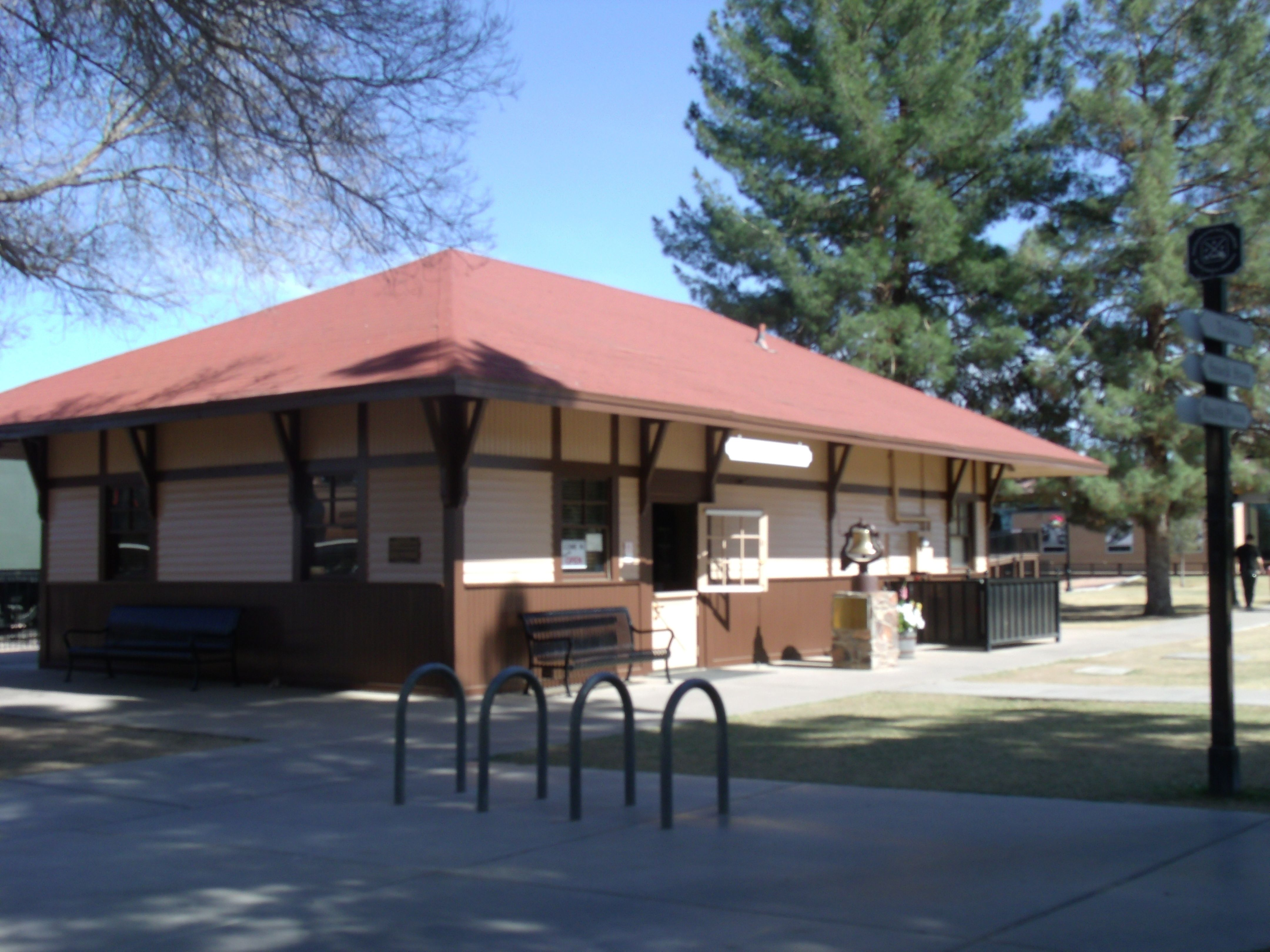
Peoria Railroad Depot, built in 1895

Between 1891 and 1895, a spur line of the Santa Fe, Prescott and Phoenix Railway was placed through Peoria, along with Phoenix, Glendale, Alhambra, Hesperla, and Marinette. Peoria's small depot on 83rd Avenue just off Grand Avenue was purchased by the city of Scottsdale in 1972 and now resides at McCormick-Stillman Railroad Park.

About 1919 the Peoria Chamber of Commerce formed. It operated as the informal government body until Peoria incorporated in 1954. The Peoria volunteer fire district formed in 1920 and remained all volunteer until the mid-1950s. The three-story Edwards Hotel was built in 1918, followed by the Mabel Hood building in May 1920 at the southwest corner of Washington Street and 83rd Avenue. The John L. Meyer or "flatiron" building was completed in June 1920 and the O.O. Fuel's Paramount Theatre in July 1920. (It served as Fire Station 1 from 1950 until 2004.) The town's first newspaper, The Peoria Enterprise, was printed weekly from November 14, 1917, to April 1921.

Peoria's first library was held at the women's club in 1920 until it moved to the old Peoria City Hall in 1975 (where the Peoria Center for the Performing Arts was constructed and currently sits). The library eventually moved to the Peoria Municipal Complex. In May 1959 the Women's Club gave the clubhouse to the City of Peoria.

Central School was built in 1906. By 1910, three additional classroom buildings were built next to the central school, and in 1918 another school building, containing an auditorium and four classrooms, was opened. In 1918, the attendance for Peoria schools was 190. School District Number Eleven was originally an elementary school district. Children going on to high school had to travel to Glendale High School. In 1919, the school board approved construction of Peoria High School.

=== Postwar expansion ===
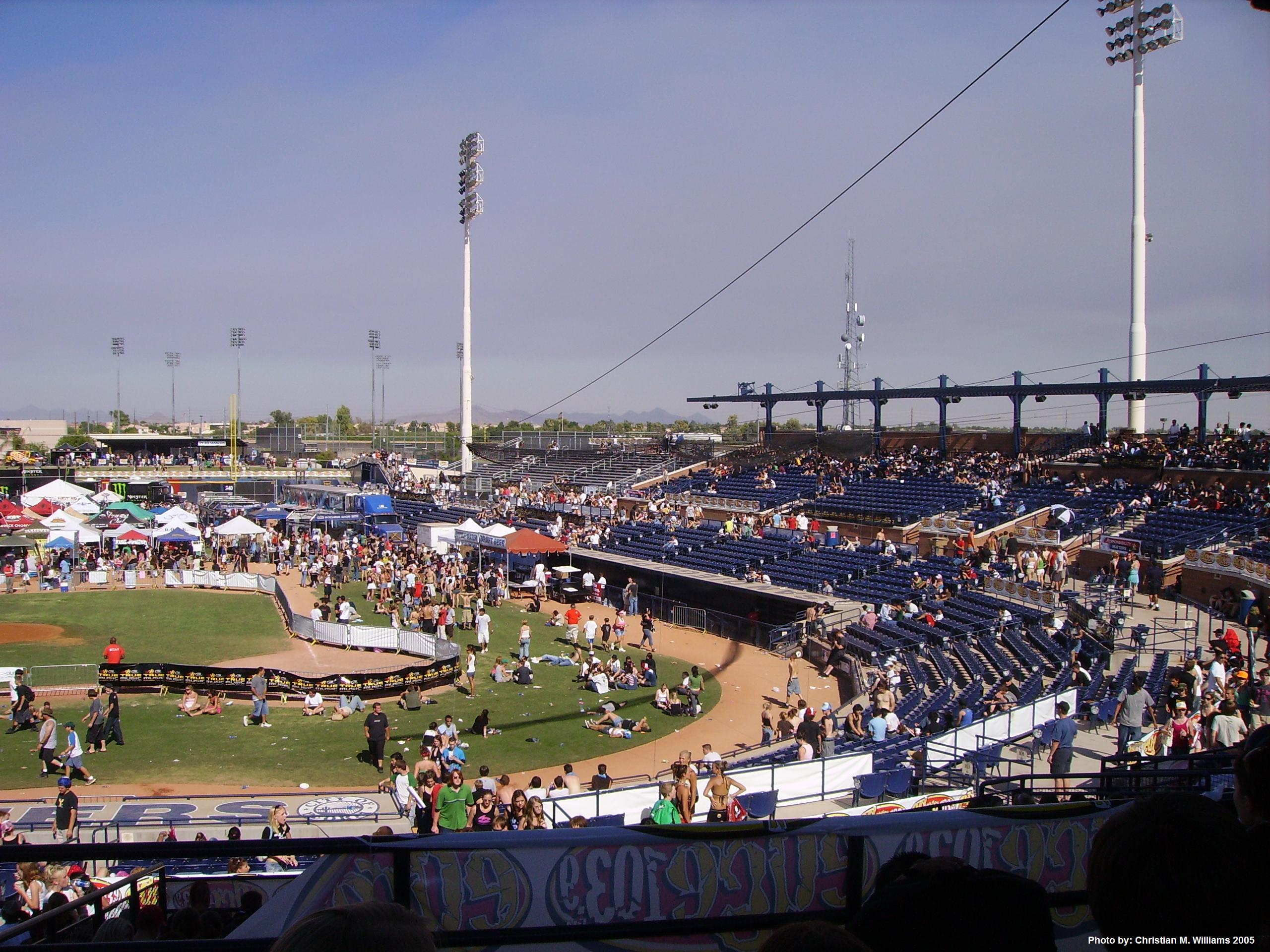
Peoria Sports Complex

Increased economic activity, combined with the presence of Luke Air Force Base and air conditioning, led to an increase in residential housing in Peoria. A postwar construction boom set the stage for Peoria to become a suburb of Phoenix, providing housing for the capital city as growth moved west.

In 1954, Peoria was home to 1,925 residents, with an area of 720 acres (2.9 km^{2}). Peoria incorporated on June 7, 1954. A seven-member city council formed and held its first organizational meeting on June 14. Peoria was named the "Rose Capitol of the World" in 1956. By 1966, Peoria grew to encompass 3.1 square miles (8.0 km^{2}) with 36 miles (58 km) of street. In 1968, the city passed a bond to issue securing the money to build a sewer system, which was completed in 1969. In 1970, Peoria began to transition to paid firefighting staff. From a population of 4,792 in 1970, the city grew to 12,351 in 1980 and 50,675 in 1990. Construction of the $30 million municipal complex began in 1988 at the edge of Peoria's Old Town. The Police Department opened in 1989, the main city hall building and courts in 1991, and the library in 1993.

Spring training has a long history in Peoria. From the late 1970s to 1990, Peoria's Greenway Sports Complex served as a minor league training facility for the Milwaukee Brewers baseball team. This small facility was located at 83rd Avenue and the Greenway Road alignment, the location of the future Peoria Sports Complex. Construction of the new complex was approved in 1990. It was completed in 1994 and was the first Major League Baseball spring training facility in the county shared by two teams. The San Diego Padres and Seattle Mariners utilize the complex year-round for spring training and player development. The Sports Complex was also the short-lived home of the Arizona United for the 2014 season before they relocated to Scottsdale.

In 2005, the city broke ground on the Peoria Center for the Performing Arts, what the city saw as the keystone of the city's “Old Town” area. Mayor at the time, John Keegan, saw the building as the key to the revitalization of the downtown district of Peoria, as well as a much needed cultural center for the northwest valley. The city chose the successful local community theater company, Theater Works, as the facility's anchor tenant, agreeing to a 20-year lease. The performing arts center opened in 2007.

=== Current developments ===
Peoria's identity is more related to resort and leisure living than the past, as that type of lifestyle migrates from the northeast Valley to Peoria. Peoria's economic plan focuses on establishing the “Desert Empire,” a new corridor of industrial, commercial, and mixed development along the Loop 303, especially under mayor, Jason Beck. The building of an Amkor semiconductor plant in the city has bolstered the city’s hopes of this development, with an estimated 2,000 new jobs.

The City of Peoria opened Paloma Community Park on October 3, 2020. The park offers a variety of recreational activities and amenities including fishing, lighted multi-purpose fields, and picnic ramadas.

== Geography ==
Peoria is in northern Maricopa County, with the city limits extending north into Yavapai County.

According to the United States Census Bureau, the city has a total area of 179.2 square miles (464 km^{2}), of which 176.1 square miles (456 km^{2}) are land and 3.2 square miles (8.3 km^{2}), or 1.77%, are water. The water area is due to Lake Pleasant, a reservoir on the Agua Fria River in the northern part of the city, annexed by Peoria in 1996.

The Agua Fria River and New River are the only rivers that flow through Peoria. The Agua Fria River is usually dry due to the New Waddell Dam that holds back Lake Pleasant in the northern end of the city. The New River is usually dry due to flood control measures and New River Dam. There are multiple washes and creeks that flow through the city as well, one of the most significant being Skunk Creek, due to its trails and connectivity with nearby Glendale.

Peoria has many mountains and hills at its northern end. Some include Sunrise Mountain, West Wing Mountain, East Wing Mountain, Calderwood Butte, Cholla Mountain, White Peak, Hieroglyphic Mountains, and Twin Buttes.

=== Climate ===
Peoria has a hot desert climate with mild to warm winters and extremely hot summers.

Climate data for Peoria, Arizona
Month	Jan	Feb	Mar	Apr	May	Jun	Jul	Aug	Sep	Oct	Nov	Dec	Year
Record high °F (°C)	87 (31)	89 (32)	98 (37)	103 (39)	113 (45)	122 (50)	122 (50)	116 (47)	114 (46)	108 (42)	95 (35)	84 (29)	122 (50)
Mean daily maximum °F (°C)	68 (20)	72 (22)	78 (26)	86 (30)	95 (35)	103 (39)	104 (40)	105 (41)	100 (38)	86 (30)	76 (24)	66 (19)	87 (30)
Mean daily minimum °F (°C)	42 (6)	45 (7)	50 (10)	56 (13)	65 (18)	79 (26)	80 (27)	79 (26)	73 (23)	60 (16)	48 (9)	41 (5)	60 (16)
Record low °F (°C)	20 (−7)	24 (−4)	24 (−4)	32 (0)	27 (−3)	51 (11)	62 (17)	54 (12)	48 (9)	35 (2)	28 (−2)	21 (−6)	20 (−7)
Average precipitation inches (mm)	1.04 (26)	1.33 (34)	1.07 (27)	0.33 (8.4)	0.10 (2.5)	0.04 (1.0)	0.92 (23)	1.2 (30)	0.82 (21)	0.61 (15)	0.68 (17)	1.05 (27)	9.19 (231.9)
Source: The Weather Channel

== Demographics ==
Historical population
Census	Pop.	Note	%±
1910	300		—
1920	2,371		690.3%
1930	1,748		−26.3%
1960	2,593		—
1970	4,792		84.8%
1980	12,171		154.0%
1990	50,675		316.4%
2000	108,364		113.8%
2010	154,065		42.2%
2020	190,985		24.0%
2024 (est.)	199,924	▲	4.7%
U.S. Decennial Census

Peoria, Arizona – Racial and ethnic composition Note: the US Census treats Hispanic/Latino as an ethnic category. This table excludes Latinos from the racial categories and assigns them to a separate category. Hispanics/Latinos may be of any race.
Race / Ethnicity (NH = Non-Hispanic)	Pop 2000	Pop 2010	Pop 2020	% 2000	% 2010	% 2020
White alone (NH)	84,370	111,242	126,300	77.86%	72.20%	66.13%
Black or African American alone (NH)	2,887	4,904	7,028	2.66%	3.18%	3.68%
Native American or Alaska Native alone (NH)	579	1,102	1,283	0.53%	0.72%	0.67%
Asian alone (NH)	1,992	4,832	8,557	1.84%	3.14%	4.48%
Pacific Islander alone (NH)	111	195	245	0.10%	0.13%	0.13%
Some Other Race alone (NH)	108	212	767	0.10%	0.14%	0.40%
Mixed Race or Multi-Racial (NH)	1,618	2,949	7,994	1.49%	1.91%	4.19%
Hispanic or Latino (any race)	16,699	28,629	38,811	15.41%	18.58%	20.32%
Total	108,364	154,065	190,985	100.00%	100.00%	100.00%

As of the census of 2000, there were 108,364 people, 39,184 households, and 29,309 families residing in the city. The population density was 784.0 inhabitants per square mile (302.7/km^{2}). There were 42,573 housing units at an average density of 308.0 per square mile (118.9/km^{2}). The racial makeup of the city was 85.0% White, 2.8% Black or African American, 0.7% Native American, 1.9% Asian, 0.1% Pacific Islander, 7.1% from other races, and 2.5% from two or more races. 15.4% of the population were Hispanic or Latino of any race.

There were 39,184 households, out of which 37.7% had children under the age of 18 living with them, 62.0% were married couples living together, 9.1% had a female householder with no husband present, and 25.2% were non-families. 20.5% of all households were made up of individuals, and 10.3% had someone living alone who was 65 years of age or older. The average household size was 2.73 and the average family size was 3.16.

In the city, the population was spread out, with 28.4% under the age of 18, 6.7% from 18 to 24, 30.6% from 25 to 44, 19.8% from 45 to 64, and 14.4% who were 65 years of age or older. The median age was 36 years. For every 100 females, there were 92.5 males. For every 100 females age 18 and over, there were 88.0 males.

The median income for a household in the city was $52,199, and the median income for a family was $58,388. Males had a median income of $40,448 versus $29,205 for females. The per capita income for the city was $22,726. About 3.3% of families and 5.3% of the population were below the poverty line, including 5.8% of those under age 18 and 6.3% of those age 65 or over.

== Economy ==
=== Top employers ===
Top employers in the city of Peoria as of 2022.

#	Employer	# of Employees
1	Peoria Unified School District	2,130
2	City of Peoria	1,800
3	Fry’s Food Store	870
4	Walmart/Sam’s Club	840
5	Freedom Plaza Peoria	530
6	Target	470
7	Safeway	380
8	The Home Depot	370
9	McDonald’s	360
10	Oakcraft Inc.	320

== Arts and culture ==
Peoria's Old Town contains historic buildings. Located there is the Peoria Center for the Performing Arts, opened in 2006, managed by Theater Works.

Peoria has recently redeveloped and marketed the area along 83rd Avenue between Bell Road and Thunderbird Road as an entertainment district dubbed “P83.” Big draws to the area are Peoria Sports Complex, Arizona Broadway Theater, and Harkins Theatres, along with a wide variety of food offerings.

Peoria has a multitude of public art throughout the city, typically most prominently displayed in city parks and populated hubs of the city. The city has utility box art wrap program that feature local artists and student artists.

The City of Peoria has several events throughout the year such as their holiday events (Easter Egg Hunt, Halloween Bash, and Old Town Holiday Festival). The city also hosts other events such as Second Saturday that displays local artists, artisans, vendors, and musicians, and Somos Peoria, a festival that offers visitors to experience the tastes and sounds of traditional Hispanic cultures.

== Parks and recreation ==
Within Peoria's city limits are several hiking and cycling trails, horseback riding opportunities, and views of the surrounding Sonoran Desert.

Lake Pleasant Regional Park is located in Peoria. The lake offers two marinas, kayaking, fishing, camping, and scuba diving.

== Government ==
In November 1983, Peoria citizens voted to require the direct election of the mayor and in 1989, established a city council district system that separated the city into six geographical districts, each of which elects one member of the city council. The council members are elected for four-year terms on a staggered basis. The districts are redrawn after every census. The mayor is elected at-large for a four-year term, which was an amendment to the City Charter approved by voters on March 11, 1997. The current mayor is Jason Beck. The current City Manager is Henry Darwin with Assistant City Manager Rick Buss. The current Chief of Police is Thomas Intrieri and the Fire Chief is Gary Bernard.

== Education ==
Peoria city limits are mostly within the Peoria Unified School District (PUSD), however, some portions of the northeastern end of the city limits are within the Deer Valley Unified School District (DVUSD), portions of the northwestern end of the city are within the Nadaburg Unified School District, and portions of the city in Yavapai County lie within the Wickenburg Unified School District. PUSD has seven high schools, four of which are actually within the city limits of Peoria (the other three are in the city limits of Glendale) including:

PUSD high schools within Peoria:

- Peoria – opened 1922
- Centennial – opened 1990
- Sunrise Mountain – opened 1996
- Liberty – opened 2006

PUSD high schools within Glendale:

- Cactus – opened 1977
- Ironwood – opened 1986
- Raymond S. Kellis – opened 2004

PUSD elementary schools within the city limits are Alta Loma, Apache, Cheyenne, Copperwood, Cotton Boll, Country Meadows, Coyote Hills, Desert Harbor, Frontier, Ira Murphy, Lake Pleasant, Oakwood, Oasis, Parkridge, Paseo Verde, Peoria, Santa Fe, Sky View, Sunset Heights, Sun Valley, Sundance, Vistancia and Zuni Hills. Though the city of Peoria has 23 PUSD elementary schools, some students fall within the boundaries of the other 10 PUSD elementary schools located inside the city of Glendale.

DVUSD schools within the Peoria city limits are Terramar and West Wing Elementary schools.

Additionally, the city is served by numerous publicly funded charter high schools and elementary schools.

Cross of Glory Lutheran School is a Christian Pre-K-8 grade school of the Wisconsin Evangelical Lutheran Synod (WELS) in Peoria.

Trine University opened a branch campus in Peoria in 2013. The Trine campus later closed in 2017.

Huntington University also has a campus in Peoria, opening in August 2016. The school focuses primarily on digital media arts.

== Infrastructure ==
=== Utilities ===
Peoria relies largely on the Central Arizona Project and its canal that diverts water from the city's Lake Pleasant. The city's electrical needs are served primarily by Arizona Public Service, although some customers receive their electricity from the Salt River Project (SRP). The main sources of electrical generation are nuclear and coal power plants. Arizona is home to the Palo Verde Nuclear Generating Station, the largest nuclear-generating facility in the United States. Peoria has also invested heavily in solar photovoltaic throughout the city.

=== Transportation ===
==== Roads and freeways ====
- AZ-74
- Loop 303
- Loop 101
- US 60

A 5.5-mile (8.9 km) stretch of Northern Avenue in Peoria will become part of Northern Parkway between 2023 and 2026.

==== Airports ====
Pleasant Valley Airport is located within city limits.

==== Public transit ====
Peoria is a member of Valley Metro and is served by Valley Metro Bus. Peoria is also a member of WeRIDE, which operates demand-responsive transport in Peoria, Goodyear, Avondale, and Surprise.

== Notable people ==
- Noah Beck, social media personality
- Joshua Becker, minimalist writer
- Kyle Bradish, MLB baseball pitcher (Baltimore Orioles)
- Dylan Cappello, racing driver
- Jaff Decker, professional baseball player
- Bryce Duke, midfielder for CF Montréal in Major League Soccer
- Robert L Fletcher, Arizona citrus producer, created Fletcher Farms and the Cobre Tire Company
- Bob Howry, former professional baseball pitcher
- Kyle Kosier, NFL football player (Dallas Cowboys)
- Debbie Lesko, U.S. representative
- Matthew Liberatore, MLB baseball pitcher St. Louis Cardinals.
- Mary Peters, former U.S. Secretary of Transportation
- Tim Toone, former professional football player
- Benji Gregory, former actor and Brian Tanner on the sitcom ALF, lived in Peoria

== Sister cities ==
Peoria has one sister city : Newtownards, County Down, Northern Ireland.

== See also ==
- Indian Mesa
- List of historic properties in Peoria, Arizona
- Rio Vista Pond
- Weedville, Arizona
