= Westgate Entertainment District =

Mixed-use development in Glendale, Arizona

- Location: Glendale, Arizona
- Coordinates: 33°32′1″N 112°15′43″W
- Opened: November 15, 2006
- Architect: Development Design Group (DDG), The Davis Experience
- Floor area: 508,000 sq ft (47,200 m^{2}) (current); 8,000,000 sq ft (740,000 m^{2}) (projected)
- Website: westgateaz.com

Westgate Entertainment District, formerly known as Westgate City Center is a mixed-use development in Glendale, Arizona. Westgate is described as a super-regional destination for shopping, dining, entertainment, and commercial offices. Funded by millionaire New York architect Ron Elsensohn and anchored by the Desert Diamond Arena, the former home of the NHL team Arizona Coyotes, the complex has 8,000,000 sq ft (740,000 m^{2}) of retail space and is one of the premier entertainment destinations in the region, attracting over 22 million visitors annually. In 2011, the property went into foreclosure and reverted to lenders. The shopping center was reopened under the name Westgate Entertainment District, operated by Vestar Capital Partners, which also manages other properties in the Phoenix area.

== Development ==
Glendale Arizona's Westgate Entertainment District is a 223-acre (0.90 km^{2}), mixed-used development that was originally proposed to include 8,000,000 square feet (740,000 m^{2}) of shopping, dining, entertainment, high-end condominiums, parks, and office space. It is anchored by Desert Diamond Arena, former home of the Arizona Coyotes, and next to State Farm Stadium, home to the NFL's Arizona Cardinals, the Fiesta Bowl and host of Super Bowl XLII, Super Bowl XLIX and Super Bowl LVII.

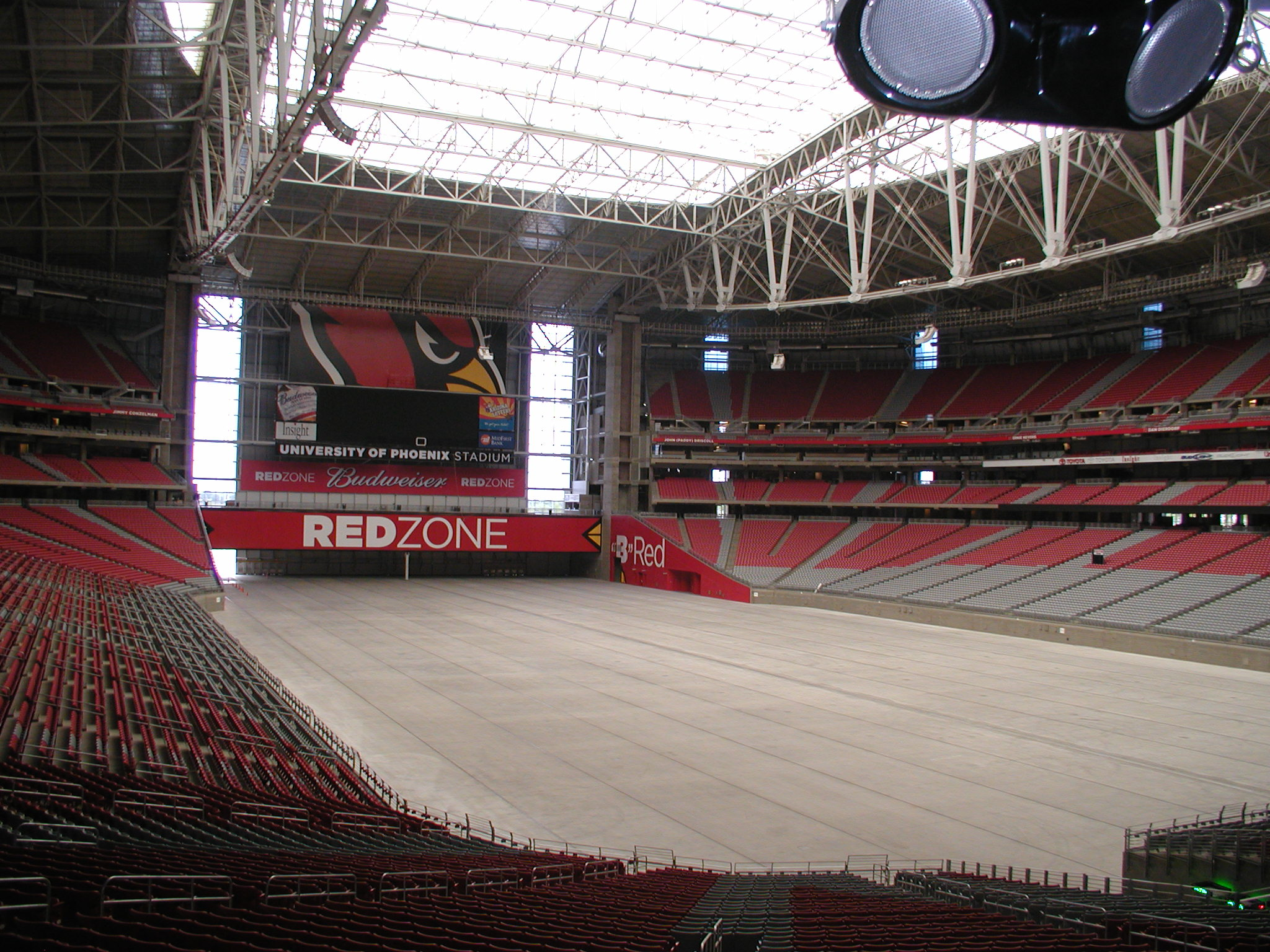
State Farm Stadium is adjacent to Westgate.

Development of Westgate Entertainment District began with the construction of the Desert Diamond Arena, then referred to as the Glendale Arena. Construction of the Arena was completed in late 2003 and it hosted its first NHL game on December 27 of that same year, while construction of the remainder of Westgate's Entertainment District began in October 2005, opening one year later. The Coyotes played their final game in Glendale on April 29, 2022, and rallied from a 4-goal deficit to defeat the Nashville Predators 5 to 4.

The project has been split into multiple phases to facilitate construction and development. Phase I, the initial 510,000-square-foot (47,000 m^{2}) development, opened to the public on November 17, 2006, in limited fashion with only a few restaurants and a sports merchandise store, with other retailers, restaurants and a 20-screen theater opening in the following weeks. Phase I also includes an upmarket 12-story Renaissance Hotel completed in mid-2007, and a convention center, as well as outdoor entertainment facilities. Westgate Entertainment District is now home to more than 30 bars and restaurants as well as a mix of national, regional and local retailers.

Phase II was proposed to add an estimated 436,000-square-foot (40,500 m^{2}) retail destination center and 105,000 square feet (9,800 m^{2}) of "neighborhood retail" to be integrated into a 440-unit residential district.

As of 2022 only a Dave and Busters and some hotels and restaurants have been completed on the perimeter of the Westgate Entertainment District. The development of future phases will be contingent upon market demand and is yet to be scheduled, although original estimated completion dates ranged from 2010 to 2015 at a potential total cost of $1 billion.

== Foreclosure ==
In June 2011, the Westgate Entertainment District development received notices of foreclosure. Part of the reason given for the foreclosure was the uncertainty around the Phoenix Coyotes since the team filed bankruptcy in 2009. The Center remained open. The Steve Ellman companies attempted to reschedule debt on the center to prevent part or all of the center from being be sold to settle debt to lenders. Ellman acquired Westgate in 2006 by swapping his ownership in the Coyotes for Jerry Moyes' ownership share of Westgate. Ellman had moved the Coyotes to Glendale in 2003 from the Footprint Center after failing to get an arena built at the former Los Arcos Mall in Scottsdale. Two auctions were scheduled for foreclosed Entertainment District properties. The first auction, held on September 19, 2011, is for properties securing a $97.5 million loan from iStar Financial. The auction failed to sell at a reserve price of $40 million, and the 33 acres (13 ha) property has become the property of iStar Financial. A second auction was held on November 3, 2011, for properties securing a $202 million loan from Credit Suisse. This is for 95 acres (38 ha), which is currently mostly parking lots. No bidder came forward to purchase the properties for the minimum $25 million price, and the properties were retained by Credit Suisse.

In November 2011, iStar Financial named Vestar Development Company as the new property managers of the complex. At the time, Westgate retail space was 75% leased and office space 50% leased. Vestar is charged with improving the occupancy rate and improving "foot traffic on non-peak days when the arenas are dark". iStar intends to hold onto Westgate for the long-term, and is not looking for a new owner of the property.

== Attractions ==
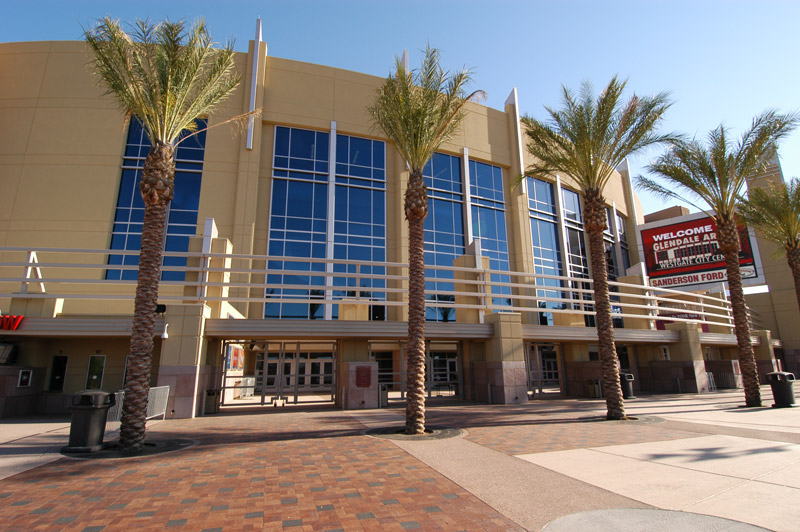
Desert Diamond Arena

Westgate was built around Desert Diamond Arena, which is its primary attraction. Although not a part of the development, State Farm Stadium, home of the Arizona Cardinals, is located directly adjacent to the development. Management of both Westgate and State Farm Stadium have cited their proximity as creating a synergistic boom to the area. Although not within Westgate's borders, the camping, fishing, and hunting retailer Cabela's can be found adjacent to the development and draws visitors to the Westgate Entertainment District each year.

Next to the arena and central to the project is WaterDance Plaza, an events plaza featuring a 60,000-US-gallon (230,000 L; 50,000 imp gal) "dancing fountain" display, costing some $5 million to construct. The fountain was inspired by the more elaborate display at the Bellagio casino in Las Vegas and has been described as "Bellagio-esque.".

Cooperating with media giant Clear Channel Communications, the development also includes 30 large electronic signs, some in excess of 100 feet (30 m). The agglomeration of electronic signage and media boards, said to be the largest "Media & Signage District" west of Times Square has earned it the nickname "Times Square of the West."

== Events ==
As home of the Desert Diamond Arena, a number of events are held at Westgate Entertainment District. Often visitors waiting for events such as concerts, conventions, and sports held in the arenas will spend time in Westgate while waiting for the events to begin. The Center itself is the host of a number of independent events. Westgate hosted its first major event, Westgate Rocks on December 31, 2006, the first premiere New Year's block party to be featured on Phoenix's west side. An estimated 7,500 people attended the party. In addition, Westgate is home to the annual AVP pro volleyball tournament, Action Sports extreme sporting events, Miller Lite Tailgate Parties before Cardinals home games, monthly farmers markets, live entertainment in Fountain Park, and high-end art exhibitions. A small comedy club, Stir Crazy Comedy Club, joined Westgate in 2017.

Westgate has also become home to a number of smaller-scale block parties to cheer on local American Idol contestant Jordin Sparks. Recent block parties related to the show have drawn over 700 people.

The New Year's Eve block party tradition ended in 2011, when the new property managers announced that it would not be held on December 31, 2011. The managers would support restaurants and bars that held parties. The managers increased December holiday events instead.

Westgate served as an overflow area for those attending the memorial service for conservative activist and Arizona resident Charlie Kirk at nearby State Farm Stadium and Desert Diamond Arena following his assassination eleven days prior.

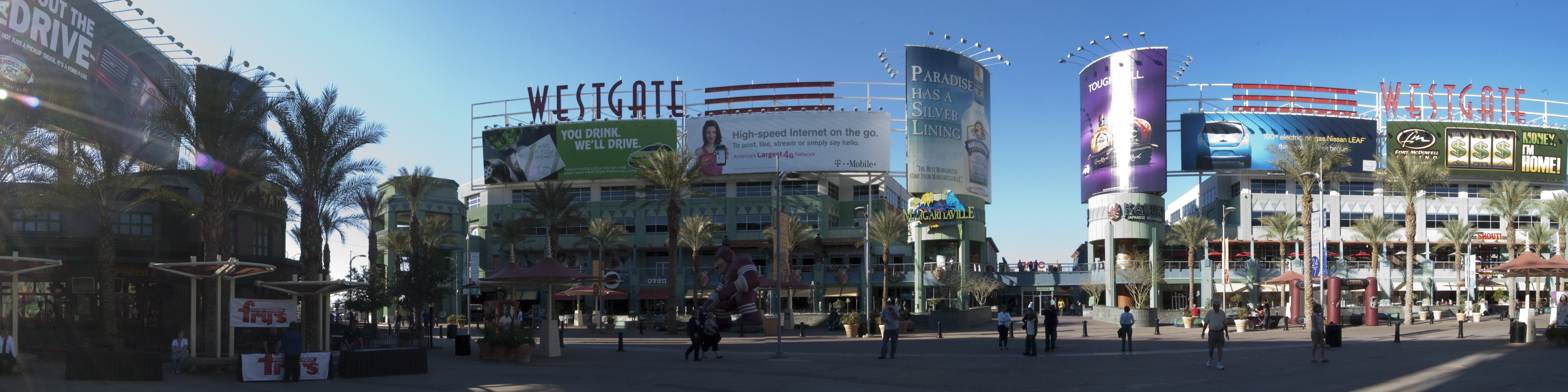
Panoramic view of Westgate City Center from the ground level.
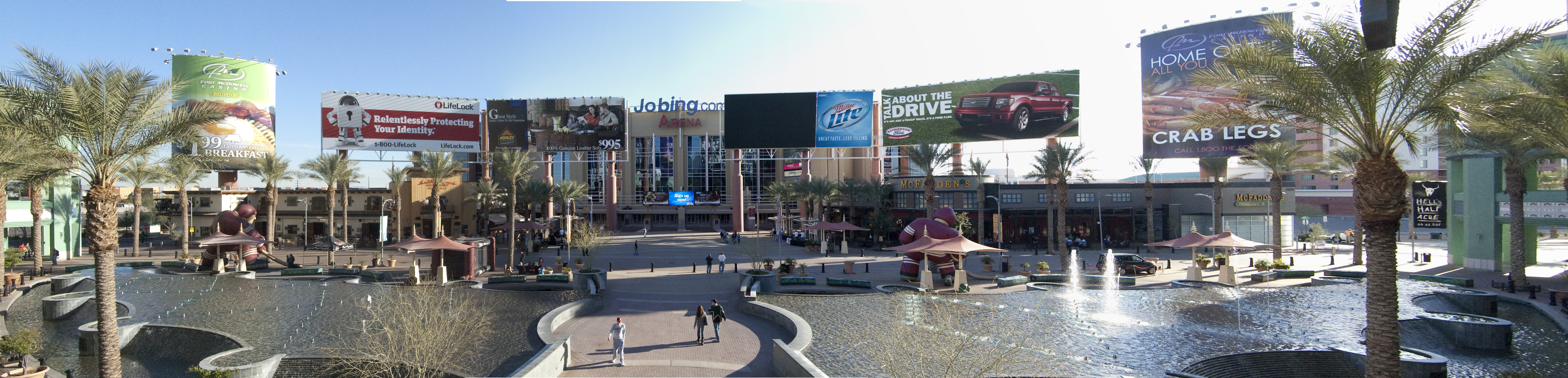
Panoramic view of Westgate City Center from the upper level.

== 2020 shooting ==
On May 20, 2020, a shooting took place at the Westgate Entertainment District. The gunman, armed with a black AR-15 rifle, shot and injured two people in front of a restaurant, fired additional shots, and then shot a third person in a parking lot. He then surrendered to responding police officers. The victims were a 19-year-old man who was critically wounded, a 16-year-old girl who was taken to the hospital with a non-life-threatening condition and a 30-year-old woman who did not require hospitalization.
