= List of places in Arizona (L) =

This is a list of cities, towns, unincorporated communities, counties, and other places in the U.S. state of Arizona, which start with the letter L. This list is derived from the Geographic Names Information System, which has numerous errors, so it also includes many ghost towns and historical places that are not necessarily communities or actual populated places. This list also includes information on the number and names of counties in which the place lies, its lower and upper ZIP code bounds, if applicable, its U.S. Geological Survey (USGS) reference number(s) (called the GNIS), class as designated by the USGS, and incorporated community located in (if applicable).

== L ==
Name of place	Number of counties	Principal county	GNIS #(s)	Class	Located in	ZIP code	
Name of place	Number of counties	Principal county	GNIS #(s)	Class	Located in	Lower	Upper
Laguna	1	Yuma County	25329	Populated Place		85369	
Lake Havasu City	1	Mohave County	2411604	Civil (City)		86403	
Lake Montezuma	1	Yavapai County	2408544	CDP		86342	
Lake of the Woods	1	Navajo County	2582812	CDP			
Lakeside	1	Navajo County	30856	Populated Place	Pinetop-Lakeside	85929	
Lakeview	1	Coconino County	30857	Populated Place		86038	
La Palma	1	Pinal County	6811	Populated Place		85222	
La Paz Valley	1	La Paz County	2582813	CDP			
Lapham	1	Yavapai County	38562	Populated Place			
Las Guijas	1	Pima County	24489	Populated Place			
Laveen	1	Maricopa County	6920	Populated Place	Phoenix	85339	
Lazy Y U	1	Mohave County	2582814	CDP			
Lechee	1	Coconino County	2408596	CDP			
Lehi	1	Maricopa County	6971	Populated Place	Mesa		
Leisure World	1	Maricopa County	43536	Populated Place		85201	
Leupp	1	Coconino County	2408602	CDP		86035	
Lewis Springs	1	Cochise County	24493	Populated Place			
Liberty	1	Maricopa County	6992	Populated Place		85326	
Ligurta	1	Yuma County	24494	Populated Place		85356	
Linden	1	Navajo County	2582815	CDP			
Litchfield Park	1	Maricopa County	2410842	Civil (City)		85340	
Little Acres	1	Gila County	31025	Populated Place		85501	
Littlefield	1	Mohave County	2582816	CDP		86432	
Littletown	1	Pima County	2408621	CDP			
Lizard	1	Maricopa County	24498	Populated Place			
Lizard Acres	1	Maricopa County	7245	Populated Place	Sun City West	85374	
Lochiel	1	Santa Cruz County	31163	Populated Place		85624	
Lone Star	1	Graham County	7310	Populated Place		85546	
Lost Eden	1	Coconino County	31299	Populated Place			
Lowell	1	Cochise County	7442	Populated Place		85603	
Lower Santan Village	1	Pinal County	2612140	CDP			
Lower Wheatfields	1	Apache County	24500	Populated Place			
Low Mountain	1	Navajo County	2582817	CDP		86503	
Lukachukai	1	Apache County	2408152	CDP		86507	
Luke Air Force Base	1	Maricopa County	2512266	Military		85309	
Lukeville	1	Pima County	7544	Populated Place		85341	
Lupton	1	Apache County	2582818	CDP		86508	
