= Sun City, Arizona =

Retirement community city in Arizona, United States

- Census-designated place
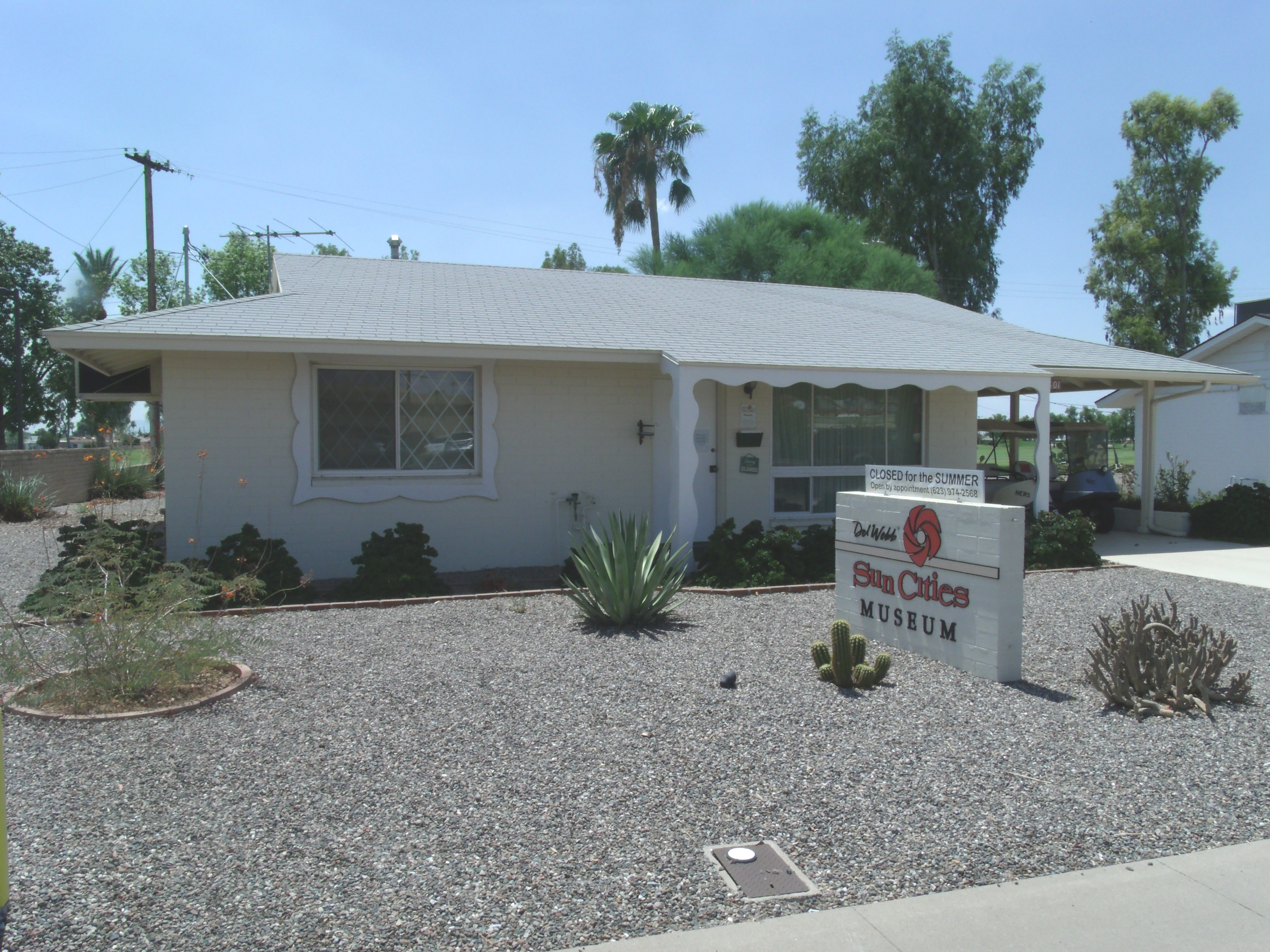
- The Sun City DEVCO Model #1

- Flag

- Location in Maricopa County, Arizona

- Location within Arizona Location within the United States
- Coordinates: 33°37′41″N 112°16′53″W
- Country: United States
- State: Arizona
- County: Maricopa

Area
  - Total: 14.59 sq mi (37.80 km^{2})
  - Land: 14.42 sq mi (37.35 km^{2})
  - Water: 0.17 sq mi (0.45 km^{2})
- Elevation: 1,168 ft (356 m)

Population (2020)
  - Total: 39,931
  - Density: 2,769.1/sq mi (1,069.16/km^{2})
- Time zone: UTC-7 (Mountain (MST))
- ZIP codes: 85351, 85372-85375, 85379, 85387
- Area code: 623
- FIPS code: 04-70320
- GNIS feature ID: 2410022

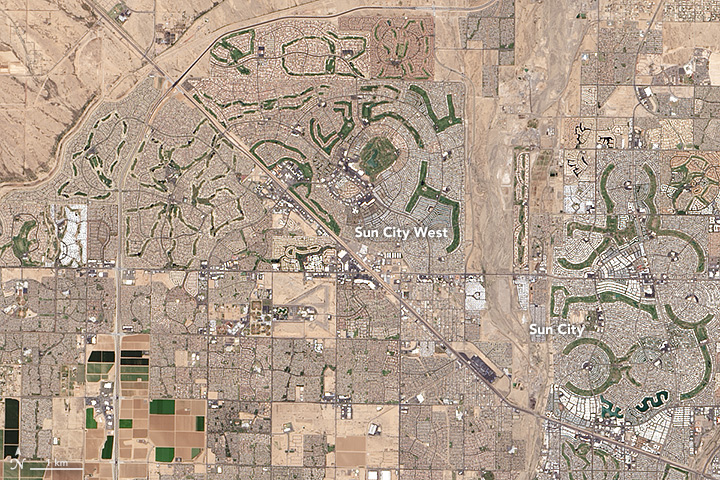
Sun City and Sun City West from Landsat 8, 2016

Sun City is an unincorporated community and census-designated place in Maricopa County, Arizona, United States, that is located within the Phoenix metropolitan area.

The population was 39,931 as of the 2020 census. Its adjoining sister city is Sun City West. Both Sun Cities are retirement communities popular with snowbirds.

== History ==
In June 1959, James G. Boswell II, then owner of the J.G. Boswell Company, sold the company’s Marinette and Santa Fe ranches to Del E. Webb Development Co for more than $20 million. This land, totaling 20,000 acres, would become the company’s first retirement community, Sun City.

Sun City was opened January 1, 1960, with five home models, a shopping center, a recreation center, and a golf course. The opening weekend drew 100,000 people, ten times more than expected, and resulted in a Time magazine cover story. The future retirement community was built on the site of the former ghost town of Marinette. At first it was called the Marinette Retirement Community, but after a nationwide naming contest in which the winner would win a house, developer Del Webb selected the name Sun City.

Developer Del E. Webb expanded Sun City over the years, and his company went on to build other retirement communities in the Sun Belt. Sun City West was built in the late 1970s, Sun City Grand in the late 1990s, Sun City Anthem in 1999, and Sun City Festival in July 2006.

The community is well known to law students, as it is featured in the case Spur Industries, Inc. v. Del E. Webb Development Co., 494 P.2d 700 (Ariz. 1972), commonly used in first-year property law courses to illustrate nuisance law.

The community's street network design consists largely of concentric circles in four main pinwheels.

== Geography ==
Sun City is located 16 miles (26 km) northwest of downtown Phoenix. It is bordered to the north, east, and south by the city of Peoria, to the southwest by Youngtown, to the west by El Mirage, and to the northwest by Surprise.

According to the United States Census Bureau, the Sun City CDP has a total area of 14.6 square miles (38 km^{2}), of which 14.4 square miles (37 km^{2}) are land and 0.2 square miles (0.5 km^{2}), or 1.19%, are water.

=== Climate ===
Climate data for Youngtown, Arizona, 1991–2020 normals, extremes 1964–present
Month	Jan	Feb	Mar	Apr	May	Jun	Jul	Aug	Sep	Oct	Nov	Dec	Year
Record high °F (°C)	87 (31)	89 (32)	98 (37)	104 (40)	113 (45)	122 (50)	122 (50)	116 (47)	114 (46)	108 (42)	95 (35)	84 (29)	122 (50)
Mean maximum °F (°C)	77.8 (25.4)	81.0 (27.2)	89.8 (32.1)	98.5 (36.9)	105.3 (40.7)	112.2 (44.6)	114.4 (45.8)	112.8 (44.9)	108.4 (42.4)	99.9 (37.7)	87.6 (30.9)	76.2 (24.6)	115.5 (46.4)
Mean daily maximum °F (°C)	65.4 (18.6)	68.9 (20.5)	76.5 (24.7)	84.1 (28.9)	92.9 (33.8)	102.2 (39.0)	104.9 (40.5)	103.6 (39.8)	98.4 (36.9)	87.0 (30.6)	73.9 (23.3)	63.8 (17.7)	85.1 (29.5)
Daily mean °F (°C)	53.3 (11.8)	56.4 (13.6)	62.7 (17.1)	69.5 (20.8)	78.3 (25.7)	87.2 (30.7)	92.3 (33.5)	91.4 (33.0)	85.4 (29.7)	73.2 (22.9)	60.8 (16.0)	52.0 (11.1)	71.9 (22.2)
Mean daily minimum °F (°C)	41.1 (5.1)	43.8 (6.6)	48.9 (9.4)	54.8 (12.7)	63.6 (17.6)	72.2 (22.3)	79.7 (26.5)	79.2 (26.2)	72.5 (22.5)	59.5 (15.3)	47.7 (8.7)	40.2 (4.6)	58.6 (14.8)
Mean minimum °F (°C)	32.1 (0.1)	35.5 (1.9)	40.4 (4.7)	46.1 (7.8)	53.9 (12.2)	64.0 (17.8)	71.5 (21.9)	71.4 (21.9)	63.1 (17.3)	49.3 (9.6)	37.4 (3.0)	30.8 (−0.7)	29.4 (−1.4)
Record low °F (°C)	20 (−7)	24 (−4)	24 (−4)	32 (0)	38 (3)	51 (11)	62 (17)	54 (12)	48 (9)	35 (2)	28 (−2)	21 (−6)	20 (−7)
Average precipitation inches (mm)	0.98 (25)	1.25 (32)	1.03 (26)	0.29 (7.4)	0.11 (2.8)	0.03 (0.76)	0.84 (21)	0.97 (25)	0.74 (19)	0.59 (15)	0.61 (15)	0.90 (23)	8.34 (212)
Average precipitation days	3.5	4.0	3.5	1.5	1.0	0.4	2.9	3.7	2.4	2.2	1.9	3.8	30.8
Source: NOAA

== Demographics ==
Historical population
Census	Pop.	Note	%±
1970	13,670		—
1980	40,505		196.3%
1990	38,126		−5.9%
2000	38,309		0.5%
2010	37,499		−2.1%
2020	39,931		6.5%

=== Racial and ethnic composition ===
Sun City CDP, Arizona – Racial composition Note: the US Census treats Hispanic/Latino as an ethnic category. This table excludes Latinos from the racial categories and assigns them to a separate category. Hispanics/Latinos may be of any race.
Race (NH = Non-Hispanic)	2020	2010	2000	1990	1980
White alone (NH)	90.1% (35,989)	94.4% (35,409)	97.7% (37,420)	99.1% (37,801)	99.6% (40,415)
Black alone (NH)	1.8% (723)	1.4% (520)	0.5% (193)	0.2% (62)	0% (6)
American Indian alone (NH)	0.3% (113)	0.2% (74)	0.1% (45)	0.1% (26)	0% (14)
Asian alone (NH)	1.1% (425)	0.6% (237)	0.3% (115)	0.1% (43)	0.1% (45)
Pacific Islander alone (NH)	0% (18)	0% (10)	0% (8)		
Other race alone (NH)	0.3% (102)	0% (13)	0% (4)	0% (3)	0% (0)
Multiracial (NH)	1.9% (770)	0.5% (202)	0.4% (141)	—	—
Hispanic/Latino (any race)	4.5% (1,791)	2.8% (1,034)	1% (383)	0.5% (191)	0.2% (96)

=== 2020 census ===
As of the 2020 census, Sun City had a population of 39,931. The median age was 72.6 years. 1.2% of residents were under the age of 18 and 75.7% of residents were 65 years of age or older. For every 100 females there were 74.3 males, and for every 100 females age 18 and over there were 74.0 males age 18 and over.

100.0% of residents lived in urban areas, while 0.0% lived in rural areas.

There were 24,468 households in Sun City, of which 1.8% had children under the age of 18 living in them. Of all households, 41.4% were married-couple households, 16.1% were households with a male householder and no spouse or partner present, and 38.7% were households with a female householder and no spouse or partner present. About 45.9% of all households were made up of individuals and 38.9% had someone living alone who was 65 years of age or older.

There were 28,344 housing units, of which 13.7% were vacant. The homeowner vacancy rate was 1.7% and the rental vacancy rate was 8.3%.

Racial composition as of the 2020 census
Race	Number	Percent
White	36,511	91.4%
Black or African American	740	1.9%
American Indian and Alaska Native	135	0.3%
Asian	443	1.1%
Native Hawaiian and Other Pacific Islander	20	0.1%
Some other race	564	1.4%
Two or more races	1,518	3.8%
Hispanic or Latino (of any race)	1,791	4.5%

=== 2000 census ===
According to the census of 2000, there were 38,309 people, 23,490 households, and 12,520 families residing in the CDP. The population density was 2,639.5 inhabitants per square mile (1,019.1/km^{2}). There were 27,731 housing units at an average density of 1,910.7 per square mile (737.7/km^{2}). The racial makeup of the CDP was 98.4% White, 0.5% Black or African American, 0.1% Native American, 0.3% Asian, <0.1% Pacific Islander, 0.2% from other races, and 0.4% from two or more races. One percent (1.0%) of the population were Hispanic or Latino of any race.

There were 23,490 households, out of which 0.3% had children under the age of 18 living with them, 49.5% were married couples living together, 3.0% had a female householder with no husband present, and 46.7% were nonfamilies. Individuals comprised 44.1% of all households, and 39.4% had someone living alone who was 65 years of age or older. The average household size was 1.60 and the average family size was 2.07.

In the CDP, 0.4% of the population were under the age of 18, 0.3% from 18 to 24, 2.0% from 25 to 44, 17.5% from 45 to 64, and 79.8% were 65 years of age or older. The median age was 75 years. For every 100 females age 18 and over, there were 69.8 males.

The median income for a household in the CDP was $32,508, and the median income for a family was $40,464. Males had a median income of $35,459 versus $26,453 for females. The per capita income for the CDP was $25,935. About 2.5% of families and 4.6% of the population were below the poverty line, including none of those under age 18 and 4.3% of those age 65 or over.

== Sports and recreation ==
Sun City has eight golf courses and seven recreational centers, and is home to the Sun Bowl Amphitheatre. Sun City's four lawn bowling locations were among the sites for the 2019 US Lawn Bowling Open’s South Central Division. A ballpark, Sun City Stadium, opened in 1971 and served as the spring training home of the Milwaukee Brewers from 1973 to 1985. Other teams to play their home games at the ballpark include the Sun City Rays of the Senior Professional Baseball Association in 1990, and the Mesa Solar Sox of the Arizona Fall League during 1992–1993. The ballpark was razed in 1995.

== Transportation ==
Sun City is served by Valley Metro Bus routes 106 and 138.

== Education ==
All of Sun City is in unorganized school district territory, or in other words, not in any school district. Sun City Home Owners Association (SCHOA) led a political effort so that the area is not in any school district as a way of reducing taxation. K-12 students who live in Sun City are able to attend other schools within the Peoria Unified School District and the neighboring Dysart Unified School District. Zuni Hills Elementary School of Peoria USD has a postal address stating "Sun City, AZ".

== Notable residents ==
- Paul Casimir Marcinkus GCOIH (/mɑːrˈsɪŋkəs/; January 15, 1922 – February 20, 2006) was an American archbishop of the Catholic Church and president of the Institute for the Works of Religion, commonly known as the Vatican Bank, from 1971 to 1989. Widely considered as one of the most influential and controversial Vatican officials in the 1970's.
- Carl T. Burgess (April 22, 1911 – September 5, 1994), speaker of the South Dakota House of Representatives

== Gallery ==
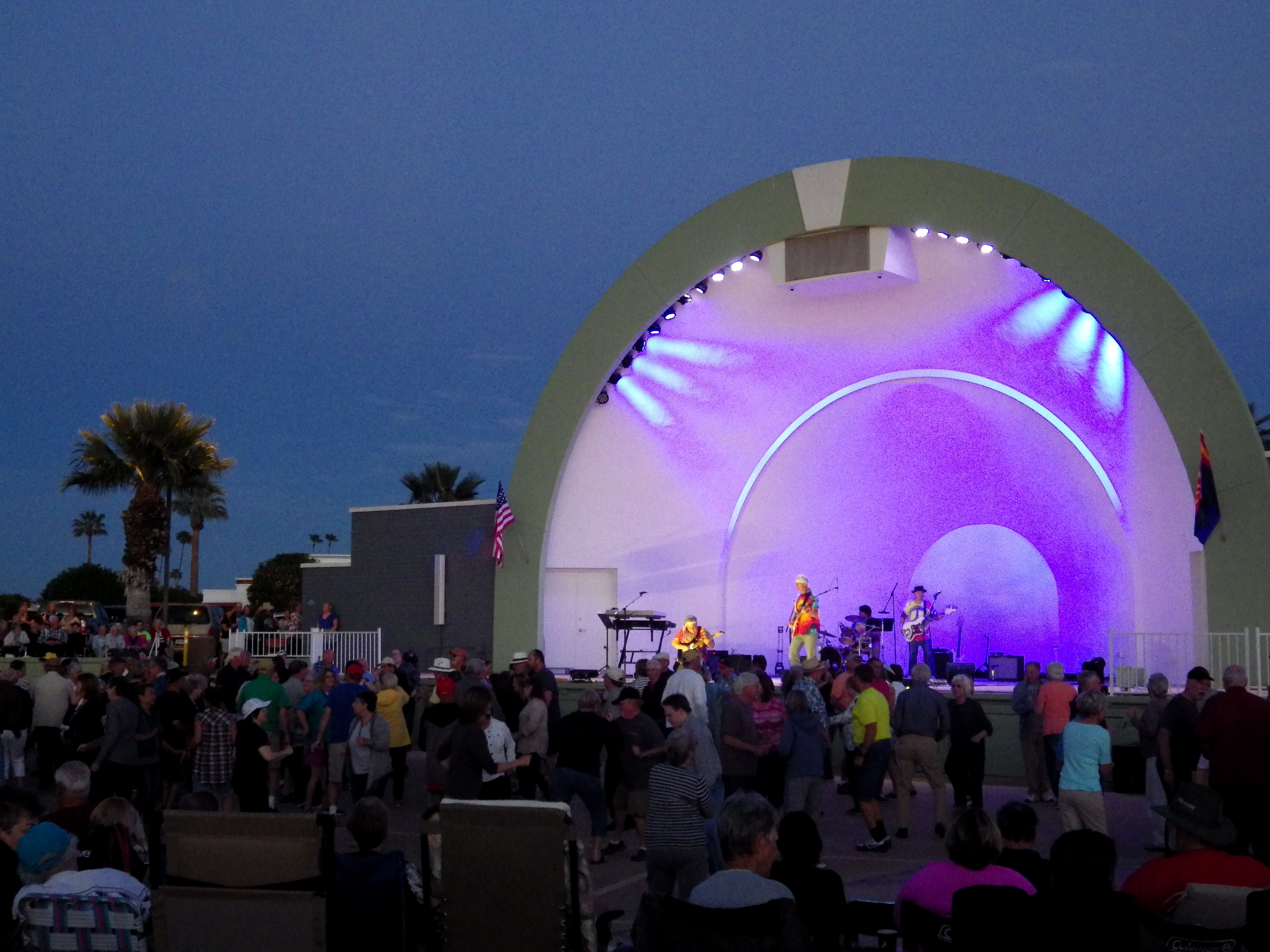
Concert at the Sun Bowl March 11, 2018

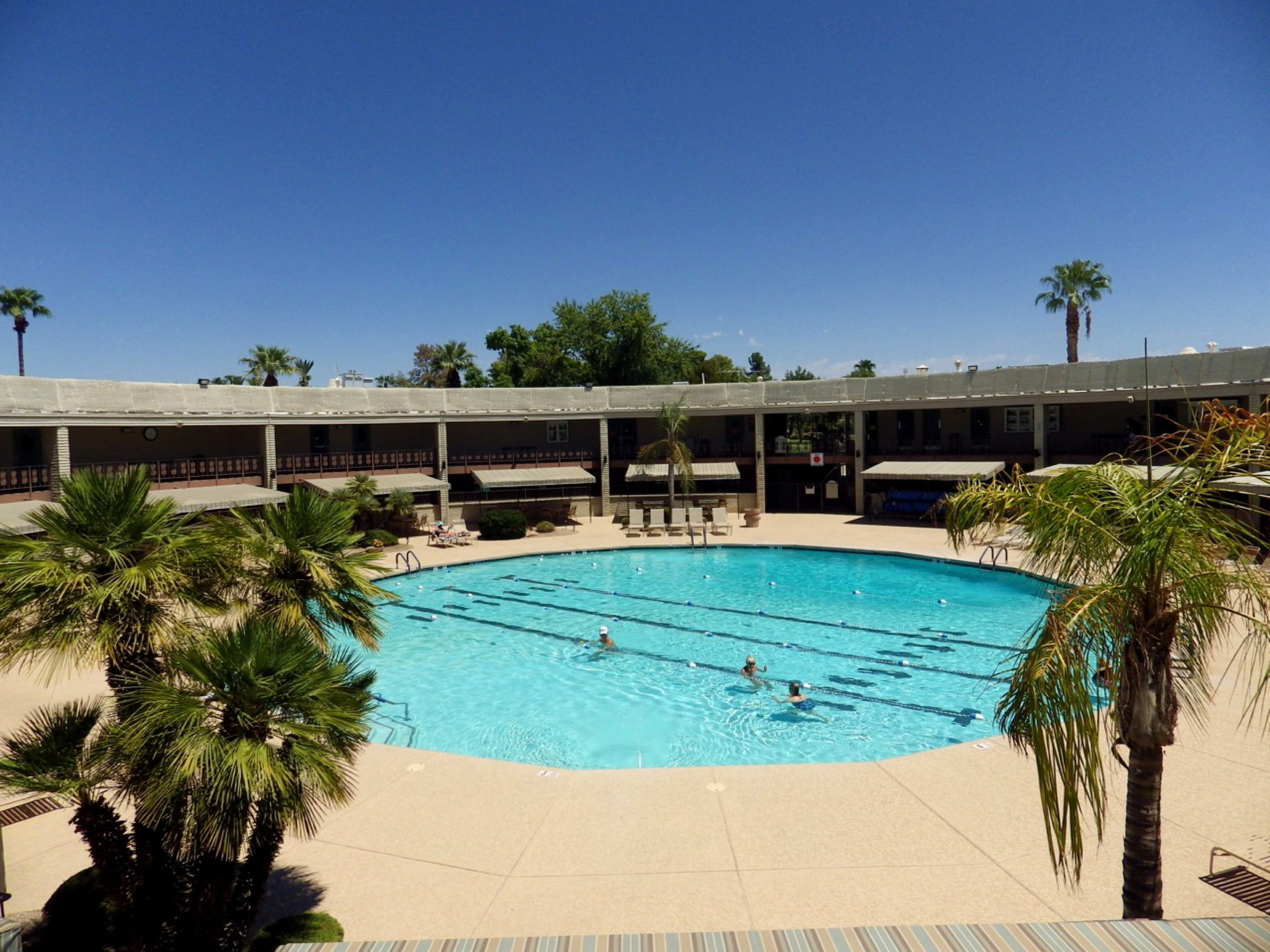
Lakeview Recreation Center swimming pool

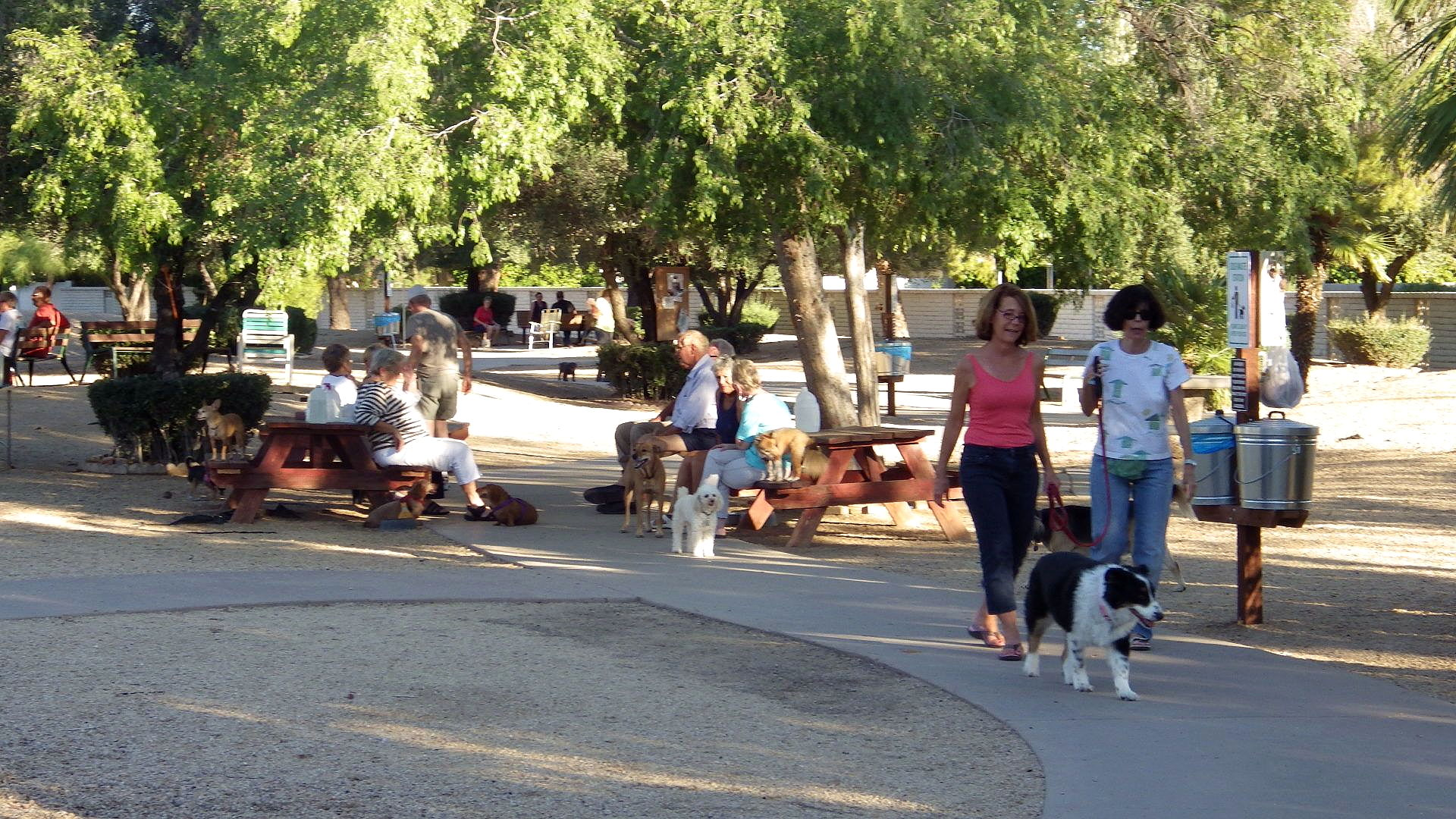
Duffeeland Dog Park

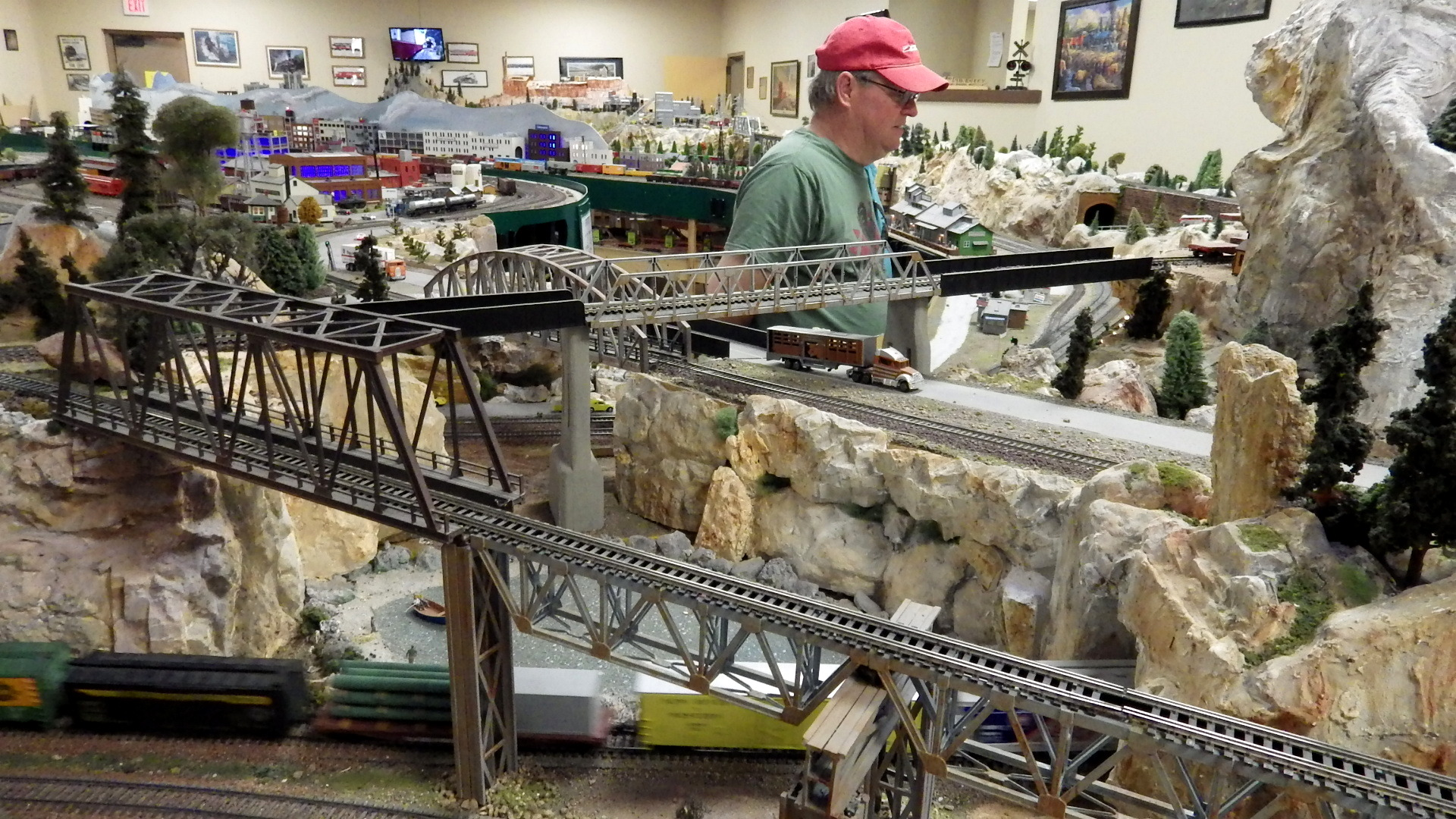
Railway Club

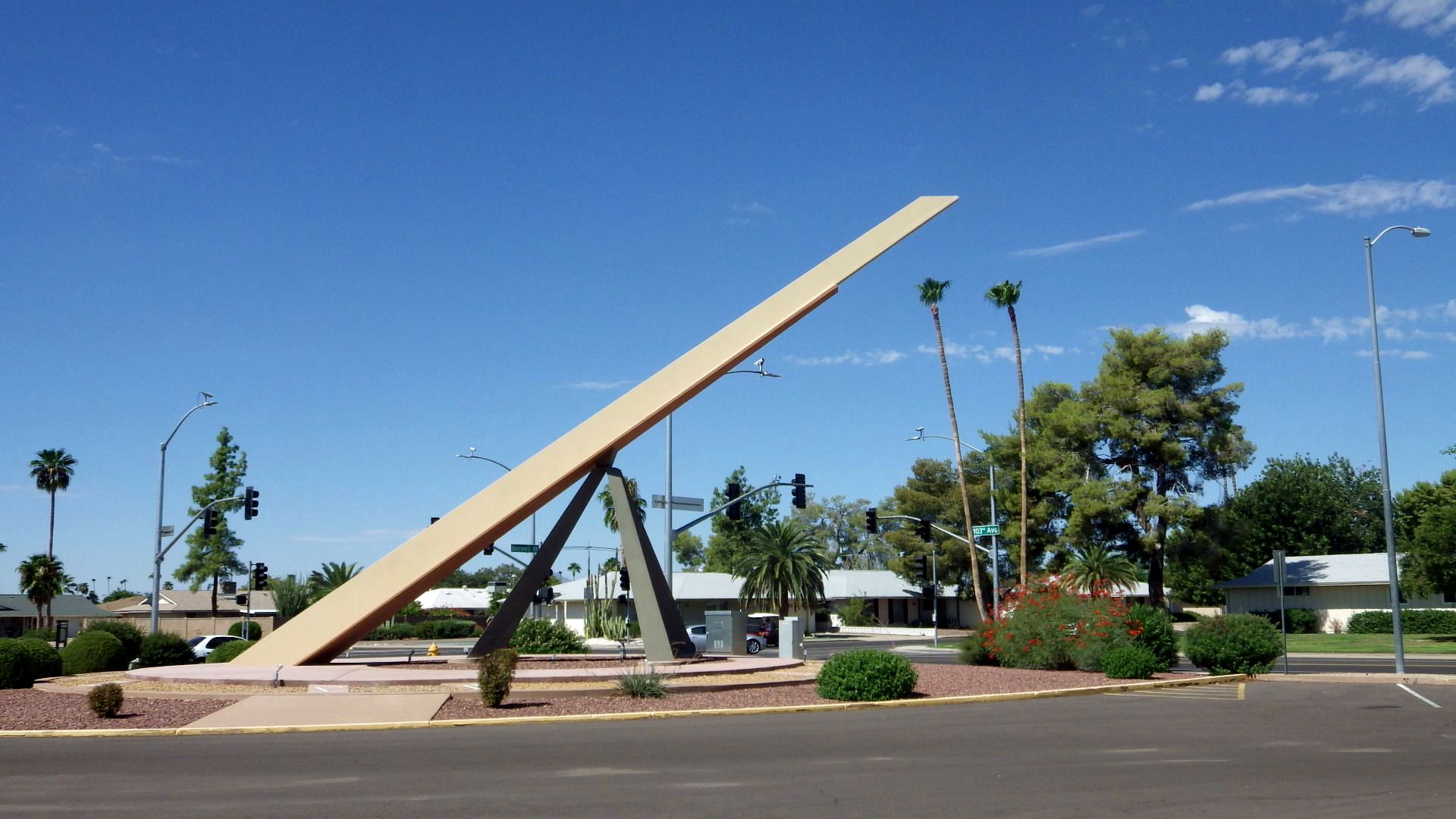
Plaque reads: "Sun City Sundial /One of the largest /Horizontal Sundials in America /Gnomon: 36' high, 64' long /Constructed 1973 /(Renovated 2011)"

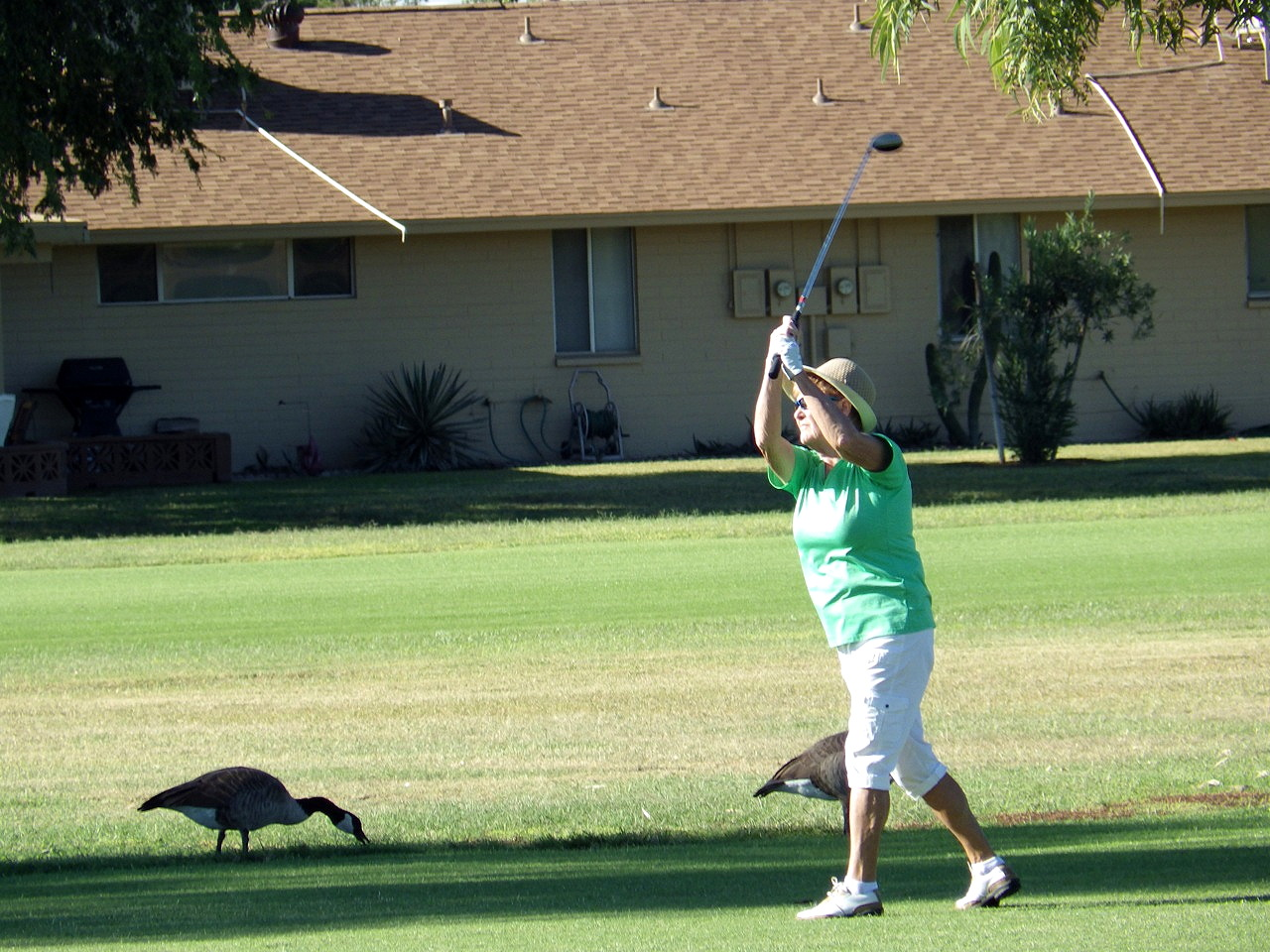
Golfing in Sun City

== See also ==
- Sun City Festival, also in Maricopa County
- Sun City, Menifee, California
