= Property Rules, Liability Rules and Inalienability: One View of the Cathedral =

1972 law essay

Property Rules, Liability Rules and Inalienability: One View of the Cathedral is an article in the scholarly legal literature (Harvard Law Review, Vol.85(6), pp. 1089-1128, April 1972), authored by Judge Guido Calabresi (of the United States Court of Appeals for the Second Circuit) and A. Douglas Melamed, currently a professor at Stanford Law School.

The article is a seminal contribution to the field of law and economics, offering an ambitious attempt to treat various areas of the law through a uniform approach. It is grounded in the fact that the various interests created by the law enjoy various degrees and methods of protection. Certain interests are deemed human rights and inalienable as such. Other interests are protected by the criminal law, meaning that the state will bear the cost of initiating legal action if violations of such interests are brought to its attention; here begins the criminal law. The burden of proof required for the state to prevail in such cases is higher; thus the beginning of criminal procedure. Other interests give an injured party merely the option of petitioning for injunctive relief. There are still other interests whose violations give the injured party no more than the right to seek monetary damages, and only if the victim is willing to bear the costs of initiating legal action; such interests make up the essence of civil law. The burden of proof in such cases is less than in actions initiated under criminal law; thus the beginning of civil procedure.

== Thesis ==
The title of the article references artist Claude Monet's series of paintings of Rouen Cathedral, implying that the authors' ensuing academic analysis is but one look at a subject that can be considered from various points of view. The primary thesis of the article focuses on the notion of "entitlements," or rights, which can be protected by either property, liability, or inalienability rules. The authors' main goal, as noted in the Introduction, is to provide a conceptual framework within which the separate legal subject areas of Property and Torts can be approached from a unified perspective. The article then undertakes an analysis of the classic Law and Economics "Pollution Problem" and an analysis of various criminal sanctions, all within the new framework the authors have put forth.

== The Concept of Entitlements ==
The article begins by discussing the crucial concept of "entitlements," which are defined as the rights established and protected by law, the absence of which would result in a "might makes right" world where either the strongest or shrewdest emerge victorious in any conflict. Thus, as the authors point out, the fundamental thing that law (the setting of entitlements) does is to decide which of the conflicting parties will be entitled to prevail. The authors also point out, however, that successfully enforcing these entitlements (the law) is as important as establishing them in order to avoid the "might makes right" world. From this notion, the authors consider three types of entitlements: entitlements protected by property rules, entitlements protected by liability rules, and inalienable entitlements. According to Calabresi and Melamed, an entitlement protected by a property rule is one that must be bought in a voluntary transaction in which the value of the entitlement is agreed upon by the buyer and seller. With an entitlement protected by property rule, a collective decision is made as to who is to be given the initial entitlement, but not as to the value of the entitlement itself. An entitlement protected by a liability rule, however, involves a collective decision as to the value of the entitlement without the need for a voluntary transaction. A destroyer of an initial entitlement protected by a liability rule must pay an objectively valued sum to the holder of the entitlement. The final entitlement the authors consider in the article is an entitlement protected by an inalienability rule. As the authors define it, an entitlement is inalienable to the extent that its transfer is not permitted between a willing buyer and a willing seller. Under this rule, the state intervenes to determine the initial entitlement, to forbid its sale or purchase, and to determine compensation to be paid if it is sold or destroyed. To conceptualize these three entitlements, the authors use the example of an individual homeowner whose house may be protected by a property rule where another individual wishes to purchase it, a liability rule where the government seizes the home by eminent domain, or an inalienability rule where the homeowner is drunk or incompetent. Having defined the concept of entitlements and laid out the three rules that they will focus on, the article proceeds to explore the following two questions: (1) In what circumstances should a particular entitlement be granted? And, (2) In what circumstances should a property, liability or inalienability rule be used to protect an entitlement?

== The Birth of Rule 4 ==
In answering these questions, Calabresi and Melamed expanded upon the pre-existing Law and Economics literature and added to the discussion the breakthrough that has come to be known as "Rule 4." In keeping with the classic Law and Economics hypothetical of the Polluter and the Resident (whereby P (Polluter)'s affirmative actions have encroached upon R (Resident)'s passive enjoyment of his property), the authors advocate a novel approach to the problem whereby a court might permit Polluter to continue his actions unless Resident chose to pay Polluter damages in order to enjoin further pollution. Modeled along with the traditional Law and Economics approaches to the Polluter / Resident problem, the scheme of available remedies appears thus:

Initial Entitlement	Injunction / Property Rule	Damages / Liability Rule
Resident	Rule 1: Court issues an injunction against Polluter	Rule 2: Court finds a nuisance but permits pollution to continue if the Polluter chooses to pay damages
Polluter	Rule 3: Court finds the pollution not to be a nuisance and permits the Polluter to continue without paying damages	Rule 4: Court permits Polluter to continue unless Resident chooses to pay Polluter damages in order to enjoin further pollution

Coincidentally, at approximately the same time that Calabresi and Melamed postulated their Rule 4 as an additional approach to the Polluter / Resident problem, an Arizona state supreme court decision independently illustrated the practical application of the "Rule 4" approach in deciding a case that had come before the court. In 1972 in Spur Industries, Inc. v. Del E. Webb Development Co., Del Webb, an Arizona real-estate developer developing a retirement community, sued for an injunction against Spur Industries, a pre-existing feedlot owner whose activities resulted in an alleged nuisance to the encroaching retirement community (causing Del Webb difficulties in selling properties close to the feedlot). In handing down its decision, the Arizona state Supreme Court ruled that Spur Industries' activities did create a nuisance, but Del Webb had come to the nuisance and brought its unwitting retirees along with it. Balancing the various factors in the case, including the fact that Del Webb but not Spur Industries could have foreseen the nuisance problem and the fact that the residents of the retirement community had been dragged to the nuisance unwittingly, the court ruled that Spur Industries would be forced to move, but that Del Webb had to indemnify the business for its troubles.

Though independent of Calabresi and Melamed's article, Spur Industries proved that "Rule 4's" novel approach could be practicably applied. Furthermore, Spur Industries showed that a successful balancing of efficiency, distributional, and other justice concerns, concerns articulated in the article that Calabresi and Melamed intended Rule 4 to blend, could be achieved.
