= Sun City Stadium =

Former baseball park in Arizona

- Location: 111th Avenue & Grand Avenue; Sun City, Arizona, U.S. (Note: Vintage postcards of the stadium can be found online, which note an address of 13440 North 111 Avenue.)
- Owner: Del E. Webb Construction (1971–1983)
- Capacity: 3,500 (initial); 5,500 (at closure)
- Surface: Grass
- Field size: Left field: 340 feet (100 m); Center field: 425 feet (130 m); Right field: 370 feet (110 m)
- Acreage: 12.5 acres (5.1 ha)

Construction
- Opened: 1971
- Demolished: 1995
- Builder: Del E. Webb Construction

Tenants
- Mesa Solar Sox (AFL) (1992–1993); Sun City Rays (SPBA) (1990); Milwaukee Brewers (MLB) (spring training; 1973–1985)

Sun City Stadium was a baseball park located in Sun City, Arizona, from 1971 until the mid-1990s. It was built by developer Del Webb, and served as the spring training home of the Milwaukee Brewers of Major League Baseball (MLB) from 1973 to 1985. The park was dismantled in early 1995, and a retirement community was subsequently built on the site.

== History ==
The park was dedicated on June 17, 1971, with the Sun City Saints, a women's softball team, winning a doubleheader from the Huntington Park Bluejays. In March 1972, the San Francisco Giants played several spring training games at the facility, including two against the Tokyo Orions. The first spring training game was held at the stadium on March 13, as the Giants were defeated by the San Diego Padres, 9–4. The Giants' lineup included Bobby Bonds, Dave Kingman, Garry Maddox, Gary Matthews, Willie Mays, and Willie McCovey. The stadium also hosted several college baseball games that month.

The Milwaukee Brewers moved their spring training from Tempe to Sun City in 1973, at which time the facility added clubhouses and another baseball field. At the end of September 1983, the Del E. Webb Construction Company sold the stadium to a construction and development company based in Glendale. The Brewers held spring training games in Sun City through 1985, after which they moved to Chandler. The final game the Brewers played in Sun City was on April 3, 1985, a 7–5 win over the Seattle Mariners.

After the Brewers left in 1985, the ballpark was closed and put up for sale. The women's softball team, the Sun City Saints, had disbanded after ownership raised their rent for use of the facility. In 1989, a Glendale-based three-person partnership bought the stadium to use for youth and adult amateur baseball leagues. The following year, the Sun City Saints reformed after ownership allowed them to use the stadium rent-free. Also in 1990, the stadium served as the home ballpark of the Sun City Rays of the short-lived Senior Professional Baseball Association. During this timeframe, the stadium became the property of a local bank, which was later absorbed by the federal Resolution Trust Corporation (RTC).

In May 1991, a different three-person partnership, incorporated as "Field of Dreams", leased the stadium from the RTC with an option to buy, primarily to host men's amateur baseball; the partnership changed the name of the facility to Sun Cities Stadium. In 1992 and 1993, the Mesa Solar Sox of the Arizona Fall League used the stadium as their home ballpark. In March 1993, a partnership known as Sun Cities Associates—two of the Field of Dreams partners plus an attorney from New York—bought the stadium for $500,000 from the RTC. Later that year, a closely-linked group, known as Sun Cities Stadium Associates, attempted to get the Kansas City Royals to move their spring training to a new stadium that would be built near the existing stadium. The effort, along with attempts to attract other major-league teams, proved to be unsuccessful. With no professional baseball tenant for the stadium, and a new baseball facility (Peoria Sports Complex opened in March 1994) located only 6 miles (9.7 km) away, ownership announced in June 1994 that the stadium would be torn down and replaced with a housing complex.
