= James Boswell (disambiguation) =

James Boswell (1740–1795) was a Scottish lawyer, diarist, and author

James Boswell may also refer to:

- James Boswell (1778–1822), or James Boswell the Younger, second son of James Boswell (1740–1795), barrister-at-law and editor
- James Griffin Boswell (1882–1952), American farmer in California
- James G. Boswell II (1923–2009), American farmer in California
- James Boswell (artist) (1906–1971), New Zealand-British painter and socialist
- Jimmy Boswell (1922–2010), English footballer
- Sir James Boswell, 2nd Baronet, of the Boswell baronets

== See also ==
- Boswell (surname)
