= R. H. Johnson =

American businessman (1916–2008)

Robert Howard Johnson
- Born: February 26, 1916; Phoenix, Arizona
- Died: July 22, 2008 (aged 92); Wickenburg, Arizona
- Occupations: President and CEO of Del Webb Corporation
- Years active: 1967–1981

Robert Howard Johnson (February 26, 1916 – July 22, 2008) was a chief executive officer of the Del Webb Corporation from 1974 to 1981. He also served in the board of the Del Webb Foundation from 1967 until 2007, serving as the board's president after retiring from Del Webb in 1981.

== Career ==
Johnson worked for the Association of General Contractors in a secretarial job while attending business school. In 1935, Del E. Webb came to the AGC offices in hopes of finding a timekeeper for his office. Johnson began his career with the Del E. Webb Construction Co. at $75 per month on a dormitory construction project for Northern Arizona University. Webb soon became Johnson’s friend and mentor as he worked his way up through the company. Johnson served as the Webb’s Los Angeles District Manager and in 1967 Webb chose Johnson to be the President of the company.

Prior to Webb's death in 1974 he named Johnson Chairman and CEO of the Del Webb Corporation at the age of 56. Johnson remained CEO for seven years, overseeing the initial construction of Sun City West, until he announced his retirement in 1981.

== Legacy ==
Johnson's legacy lives on throughout the community of Sun City West. The community's library, recreation center, and main boulevard are all named in honor of him and his contributions to the community.
