= Hiway House =

US motor hotel chain

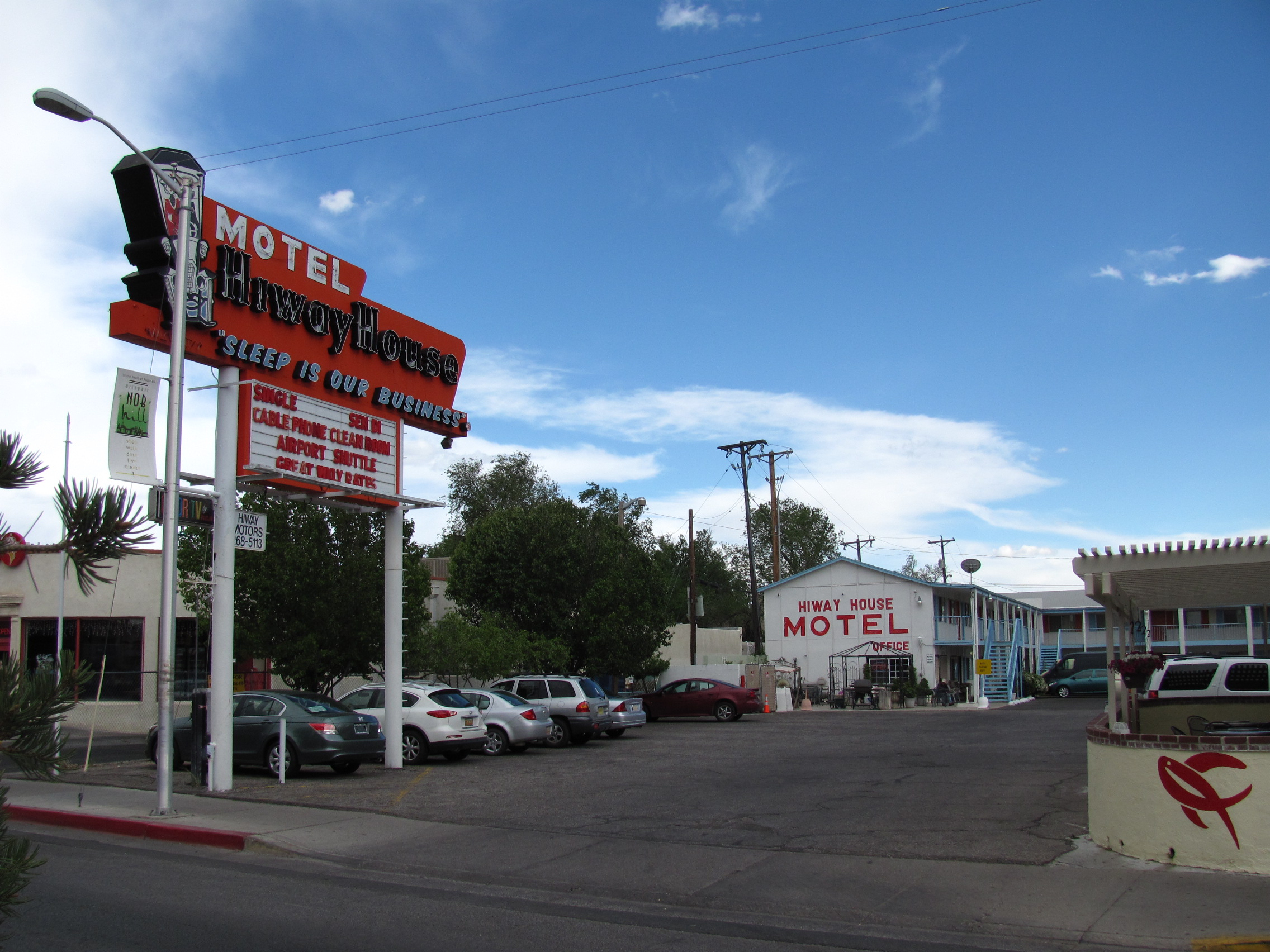
On Central Avenue in Albuquerque, New Mexico

Hiway House was a motor hotel chain founded in 1956 at Phoenix, Arizona, by the late Del Webb, a construction magnate who owned the New York Yankees baseball team and later created the Sun City retirement communities. A remnant of the old Hiway House chain was still in Albuquerque, New Mexico until it closed in 2018.

The chain soon became a fixture throughout the Southwest. Ultimately, there would be Del Webb's Hiway House locations at Phoenix, Holbrook, Flagstaff, and Tucson, Arizona; Albuquerque and Roswell, New Mexico; Tulsa, Oklahoma; Abilene, Texas; and Los Angeles near LAX, Blythe, Palm Springs, and Arcadia, California.

Before starting the Hiway House chain, Webb was one of the initial key investors of Ramada Inns from 1954 to 1956, then a new upstart chain of roadside hotels in the Southwestern states of Arizona, California and Texas with long-range plans for national coverage that was founded by Marion W. Isbell, a longtime Chicago restaurateur. Today, Ramada (now Ramada Franchise Systems) is one of the world's largest lodging chains and owned by Wyndham Hotels & Resorts.

Webb sold the Hiway House chain in the early 1960s, which then took the name Sentry Hiway House. The chain remained in operation until sometime after 1970, by which time most of the hotels were sold off and changed their names with some of them becoming franchises of competing lodging chains.

Albuquerque was one of the few cities to have two or more Hiway House locations during that chain's heyday. One of those locations is among the last Hiway House motor hotels still operating under that nameplate. Located in the 3200 block of Central Avenue S.E. in the Nob Hill section, which was the path of the world-famous U.S. Route 66 through Albuquerque, it still has the original colonial-style architecture and same neon sign that has stood since it opened in 1958. The bottom portion of the street-level Hiway House signs read the motto "Sleep is our Business." Today that line still appears on the sign of the Albuquerque location, which is owned by Bicu Corporation and has been operated in recent years by George and Livia Strimbu. The restaurant is no longer in operation and is currently for sale.

== See also ==
- List of motels
