= Marinette, Arizona =

Ghost town in Maricopa County, Arizona

- Ghost town
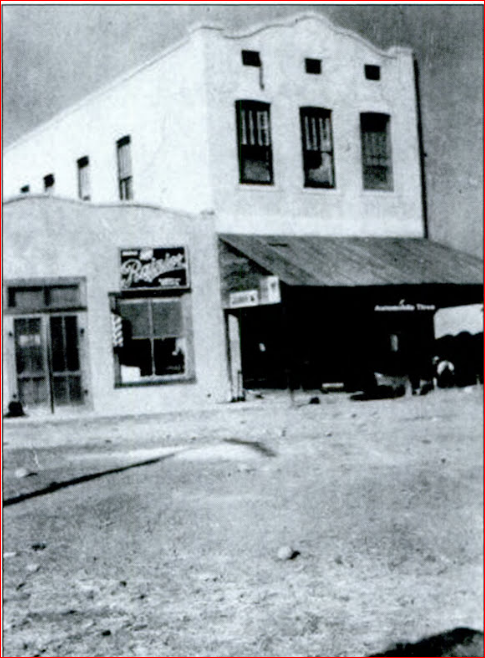
- Marinette General Store in 1920.

- Location within Arizona Location within the United States
- Coordinates: 33°35′51″N 112°16′19″W
- Country: United States
- State: Arizona
- County: Maricopa
- Elevation: 1,142 ft (348 m)
- Time zone: UTC-7 (MST (no DST))

Marinette was a ghost town in Maricopa County, Arizona, located just northwest of Peoria, Arizona, along the Atchison, Topeka and Santa Fe Railway. The site was promoted in the early 20th century for production of citrus fruit, apricots, olives, and other crops. The town was purchased by the Southwest Cotton company, a Goodyear subsidiary, in 1920. Throughout the late 40s and 50s the J. G. Boswell Company owned much of the land for its agricultural production. The town existed until 1957, when the post office serving Marinette was moved to Youngtown. The place where Marinette once was later became the site of Del Webb Corporation's Sun City, Arizona.

== History ==
In 1892, two men from Wisconsin, R.P. Davie and a business partner, chose to invest in 640 adjoining acres each. A section of railroad track on a corner of one of the sections, made the investment more advantageous. The two men negotiated to build a water stop on their land, naming it “Marinette” after their home town in Wisconsin. The town would grow over the next several years with the construction of homes, a general store, and eventually a post office in 1912.

The more than 1200 acres sat between the Agua Fría River and New River, making the land easily irrigated for crops. Davie developed a deep well pumping system in order to better irrigate his crops. In 1918, Davie began planting sugar beets. Sugar beets were a very popular commodity in the area around this time, as William J. Murphy, founder of Glendale, Arizona was also a commercial grower and had opened the Beet Sugar Factory in 1906. Davie invested heavily in his sugar beet crops, and soon learned that the soil could not produce a sweet enough beet, losing a great amount of his money.

In 1920, R.P. Davie sold his remaining land to the Southwest Cotton Company, a former subsidiary of Goodyear, used to expand their cotton growing operations from Goodyear and Litchfield Park. Southwest Cotton eventually sold their holdings to J.G. Boswell in 1936, allowing his company to continue to grow cotton, as well as lettuce. In 1957, the Marinette post office moved to Youngstown, Arizona, marking the beginning of the end for the small town.

Twenty-three years later, the Boswells would once again sell the land. In 1959, Del E. Webb purchased the Marinette Ranch in order to construct the beginnings of his new master planned retirement community and rename it Sun City.

== Legacy ==
Today, you can still find some traces and references to the old town.

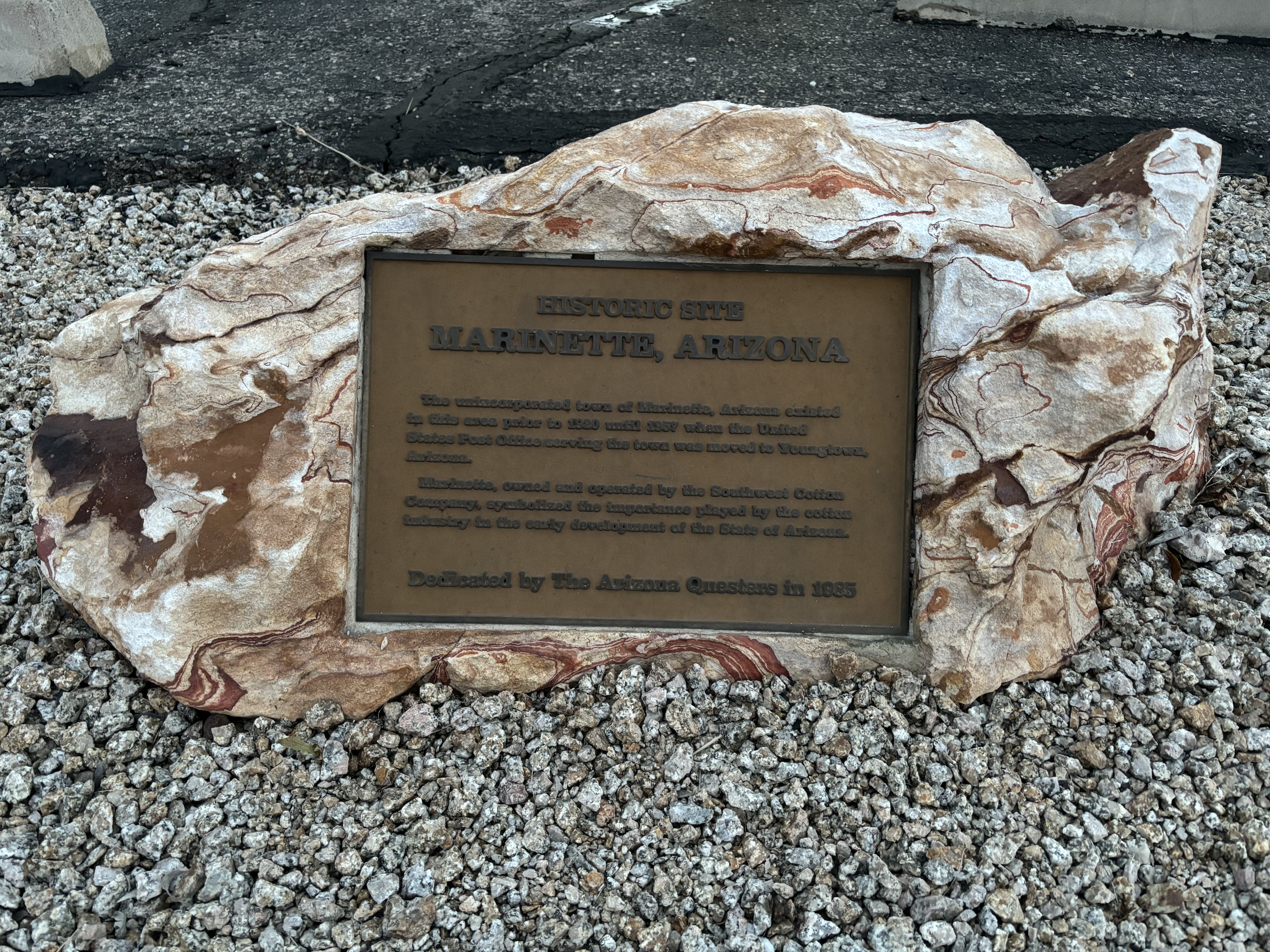

A historical marker can be found at the Del Webb Sun Cities Museum to remember and explain a brief history of the town.

The Marinette Recreation Center in Sun City, is also named after the former town.

The P.W. Litchfield Heritage Center briefly documents Southwest Cotton’s ownership and use of the Marinette Ranch with a map of the ranch with proposed crops.
