= Sun Bowl Amphitheatre =

Concert venue in Sun City, Arizona

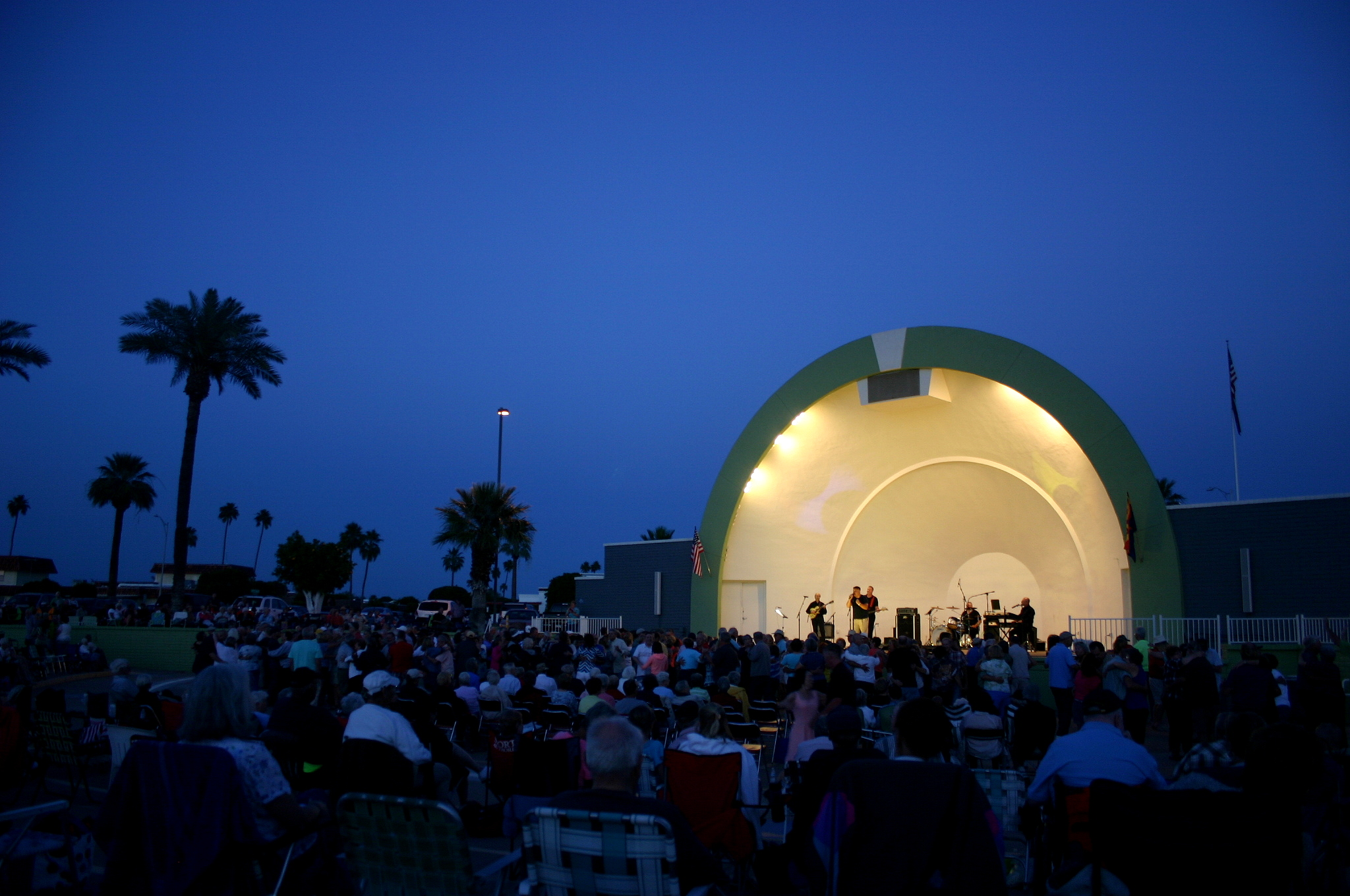
- Interactive map of Sun Bowl Amphitheatre
- Address: 10220 North 107th Avenue, Sun City, AZ 85351
- Coordinates: 33.577854°N 112.291002°W
- Owner: Recreation Centers of Sun City, Inc.
- Seating type: General admission floor
- Type: Amphitheatre

Construction
- Groundbreaking: 1965
- Built: 1966
- General contractor: Del E. Webb Construction Company

Website
- Web Site

The Sun Bowl Amphiteathtre is an outdoor amphitheatre in Sun City, Arizona owned by Recreation Centers of Sun City, Inc. It hosts numerous concerts, performances and other events geared towards the retirement communities of Sun City. The Sun Bowl complex comprises approximately 9.1 acres (37,000 m^{2}), including a regulation softball field and parking area.

== See also ==
- List of contemporary amphitheatres
