= Douglas Melamed =

American lawyer

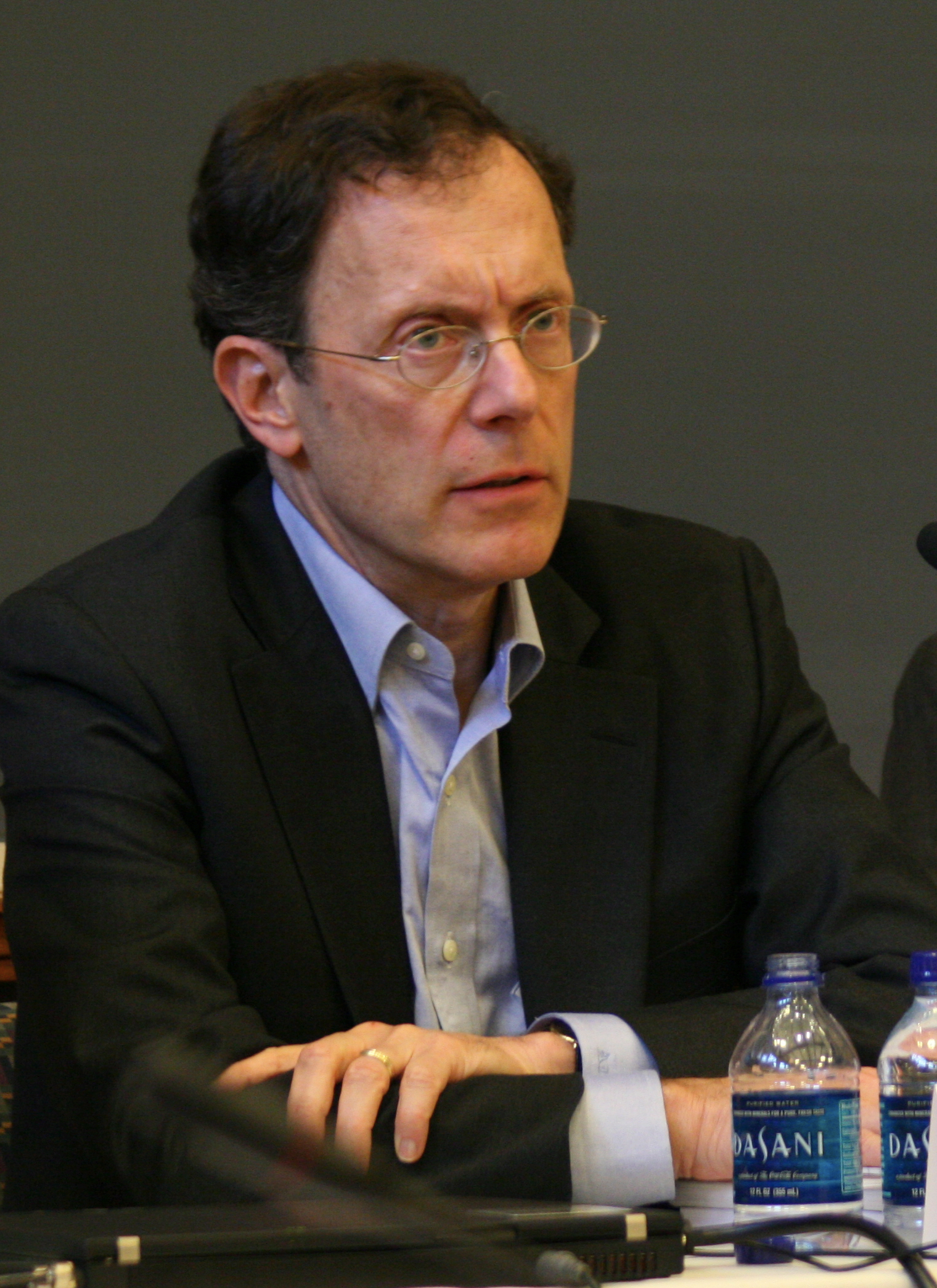
Doug Melamed at the Berkman Center for Internet & Society at Harvard University

Arthur Douglas Melamed (born December 3, 1945) is an American legal scholar specializing in antitrust law. Since 2014, Melamed has been a professor, first, visiting and then professor of the practice, at Stanford Law School. He was previously Senior Vice President and General Counsel at Intel Corporation as well as the chair of the Antitrust and Competition Practice Group at the law firm of WilmerHale.

== Early life and academics ==
Arthur Douglas Melamed was born on December 3, 1945, to Arthur C. Melamed and Helen Melamed in Minneapolis, Minnesota. Melamed graduated from Yale University with a Bachelor of Arts degree in 1967, then from Harvard Law School with a Juris Doctor degree in 1970, where he was an editor on the Harvard Law Review.

== Career ==
After law school, he clerked for one year with Judge Charles M. Merrill on the U.S. Court of Appeals for the Ninth Circuit. By co-authoring a law review article on the different types of property rights accorded by tort rules and property rules in Property Rules, Liability Rules and Inalienability: One View of the Cathedral with Guido Calabresi, he became well-known in the field of law and economics for his views on the natural evolution of property rights. He served in the Justice Department's antitrust division under Joel Klein and was later Acting Assistant Attorney General during the Clinton Administration. He then began working as the chair of the Antitrust and Competition Practice Group at the law firm of WilmerHale. From 2009 to 2014, Melamed was the Senior Vice President and General Counsel of Intel Corporation; there, he oversaw Intel’s legal, corporate affairs, and government affairs departments. In 2014, he became, and still is, a professor at Stanford Law School.

== Publicity ==
Throughout his career, Melamed has been interviewed by the media, mainly about antitrust law. In 2015, Corporate Counsel covered a story on Melamed titled '"The Michael Jordan" of Law now Focuses on Teaching'. From May 2019 to June 2019, in particular, Melamed was interviewed by a variety of news outlets, including CNBC, as some antirust academics, regulators, and members of the public became concerned by the threat to competition that large tech platforms may pose.
