= Sun City Rays =

- 1990; Sun City, Arizona

Minor league affiliations
- Class: Independent Winter League
- League: Senior Professional Baseball Association

Team data
- Ballpark: Sun City Stadium

The Sun City Rays were a short-lived professional baseball team, based in Sun City, Arizona. The Rays was a member of the Senior Professional Baseball Association in 1990 for the league's second season.

Jim Marshall managed the team, while Dave Hilton and Fred Stanley served as coaches. The Rays ceased operation when the circuit folded in December of that year. At the time the league folded, they had a 13–10 record and were second in the standings.

== Notable players ==
- Gary Allenson
- Barry Bonnell
- Ernie Camacho
- Bill Campbell
- Ron Davis
- Jim Dwyer
- Juan Eichelberger
- Pete Falcone
- Rollie Fingers
- Bob Galasso
- Dave Hilton
- Ferguson Jenkins
- Pete LaCock
- Rick Lancellotti
- Jack Lazorko
- Ricky Peters
- Lenny Randle
- Ronn Reynolds
- Tony Scott
- Razor Shines
- Guy Sularz
- Roy Thomas
- Joel Youngblood
- Mark Wagner
