= Guido Calabresi =

Italian-born American judge and legal scholar (born 1932)

Senior Judge of the United States Court of Appeals for the Second Circuit
- Incumbent
- Assumed office July 21, 2009

Judge of the United States Court of Appeals for the Second Circuit
- In office July 21, 1994 – July 21, 2009
- Appointed by: Bill Clinton
- Preceded by: Thomas Meskill
- Succeeded by: Christopher F. Droney

13th Dean of Yale Law School
- In office July 1, 1985 – July 21, 1994
- Preceded by: Harry H. Wellington
- Succeeded by: Anthony T. Kronman

Personal details
- Born: October 18, 1932 (age 94) Milan, Kingdom of Italy
- Relations: Steven Calabresi (nephew)
- Education: Yale University (BS, LLB); Magdalen College, Oxford (BA)

Guido Calabresi (born October 18, 1932) is an Italian-born American jurist who serves as a senior circuit judge of the United States Court of Appeals for the Second Circuit. He is a former Dean of Yale Law School, where he has been a professor since 1959. Calabresi is considered, along with Ronald Coase and Richard Posner, a founder of the field of law and economics.

== Early life and education ==
Calabresi was born in 1932 in Milan, Kingdom of Italy. His father, Massimo Calabresi (1903–1988), was a cardiologist, and his mother, Bianca Maria Finzi-Contini Calabresi (1902–1982), was a scholar of European literature. Calabresi's parents were active in the resistance against Italian fascism and eventually fled Italy, immigrating to the United States in 1939. The family settled in New Haven, Connecticut, and became naturalized American citizens in 1948. Guido's older brother Paul Calabresi (1930–2003) was a prominent medical and pharmacological researcher of cancer and oncology. Calabresi's mother descends from an Italian-Jewish family.

Calabresi graduated from Yale College in 1953 with a Bachelor of Science, summa cum laude, in economics. He was awarded a Rhodes Scholarship and spent two years at Magdalen College, Oxford, receiving a Bachelor of Arts degree with first-class honours in 1955 (later promoted per tradition to Master of Arts). He then attended Yale Law School, where he was a notes editor for the Yale Law Journal. He graduated in 1958 ranked first in his class with a Bachelor of Laws, magna cum laude.

Following graduation from law school, Calabresi served as a law clerk for United States Supreme Court Associate Justice Hugo Black from 1958 to 1959.

== Legal career ==
Calabresi had been offered a full professorship at the University of Chicago Law School in 1960. However, he joined the faculty of the Yale Law School upon completion of his Supreme Court clerkship, becoming the youngest ever full professor at Yale Law, and was Dean from 1985 to 1994. He now is Sterling Professor Emeritus of Law and Professorial Lecturer in Law at Yale.

Calabresi is a member of the Connecticut Bar Association and from 1971 to 1975 served as town selectman for Woodbridge, Connecticut.

Calabresi is, along with Ronald Coase, a founder of law and economics. His pioneering contributions to the field include the application of economic reasoning to tort law, and a legal interpretation of the Coase theorem. Under Calabresi's intellectual and administrative leadership, Yale Law School became a leading center for legal scholarship imbued with economics and other social sciences. Calabresi has been awarded more than forty honorary degrees from universities across the world. He is a member of the Royal Swedish Academy of Sciences.

Calabresi's former students include Supreme Court Justices Samuel Alito, Clarence Thomas and Sonia Sotomayor, former United States Attorney General Michael Mukasey, constitutional law scholar Akhil Reed Amar, feminist legal scholar and law professor at the Universities of Michigan and Chicago Catharine MacKinnon, former White House Counsel Gregory Craig, former Senator John Danforth, Harvard Law School professor Richard H. Fallon Jr., civil and human rights legal scholar Kenji Yoshino, torts scholar Kenneth Abraham, feminist international attorney Ann Olivarius, and torts scholar Catherine Sharkey. Calabresi, alone among Yale Law School faculty members, supported Thomas's nomination to the Supreme Court.

== Federal judicial service ==
On February 9, 1994, President Bill Clinton nominated Calabresi as a United States Circuit Judge of the United States Court of Appeals for the Second Circuit vacated by Judge Thomas Joseph Meskill. He was confirmed by the United States Senate on July 18, 1994. He received his commission on July 21, 1994 and entered duty on September 16, 1994. Calabresi assumed senior status on July 21, 2009.

== Awards and honors ==
In 1985, Guido was awarded the Laetare Medal by the University of Notre Dame, the oldest and most prestigious award for American Catholics.

In 1992, Princeton University awarded him an honorary Doctorate of Laws.

In 2006, Yale created the Guido Calabresi Professorship of Law, with Kenji Yoshino serving as the inaugural professor of the endowed chair. Daniel Markovits is the current holder of the chair.

Calabresi is an Honorary Editor of the University of Bologna Law Review, a general student-edited law journal published by the Department of Legal Studies of the University of Bologna.

Calabresi is the author of four books and over 100 articles on law and related subjects.

=== Honors ===
- Elected to the American Academy of Arts and Sciences, 1972
- Honorary degree, University of Pavia, 1987
- Elected to the American Philosophical Society, 1997
- Honoris causa degree in law, University of Brescia, 21 January 2013
- Robert B. McKay Law Professor Award, American Bar Association Tort Trial and Insurance Practice Section, 2015

== Major works ==
- 1961, "Some Thoughts on Risk Distribution and the Law of Torts," Yale Law Journal.
- 1970. The Costs of Accidents: A Legal and Economic Analysis. Yale University Press.
- 1972 (with Douglas Melamed), "Property Rules, Liability Rules and Inalienability: One View of the Cathedral," Harvard Law Review. (Very often cited.)
- 1982 "A Common Law For The Age of Statutes," (Harvard University Press).
- 1978 (with Philip Bobbit)"Tragic Choices. The conflicts society confronts in the allocation of tragically scarce resources." (WW Norton and Company New York, NY)
- 2016 "The Future of Law & Economics: Essays in Reform and Recollection" Tragic Choices. The conflicts society confronts in the allocation of tragically scarce resources." Yale University Press.

== Notable decisions ==
- Leibovitz v. Paramount Pictures Corp., 137 F.3d 109 (2nd Cir. 1998).
- Arar v. Ashcroft (2nd Cir. 2009), dissenting.
- United States v. Calvin Weaver, 18-1697 (2nd Cir. 2021). In a case regarding an unwarranted police search of a Black man walking by, Calabresi was one of three dissenters who argued that the search violated the 4th amendment. The other two dissenters were Rosemary Pooler and Denny Chin. Calabresi explained that "The majority begins its opinion by saying that this is an ordinary case of an ordinary police search. That, unfortunately, is all too true. But though ordinary, and very common, the facts of this case, and the fact that a strong majority made up of thoughtful judges comes out as it does, demonstrates beyond peradventure why this area of the law is so disastrous."
- Mujo v. Jani-King International, Inc., 20-111 (2nd Cir. 2021). Calabresi dissented from a ruling that permitted a corporation to require employees to sign a contract giving the corporation power to take part of their salary despite Connecticut's minimum wage laws.

== Personal life ==
Calabresi married Anne Gordon Audubon Tyler, a social anthropologist, freelance writer, social activist, philanthropist and arts patron. Both received their primary education at the Foote School in New Haven, graduating in 1946 and 1948, respectively. Calabresi would continue on to receive his secondary education from Hopkins School, graduating in 1949.

They reside in Woodbridge, Connecticut, and have three children. Anne Gordon Audubon Calabresi (Anne Calabresi Oldshue), a psychiatrist, graduated cum laude from Yale, attended medical school at Case Western Reserve University and completed residency at Harvard. Massimo Franklin Tyler Calabresi, a journalist with Time magazine, also graduated from Yale. Bianca Finzi-Contini Calabresi attended Yale as well, graduating summa cum laude, and has a Ph.D. in Renaissance literature from Columbia. Calabresi's nephew, Steven G. Calabresi, is a Constitutional Law professor at Northwestern University and a co-founder of the Federalist Society.

== See also ==
- List of Jewish American jurists
- List of law clerks for the first seat of the Supreme Court of the United States

Academic offices
Preceded by Harry Hillel Wellington	Dean of Yale Law School; 1985–1994	Succeeded by Anthony T. Kronman
Legal offices
Preceded by Thomas Joseph Meskill	Judge of the United States Court of Appeals for the Second Circuit; 1994–2009	Succeeded by Christopher F. Droney
