= Sun City West, Arizona =

City in Arizona, United States

- Census-designated place
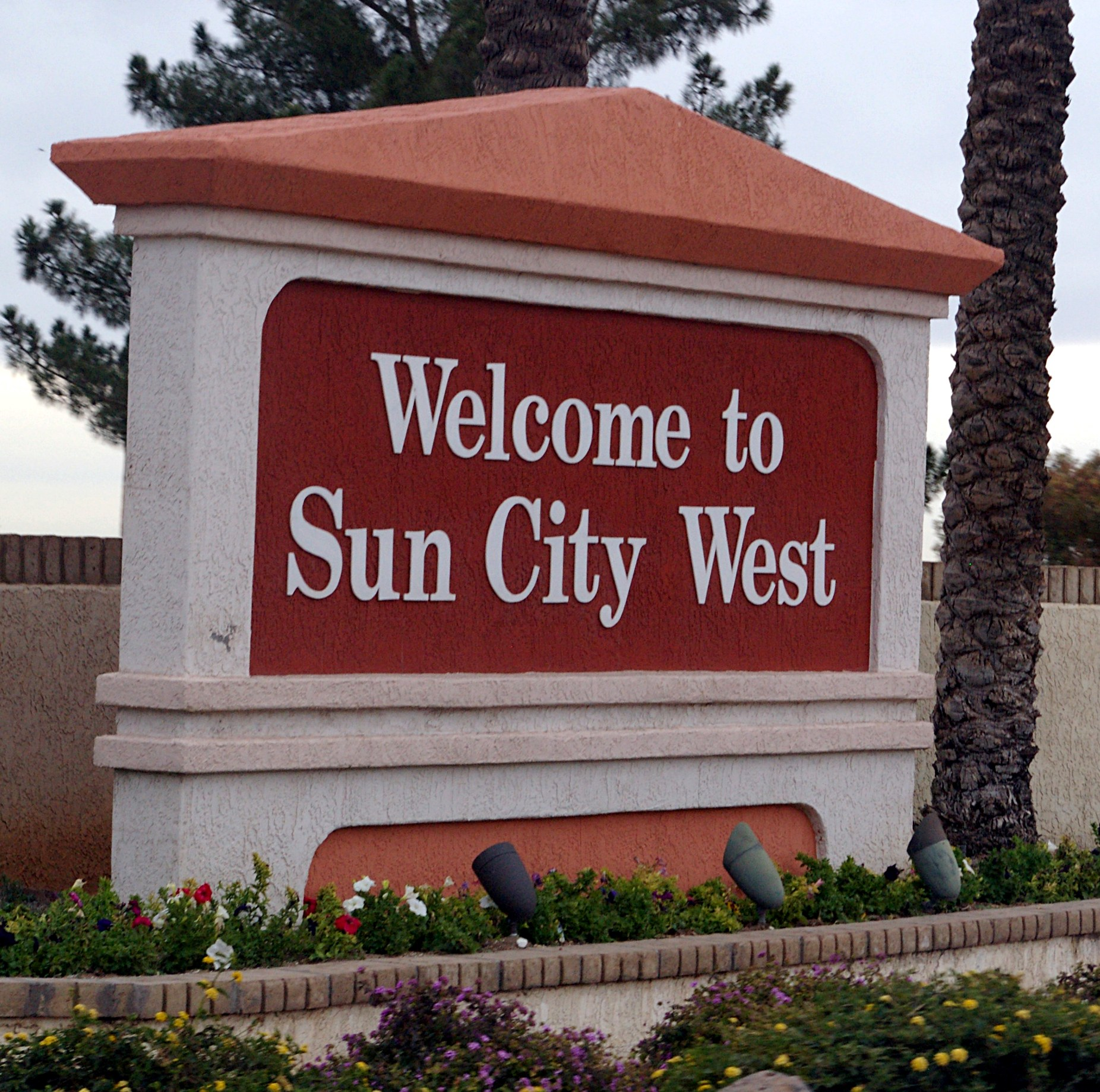
- Sun City West entrance sign

- Flag

- Location in Maricopa County, Arizona

- Location within Arizona Location within the United States
- Coordinates: 33°40′32″N 112°22′28″W
- Country: United States
- State: Arizona
- County: Maricopa

Area
  - Total: 11.97 sq mi (30.99 km^{2})
  - Land: 11.93 sq mi (30.89 km^{2})
  - Water: 0.039 sq mi (0.10 km^{2})
- Elevation: 1,253 ft (382 m)

Population (2020)
  - Total: 25,806
  - Density: 2,163.8/sq mi (835.44/km^{2})
- Time zone: UTC-7 (MST)
  - Summer (DST): UTC-7 (no DST)
- ZIP Code: 85375
- Area code: 623
- FIPS code: 04-70355
- GNIS feature ID: 2410024

Sun City West is an unincorporated community and census-designated place (CDP) in Maricopa County, Arizona, United States. The population was 25,806 at the 2020 census.

== Geography ==
Sun City West is located 23 miles (37 km) northwest of downtown Phoenix. It is bordered to the south, west, and north by the city of Surprise. U.S. Route 60 runs along the southwest border of the community, and the Arizona State Route 303 freeway bounds the community to the north and northwest.

According to the United States Census Bureau, the CDP has a total area of 12.0 square miles (31 km^{2}), of which 0.04 square miles (0.10 km^{2}), or 0.33%, are water.

== Demographics ==
Historical population
Census	Pop.	Note	%±
1980	3,772		—
1990	15,997		324.1%
2000	26,344		64.7%
2010	24,535		−6.9%
2020	25,806		5.2%

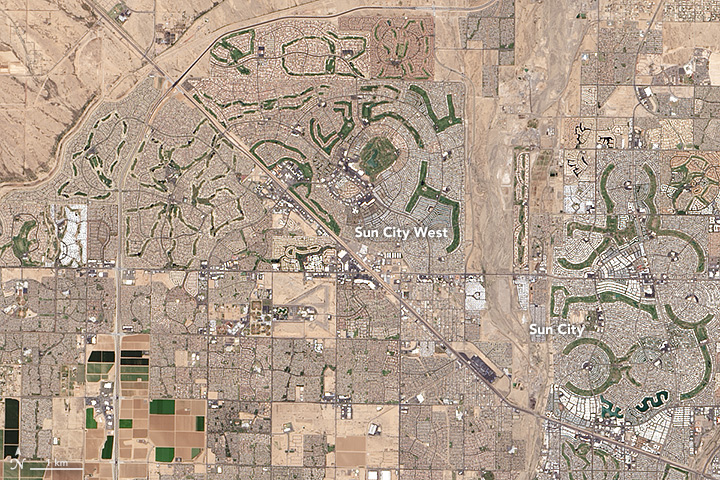
Sun City West and Sun City from Landsat 8, 2016

=== 2020 census ===
As of the 2020 census, Sun City West had a population of 25,806. The median age was 74.4 years. 0.4% of residents were under the age of 18 and 83.9% of residents were 65 years of age or older. For every 100 females there were 79.8 males, and for every 100 females age 18 and over there were 79.7 males age 18 and over.

100.0% of residents lived in urban areas, while 0.0% lived in rural areas.

There were 15,506 households in Sun City West, of which 0.7% had children under the age of 18 living in them. Of all households, 51.8% were married-couple households, 13.2% were households with a male householder and no spouse or partner present, and 31.6% were households with a female householder and no spouse or partner present. About 39.6% of all households were made up of individuals and 35.2% had someone living alone who was 65 years of age or older.

There were 18,332 housing units, of which 15.4% were vacant. The homeowner vacancy rate was 1.6% and the rental vacancy rate was 16.3%.

Racial composition as of the 2020 census
Race	Number	Percent
White	24,498	94.9%
Black or African American	231	0.9%
American Indian and Alaska Native	65	0.3%
Asian	212	0.8%
Native Hawaiian and Other Pacific Islander	9	0.0%
Some other race	179	0.7%
Two or more races	612	2.4%
Hispanic or Latino (of any race)	553	2.1%

=== 2010 census ===
At the 2010 census there were 24,535 people, 14,873 households, and 8,550 families in the CDP. The population density was 2,245.2 inhabitants per square mile (866.9/km^{2}). There were 18,218 housing units at an average density of 1,666.8 per square mile (643.6/km^{2}). The racial makeup of the CDP was 97.8% White, 0.8% Black or African American, 0.2% Native American, 0.6% Asian, 0.1% Pacific Islander, 0.2% from other races, and 0.5% from two or more races. 1.2% of the population were Hispanic or Latino of any race. Of the 14,873 households, 14 had children under the age of 18 living with them, 54.5% were married couples living together, 2.3% had a female householder with no husband present, and 42.5% were non-families. 39.3% of households were one person and 35.4% were one person aged 65 or older. The average household size was 1.64 and the average family size was 2.05.

The age distribution was 0.1% under the age of 14, 0.1% from 15 to 19, 0.1% from 15 to 24, 0.2% from 25 to 29, 0.2% from 30 to 34, 0.2% 35 to 39, 0.4% 45 to 49, 1.5% from 50 to 54, 3.6% 55 to 59, 9.2% from 60 to 64, 13.8% from 65 to 69, 17.2% from 70 to 74, 19.5% from 75 to 79, 18.3% from 80 to 84, and 14.8% who were 85 years of age or older. The median age was 75.6 years. For every 100 females age 18 and over, there were 77.6 males.

The median household income was $44,614 and the median family income was $58,345. Males had a median income of $48,333 versus $33,125 for females. The per capita income for the CDP was $35,502. About 2.5% of families and 5.4% of the population were below the poverty line, including none of those under age 18 and 5.0% of those age 65 or over.

== History ==
Sun City West was constructed on an 11,000-acre (4,500 ha) site to the west of Sun City, including part of the former Lizard Acres cattle ranch. The community was constructed by the Del E. Webb Construction Company, overseen by R.H. Johnson. Sun City West was completely built out in 1997, and a sister city, Sun City Grand, to the southwest of Grand Avenue was started.

Due to the COVID-19 pandemic, the city announced on March 11, 2020 the closures of all recreation centers. This later led to the closures of all seven golf courses on April 13, 2020. All facilities were reopened on March 15, 2021.

== Government ==
As an unincorporated area, Sun City West does not have a city government. Instead, Sun City West is "governed" by Property Owners and Residents Association (PORA), a community association that advocates for the Sun City West community.

Municipal services are provided by a variety of public and private organizations. Police services are provided by the Maricopa County Sheriff's Office. Street maintenance services are paid for by the taxpayers of the entire county. Fire service is provided by Arizona Fire and Medical Authority. Parks and recreation services are controlled by Recreation Centers of Sun City West, another community organization.

== Infrastructure ==
Electric service is provided by Arizona Public Service. Natural gas is provided by Southwest Gas. Water and sewer utilities are provided by a private utility, Epcor Water. Sanitation service is by a private hauler.

== Education ==
Most of Sun City West is not in any school district. Pieces are in the Dysart Unified School District and Peoria Unified School District.

== See also ==
- List of census-designated places in Arizona
