= James G. Boswell Foundation =

American foundation

The James G. Boswell Foundation is the charitable foundation established in 1947 by James Griffin Boswell (May 13, 1882 – 1952), founder of the J. G. Boswell Company, a successful farm and agricultural supplies enterprise established in Corcoran, California in 1921. The Foundation supports agricultural, general education, health concerns, pre-college private schools, public broadcasting, rural affairs groups and youth organizations. The Foundation has also provided support for the Institute for Agricultural Genomics at the University of California, Riverside.

Until his death in 2009, the Foundation was headed by J. G. Boswell, II, nephew of the company founder. J.W. Boswell, son of J.G. Boswell, II, now heads company operations, centered in California's Central Valley. A primary asset of the Boswell Foundation is its shareholding in the Boswell Corporation. Measured by farmed acreage, Boswell Corporation is the largest farming operation in California and one of the largest worldwide. Shares of the Boswell Corporation are traded on the "pink sheets," but very little information on this business is publicly available, even for non-management shareholders.
