= Kenneth Abraham =

American lawyer

Kenneth S. Abraham
- Born: June 1946 (age 79–80)
- Education: Indiana University (AB); Yale Law School (JD)
- Employer: University of Virginia School of Law
- Known for: Torts, insurance law
- Title: David and Mary Harrison Distinguished Professor of Law

Kenneth S. Abraham (born 1946) is the Harrison Distinguished Professor of Law at the University of Virginia School of Law.

== Biography ==
In 1967, Abraham graduated with a bachelor's degree from Indiana University, magna cum laude, where he was elected to Phi Beta Kappa. Abraham then attended Yale Law School, where he studied under famed torts scholar and future judge of the United States Court of Appeals for the Second Circuit Guido Calabresi, graduating with a J.D. in 1971.

After law school, Abraham worked in private practice in Hackensack, New Jersey, before teaching law at Case Western Reserve University School of Law and then at University of Maryland School of Law. He began teaching full-time at UVA Law in 1984. Abraham specializes in the law of torts and insurance, including emerging fields of torts and insurance such as the liability of self-driving cars.

Abraham is a life member of the American Law Institute, where he has served as an adviser on the Restatement of the Law of Liability Insurance and several iterations of the Restatement (Third) of Torts.

== Selected publications ==
- Abraham, Kenneth S. (2017). The forms and functions of tort law (5th ed.). St. Paul, Minnesota: Foundation Press. ISBN 978-1-6345-9451-6.
- Abraham, Kenneth S.; Schwartz, Daniel (2015). Insurance law & regulation: cases and materials (6th ed.). St. Paul, Minnesota: Foundation Press. ISBN 978-1-6093-0401-0.
- Abraham, Kenneth S. (2013). "Four Conceptions of Insurance". University of Pennsylvania Law Review. 161 (3): 653–698. JSTOR 23527819.
- Abraham, Kenneth S. (2013). "Self-Proving Causation". Virginia Law Review. 99 (8): 1811–1853. JSTOR 23611098.
- Abraham, Kenneth S. (2001). "The Trouble with Negligence". Vanderbilt Law Review. 54: 1187.
