= Ramada International =

From top to bottom: Original Ramada Inn logo, Ramada Worldwide (Cendant) logo, current 2005 logo, and Ramada International logo.

Ramada International is the company that owns, operates, and franchises hotels using the Ramada brand name outside of the United States and Canada. Ramada International was formerly owned by Marriott International, a competitor of Cendant, which owned Ramada in the United States and Canada. In 2004, however, Cendant purchased Ramada International from Marriott, which gives Cendant worldwide rights to the Ramada name. Despite now being under the same ownership, Ramada and Ramada International remained separate entities. In 2006, the hotels and hospitality divisions of Cendant were spun off into Wyndham Worldwide.

In 2023, Ramada International brought several parties to court over trademark infringement of the Ramada name in Delhi. In 2025 the company received a permanent injunction against an entity, "ClubRamada" for using the Ramada name.
