= The Costs of Accidents =

Book by Guido Calabresi

The Costs of Accidents: A Legal and Economic Analysis
- Author: Guido Calabresi
- Language: English
- Subject: Law and economics
- Publisher: Yale University Press
- Publication date: 1970
- Publication place: United States
- Media type: Paperback/Hardcover
- Pages: x, 340 p
- ISBN: 0-300-01114-8
- OCLC: 59166

The Costs of Accidents: A Legal and Economic Analysis by Guido Calabresi is a work in the law and economics tradition because it provides an economic efficiency analysis of the rules of tort law. The text was initially published in 1970 by Yale University Press.

== Overview ==
The central aim of tort law is not the absolute minimization of losses from individual accidents because the total accident cost of any economically fruitful activity/industry includes both the expected cost of the accidents that happen to occur and the actual costs expended in avoiding the accidents.

For expenditures to prevent accidents, there must be associated levels of expected accidents and expected losses. Unfortunately, there is a serious underregistration of the most common accidents that have only a small cost per accident but may be important in the total cost of accidents. Only few studies have accurately quantified the entire cost of accidents. The whole cost at a given level of precaution is the net of the precautionary expenditures in addition to the losses accrued from the accidents that were not prevented. If the goal is to minimize the total costs of accidents, the costs of precaution should be included.
