= Lizard Acres, Arizona =

- Cattle ranch, train stop
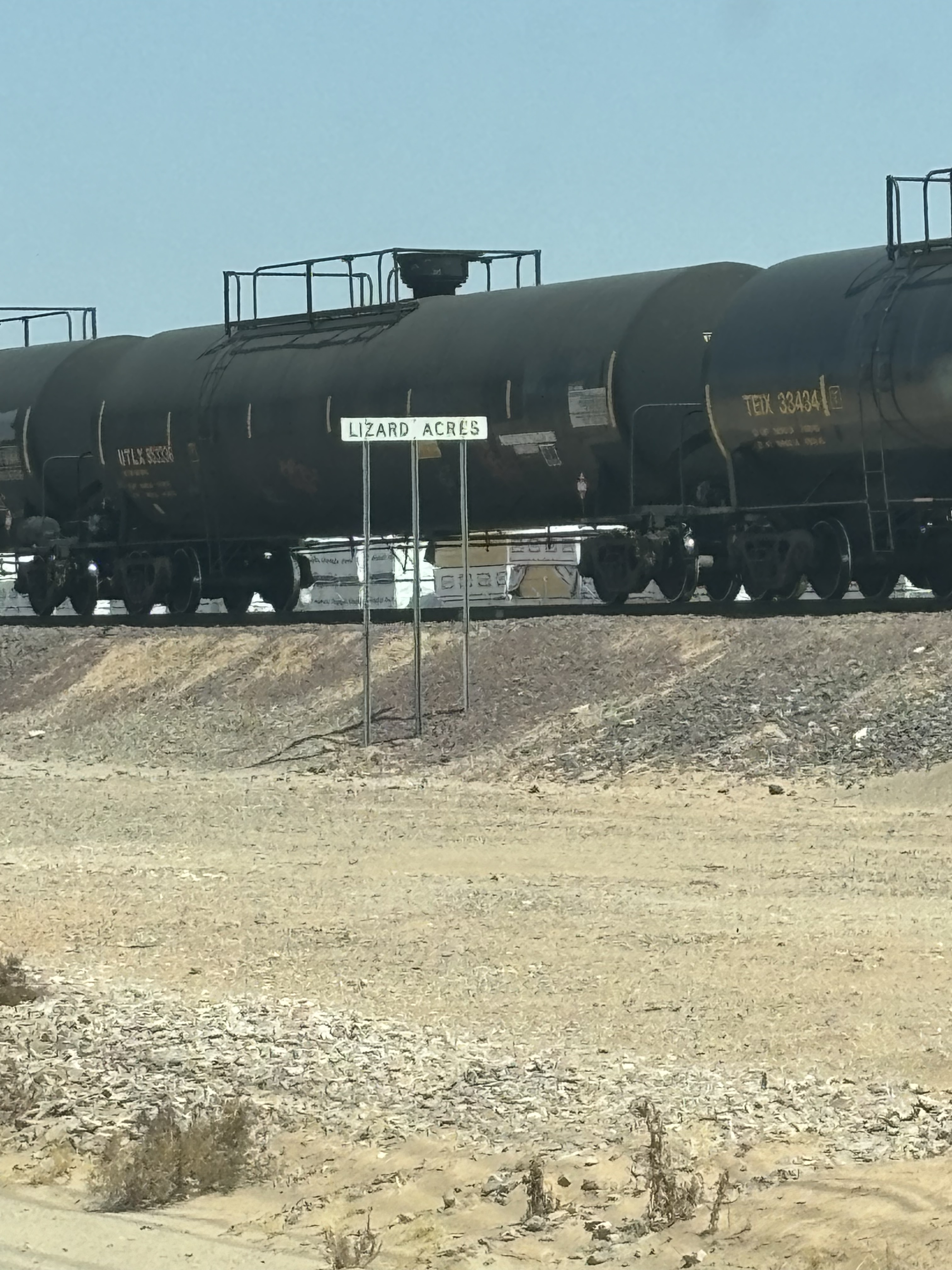
- Lizard Acres sign in Surprise, Arizona

- Location within Arizona Location within the United States
- Coordinates: 33°38′07″N 112°20′43″W
- Country: United States
- State: Arizona
- County: Maricopa

Area
  - Total: 3 sq mi (7.8 km^{2})
- Elevation: 1,191 ft (363 m)
- Time zone: UTC-7 (Mountain (MST))
  - Summer (DST): UTC-7 (MST)
- ZIP codes: 85375
- Area codes: 480, 602, 623
- FIPS code: 04-41645
- GNIS feature ID: 24498

Lizard Acres was a former cattle ranch, subdivision, and train stop situated in Maricopa County, Arizona, near the present day town of Surprise. It has an estimated elevation of 1,191 feet (363 m) above sea level.

Lizard Acres (noted as Lizard on topographic maps) was a train stop just north of Surprise, Arizona. The stop is near current day Grand Avenue and Bell Road in Surprise, Arizona. The site also held a cattle farm.

== History ==
In the 1940s, ranchers from Holbrook, Arizona, R. S. Spurlock and J. C. Wetzler were looking for land for a proposed 1,900 acre site for a new ranch. Their search led them to land one mile east of where the intersection of Grand Avenue and Bell Road is today. Spurlock is rumored to have declared "Jumpin' Jehosophat, this country isn't fit for raising anything but lizards!" As a result, the ranch was nicknamed "Lizard Acres,” but officially was called Circle One Livestock Company.

In the early 1960s, the ranch held 13,000 cattle. The Circle One Livestock Company ranch was one of the leading cattle operations in the southwest. In Surprise’s early years, the ranch loaned equipment and workers to assist in the town’s creation and maintenance of its roads. Throughout the 1960s and into the early 1970s, the ranch began selling parts of its land to Del E. Webb to build Sun City West, Arizona, a retirement community.

== Legacy ==
Although the ranch known as “Lizard Acres” is gone, a sign bearing the name remains along the BNSF (former Santa Fe) railroad tracks that run adjacent to Grand Avenue, 1/2 mile north of Bell Road.

A pub in Sun City West also bears the name, paying homage to the cattle ranch that stood on the land it now calls home.

An art installation in Scottsdale, Arizona is named after the former ranch as well. Designed by artist Joe Tyler, who remembers the ranch from his childhood, it features many steel animals and plants.
