= Ramada =

Large hotel chain run by Wyndham Hotels & Resorts

Ramada Worldwide Inc.
- Trade name: Ramada
- Industry: Hospitality
- Founded: 1953; 73 years ago
- Founder: Marion W. Isbell; Michael Robinson
- Headquarters: Parsippany, New Jersey, United States
- Number of locations: 851 (December 31, 2022)
- Area served: Worldwide
- Parent: Wyndham Hotels and Resorts
- Website: wyndhamhotels.com/ramada

Ramada is a large American multinational hotel chain owned by Wyndham Hotels & Resorts. As of December 31, 2022, it operated 851 hotels with 120,344 rooms across 63 countries under the Ramada brand.

== Name ==
The Ramada name derives from the Spanish term rama (meaning "branch"). Temporary open-air structures called "ramadas" (meaning "porch" or "arbor"), made of brush or branches (similar to an arbor) were popular in Arizona during harvest time. Company websites commonly refer to the structure as a "shady resting place".

== History ==
The friendly and balding Uncle Ben, on a Ramada Inn swizzle stick. In the early days, Ramada had branded on-site restaurants and lounges.

=== Foundation and early years ===
Longtime Chicago restaurateur Marion W. Isbell (1905–1988) founded the chain in 1953 along with a group of investors including Michael Robinson of McAllen, Texas (who later went on to start Rodeway Inns in the early 1960s) and Del Webb of Phoenix (who owned the New York Yankees and went on to establish his own lodging chain, Hiway House, in 1956). Other original investors of Ramada Inns included Isbell's brother-in-law Bill Helsing; Max Sherman, a produce operator from Chicago dubbed "The Tomato King"; Chicago attorneys Ezra Ressman and Mort Levin; and Frank Lichtenstein and Robert Rosow of San Antonio, Texas.

Early in 1952, Marion W. Isbell received a phone call from his brother-in-law, Bill Helsing. Bill informed him of a hotel deal in Flagstaff, AZ that he was going to invest in and wanted to know if Marion would be interested in joining him. This first investment resulted in a rapid return on capital.

Ramada opened its first hotel, a 60-room facility, on U.S. Route 66 at Flagstaff, Arizona in 1954 and set up its headquarters in Phoenix, Arizona, where the chain built the Sahara Hotel on North 1st Street downtown in 1956 (which later became the Ramada Inn Downtown) and a 300-room Ramada Inn in the 3800 block of East Van Buren in 1958 that would become the chain's flagship property and headquarters. Like his contemporary, Holiday Inn hotel-chain founder Kemmons Wilson, Isbell devised the idea of building and operating a chain of roadside motor hotels when, while on a cross-country trip with his wife Ingrid and their three children, he noted the substandard quality of roadside motor courts along US highways at the time. He had the idea to develop a chain of roadside motor hotels conveniently located along major highways which would provide lodgings with hotel-like quality at near-motel rates plus amenities such as TV, air conditioning, swimming pools, and on-premises restaurants.

From its start in the 1950s until around 1976, Ramada's logo featured a friendly bald innkeeper, dubbed "Uncle Ben" (unrelated to Uncle Ben). He sported an apron (later a suit and tie) and held a top hat in one hand; in the other hand was a red trumpeted banner that read "Ramada Inn Roadside Hotels". From 1976 to 1982, the chain's logo was a simple rounded rectangle that read "Ramada Inn" in the original design's gothic Western-style lettering. From 1982 to 2004, Ramada changed to a revised, rounded rectangular design with more "modern" lettering.

At one point the chain was owned by Ramada Inns, Inc., a holding company set up by Isbell to oversee Ramada's various divisions including hotel operations, franchising, real estate, and equipment purchasing. Under Isbell's leadership, Ramada grew into one of the nation's largest lodging chains during the 1960s and 1970s with 100 Ramada Inns in operation by 1964, which grew to 250 in 1970 and nearly 650 by 1976. By the late 1970s, Ramada ranked as the second-largest hotel chain in the U.S. behind industry leader Holiday Inn. Also during the 1970s, Ramada expanded into worldwide operation by opening new hotels in various European nations and on other continents.

=== Ramada in the 1970s–1990s ===
Marion W. Isbell served as president and CEO of Ramada until 1970 when he resigned from the presidency and turned it over to his son, William M. Isbell. The senior Isbell continued as the chain's CEO until his retirement in 1972, then Chairman of the Board until 1979. William M. Isbell would serve as Ramada's president and CEO until 1981.

Ramada developed a chain of in-hotel restaurants similar to the Howard Johnson's restaurants, operating them under various names including Uncle Ben's Kitchen, Ramada Pancake Cottage, and Chez Bon, as well as other names used by individual franchises. The company-owned Ramada restaurants became defunct in 1990, though the franchised hotels still include on-premises restaurants.

In an attempt to revive the company's lagging business in 1989, Ramada Inns, Inc. decided to split its hotel/restaurant businesses and its gaming businesses. The Ramada hotels and restaurants were sold for $540 million to New World Development Company and the gaming business which included the Tropicana Las Vegas, Tropicana Atlantic City, and Ramada Express in Laughlin, Nevada, were spun off to a new company called Aztar Corporation. In the original deal for the gaming business, Ramada shareholders were to get $7 in cash per share plus half a share of the new Aztar Corporation. However, this changed quickly to a new deal where shareholders would receive $1 per share plus one share of Aztar Corporation. In the late 1990s, Ramada was sold to Cendant Corporation of New York City.

=== Development since 2000 ===
Under Cendant's ownership, Ramada franchises Ramada Inn, Ramada Limited, Ramada Plaza, and Ramada Suites in the United States and Canada. Ramada itself no longer directly or indirectly owns or operates any of the Ramada hotels. Outside of the U.S. and Canada, Ramada hotels are owned and operated or franchised by Ramada International, which was owned by Marriott International. However, in 2004, Ramada International was purchased by Cendant, giving Cendant the worldwide rights to the Ramada brand. Ramada International remains separate from the Ramada operations in the United States and Canada. In 2006, Cendant spun off its hotel operations, including Ramada, to Wyndham Worldwide.

== Brands ==
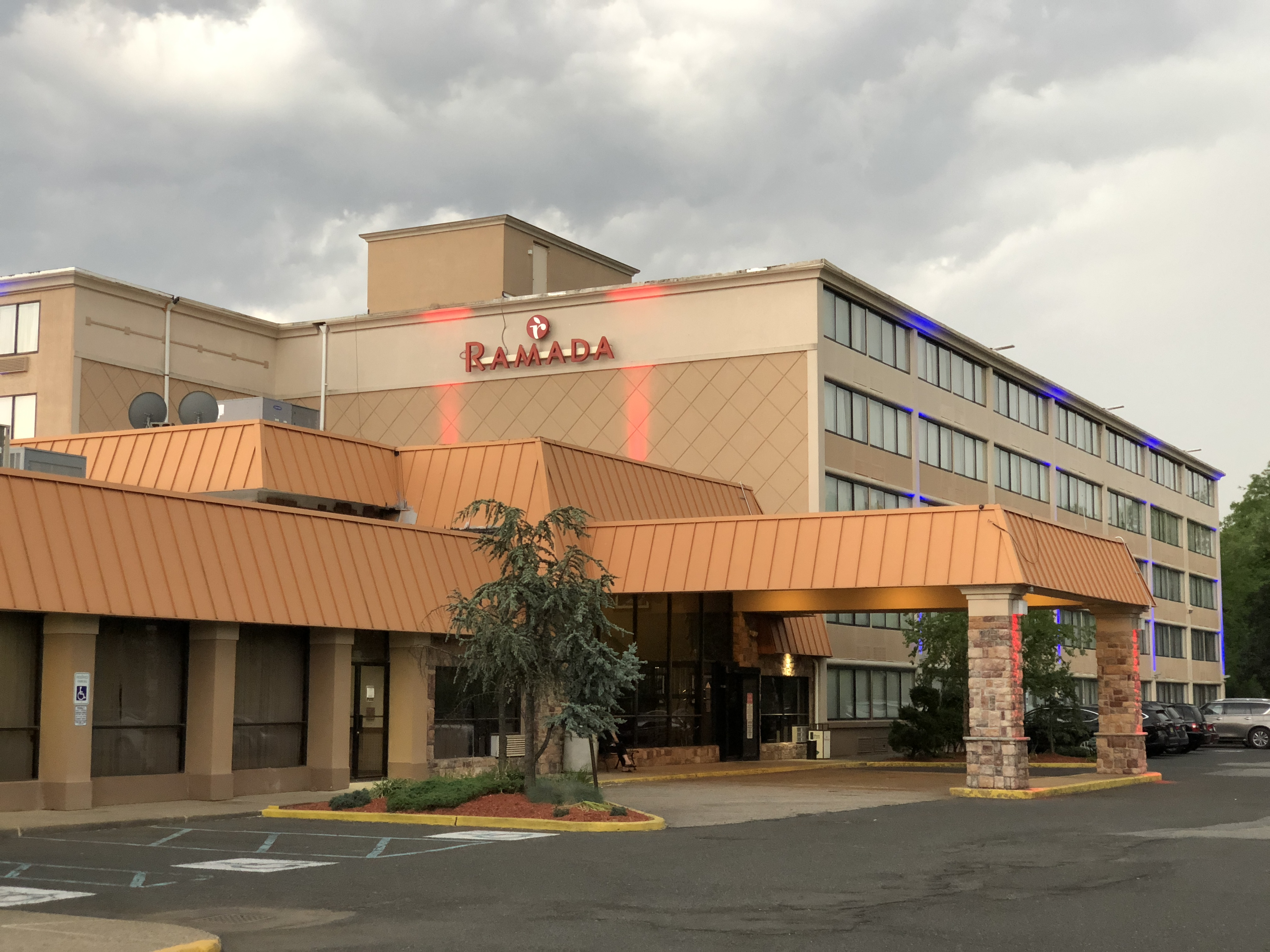
Ramada in Rochelle Park

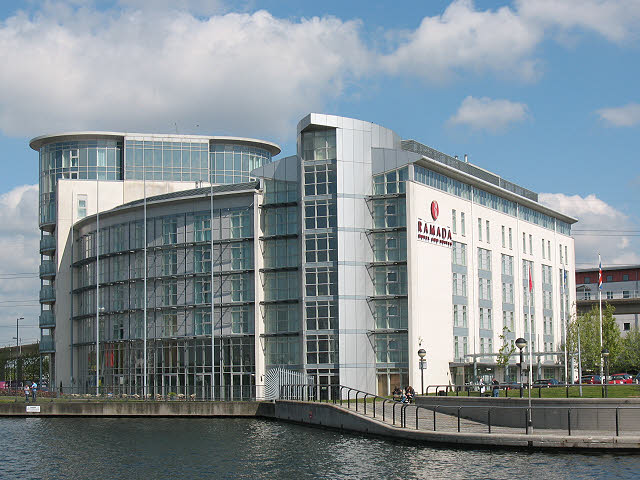
Ramada in London

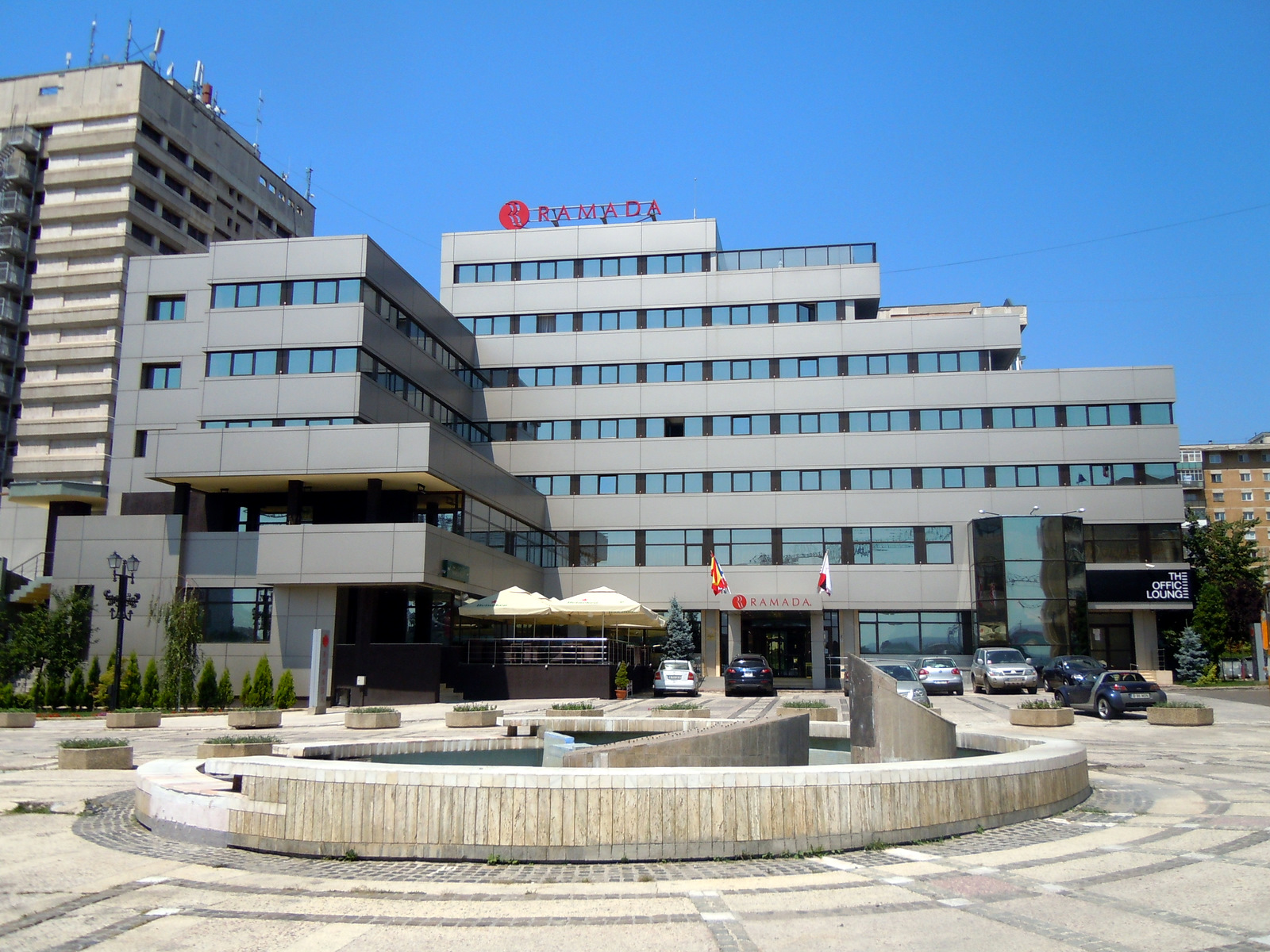
Ramada in Iaşi

=== Current brands ===
The chain offers different hotel brands or "tiers" based on price and services offered.

- Ramada Limited — budget-oriented properties, typically with no on-site restaurant, though a pool and deluxe continental breakfast are standard. Some Ramada Limiteds consist of rooms mixed with suites or entire suites.
- Ramada Inn, Inn & Suites, Suites — full-service properties with swimming pools, exercise rooms, room service, and free breakfast items. If there is no restaurant on site, a convenience store is usually on the premises. Some hotels have mixed rooms and suites, and a few are entirely suites.
- Ramada Hotel, Hotel & Suites, Hotel & Resort — found only outside the US, these are full-service hotels with room service, a full-service restaurant, and fully developed fitness centers. Many of the international hotels also offer suites in addition to rooms, and a few have a resort and hotel together.
- Ramada Plaza — lower "upscale" properties offering business centers, full restaurants, enhanced room service, and concierges at many locations.
- Ramada Resorts — found in locations outside the US; located in tourist destinations and high-traffic locations.

=== Former brands ===
- One of the "tiers" is no longer part of Ramada: Ramada Renaissance, a division of upscale businesses and resort hotels begun in 1982. When Ramada was sold in 1989, the new owners divided the brand into its own chain, named Renaissance Hotels, and then sold it to Marriott International in 1997.

== Properties ==
=== United Kingdom ===
In the United Kingdom, Jarvis Hotels Limited were the largest franchisee of the Ramada brand. They operated corporately as Ramada Jarvis. Six of the properties were bannered as Country Collection hotels; they are properties that were historic buildings that had been owned by local business magnates and in beautiful landscaped gardens. Ramada Jarvis went into liquidation in September 2011, ceasing trade on every hotel formerly franchised from Ramada. Ramada's United Kingdom operations came to an end. Shortly after, selected Days Hotels were rebranded as Ramada hotels, bringing the brand back to the United Kingdom.

=== Other countries ===
In Australia, Ramada Inn Parkville is being operated by company. Previously it was a traditional motel in Parkville, Melbourne affiliated with the Australian "Golden Chain" group of hotels and motels. It underwent extensive renovation at one point but was known locally for its use of the Uncle Ben vintage logo and idiosyncratic abbreviation of the word "kilometre" on its signage. The motel was rebranded in c.2006–09 as "Parade Inn".

Ramada manages three properties in Indonesia, two located at Bali and one at Surakarta. It manages three hotels on Sri Lanka's western coast, under the "Ramada" name, including one in Sri Lanka's capital Colombo. The Ramada Colombo used to be the Holiday Inn Colombo but management has changed.

Ramada International also operates five hotels in Pakistan, under the same name "Ramada", in cities including Karachi, Islamabad, Lahore and Multan and Gilgit. Ramada manages one property in Mongolia, which is located in Ulaanbaatar. There are many hotels of Ramada operating in India as well. Ramada has one hotel in Bangladesh in Cox's Bazar.

== See also ==
- Ramada International
