= Sun City Festival =

Master-planned community in Maricopa County, Arizona

Coordinates: 33.665347°N 112.621324°W

Sun City Festival is an age-restricted master-planned community in Maricopa County, Arizona, located within the city boundary of northern Buckeye, Arizona. It is approximately 10 miles west of Surprise, Arizona developed by PulteGroup.
