= La Palma, Arizona =

- Populated place
- Location within the state of Arizona La Palma (the United States)
- Coordinates: 32°52′45″N 111°30′54″W
- Country: United States
- State: Arizona
- County: Pinal
- Elevation: 1,480 ft (450 m)
- Time zone: UTC-7 (Mountain (MST))
  - Summer (DST): UTC-7 (MST)
- Area code: 520
- FIPS code: 04-40140
- GNIS feature ID: 6811

La Palma was established in 1927 and is a populated place situated in Pinal County, Arizona, United States. It has an estimated elevation of 1,470 feet (450 m) above sea level. The name is Spanish for "The Palm".
