= James G. Boswell II =

- Born: March 10, 1923; Greensboro, Georgia, U.S.
- Died: April 3, 2009 (aged 86); Indian Wells, California, U.S.
- Family: James Griffin Boswell (uncle)

James G. Boswell II (March 10, 1923 – April 3, 2009) was the head of J. G. Boswell Company, a company that Boswell built from a large family-held cotton farm into an agribusiness giant.

After a stint in the Navy during World War II, Boswell attended Stanford University, earning a degree in economics. During his career, he sat on various corporate boards, including that of General Electric.

Boswell inherited the J. G. Boswell Co. from his uncle James Griffin Boswell. Boswell grew the acreage more than three times to a peak of more than 200,000 acres (810 km^{2}). In addition to increasing the size, Boswell focused on developing more productive cultivars and other technological advances to increase output and efficiency. Among his innovations was using lasers to level fields.

Boswell used the company's influence to successfully lobby for advantageous land and water policies in the state, including the construction of the Pine Flat Dam on the border of Kings Canyon National Park. The dam stemmed water flow to Tulare Lake, the now dry bed of which is a central part of the company's land.

During record-breaking 1969 rains, local residents clamored for floodwaters from Pine Flat Lake to be diverted to Buena Vista Lake. Representation on the irrigation district board, however, was determined by the value of landowners' land, and J. G. Boswell Company owned the majority of land in the district. J. G. Boswell Co. voted to block the floodwater diversion so that its crops on the Buena Vista lakebed would not be destroyed.

Residents whose homes were destroyed by the flood sued. Limiting suffrage to landowners violated the one man, one vote guarantee in the U.S. Constitution, they alleged, because the irrigation district can levy taxes, exercise eminent domain, and decide whose land gets flooded. In 1973, a divided United States Supreme Court disagreed, finding that a private company can exercise control of the irrigation district because flood control is not an important government function.

== Legacy ==
Due to a large amount of land being sold by the Boswell Company to Sun City, namely the Marinette Ranch, numerous references to Boswell may be found there, such as Boswell Blvd and Banner Health’s Boswell Memorial Hospital.
