= Las Guijas, Arizona =

- Populated place
- Location within the state of Arizona Las Guijas (the United States)
- Coordinates: 31°40′13″N 111°22′55″W
- Country: United States
- State: Arizona
- County: Pima
- Elevation: 3,451 ft (1,052 m)
- Time zone: UTC-7 (Mountain (MST))
  - Summer (DST): UTC-7 (MST)
- Area code: 520
- FIPS code: 04-40310
- GNIS feature ID: 5892

Las Guijas is a populated place situated in Pima County, Arizona, United States. It has an estimated elevation of 3,451 feet (1,052 m) above sea level. The name, as with the nearby mountains of the same name, comes from 19th century Spanish miners referring to las guijas for "the rubble" as the placer gold they were working occurred in the gravels or conglomerates along the stream valleys and gulches draining the range.
