= Lone Star, Arizona =

- Populated place
- Location within the state of Arizona Lone Star (the United States)
- Coordinates: 32°48′59″N 109°40′52″W
- Country: United States
- State: Arizona
- County: Graham
- Elevation: 2,953 ft (900 m)
- Time zone: UTC-7 (Mountain (MST))
  - Summer (DST): UTC-7 (MST)
- Area code: 928
- FIPS code: 41820
- GNIS feature ID: 7310

Lone Star is a populated place situated in Graham County, Arizona, United States. The community is located eight miles north of Solomonville and was named after the nearby mine and mountain.
