= Spur Industries, Inc. v. Del E. Webb Development Co. =

Arizona Supreme Court case involving nuisance law (1972)

Spur Industries v. Del E. Webb Development Co., 108 Ariz. 178, 494 P.2d 700 (1972) is a Supreme Court of Arizona case that demonstrates the principles of nuisance law. It is also used in at least one law school remedies case book to demonstrate special injunction principles.

The case involves the owner of a livestock feedlot, Spur Industries, and Del E. Webb Development Co., the developer of a retirement community, Sun City, Arizona. Both enterprises beginning small, they eventually grew large and close enough to one another that the stench of manure and the infestation of flies from the feedlot were both affecting current residents of Sun City, and inhibiting future sales. Webb brought suit for an injunction against the further operation of the feedlot. The lower court granted the injunction, ordering Spur to shut down operations.

The court held that the injunction was proper. Distinguishing between private and public nuisances, the former being remedied often only by damages, at least where the costs of injunction are great on the defendant, the court determined that the feedlot was a public nuisance. This decision was made in large part because an Arizona statute called any "place in populous areas which constitutes a breeding place for flies . . . " and other animals that can carry disease is a public nuisance. Determining south Sun City to be a "populous area" the court said that injunction was thus proper.

Given the equities the court crafted a special injunction, however. Citing the "coming to a nuisance" doctrine, which prohibits equitable relief for a homeowner who purchases a home within the reach of the nuisance, the court said that Webb must indemnify Spur for his losses as a result of a move or shutdown of his enterprise. The court reasoned that, whereas the "coming to a nuisance" doctrine usually bars relief, there was a public interest at play here, and Webb's choice to come to the nuisance could not preclude the public from being protected from the nuisance. Thus, the case was remanded for determination of what the damages should be.
