= Marion William Isbell =

Marion William Isbell (August 12, 1905 – October 20, 1988) was an American restaurateur and founder of Ramada Inns, Inc.

== Biography ==
Isbell was born to Howard James Isbell in Whitehaven, Tennessee upon his passing in 1905 he was orphaned with his two brothers James Washington and Leon Rain Isbell before he was 5. The brothers were placed in an orphanage briefly and then resided with relatives in Memphis. He worked throughout his childhood, first in the Isbell rice fields in England, Arkansas, after dropping out of school he worked as an errand boy. At 16, he moved to Chicago to work as a dishwasher, cook and soda jerk. He first got into the restaurant business in 1934, opening the first Isbell's Restaurant.

In 1929, Isbell took a cross-country trip with his wife, Ingrid, when he had the idea of building comfortable roadside inns. In 1954, he made the dream a reality with a group of Phoenix investors and began buying motels. He became chairman of Ramada Inns Inc., a 63-motel chain in 1962. He was chairman until 1973 before retiring in 1979.

Isbell was president of the National Restaurant Association from 1942 to 1944. In 1955, he ran for Chicago city clerk on the same ticket as Mayor Martin Kennelly.

He died on October 20, 1988, at Scottsdale Healthcare Osborn in Scottsdale, Arizona. On the day of his death, Ramada released their restructuring plan to focus on gambling casinos and selling off its hotel and restaurant businesses.
