= James Griffin Boswell =

Founder of the J. G. Boswell Company (1882–1952)

- Born: May 13, 1882; Penfield, Georgia, U.S.
- Died: September 11, 1952 (aged 70)
- Family: James G. Boswell II (nephew)

James Griffin Boswell (May 13, 1882 – September 11, 1952) was the founder of the J. G. Boswell Company, known today as the world's largest privately owned farm. Primary crops include Pima cotton, alfalfa hay, tomatoes, onions, and wheat, all cultivated on some 135,000 acres (550 km^{2}), mostly in Kings County, California.

Boswell migrated to Pasadena, California as a regional cotton broker from Greene County, Georgia. He established his company in Corcoran, California in 1921. With the help of his brother, William Whittier Boswell, J. G. Boswell began growing and ginning cotton, as well as marketing it.

From 1952 to 1984, the company was headed by J. G.'s nephew and William Boswell's son, James G. Boswell II (1923–2009). He is credited with the company's massive growth during the last half of the twentieth century. In the early 21st century, the J. G. Boswell Company is led by the son of J. G. Boswell II, James W. Boswell. The Boswell family and the Boswell Company have been characterized as "wielding outsized power in the region for nearly a century."

== Biography ==
Born in Penfield, Georgia, in 1882, J. G. Boswell was the son of Minnie Griffin and Joseph Osgood Boswell, both members of pioneer Georgia families. His father was elected as a Georgia State Representative. J. G. Boswell joined the Army in 1903 and left in 1920 due to back problems. He retired at the rank of brevet lieutenant colonel.

He had married Alaine Buck (1886–1938) while still living in Georgia. After living in California for a time and his wife's death, he secondly married Ruth Chandler (1897–1987), daughter of Los Angeles Times publisher Harry Chandler and his second wife Emma Marian Otis, secretary of the Times-Mirror Company.

After building his company farm, Boswell was a major supporter of the California Institute of Technology, serving on the board of trustees in 1946. He also supported Claremont McKenna College, donating $85,000 for a new dormitory, which was named Boswell Hall in his honor.

== J. G. Boswell Company ==
After leaving the army, Boswell started working in Greene County, Georgia, as a regional cotton broker.

Learning about development in California, he migrated there and settled in Pasadena. He bought property in Corcoran, located on Tulare Lake, which used to be the largest body of fresh water in the state. He worked to drain the wetlands around the lake, using dykes, ditches, canals, and dams in order to farm its fertile bed. He established his company in 1921 and started cultivating cotton in California. He was joined by his brother William Whittier Boswell. They managed the processing of the cotton and its marketing, and gradually acquired more property.

Tulare Lake is still home to some of the world's biggest cotton farmers. During the thirties, many farmers from areas affected by the Dust Bowl moved out west and worked on Boswell farms.

== See also ==
- James G. Boswell Foundation
