= Del Webb =

American real-estate developer (1899–1974)

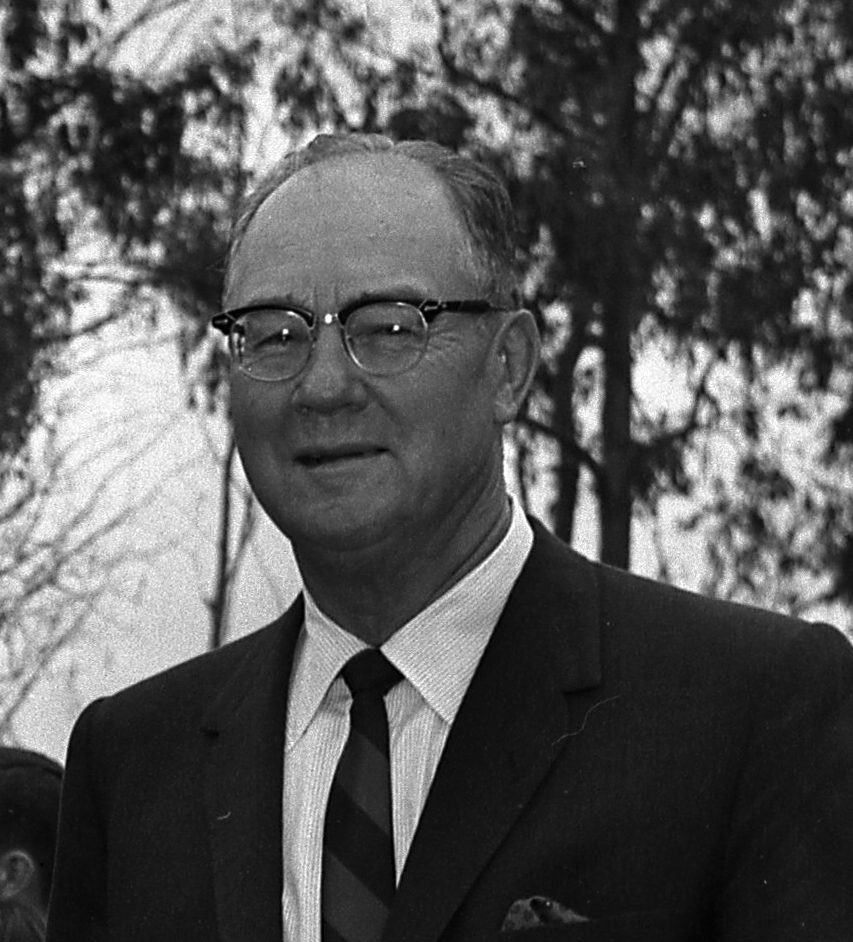
- Born: Delbert Eugene Webb; May 17, 1899; Fresno, California, U.S.
- Died: July 4, 1974 (aged 75); Rochester, Minnesota, U.S.
- Occupation: Real estate developer
- Known for: Co-owner of the New York Yankees (1945–1964); Founder of the Del E. Webb Construction Company
- Spouse(s): Hazel Lenora Church (1919–1952); Toni Ince Webb (1961–1974)

Delbert Eugene Webb (May 17, 1899 – July 4, 1974) was an American real-estate developer and a co-owner of the New York Yankees baseball club. He founded and developed the retirement community of Sun City, Arizona, which was built by his Del E. Webb Construction Company.

== Early years ==
Webb was born in Fresno, California, to Ernest G. Webb, a fruit farmer, and Henrietta S. Webb. He dropped out of high school to become a carpenter's apprentice, and in 1919, he married Hazel Lenora Church, a graduate nurse. In 1920, Webb was a ship fitter, and they were living with his parents and two younger brothers in Placer County, California. At the age of 28, he suffered typhoid fever, and moved to Phoenix, Arizona, to recover.

== Career ==
In 1928, Webb began Del E. Webb Construction Company. He received many military contracts during World War II. In 1942, he led the construction of the Poston War Relocation Center in Arizona, one of ten Japanese-American internment camps built during World War II, which held over 17,000 internees. Construction began on March 27, 1942, and was completed in three weeks. This was accomplished by a crew of 5,000 laborers working double shifts.

A former semiprofessional baseball player and a lifelong fan, Webb and partners Dan Topping and Larry MacPhail purchased the New York Yankees in 1945 for $2.8 million from the estate of Col. Jacob Ruppert, Jr. After buying out MacPhail in October 1947, Webb and Topping remained owners of the Yankees until selling the club to CBS in 1964 for $11.2 million. During those 20 seasons, the Yankees were in 15 World Series, winning 10.

In 1946, mob boss Benjamin "Bugsy" Siegel hired Webb as the general contractor for the Flamingo Hotel and Casino in Las Vegas. After boasting about his claim that he had personally killed 16 men, Siegel said to Webb, "Del, don't worry, we only kill each other", after seeing the panicked look on Webb’s face. Aside from Howard Hughes, Webb would become the largest casino owner in Nevada after his Webb Corporation acquired the Sahara Nevada Corporation and its holdings of the Sahara and Mint hotels in Las Vegas.

In 1948, Webb was contracted to build 600 houses and a shopping center called Pueblo Gardens in Tucson, Arizona. San Manuel, Arizona, a mining company town and later a resort town, followed. Established in 1953, the town was built by Webb (along with M.O.W. Homes Inc.) for the Magma Copper Company. It required the building of streets, shopping centers, schools, a hospital, and parks. This was a prelude to Sun City, Arizona, which launched on January 1, 1960, with five home models, a shopping center, a recreation center, and a golf course. The opening weekend drew 100,000 people, 10 times more than expected, and resulted in a Time cover story.

== Personal life ==
In 1919, Webb married his childhood sweetheart, Hazel Lenora Church. They divorced in 1952. In 1961, Webb married Toni Ince, then aged 41, a buyer for Bullocks Wilshire department store in Los Angeles. Webb was elected to the Gaming Hall of Fame in 2000.

== Death ==
Webb died at age 75 in Rochester, Minnesota, on July 4, 1974, following surgery for lung cancer.
