= Murder of Noor Almaleki =

Iraqi-American victim of honor killing (1989–2009)

Noor Faleh Almaleki
- نور فالح المالكي
- Born: February 18, 1989; Iraq
- Died: November 2, 2009 (aged 20); Phoenix, Arizona, U.S.
- Cause of death: Struck by motor vehicle
- Education: Glendale Community College, Dysart High School
- Occupations: Student, various part-time jobs

Noor Faleh Almaleki (Arabic: نور فالح المالكي; c. 1989 – November 2, 2009) was an Iraqi American woman who was murdered by her father in an honor killing.

== Background ==
Noor's family left Iraq when she was four years old, immigrating to Glendale, Arizona in the mid-1990s, and later moving to the Paradise Views subdivision of Phoenix. Noor's father, Faleh Hassan Almaleki, originated from Basra, Iraq and later became a US citizen, while Noor graduated from Dysart High School in El Mirage. Before her death, she was attending Glendale Community College.

Growing up, Noor was expected to cook, clean, and help to take care of her six younger siblings or else she would be beaten, according to one account. Noor considered herself Muslim and was fluent in Arabic, but had begun to assimilate into American culture, shifting her attire and social habits. Faleh strongly disapproved of this assimilation, particularly objecting to her socializing with men.

In 2008, Noor was taken to Iraq after having a marriage to an older cousin arranged for her by her father, but upon returning to Arizona she began dating someone of her own choosing. Abigail Pesta, the editor-at-large of Marie Claire, wrote, "It's unclear whether a wedding actually took place."

In an attempt to distance herself from the physical abuse she received at home, Noor began to move in and out of the family home, living with different friends while being hunted down by her parents. In the spring of 2009, Noor moved into her own apartment, but lost income when her family members turned up at her places of employment, forcing her to move back into her family's house. In June 2009, she moved into another Iraqi American household, with whom her family had strained relations. She began dating Marwan Alebadi, the son of the family, which upset her relatives.

== Crime and arrest ==
On October 20, 2009, Noor was interpreting for her boyfriend's mother, Amal Edan Khalaf, at an office of the Arizona Department of Economic Security in Peoria. After Noor and Amal left the office, Faleh struck them both with his vehicle. This left Noor with a brain bleed, partial paralysis, and several other injuries, consequently slipping into a coma. The collision also fractured Amal's pelvis, though she survived. Faleh promptly fled the scene.

According to police records, Noor's family had attempted to assist Faleh in fleeing the country. Faleh drove to Mexico, abandoned his car in the city of Nogales, and boarded a flight to London from Mexico City. He was caught by the UK Border Agency on October 29, and did not grant him entry, being subsequently arrested following British deportation to the United States.

In the days following the incident, Noor underwent spinal surgery, where she was operated upon under police protection. After speaking with Noor's family, authorities decided not to reveal her location, fearing for her safety. A urinary tract infection caused by the incident would eventually spread to Noor’s heart. Maricopa County medical examiner Dr. Kevin Horn stated that this infection, not direct injuries from the collision, was her ultimate cause of death. On November 2 she was pronounced brain dead, and at the request of her family, her life support was disconnected.

== Criminal penalty and aftermath ==
The trial began on January 24, 2011. At the trial, Faleh's lawyers stated that he did not intend to kill the two women with his vehicle and was therefore guilty of second-degree murder. Prosecutors attempted to get a first-degree murder conviction, but did not seek capital punishment against Faleh. On February 22, 2011 Faleh was convicted of second-degree murder, as the jury did not find that the act was premeditated.

On April 15, 2011, Faleh was sentenced to 34.5 years in prison to be served consecutively on multiple counts: one count of second-degree murder, one of aggravated assault, and two of leaving the scene of an accident. He was incarcerated for 13 years before dying on November 10, 2024, at the age of 63.

Soon after the incident, friends of Noor's established a Facebook group in her honor; by 2010 it had garnered around 4,000 members, though the page has since been deleted.

On the night of September 1, 2012, 48 Hours Mystery aired an episode about the incident.

== See also ==
- Honor killings in the United States
