= List of casinos in Arizona =

This is a list of casinos in Arizona. All of them are operated as Native American gaming facilities.

Casinos in the U.S. State of Arizona
Casino	Nearest City	County	State	District	Type	Comments
Apache Gold Casino Resort	San Carlos	Gila	Arizona		Land-based	Owned by the San Carlos Apache
Apache Sky Casino	Dudleyville	Pinal	Arizona		Land-based	Owned by the San Carlos Apache
BlueWater Resort and Casino	Parker	La Paz	Arizona		Land-based	Owned by the Colorado River Indian Tribes; Wakeboard park located on premises
Bucky's Casino	Prescott	Yavapai	Arizona		Land-based	Owned by the Yavapai-Prescott Tribe
Casino Arizona	Scottsdale	Maricopa	Arizona		Land-based	Owned by the Salt River Pima–Maricopa
Casino del Sol	Tucson	Pima	Arizona		Land-based	Owned by the Pascua Yaqui Tribe
Casino of the Sun	Tucson	Pima	Arizona		Land-based	Owned by the Pascua Yaqui Tribe
Cliff Castle Casino	Camp Verde	Yavapai	Arizona		Land-based	Owned by the Yavapai–Apache Nation
Cocopah Resort Casino	Somerton	Yuma	Arizona		Land-based	Owned by the Cocopah Indian Tribe
Desert Diamond Casino	Why	Pima	Arizona	Hickiwan	Land-based	Owned by the Tohono Oʼodham Nation; formerly known as Golden Hassan Casino
Desert Diamond Casino, Sahuarita	Sahuarita	Pima	Arizona	San Xavier	Land-based	Owned by the Tohono Oʼodham Nation
Desert Diamond Casino–West Valley	Glendale	Maricopa	Arizona	San Lucy	Land-based	Owned by the Tohono Oʼodham Nation
Desert Diamond Casino–White Tanks	Waddell	Maricopa	Arizona		Land-based	Owned by the Tohono Oʼodham Nation
Desert Diamond Hotel & Casino	Tucson	Pima	Arizona	San Xavier	Land-based	Owned by the Tohono Oʼodham Nation
We-Ko-Pa Casino & Resort	Fountain Hills	Maricopa	Arizona		Land-based	Owned by the Fort McDowell Yavapai Nation
Harrah's Ak-Chin Casino	Maricopa	Pinal	Arizona		Land-based	Owned by the Ak-Chin Indian Community
Hon-Dah Resort Casino	Pinetop-Lakeside	Navajo	Arizona		Land-based	Owned by the White Mountain Apache Tribe
Lone Butte Casino	Chandler	Maricopa	Arizona		Land-based	Owned by the Gila River Indian Community; renovated in 2015
Mazatzal Casino	Payson	Gila	Arizona		Land-based	Owned by the Tonto Apache
Paradise Casino	Yuma	Yuma	Arizona		Land-based	Owned by the Quechan Tribe
Santan Mountain Hotel & Casino	Chandler	Maricopa	Arizona		Land-based	Owned by the Gila River Indian Community
Spirit Mountain Casino	Mohave Valley	Mohave	Arizona		Land-based	Owned by the Fort Mojave Indian Tribe; renovated in 2015
Talking Stick Resort	Scottsdale	Maricopa	Arizona		Land-based	Owned by the Salt River Pima–Maricopa Indian Community
Twin Arrows Navajo Casino Resort	Flagstaff	Coconino	Arizona		Land-based	Owned by the Navajo Nation
Vee Quiva Hotel & Casino	Laveen	Maricopa	Arizona		Land-based	Owned by the Gila River Indian Community; hotel opened in 2013
Wild Horse Pass Hotel & Casino	Chandler	Maricopa	Arizona		Land-based	Owned by the Gila River Indian Community; hotel opened in 2009
Yavapai Casino	Prescott	Yavapai	Arizona		Land-based	Owned by the Yavapai-Prescott Tribe

== See also ==
- List of casinos in the United States
- Arizona Department of Gaming
