= Desert Diamond Arena =

Indoor arena in Glendale, Arizona, U.S.

- The Pit

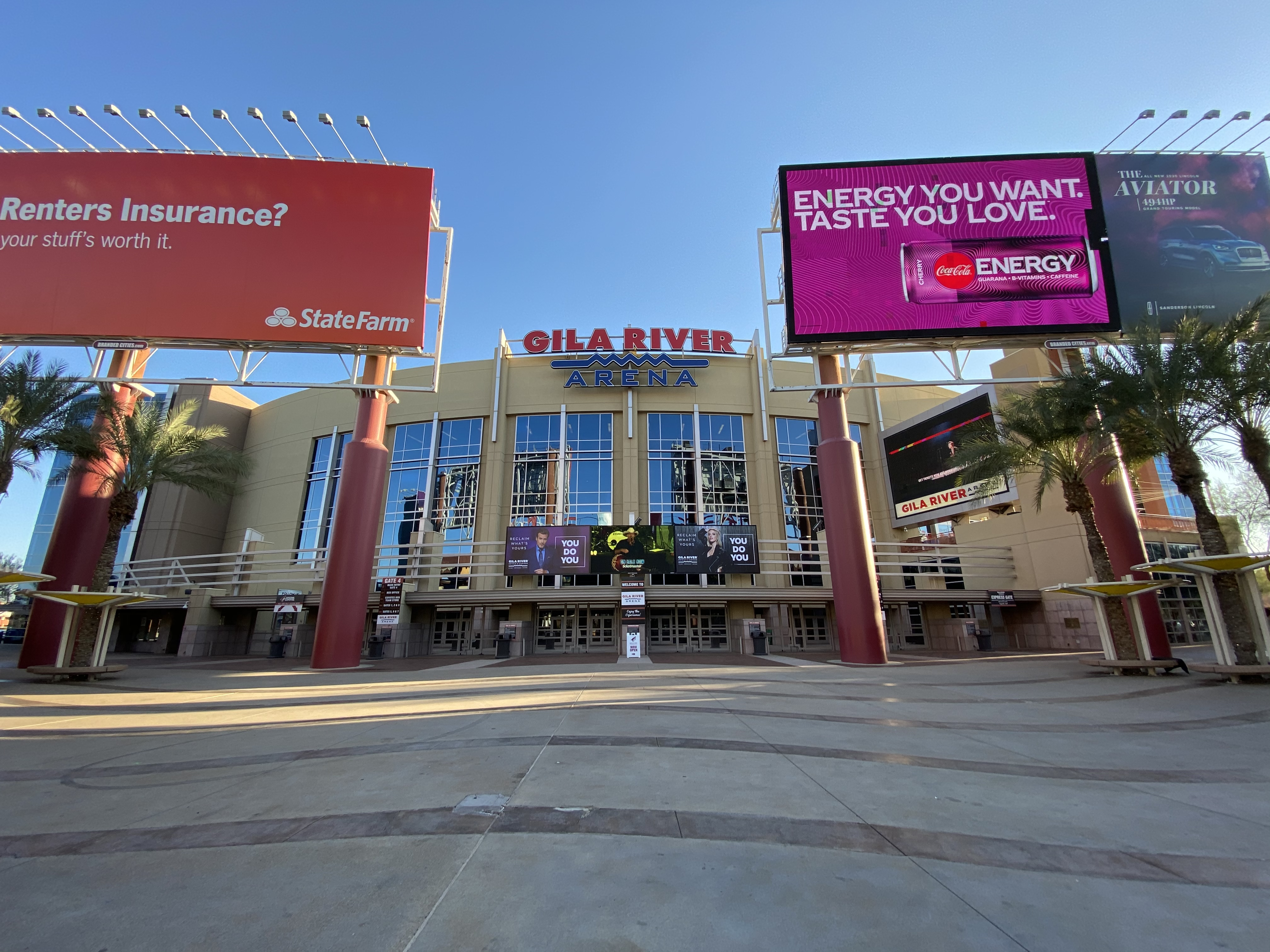
- Desert Diamond Arena, then named Gila River Arena, in 2020

- Location in Maricopa County Location in Arizona Location in USA
- Former names: Glendale Arena (2003–2006); Jobing.com Arena (2006–2014); Gila River Arena (2014–2022)
- Address: 9400 W Maryland Ave
- Location: Glendale, Arizona, U.S.
- Coordinates: 33°31′55″N 112°15′40″W
- Owner: City of Glendale
- Operator: ASM Global
- Capacity: Concert events: 19,000; Basketball: 18,300; Ice hockey: 17,125

Construction
- Groundbreaking: April 3, 2002
- Opened: December 26, 2003
- Cost: US$220 million ($394 million in 2025 dollars)
- Architect: HOK Sport
- Project manager: ICON Venue Group
- Structural engineers: Martin/Martin Consulting Engineers, Inc.
- Services engineer: Syska Hennessy
- General contractor: Perini Building Company

Tenants
- Phoenix/Arizona Coyotes (NHL) (2003–2022); Arizona Sting (NLL) (2003–2007); Arizona Ridge Riders (PBR) (2022–present); Arizona Rattlers (IFL) (2024–present)

Website
- desertdiamondarena.com

Desert Diamond Arena (originally Glendale Arena and formerly Jobing.com Arena and Gila River Arena) is an indoor entertainment arena located in Glendale, Arizona, which anchors the 223-acre, $1 billion Westgate Entertainment District.

Located about 12.5 miles (20.1 km) northwest of downtown Phoenix, the arena was built east of Arizona Loop 101 (Agua Fria Freeway) and on the north side of West Maryland Avenue at a cost of $220 million. The arena is owned by the City of Glendale and managed by ASM Global. Desert Diamond Arena is home to the Indoor Football League's Arizona Rattlers (since 2024) and was home to the National Hockey League’s (NHL) Arizona Coyotes from 2003 until 2022. Since then it hosts concerts and other entertainment acts throughout the year. Desert Diamond Arena has a seating capacity of 17,125 for ice hockey, 18,300 for basketball and about 19,000 for concert events. The arena has 3,075 club seats and 87 luxury suites.

== History ==
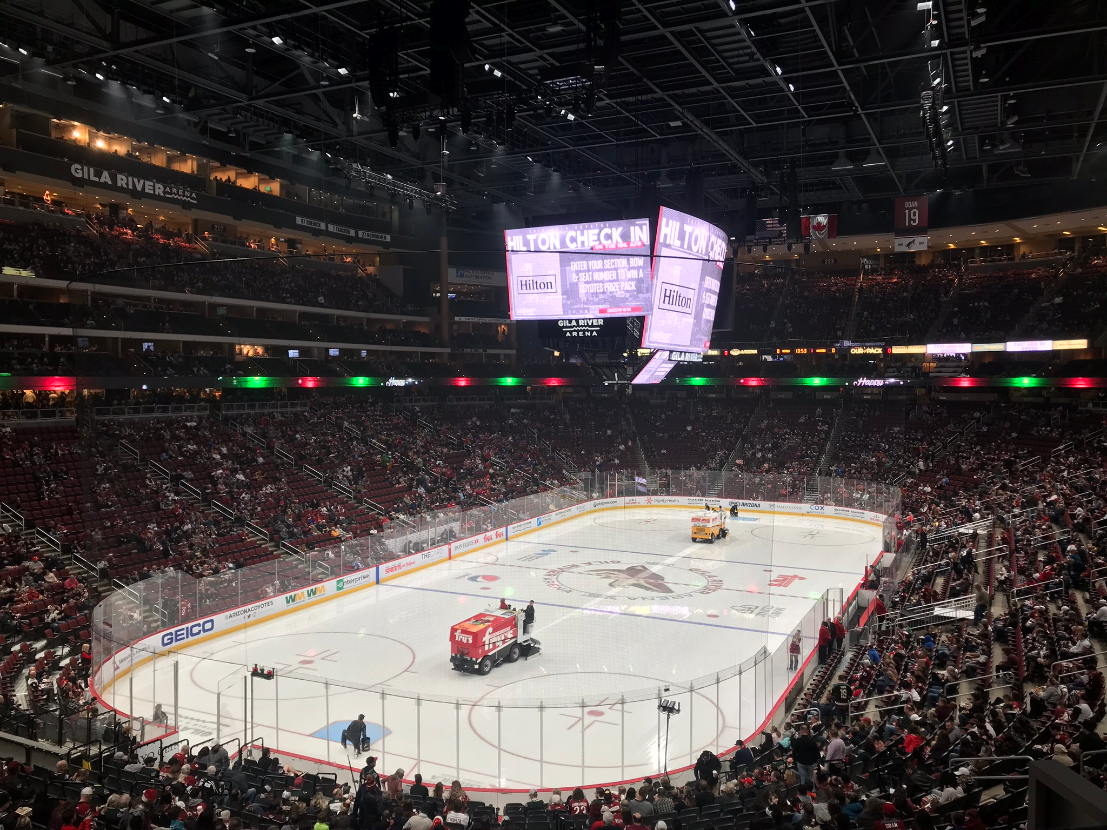
Desert Diamond Arena before a Coyotes game; from south end, looking north

After the Winnipeg Jets relocated to Phoenix in 1996, they spent their first 7+ seasons playing at America West Arena (AWA) as the Phoenix Coyotes. AWA had been designed as the new home of the NBA's Phoenix Suns only four years earlier, so it had to be quickly retrofitted for hockey. The arena floor was barely large enough to fit an NHL regulation size hockey rink and some seats on the upper level hung over the boards. That obstructed the views for up to 3,000 spectators. As a result, before the team's second season in Phoenix, its hockey seating capacity was reduced from 18,000+ seats to 16,210 — then the second-smallest capacity in the NHL. After the Colorado Avalanche moved from McNichols Sports Arena into the Pepsi Center in 1999 and the Toronto Maple Leafs from Maple Leaf Gardens into the Air Canada Centre later that same season, America West Arena became the smallest NHL venue.

When the Coyotes were sold to a partnership led by Phoenix real estate developer Steve Ellman, they committed to build a new arena in the Phoenix suburb of Glendale. A lease agreement was signed with the City of Glendale in 2001, construction began on April 3, 2002, and the arena opened midway through the 2003–04 NHL season. The National Lacrosse League's Arizona Sting hosted the first sporting event in the arena, a 16–12 2004 NLL season opening victory against the Vancouver Ravens on December 26, 2003. The next evening, the Phoenix Coyotes hosted their first game before a standing room-only crowd of 19,052 ending in a 3–3 tie against the Nashville Predators. Their first win in Glendale was on December 31, 2003, with a 4-0 victory over the Los Angeles Kings.

On August 19, 2021, the city of Glendale chose not to renew its contract with the Coyotes after the 2021–22 season, effectively evicting the team and putting the franchise's future in Arizona into question. The Coyotes announced they would be seeking to build a new venue in Tempe in response. The final Coyotes home game at the arena was played April 29, 2022, a 5–4 comeback win against the Nashville Predators. After the season, the Coyotes moved their home games to Mullett Arena at Arizona State University, where they played for the 2022–23 and 2023–24 seasons.

Two years after their move, it was discovered through a report in April 2024 that the team did not collect items bearing the Coyotes branding and left them at the arena, including Shane Doan's jersey retirement banner. It was recovered by an arena worker, who gave it to Doan when the word surfaced days after the Coyotes' final NHL game.

=== Concerts and events ===
Desert Diamond Arena has hosted numerous concerts and events since opening in December 2003. A string of concerts in the arena’s inaugural year included performances by Prince, Rod Stewart, Toby Keith, Britney Spears, and Usher. Since then, other acts performing there included U2, RBD, Elton John, The Rolling Stones, Paul McCartney, Bruce Springsteen, Rage Against the Machine, Billie Eilish, Kenny Chesney, Mötley Crüe, Justin Timberlake, Katy Perry, The Eagles, Taylor Swift, Miley Cyrus, Hannah Montana, The Weeknd, Harry Styles, Celine Dion, Coldplay, Eric Church, Justin Bieber, Kendrick Lamar, Ed Sheeran, Shawn Mendes, Sam Smith, Demi Lovato, Bon Jovi, Khalid, Madonna, Pearl Jam, Red Hot Chili Peppers, Usher, John Mayer, Tim McGraw, Faith Hill, The Killers, Florence & The Machine, Enhypen, Lady Gaga, Zach Bryan, Benson Boone, Laufey, Conan Gray, 5 Seconds Of Summer, Megan Moroney, Sombr, Charli XCX, Gracie Abrams, Hatsune Miku and For King & Country.

Desert Diamond Arena events in recent years included UFC on Fox: Poirier vs. Gaethje, UFC 263: Adesanya vs. Vettori 2, UFC Fight Night: Silva vs. Delgado, Jake Paul vs. Anderson Silva, Nitro Circus Live, WWE Raw, WWE SmackDown, Stars on Ice, 2021 Gold Over America Tour, Street League Skateboarding, and WEC 53. The arena has hosted the traveling family-oriented shows Radio City Christmas Spectacular, Sesame Street Live, the Harlem Globetrotters and Cirque du Soleil.

Since 2005, the arena has hosted the Arizona state high school basketball, volleyball, wrestling and cheerleading tournaments in an event called "February Frenzy," resulting from a formal agreement between the City of Glendale and the Arizona Interscholastic Association (AIA).

The highest grossing event in venue history was UFC 263: Adesanya vs. Vettori 2 on June 12, 2021, with 17,208 guests in attendance and $4,281,800 in revenue.

The arena was the temporary home of the Arizona Rattlers arena/indoor football team when their home arena, the Footprint Center, was unavailable due to other events. It hosted the Arena Football League's ArenaBowl XXIX in 2016, the Indoor Football League's playoffs in 2019 and was scheduled to host the team's IFL home season in 2020 prior to the COVID-19 pandemic in Arizona.

Prior to the 2018–19 NHL season, the Coyotes purchased and installed the center-hung scoreboard that was formerly used by the now-defunct Palace of Auburn Hills, replacing the old one inside Desert Diamond Arena. They were not allowed to take the scoreboard with them when they were evicted from the arena in 2022.

The arena was a regular stop for the Professional Bull Riders (PBR)'s Premier Series for several years. Since 2022, it has become the home of the PBR's Arizona Ridge Riders during the PBR Team Series season held from the summer to autumn. In May 2027, the second half of the PBR World Finals will be held at Desert Diamond Arena.

The Arizona Rattlers announced that they would be moving to Desert Diamond Arena permanently in 2024 after using the arena as a temporary home previously. This gave the arena its first tenant since the Coyotes left in 2022.

On May 25, 2025, All Elite Wrestling held their Double or Nothing pay-per-view at the arena.

During the memorial service of conservative activist and Arizona resident Charlie Kirk at nearby State Farm Stadium on September 21, 2025 following his assassination eleven days prior, overflow attendees were sent to Desert Diamond Arena.

== Naming rights ==
Glendale Arena was renamed Jobing.com Arena after a Phoenix-based employment website under a ten-year, $30 million contract established in October 2006.

The Coyotes terminated their agreement with Jobing.com and immediately announced a new nine-year naming and sponsorship deal on August 13, 2014, with Gila River Casinos — a group of tribal casinos that are controlled by the Gila River Indian Community. Former Coyotes President/CEO and Alternate Governor Anthony LeBlanc described the new agreement as the "most significant deal" made by the team under its new IceArizona ownership. With it, the Gila River community became the first federally recognized Native American tribe to hold a naming rights deal with a venue for one of the major professional sports leagues in the United States and Canada.

On August 23, 2022, the arena reached an agreement with Desert Diamond Casino to rename the arena as Desert Diamond Arena.

== Gallery ==
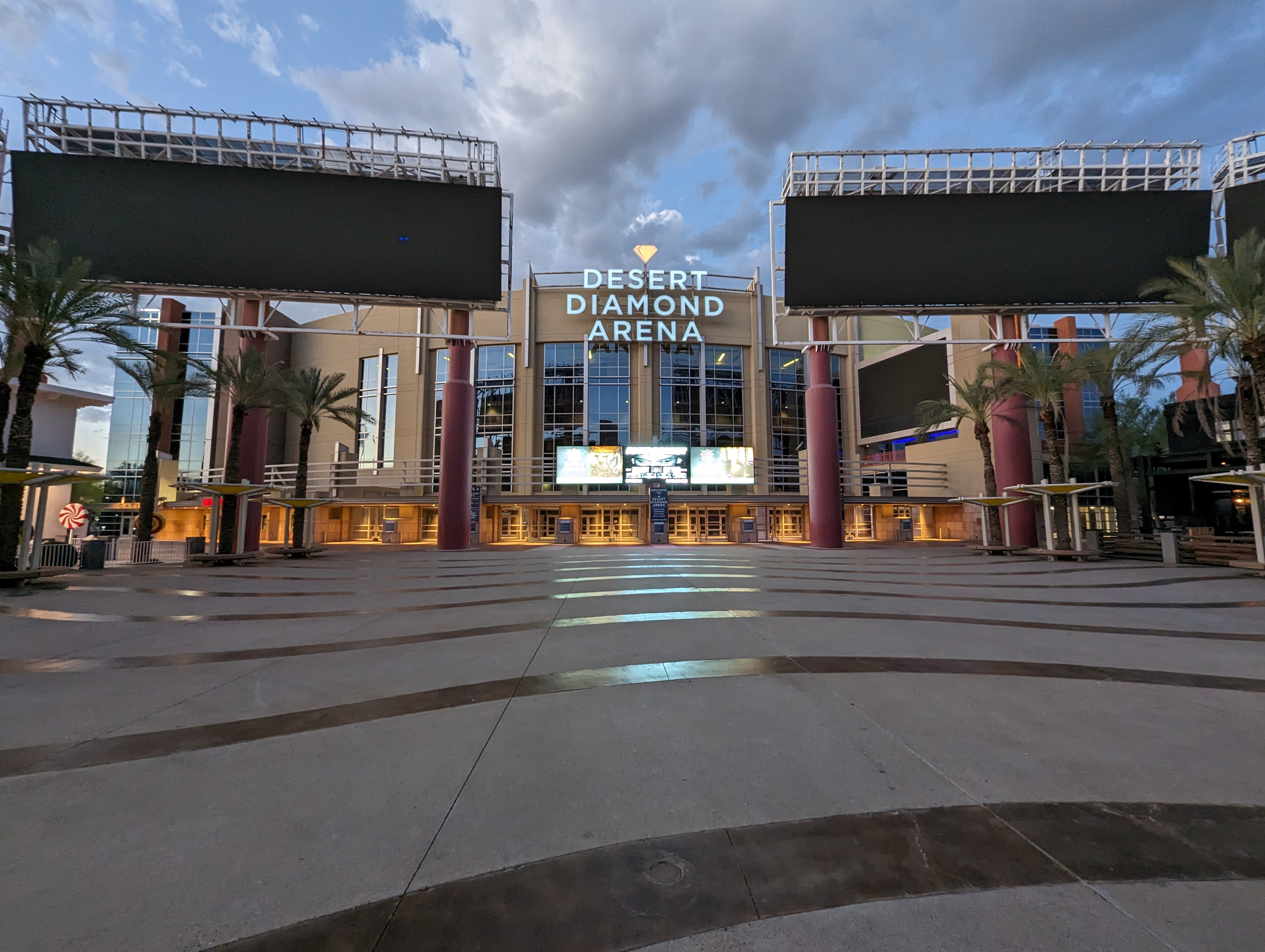
Exterior view of Desert Diamond Arena

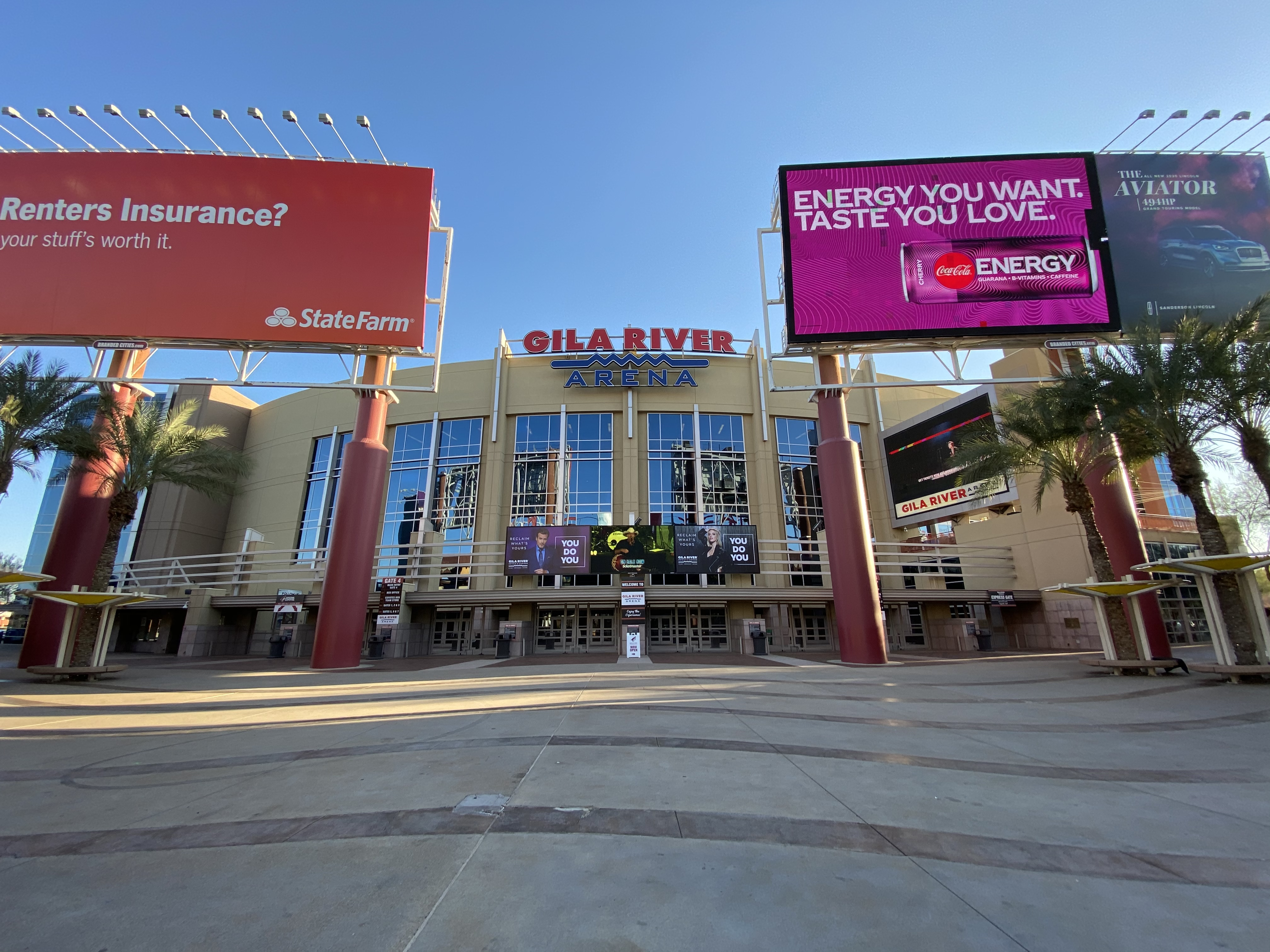
Gate 4 entrance, photographed when the venue was named Gila River Arena

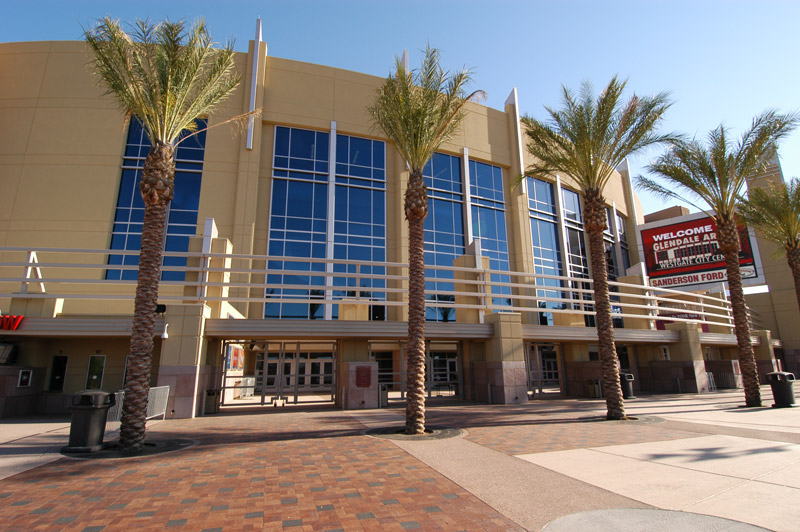
The arena under its original Glendale Arena name

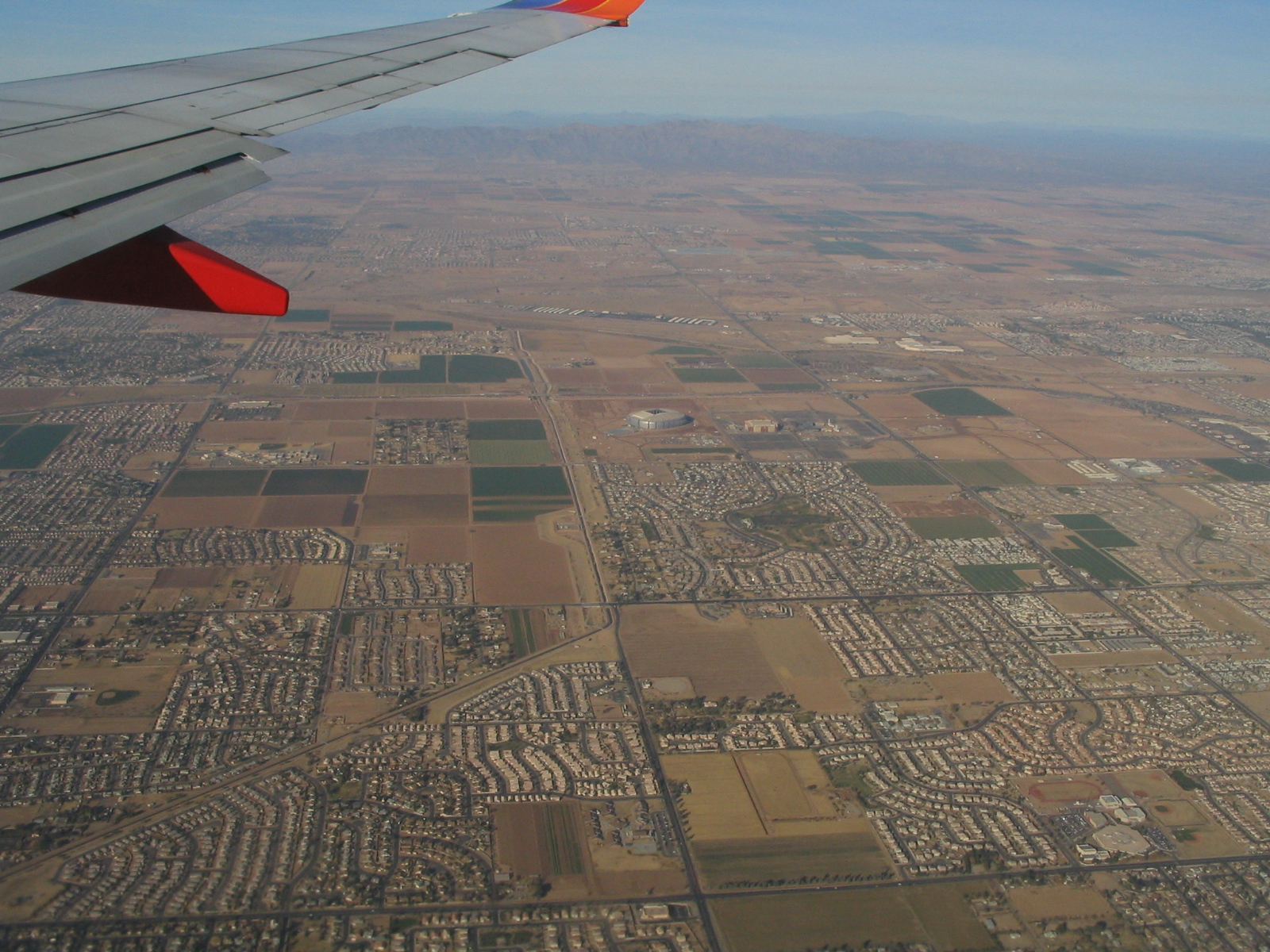
The arena and the surrounding Westgate district

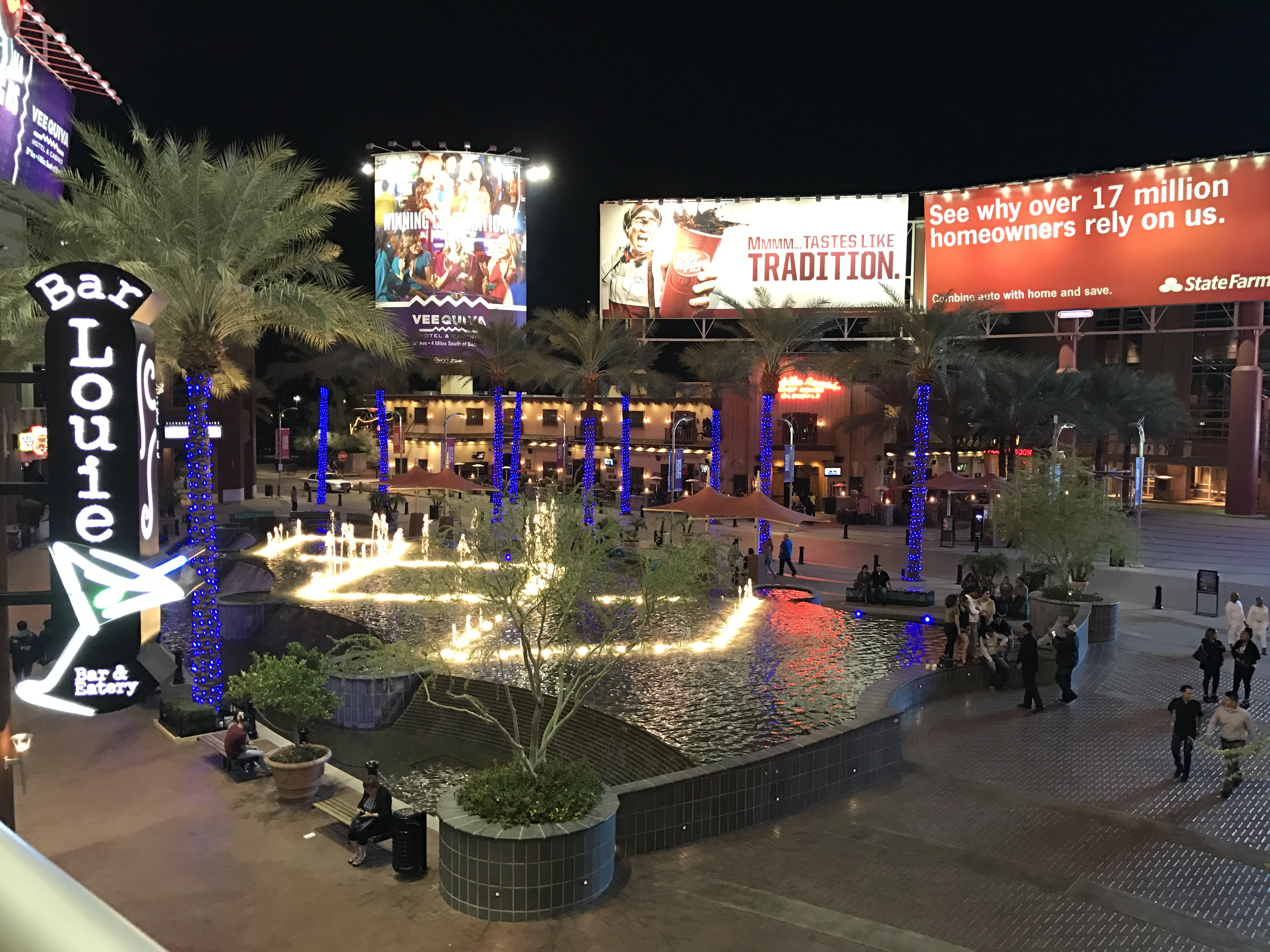
The arena area at night

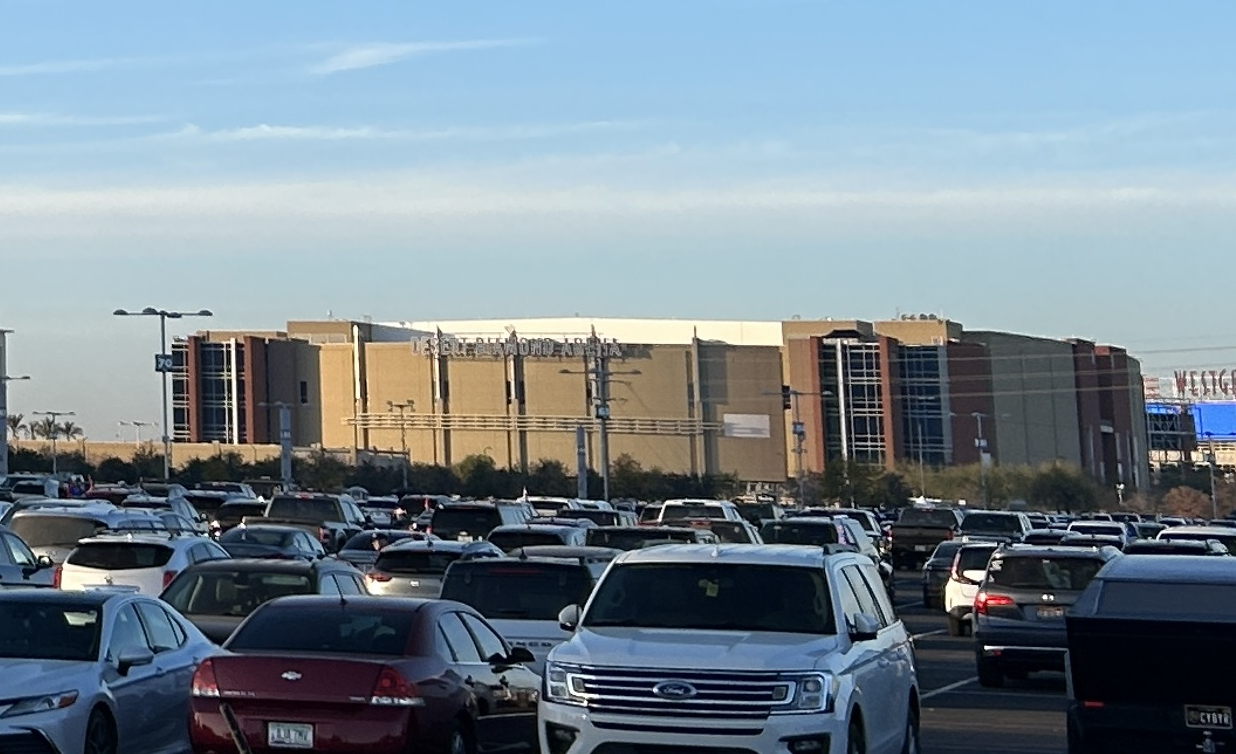
Desert Diamond Arena in 2024

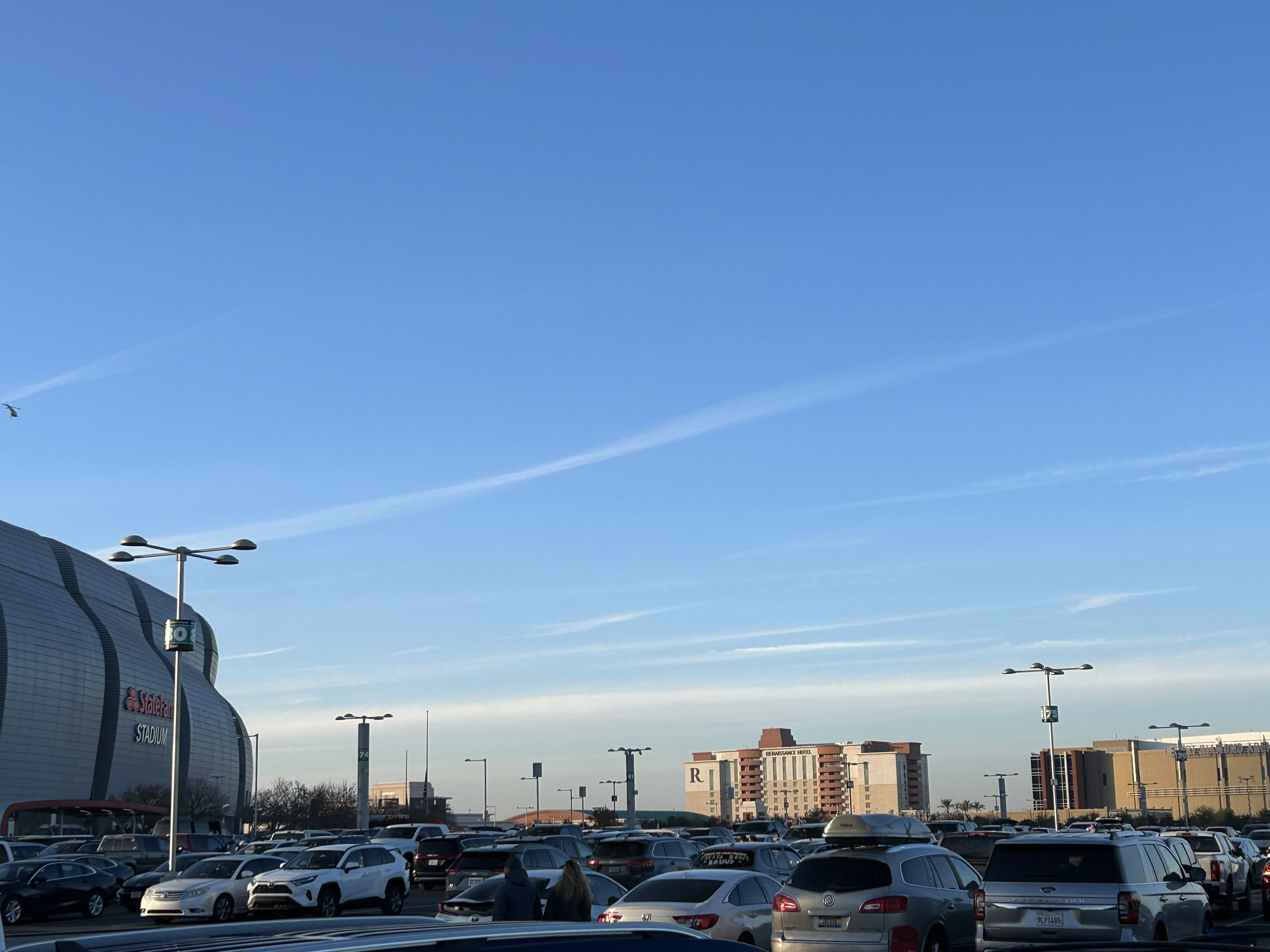
Exterior view

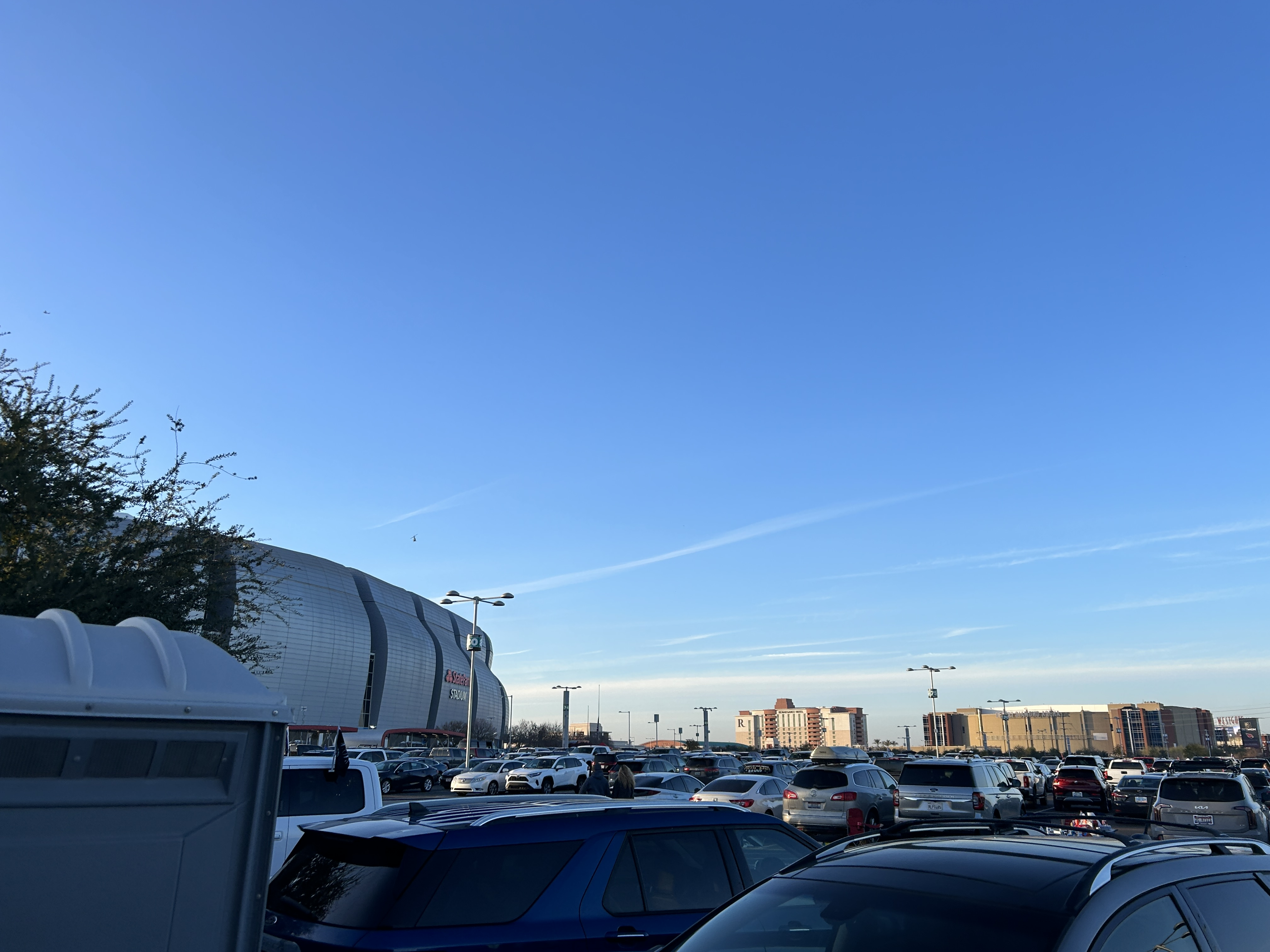
Exterior and surrounding plaza

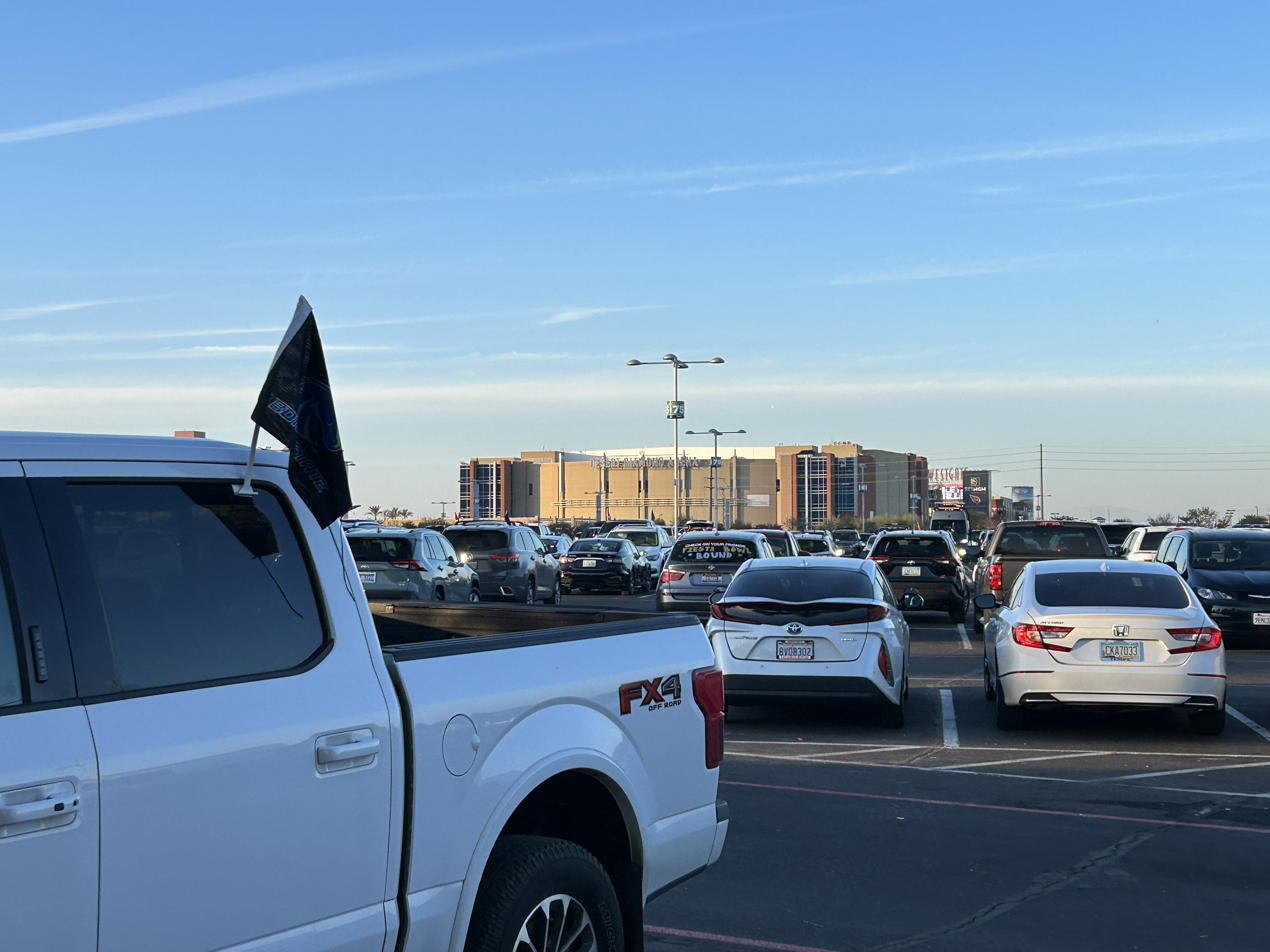
View of the arena complex

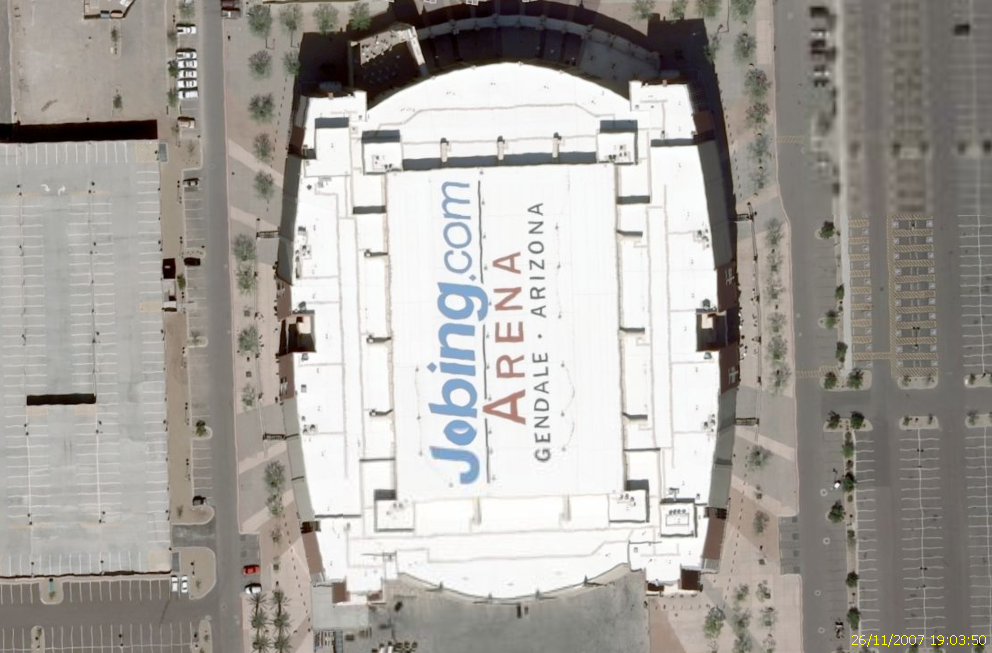
Satellite view when the venue was named Jobing.com Arena

Preceded by America West Arena	Home of the Arizona Coyotes; 2003 – 2022	Succeeded by Mullett Arena
Preceded by Footprint Center	Home of the Arizona Rattlers; 2024 – present	Succeeded by Incumbent
