= Willow Canyon High School =

Coordinates: 33.633313°N 112.444103°W

Location
- 17901 W Lundberg St; Surprise, Arizona 85388; United States

Information
- School type: Public high school
- Motto: Winning Culture
- Established: 2003
- School district: Dysart Unified School District No. 89
- Principal: Lisa Parachini
- Staff: 78.20 (FTE)
- Grades: 9–12
- Enrollment: 1,819 (2023–2024)
- Student to teacher ratio: 23.26
- Colors: Blue, Grey and White
- Mascot: Wildcat
- Rivals: Valley Vista High School
- Yearbook: The Prowler
- Website: dysart.org/wchs

Willow Canyon High School is a public high school located in Surprise, Arizona, United States. Established in 2003, it is part of the Dysart Unified School District and serves students in grades 9 through 12. Willow Canyon provides a variety of programs to meet the needs of its diverse student body, including the International Baccalaureate (IB) Diploma Programme and specialized career-focused courses. The school’s mascot is the Wildcat, and its colors are blue, silver, and white.

== Signature programs ==
=== TV / Media Production ===
This program is designed to provide students with the experience and skills needed to pursue a career in video production.

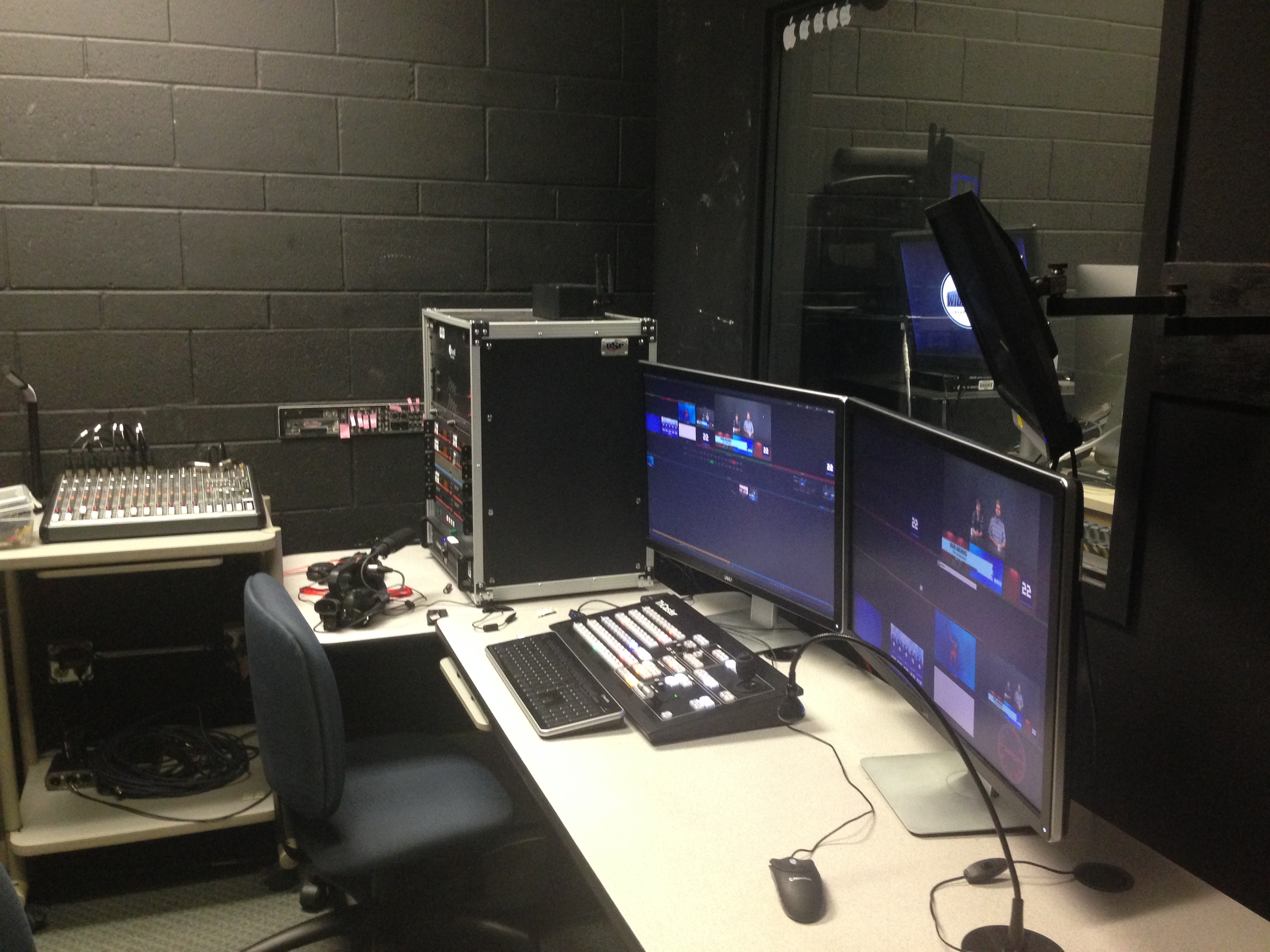
The control room is where lighting, sound, and video is controlled.

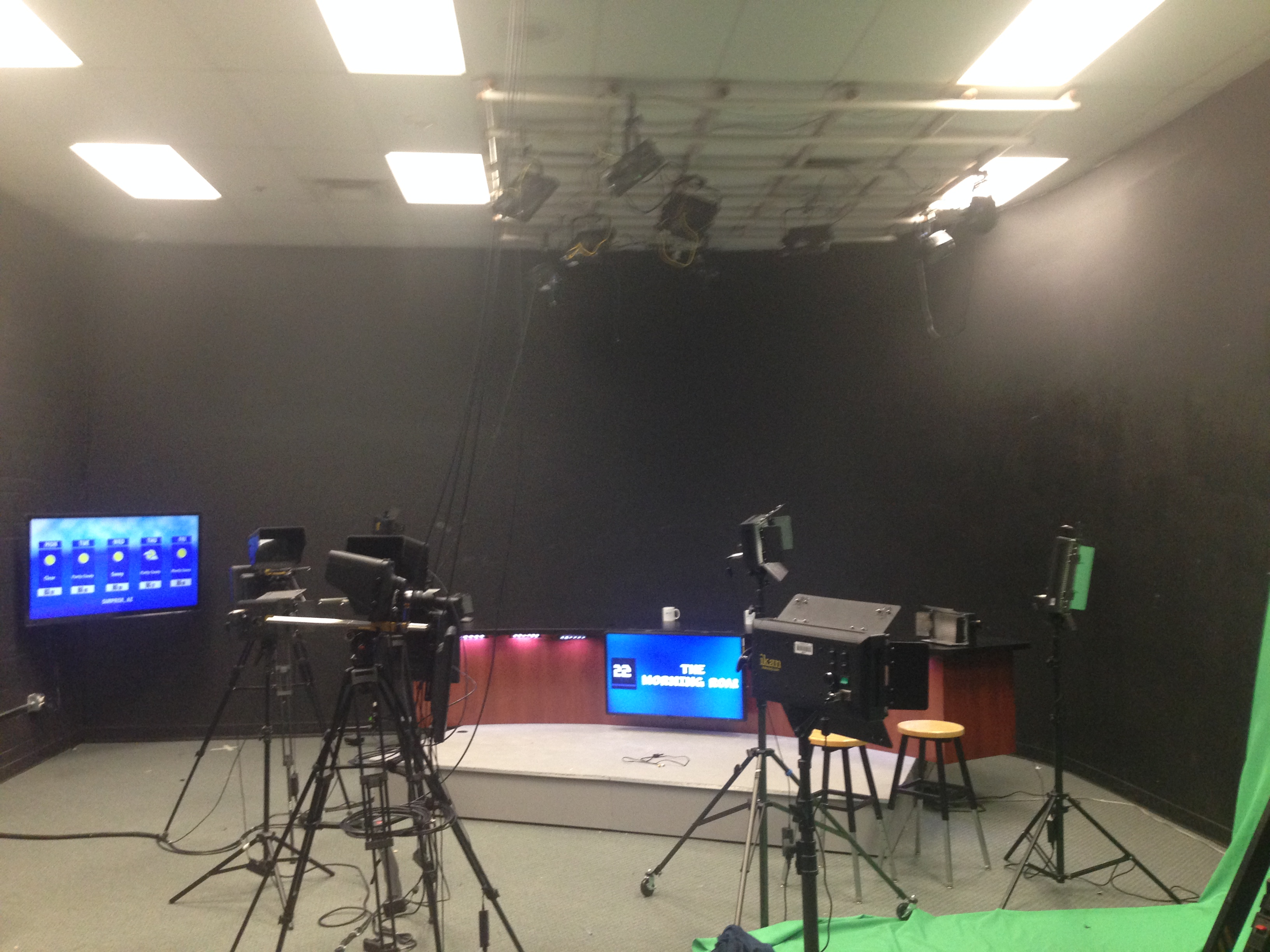
Inside the studio where WCHS announcements are produced.

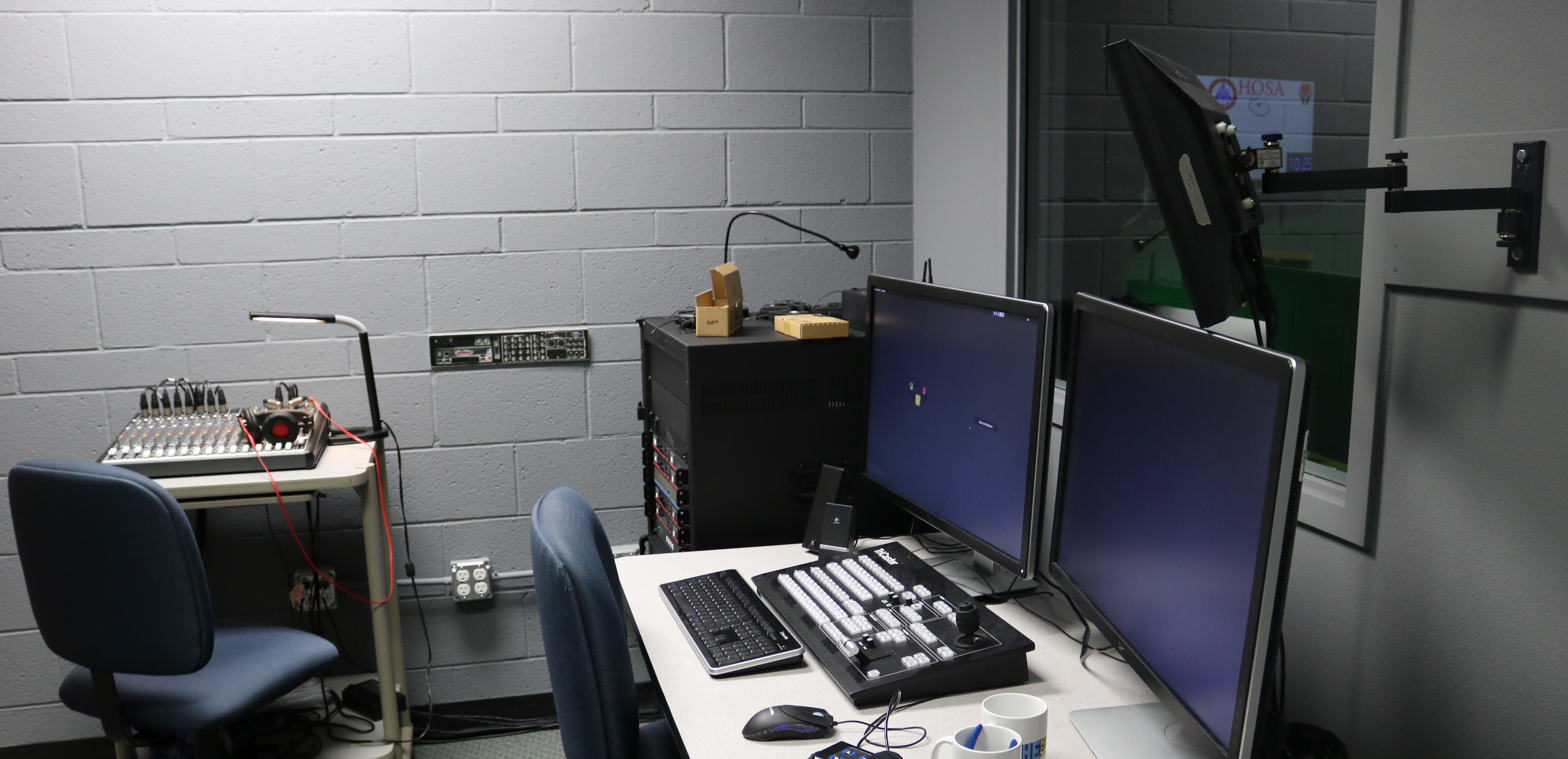
Walls were painted the summer of 2017.

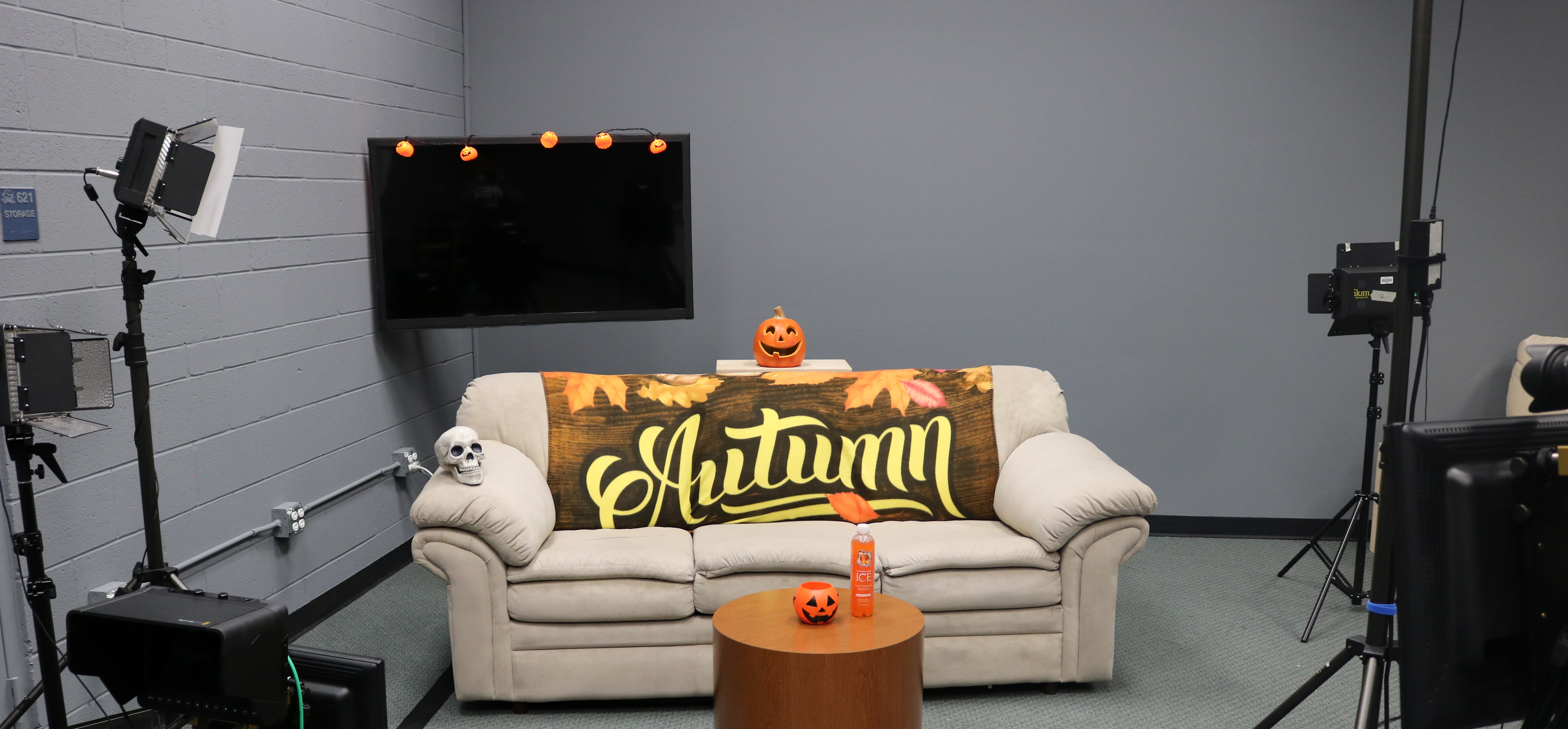
The main set where anchors talk.

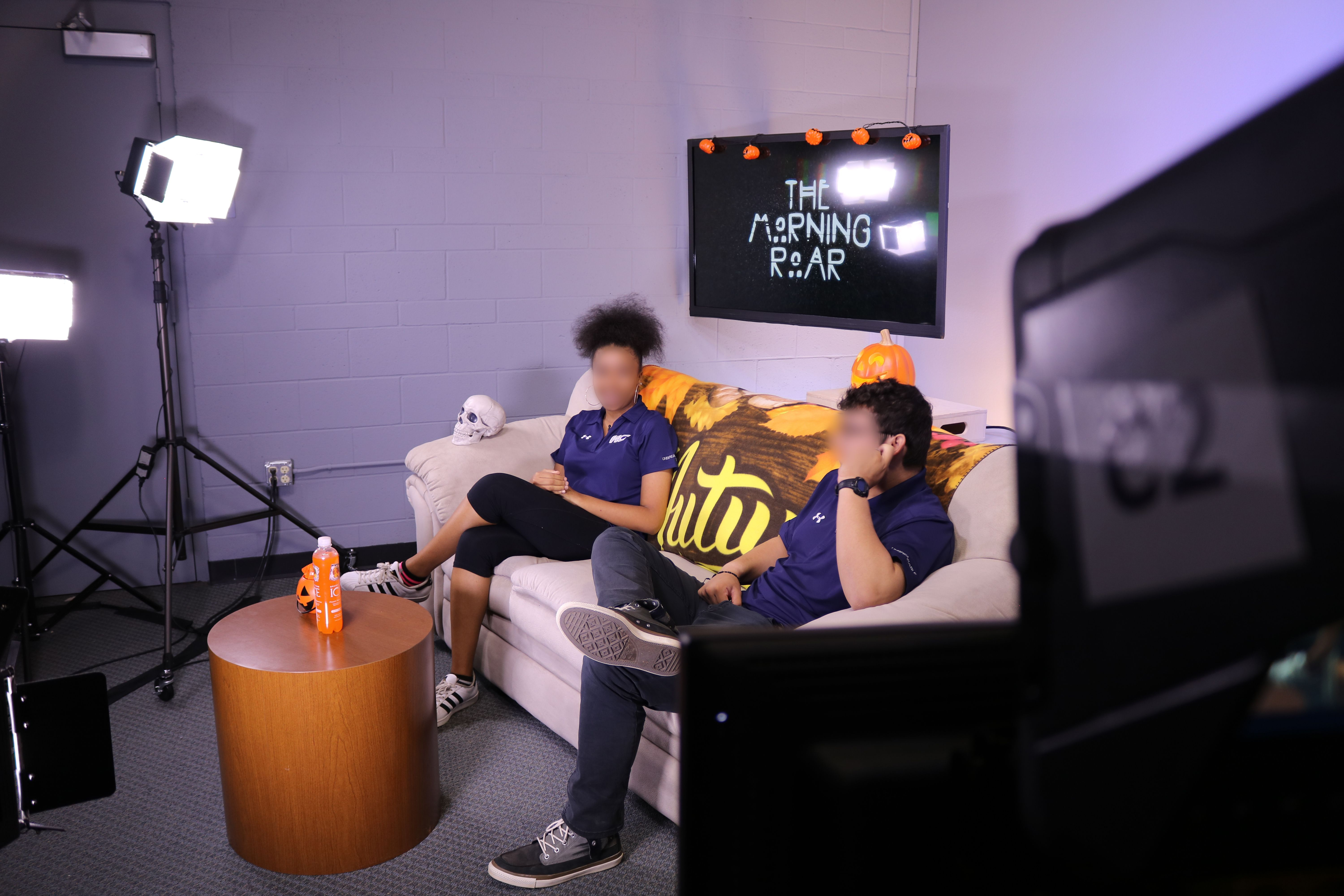
Behind the scenes of WCHS The Morning Roar.

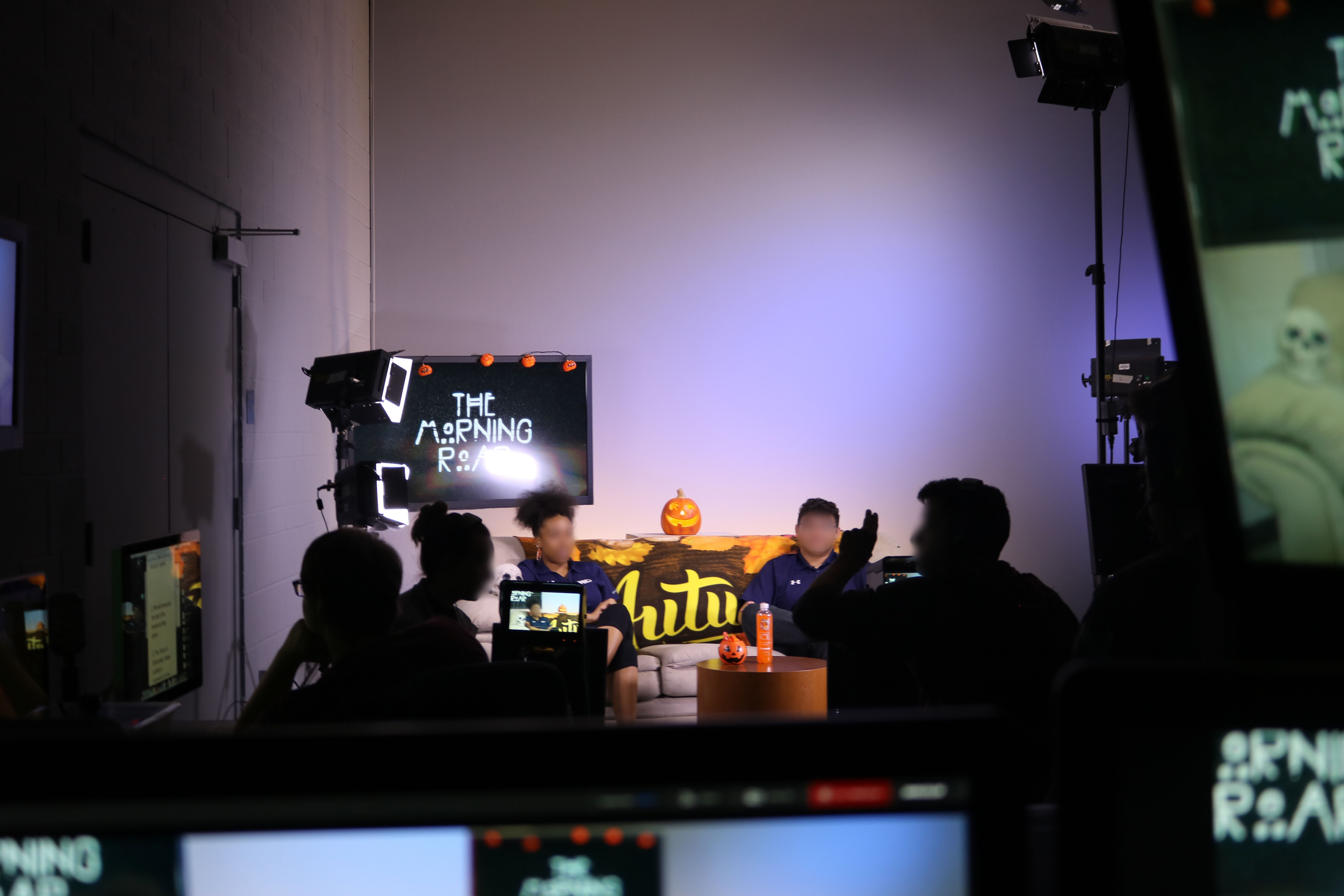
Willow Canyon HS Behind the scenes

=== Cambridge Program ===
Cambridge Program was discontinued in the 23-24 school year.

=== International Baccalaureate Program (IB) ===
Willow Canyon is certified to offer the IB Diploma and coursework. The IB Program is a demanding pre-university course of study that leads to examinations. It is designed for highly motivated secondary school students aged 16 to 19.

=== Medical Lab Assistant ===
Medical Lab Assisting is designed for students interested in any clinical-medical profession and offers hands-on experiences in the classroom lab including expertise in phlebotomy procedures, capillary punctures, urinalysis and blood smears.

== Sports teams ==
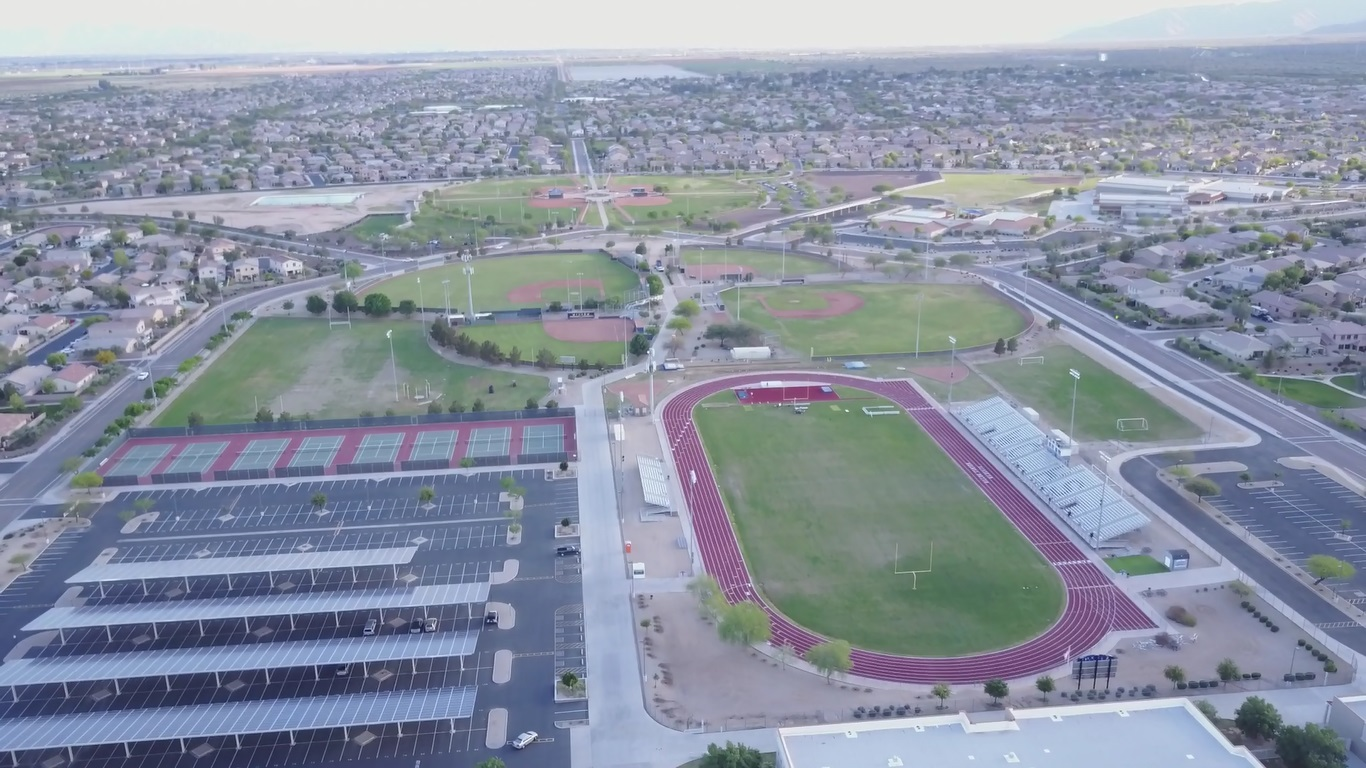
An aerial view showing all the fields used for sports.

Willow Canyon has sports teams available for boys and girls.

| Boys | Girls |
|---|---|
| Football | Basketball |
| Baseball | Cross Country |
| Track & Field | Golf |
| Basketball | Soccer |
| Cross Country | Softball |
| Golf | Track & Field |
| Soccer | Volleyball |
| Swimming | Tennis |
| Tennis | Swimming |
| Volleyball | Badminton |
| Wrestling | Wrestling |
| Marching Band | Marching Band |
| E-Sports | E-Sports |

== Notable alumni ==
- Colleen Planeta (2006), basketball player who played professionally in Luxembourg, Portugal, Greece, Germany, and Australia
- Arianna Romero (2010), professional soccer player who played internationally for the Mexico women's national football team
- Allison Veloz (2020), professional soccer player for Pachuca
