= Shadow Ridge High School =

Shadow Ridge High School may refer to:

- Shadow Ridge High School (Arizona)
- Shadow Ridge High School (Nevada)
