= Shadow Ridge High School (Arizona) =

School in Waddell–Surprise, Arizona

Coordinates: 33.583115°N 112.459020°W

Location
- 10909 N. Perryville Road; Surprise, Arizona 85388; United States

Information
- School type: Public high school
- Established: 2009
- School district: Dysart Unified School District No. 89
- Principal: Cedricia Hester
- Teaching staff: 109.60 (FTE)
- Grades: 9-12
- Enrollment: 2,339 (2023–2024)
- Student to teacher ratio: 21.34
- Colors: Maroon, Gold and Black
- Mascot: Stallion
- Website: dysart.org/srhs

Shadow Ridge High School is a high school in Surprise, Arizona under the jurisdiction of the Dysart Unified School District.

== History ==
As of the middle of the 2018–2019 school year, Shadow Ridge High School has a total faculty count of 168.

== Academics ==
The school is currently ranked a A from the Arizona Accountability System Letter Grades.

The high school is known for their signature architecture program. They have currently taken home 2 first place national titles from the SkillsUSA National Champions for Architectural Drafting. They also allow their students to engage in off-campus programs through the Western Maricopa Education Center (West-MEC)

=== Signature Programs ===
- Animation (CTE) – The Animation program introduces students to computer animation techniques using 2D computer images and 3D computer animation.
- Education Professions (CTE) – The Education Professions program is designed to prepare students for employment or post secondary opportunities in the education field.
- Engineering Sciences (CTE) – The Engineering Sciences program is designed for students to explore careers in technology, industry and engineering.
- Graphic/Web Design (CTE) – The Graphic/Web Design program is designed to prepare students to apply technical knowledge and skills in the manufacture and distribution or transmission of graphic communications products.
- Media Communications/Journalism (CTE) – The Journalism program is designed to prepare students to apply technical knowledge and professional skills in the making and producing of journalism for television and the communication of dramatic information through the writing and production of news stories across multiple print and online mediums.
- Professional Sales and Marketing (CTE) – The Profession Sales & Marketing program is designed to prepare students for employment in various sales, customer service, advertising and promotion, and first-line supervisory positions in wholesale, retail, and service establishments.
- Software Development (CTE) – The Software Development program is designed to prepare students for employment/postsecondary education related to the design, development, installation, implementation, use and management of computers with an emphasis on writing code.
- Sports Medicine and Rehabilitation (CTE) – The Sports Medicine and Rehabilitation program prepares students to perform technical services involved with planning, organizing, researching, directing and controlling functions and processes related to the provision of select healthcare services.

== Athletics ==
Boys	Girls
Baseball	Basketball
Basketball	Beach Volleyball
Cross Country	Cross Country
Football	Golf
Golf	Poms
Poms	Soccer
Soccer	Softball
Swimming	Swimming
Tennis	Tennis
Track & Field	Track & Field
Volleyball	Volleyball
Wrestling	Wrestling
