= Casino Arizona =

Casino in Scottsdale, Arizona

- Interactive map of Casino Arizona
- Location: 524 N 92nd St Scottsdale, AZ 85256; 33.453885°N 111.885493°W
- Opened: 1998
- Gaming space: 100,000 sq ft
- Architect: FFKR Architects
- Website: www.casinoarizona.com

Casino Arizona is a casino located on the Salt-River Pima Maricopa Indian Reservation in Scottsdale, Arizona. The property is 48 feet (15 meters) high. Casino Arizona is independently owned and operated by the Salt River Pima-Maricopa Indian Community (SRPMIC).

Casino Arizona covers 20 acres. The facility includes five restaurants, more than 100,000 square feet for gaming and a Showroom that seats 300.

== History ==
Casino Arizona, located at the northeast corner of McKellips Road and Loop 101, opened in 1998 as a temporary structure. Originally, a poker room, the property consisted of 47 poker table games and had 240 employees. By March 1999, the property expanded to include 250 slot machines and 180 additional employees.

That same year, Casino Arizona opened a second location, at Loop 101 & Indian Bend Road. The new facility was a temporary, sprung structure. With the additional space, poker was moved to the building on 101 & Indian Bend in August 2003.

In 2010, the sprung structure and its contents were auctioned to the public. The space would eventually become Talking Stick Resort, which opened on April 15, 2010.

In September 2000, Casino Arizona at Loop 101 and McKellips Road replaced its temporary structure with a permanent building. The property opened with a Native American art exhibit, 500 slots, 50 table games, Keno and bingo. It then had 1,200 employees.

Bingo was originally offered at Casino Arizona. It was later removed so that the space could be utilized for new games that were allotted through a 2002 gaming expansion referendum. The facility reintroduced bingo in 2012.

== Gaming ==
Casino Arizona's gaming floor occupies more than 100,000 square feet. It includes 998 slot machines, 50 tables of Blackjack, Three Card Poker, Keno, Let It Ride, Pai Gow Poker and Casino War. The property is also home to a Bingo Hall that offers seating for 1,000.

== Attractions ==
Casino Arizona has five restaurants including Cholla Prime Steakhouse & Lounge, Eagles Buffet, Willows Restaurant, Salt River Café and Arizona Room Patio Grill. The Arizona Room Patio Grill features a media wall with 24 screens displaying sporting events.

The property also maintains an extensive Native American art collection featuring culturally significant pottery, baskets and jewelry.

Casino Arizona is located 7.3 miles from Talking Stick Resort. Both are part of the Talking Stick, a Cultural & Entertainment Destination District. Surrounding companies within the District include Salt River Fields at Talking Stick, Talking Stick Resort Golf Club, the Pavilions at Talking Stick Resort and Butterfly Wonderland.

== See also ==
- List of casinos in Arizona
