= Youngtown, Arizona =

Town in Maricopa County, Arizona

- Town
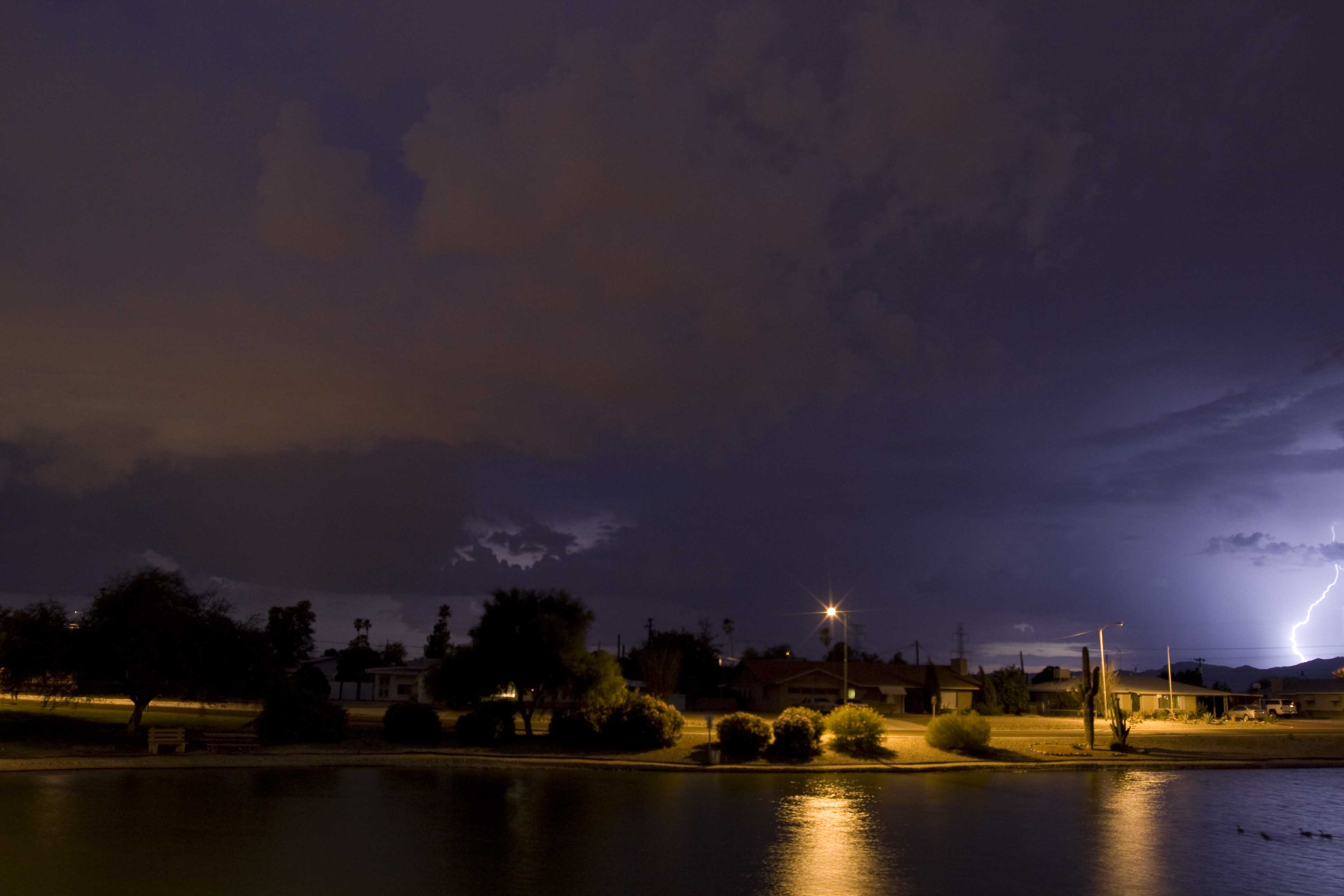
- Maricopa Lake in a thunderstorm, Youngtown

- Flag Seal
- Motto: "First in Concept – Fostering Community Pride – Building Quality of Life"
- Location in Maricopa County, Arizona

- Location within Arizona Location within the United States
- Coordinates: 33°35′04″N 112°18′17″W
- Country: United States
- State: Arizona
- County: Maricopa

Government
  - Mayor: Michael LeVault

Area
  - Total: 1.49 sq mi (3.87 km^{2})
  - Land: 1.49 sq mi (3.85 km^{2})
  - Water: 0.0077 sq mi (0.02 km^{2})
- Elevation: 1,132 ft (345 m)

Population (2020)
  - Total: 7,056
  - Density: 4,745.2/sq mi (1,832.12/km^{2})
- Time zone: UTC-7 (MST (no DST))
- ZIP code: 85363
- Area code: 623
- FIPS code: 04-85400
- GNIS feature ID: 2413523
- Website: www.youngtownaz.org

Youngtown is a town in Maricopa County, Arizona, United States. As of the 2020 census, the population of the town was 7,056, up from 6,156 in 2010. It is part of the Phoenix metropolitan area.

== History ==
In 1954, two developers bought 320 acres (1.3 km^{2}) of farmland and built the United States' first planned community dedicated exclusively to retirees. Designed by Ben Schleifer, who also had the idea of an active retirement community, the community was ironically named Youngtown. Frances Greer who owned the ranch that the development was built on. In 1955, 125 homes were built, with about 85 other lots sold.

Two years later, in 1957, Youngtown was featured in an episode of Wide Wide World. This put national attention on the area. As a result, more people began moving in, sparking a new movement for the community.

In 1959, West Valley agriculturalist Jim Boswell II withheld land from Del Webb when selling land to build Sun City. The land between Alabama and Grand avenues and west of 111th Avenue, was saved specifically to allow Youngtown to have space for further expansion. A year later in 1960, on January 1, Sun City opened just east of the development. That same year, the town of Youngtown was incorporated and the country's first AARP Chapter was established in the town.

In 1996, the town, citing its age restrictions, denied extending the stay of a 16-year-old child to live in the community. In response, Arizona attorney general Grant Woods investigated and determined that the age ordinance was unenforceable. In response, Youngtown repealed the age restrictions in 1999.

== Geography ==
Youngtown is located on the east bank of the Agua Fria River, just south of US 60. It is bordered on the west by El Mirage, on the south by Glendale, and on the east by the much larger retirement community of Sun City. Youngtown is 18 miles (29 km) northwest of downtown Phoenix.

According to the United States Census Bureau, the town has a total area of 1.5 square miles (3.9 km^{2}), of which 0.006 square miles (0.016 km^{2}), or 0.40%, are water.

=== Climate ===
Youngtown has a hot desert climate (Köppen: BWh) with long, extremely hot summers and short, mild winters.

Climate data for Youngtown, Arizona, 1991–2020 normals, extremes 1964–present
Month	Jan	Feb	Mar	Apr	May	Jun	Jul	Aug	Sep	Oct	Nov	Dec	Year
Record high °F (°C)	87 (31)	89 (32)	98 (37)	104 (40)	113 (45)	122 (50)	122 (50)	118 (48)	114 (46)	110 (43)	95 (35)	84 (29)	122 (50)
Mean maximum °F (°C)	77.8 (25.4)	81.0 (27.2)	89.8 (32.1)	98.5 (36.9)	105.3 (40.7)	112.2 (44.6)	114.4 (45.8)	112.8 (44.9)	108.4 (42.4)	99.9 (37.7)	87.6 (30.9)	76.2 (24.6)	115.5 (46.4)
Mean daily maximum °F (°C)	65.4 (18.6)	68.9 (20.5)	76.5 (24.7)	84.1 (28.9)	92.9 (33.8)	102.2 (39.0)	104.9 (40.5)	103.6 (39.8)	98.4 (36.9)	87.0 (30.6)	73.9 (23.3)	63.8 (17.7)	85.1 (29.5)
Daily mean °F (°C)	53.3 (11.8)	56.4 (13.6)	62.7 (17.1)	69.5 (20.8)	78.3 (25.7)	87.2 (30.7)	92.3 (33.5)	91.4 (33.0)	85.4 (29.7)	73.2 (22.9)	60.8 (16.0)	52.0 (11.1)	71.9 (22.2)
Mean daily minimum °F (°C)	41.1 (5.1)	43.8 (6.6)	48.9 (9.4)	54.8 (12.7)	63.6 (17.6)	72.2 (22.3)	79.7 (26.5)	79.2 (26.2)	72.5 (22.5)	59.5 (15.3)	47.7 (8.7)	40.2 (4.6)	58.6 (14.8)
Mean minimum °F (°C)	32.1 (0.1)	35.5 (1.9)	40.4 (4.7)	46.1 (7.8)	53.9 (12.2)	64.0 (17.8)	71.5 (21.9)	71.4 (21.9)	63.1 (17.3)	49.3 (9.6)	37.4 (3.0)	30.8 (−0.7)	29.4 (−1.4)
Record low °F (°C)	20 (−7)	24 (−4)	24 (−4)	32 (0)	38 (3)	51 (11)	62 (17)	54 (12)	48 (9)	35 (2)	28 (−2)	21 (−6)	20 (−7)
Average precipitation inches (mm)	0.98 (25)	1.25 (32)	1.03 (26)	0.29 (7.4)	0.11 (2.8)	0.03 (0.76)	0.84 (21)	0.97 (25)	0.74 (19)	0.59 (15)	0.61 (15)	0.90 (23)	8.34 (212)
Average precipitation days	3.5	4.0	3.5	1.5	1.0	0.4	2.9	3.7	2.4	2.2	1.9	3.8	30.8
Source: NOAA

== Demographics ==
Historical population
Census	Pop.	Note	%±
1970	1,886		—
1980	2,254		19.5%
1990	2,542		12.8%
2000	3,010		18.4%
2010	6,156		104.5%
2020	7,056		14.6%
2022 (est.)	7,007	▼	−0.7%
U.S. Decennial Census

=== 2020 census ===
As of the 2020 census, Youngtown had a population of 7,056. The median age was 37.2 years. 25.5% of residents were under the age of 18 and 18.7% of residents were 65 years of age or older. For every 100 females there were 91.4 males, and for every 100 females age 18 and over there were 86.8 males age 18 and over.

100.0% of residents lived in urban areas, while 0.0% lived in rural areas.

There were 2,605 households in Youngtown, of which 35.1% had children under the age of 18 living in them. Of all households, 35.9% were married-couple households, 20.9% were households with a male householder and no spouse or partner present, and 34.2% were households with a female householder and no spouse or partner present. About 33.7% of all households were made up of individuals and 20.0% had someone living alone who was 65 years of age or older.

There were 2,724 housing units, of which 4.4% were vacant. The homeowner vacancy rate was 2.9% and the rental vacancy rate was 3.6%.

Racial composition as of the 2020 census
Race	Number	Percent
White	4,079	57.8%
Black or African American	307	4.4%
American Indian and Alaska Native	147	2.1%
Asian	198	2.8%
Native Hawaiian and Other Pacific Islander	5	0.1%
Some other race	1,085	15.4%
Two or more races	1,235	17.5%
Hispanic or Latino (of any race)	2,800	39.7%

=== 2000 census ===
At the 2000 census, there were 3,010 people, 1,641 households, and 746 families living in the town. The population density was 2,296.1 inhabitants per square mile (886.5/km^{2}). There were 1,783 housing units at an average density of 1,360.1 per square mile (525.1/km^{2}). The racial makeup of the town was 88.90% White, 1.36% Black or African American, 0.50% Native American, 0.60% Asian, 0.27% Pacific Islander, 7.24% from other races, and 1.13% from two or more races. 12.72% of the population were Hispanic or Latino of any race.

Of the 1,641 households, 7.7% had children under the age of 18 living with them, 35.5% were married couples living together, 8.0% had a female householder with no husband present, and 54.5% were non-families. 50.3% of households were one person and 36.6% were one person aged 65 or older. The average household size was 1.74 and the average family size was 2.48.

The age distribution was 9.9% under the age of 18, 3.5% from 18 to 24, 12.8% from 25 to 44, 23.4% from 45 to 64, and 50.4% 65 or older. The median age was 65 years. For every 100 females, there were 70.1 males. For every 100 females age 18 and over, there were 66.6 males.

The median household income was $23,164 and the median family income was $29,329. Males had a median income of $30,000 versus $22,500 for females. The per capita income for the town was $16,749. About 9.6% of families and 13.1% of the population were below the poverty line, including 33.1% of those under age 18 and 8.5% of those age 65 or over.

== Economy ==
=== Top employers ===
Top employers in the city of Youngtown as of 2022.

#	Employer	# of Employees
1	Lifestream Senior Living	180
2	Sunview Health and Rehab	100
3	Ventura Winds Retirement Home	60
4	Ace Hardware	40
5	Motel 6	40
6	Desert Golf Carts	30
7	Water Heaters Only	30
8	Albrecht & Son Painters	30
9	Jack in the Box	30
10	General Exterminating	30

== Education ==
Youngtown is served by the Peoria Unified School District and the Dysart Unified School District.

== Transportation ==
Youngtown is a member of Valley Metro, the regional transportation agency. Valley Metro Bus route 106 serves the east border of Youngtown on 111th Avenue.
