= Western Maricopa Education Center =

JTED school district in the West Valley of Phoenix, Arizona

Location
- 5487 N. 99th Ave. Glendale, Arizona 85305 United States
- Coordinates: 33.5151°N 112.2718°W

Other information
- Website: west-mec.edu

The Western Maricopa Education Center (West-MEC) is a joint technological education district based in Maricopa County, Arizona, United States. It provides career and technical education services to ten school districts in the West Valley of Phoenix.

== Member school districts ==
West-MEC had partnered with 15 public school districts and 2 charter districts to deliver a variety of specialized career and technical education programs for students in those districts.

- Agua Fria Union High School District
- Buckeye Union High School District
- Cartwright Elementary School District
- Deer Valley Unified School District
- Dysart Unified School District
- Gila Bend Unified School District
- Glendale Union High School District
- Littleton Elementary School District
- Nadaburg Unified School District
- Paradise Honors High School
- Paradise Valley Unified School District
- Pendergast Elementary School District
- Peoria Unified School District
- Ridgeline Academy
- Saddle Mountain Unified School District
- Tolleson Union High School District
- Wickenburg Unified School District
