= El Mirage, Arizona =

City in Maricopa County, Arizona

- City
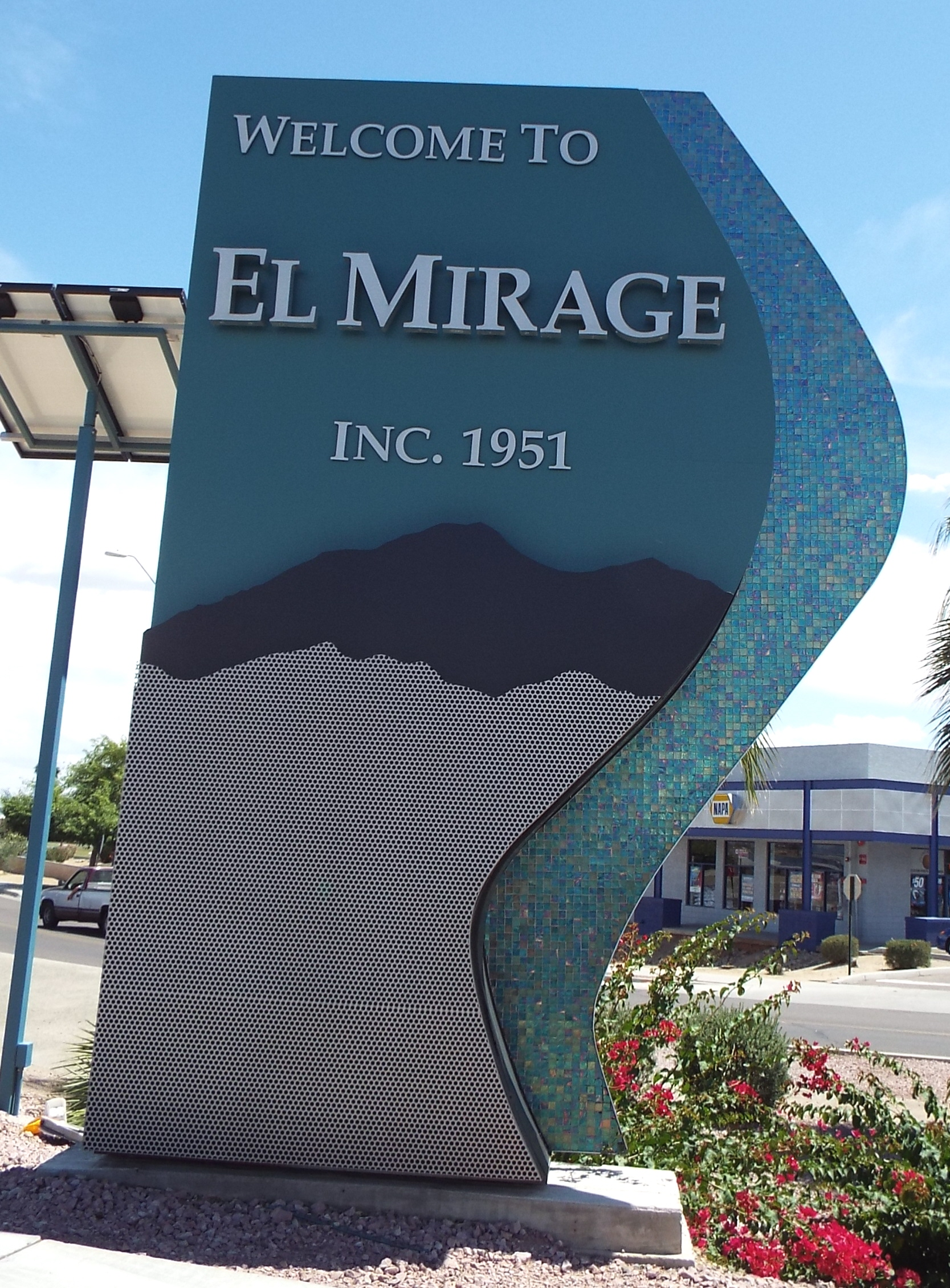
- Entrance to the city of El Mirage

- Flag Seal

- Location in Maricopa County, Arizona

- Location in Arizona El Mirage (the United States)
- Coordinates: 33°36′47″N 112°19′28″W
- Country: United States
- State: Arizona
- County: Maricopa
- Established: 1951

Government
  - Council/Manager: Alexis Hermosillo

Area
  - Total: 9.95 sq mi (25.78 km^{2})
  - Land: 9.90 sq mi (25.63 km^{2})
  - Water: 0.058 sq mi (0.15 km^{2})
- Elevation: 1,283 ft (391 m)

Population (2020)
  - Total: 35,805
  - Density: 3,617.5/sq mi (1,396.72/km^{2})
- Time zone: UTC-7 (MST (no DST))
- ZIP code: 85335
- Area code: 623
- FIPS code: 04-22220
- GNIS feature ID: 24845
- Website: elmirageaz.gov

El Mirage is a city in Maricopa County, Arizona, United States. As of the 2020 census, the population of the city was 35,805, up from 31,797 in 2010.

== History ==
The Hohokam Native American tribe were the earliest inhabitants of the area that is now El Mirage. The ingenious Hohokam developed an elaborate irrigation network using only stone instruments and organized labor. They were commonly known as the "Canal Builders".

During the early 1930s, migrant farm workers settled in El Mirage on the west bank of the Agua Fria River. Mexican migrants came to El Mirage to help build the canals and harvest the first crops. Farming and agriculture remain central to El Mirage's economy, but it has witnessed a robust industrial growth over the past few decades, emerging as a diverse urban community.

In 1977, the city annexed 2,000 acres of land for a proposed planned community with apartments, shopping centers, and industrial development. Immediately following this announcement Attorney General Bruce Babbitt, sued in an attempt to undo this annexation due to its proximity to Luke Air Force Base. The lawsuit failed, but prompted the cities of Glendale and Goodyear to work together to buy land surrounding the base to stop any further annexations.

In the early eighties, El Mirage announced its plans for economic redevelopment. The city planned to build more housing but the centerpiece of the plan was a $20 million resort and convention center, along with a golf course. A spring training baseball stadium, medical center, and auto mall were also pitched for the area. The proposed redevelopment sat, however, only five miles north from the Air Force base's runway. Once again officials from Luke Air Force Base and other government officials began to raise concerns and turn public opinion against the project. City officials travelled to Washington D.C. to fight the land use disputes, arguing that the base had known about the land acquisitions leading to the redevelopment plans and could have raised concerns before it spent the money purchasing land and making deals with companies. Ultimately, nothing would be built on the land largely due to the concerns from Luke AFB. As a result of all of this, in 2009 when Luke Air Force Base was bidding to get the new F-35 fighter jets, El Mirage was an outlier among local cities. While many cities stood behind the Air Force base's bid wanting to keep the base operational, El Mirage voiced its opinion against the facility. The city believed that the base had hurt its financial potential and would continue doing so.

The city became an incorporated town on June 25, 1951. The city held a special election to become a city in 1983, and has continued to grow since.

== Geography ==
El Mirage is located along the Agua Fria River and U.S. Route 60 within the northwestern part of the Phoenix metropolitan area. It is bordered to the east by Youngtown, to the south by Glendale, to the northwest by Surprise, and to the northeast by unincorporated Sun City. Downtown Phoenix is 19 miles (31 km) to the southeast via US 60.

According to the United States Census Bureau, the city has a total area of 9.95 square miles (25.8 km^{2}), of which 0.06 square miles (0.16 km^{2}), or 0.56%, are water.

=== Climate ===
Climate data for Youngtown, Arizona, 1991–2020 normals, extremes 1964–present
Month	Jan	Feb	Mar	Apr	May	Jun	Jul	Aug	Sep	Oct	Nov	Dec	Year
Record high °F (°C)	87 (31)	89 (32)	98 (37)	104 (40)	113 (45)	122 (50)	122 (50)	116 (47)	114 (46)	108 (42)	95 (35)	84 (29)	122 (50)
Mean maximum °F (°C)	77.8 (25.4)	81.0 (27.2)	89.8 (32.1)	98.5 (36.9)	105.3 (40.7)	112.2 (44.6)	114.4 (45.8)	112.8 (44.9)	108.4 (42.4)	99.9 (37.7)	87.6 (30.9)	76.2 (24.6)	115.5 (46.4)
Mean daily maximum °F (°C)	65.4 (18.6)	68.9 (20.5)	76.5 (24.7)	84.1 (28.9)	92.9 (33.8)	102.2 (39.0)	104.9 (40.5)	103.6 (39.8)	98.4 (36.9)	87.0 (30.6)	73.9 (23.3)	63.8 (17.7)	85.1 (29.5)
Daily mean °F (°C)	53.3 (11.8)	56.4 (13.6)	62.7 (17.1)	69.5 (20.8)	78.3 (25.7)	87.2 (30.7)	92.3 (33.5)	91.4 (33.0)	85.4 (29.7)	73.2 (22.9)	60.8 (16.0)	52.0 (11.1)	71.9 (22.2)
Mean daily minimum °F (°C)	41.1 (5.1)	43.8 (6.6)	48.9 (9.4)	54.8 (12.7)	63.6 (17.6)	72.2 (22.3)	79.7 (26.5)	79.2 (26.2)	72.5 (22.5)	59.5 (15.3)	47.7 (8.7)	40.2 (4.6)	58.6 (14.8)
Mean minimum °F (°C)	32.1 (0.1)	35.5 (1.9)	40.4 (4.7)	46.1 (7.8)	53.9 (12.2)	64.0 (17.8)	71.5 (21.9)	71.4 (21.9)	63.1 (17.3)	49.3 (9.6)	37.4 (3.0)	30.8 (−0.7)	29.4 (−1.4)
Record low °F (°C)	20 (−7)	24 (−4)	24 (−4)	32 (0)	38 (3)	51 (11)	62 (17)	54 (12)	48 (9)	35 (2)	28 (−2)	21 (−6)	20 (−7)
Average precipitation inches (mm)	0.98 (25)	1.25 (32)	1.03 (26)	0.29 (7.4)	0.11 (2.8)	0.03 (0.76)	0.84 (21)	0.97 (25)	0.74 (19)	0.59 (15)	0.61 (15)	0.90 (23)	8.34 (212)
Average precipitation days	3.5	4.0	3.5	1.5	1.0	0.4	2.9	3.7	2.4	2.2	1.9	3.8	30.8
Source: NOAA

== Demographics ==
Historical population
Census	Pop.	Note	%±
1960	1,723		—
1970	3,258		89.1%
1980	4,307		32.2%
1990	5,001		16.1%
2000	7,609		52.1%
2010	31,797		317.9%
2020	35,805		12.6%
U.S. Decennial Census

=== Racial and ethnic composition ===
El Mirage city, Arizona – Racial composition Note: the US Census treats Hispanic/Latino as an ethnic category. This table excludes Latinos from the racial categories and assigns them to a separate category. Hispanics/Latinos may be of any race.
Race (NH = Non-Hispanic)	2020	2010	2000	1990	1980	
White alone (NH)	36.2% (12,978)	41.4% (13,163)	27.6% (2,097)	18.3% (917)	14.8% (639)	
Black alone (NH)	6.7% (2,406)	6.1% (1,926)	3.2% (246)	2.2% (112)	5.1% (221)	
American Indian alone (NH)	1% (366)	1% (310)	0.6% (49)	0.2% (8)	0% (0)	
Asian alone (NH)	1.8% (652)	1.5% (464)	0.4% (27)		|0.1% (3)	|0% (0)
Pacific Islander alone (NH)	0.4% (133)	0.2% (74)	0.1% (4)		|0.1% (3)	|0% (0)
Other race alone (NH)	0.4% (156)	0.1% (26)	0% (2)	0.3% (13)	0.1% (6)	
Multiracial (NH)	4% (1,448)	2.2% (714)	1.3% (100)	—	—	
Hispanic/Latino (any race)	49.3% (17,666)	47.6% (15,120)	66.8% (5,084)	78.9% (3,948)	79.9% (3,441)	

=== 2020 census ===
As of the 2020 census, El Mirage had a population of 35,805. The median age was 30.3 years. 31.2% of residents were under the age of 18 and 9.8% of residents were 65 years of age or older. For every 100 females there were 97.8 males, and for every 100 females age 18 and over there were 94.5 males age 18 and over.

99.9% of residents lived in urban areas, while 0.1% lived in rural areas.

There were 10,551 households in El Mirage, of which 51.0% had children under the age of 18 living in them. Of all households, 48.1% were married-couple households, 16.4% were households with a male householder and no spouse or partner present, and 24.9% were households with a female householder and no spouse or partner present. About 14.0% of all households were made up of individuals and 5.6% had someone living alone who was 65 years of age or older.

There were 11,481 housing units, of which 8.1% were vacant. The homeowner vacancy rate was 0.9% and the rental vacancy rate was 4.1%.

Racial composition as of the 2020 census
Race	Number	Percent
White	16,962	47.4%
Black or African American	2,637	7.4%
American Indian and Alaska Native	707	2.0%
Asian	717	2.0%
Native Hawaiian and Other Pacific Islander	148	0.4%
Some other race	7,867	22.0%
Two or more races	6,767	18.9%
Hispanic or Latino (of any race)	17,666	49.3%

=== 2000 census ===
At the 2000 census, there were 7,609 people in 2,121 households, including 1,737 families, in the city. The population density was 786.8 inhabitants per square mile (303.8/km^{2}). There were 3,162 housing units at an average density of 326.9 per square mile (126.2/km^{2}). The racial makeup of the city was 66.3% White, 3.3% Black or African American, 0.9% Native American, 0.4% Asian, 0.1% Pacific Islander, 26.2% from other races, and 3.0% from two or more races. 66.8% of the population were Hispanic or Latino of any race.

Of the 2,121 households 48.8% had children under the age of 18 living with them, 55.3% were married couples living together, 17.7% had a female householder with no husband present, and 18.1% were non-families. 13.0% of households were one person and 3.7% were one person aged 65 or older. The average household size was 3.59 and the average family size was 3.87.

The age distribution was 36.8% under the age of 18, 14.1% from 18 to 24, 28.6% from 25 to 44, 13.8% from 45 to 64, and 6.6% 65 or older. The median age was 25 years. For every 100 females, there were 105.5 males. For every 100 females age 18 and over, there were 105.0 males.

The median household income was $33,813 and the median family income was $33,468. Males had a median income of $25,176 versus $19,192 for females. The per capita income for the city was $10,342. About 12.6% of families and 15.9% of the population were below the poverty line, including 14.2% of those under age 18 and 22.0% of those age 65 or over.

El Mirage is near Luke U.S. Air Force Base, the largest Fighter Pilot Training Base in the North Atlantic Treaty Organization (NATO).

== Education ==
El Mirage's roughly 5,500 preK - 12th grade students are served by the Dysart Unified School District.

Public Elementary Schools

- El Mirage Elementary - opened 1958
- Surprise Elementary- opened 1976
- Thompson Ranch Elementary - opened 2004
- Riverview Elementary - opened 2008
- Dysart Middle School - opened 2021

Public High Schools

- Dysart High School - opened 1963
- Sundown Mountain - opened 2004, alternative school for only 11th and 12th grades
- Valley Vista High School - opened 2006, although not located in El Mirage, El Mirage residents north of Waddell Rd./Thunderbird Rd. are zoned for Valley Vista.

El Mirage also has various private schools. Desert Choice School, a school design specifically for special education, Sun Valley Christian School, and Valley Learning Center, a pre-school and daycare.

== Historic structures of El Mirage ==
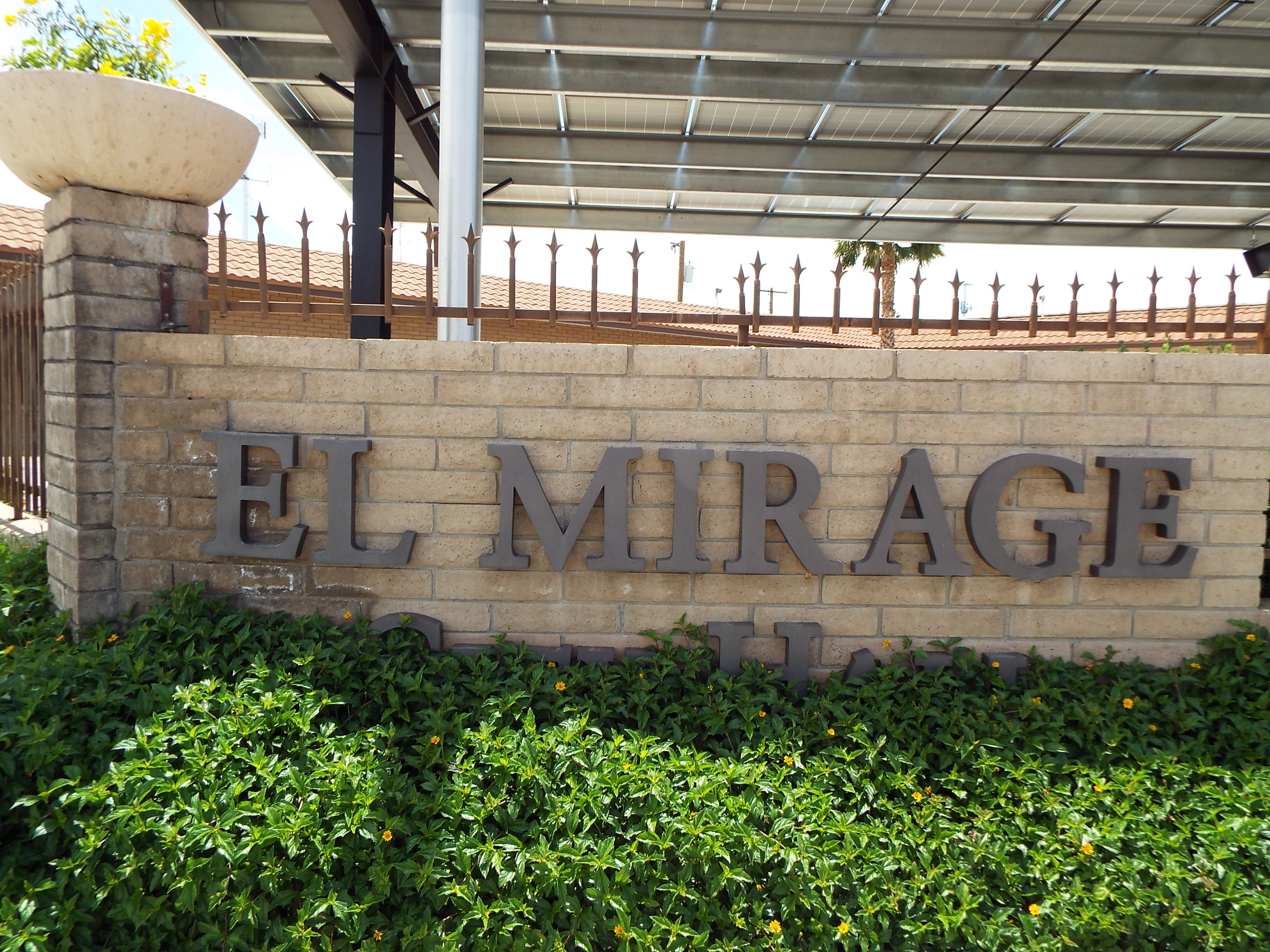
Front of the former city hall building.

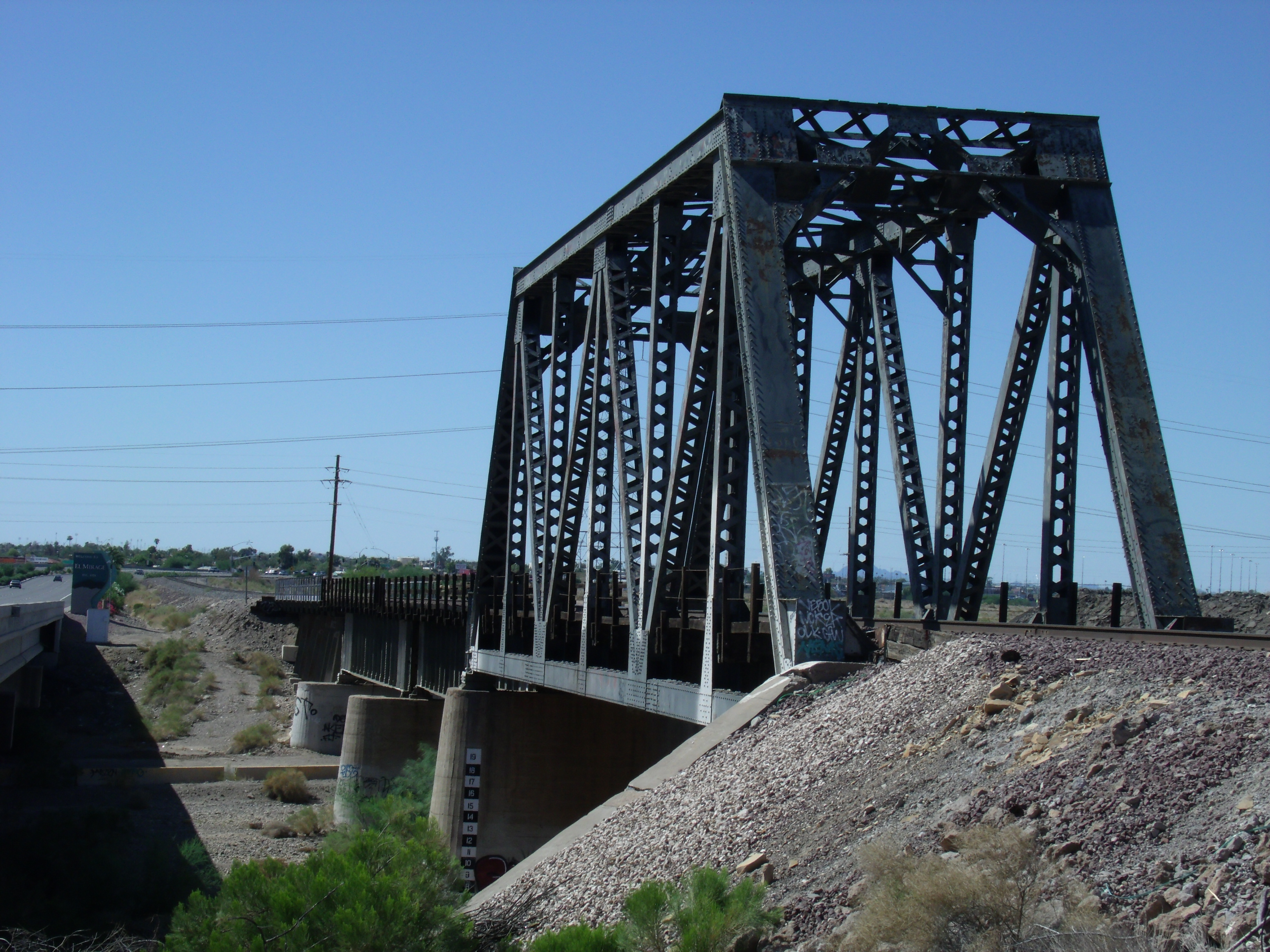
Historic El Mirage Agua Fria River Bridge built in 1895.

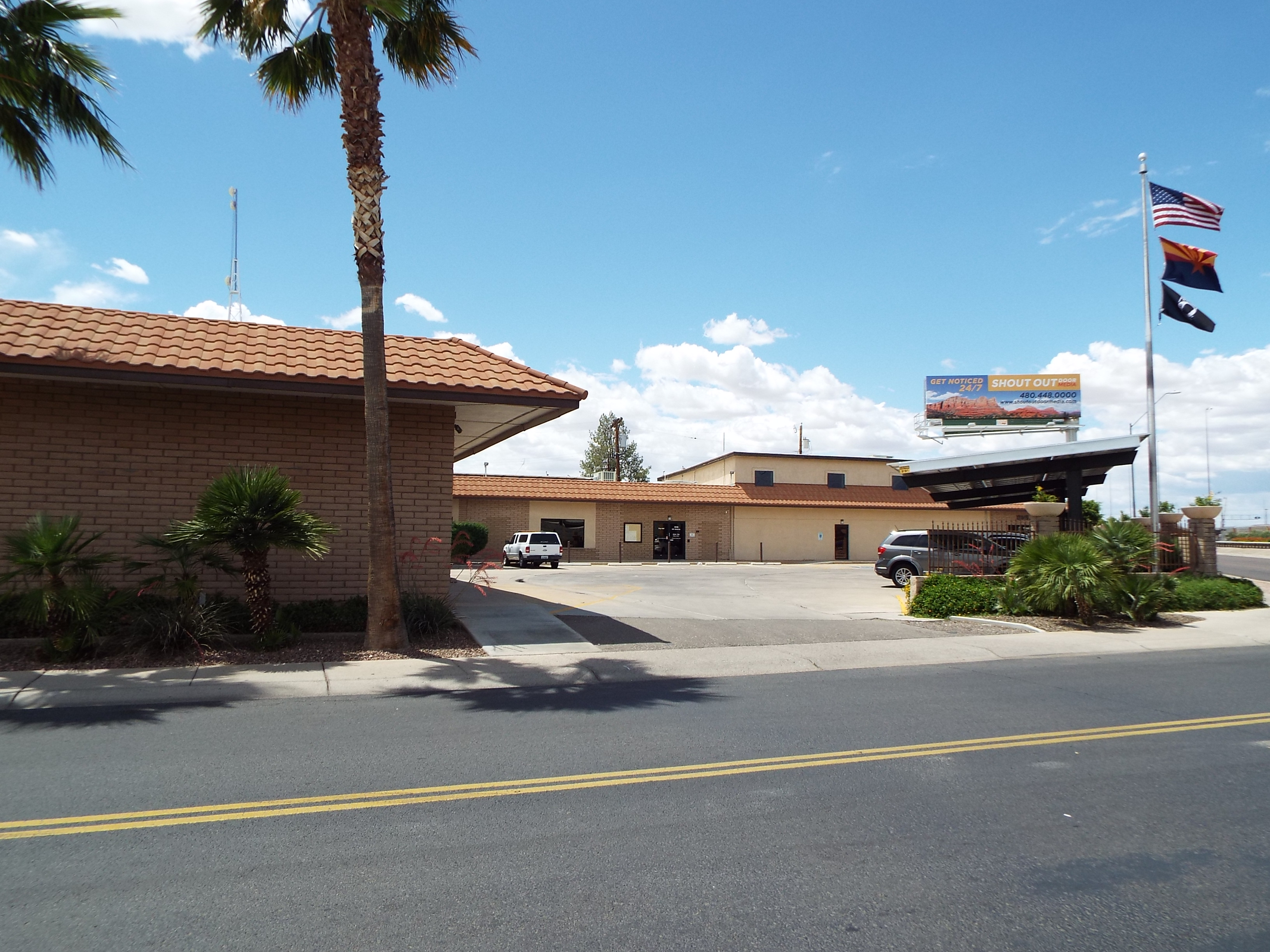
Former El Mirage City Hall located at 12145 NW Grand Ave.

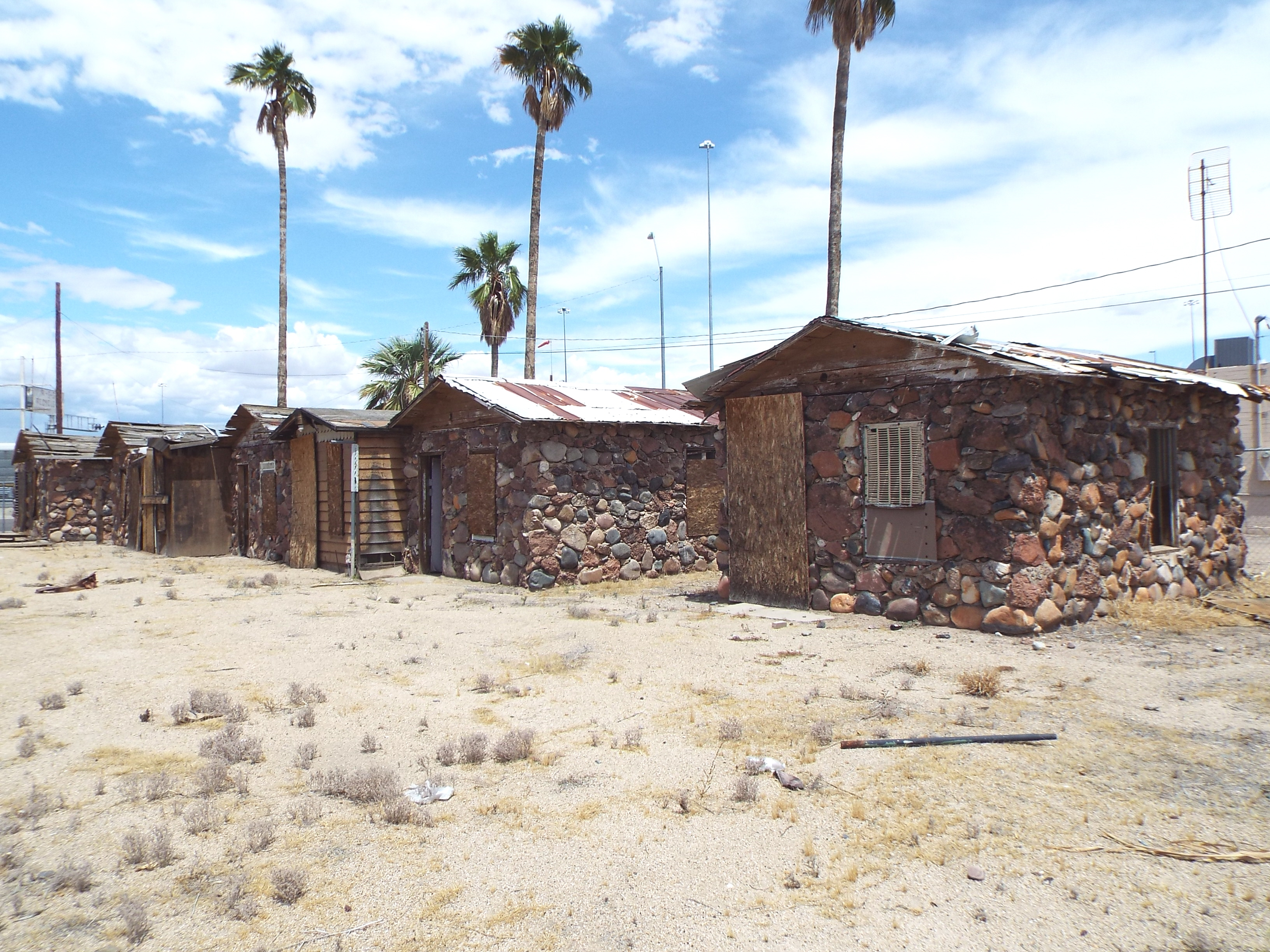
El Mirage Motel. These are the individual rooms of the motel which were used by motorist who traveled through Grand Ave.

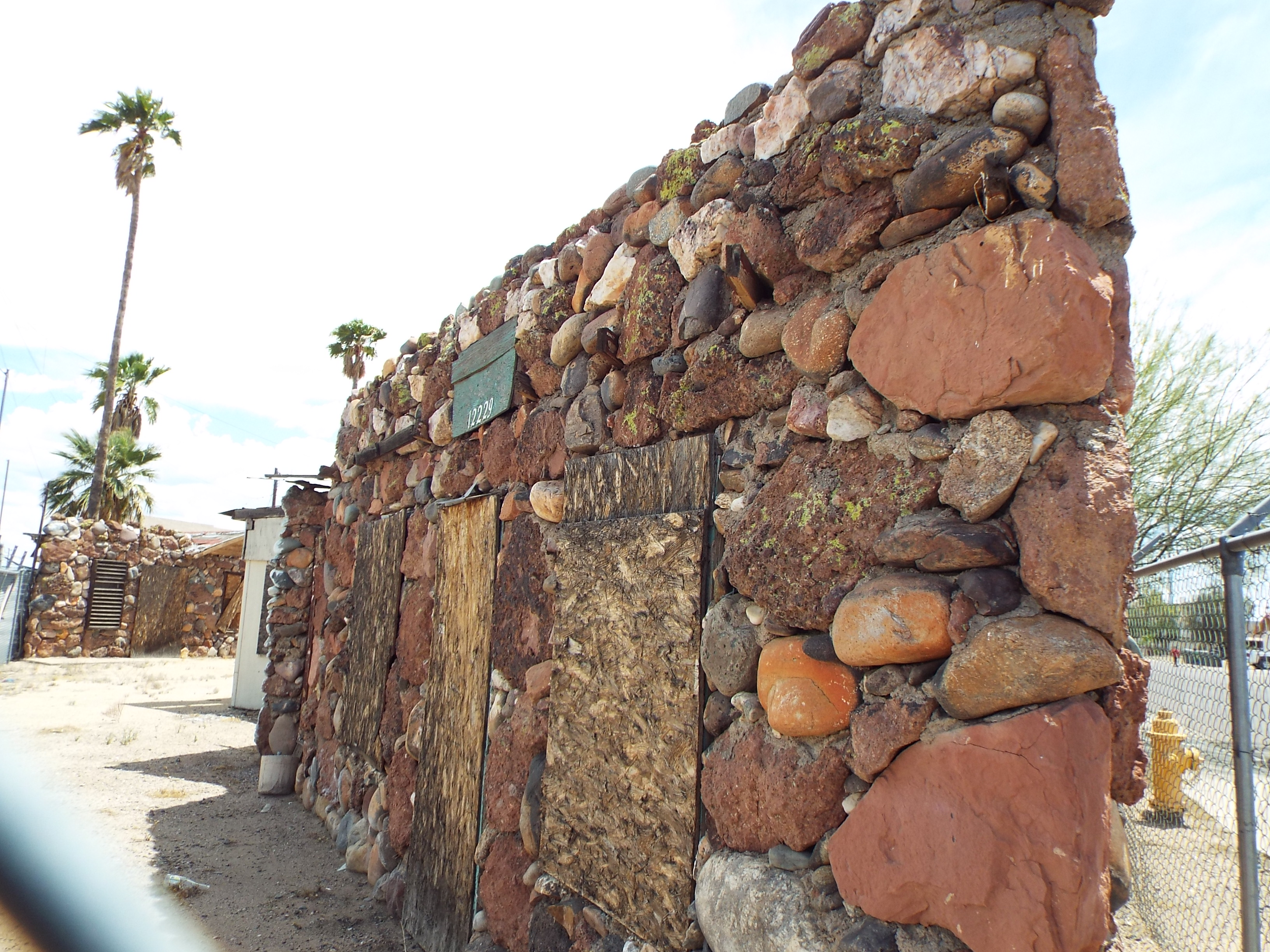
El Mirage Motel was built out of fieldstone in 1937 and is located at 12229 NW Grand Ave. The property has now been demolished.
