= Desert Diamond Casinos =

Casinos in Arizona

- Company type: Private
- Founded: 1993; 33 years ago
- Founder: Tohono O'odham Nation
- Headquarters: Tucson, Arizona, U.S.
- Area served: Central and Southern Arizona
- Key people: Mike Bean (CEO)
- Products: Casinos; Hotels; Entertainment; Resorts
- Revenue: $390.7 million (2019)
- Number of employees: 2,900
- Website: www.ddcaz.com

Desert Diamond Casinos are owned and operated by the Tohono Oʼodham Nation within the borders of the U.S. state of Arizona.

Desert Diamond Casinos currently operates in four locations in Arizona: Tucson, Sahuarita, Why, and West Valley (Glendale). The newest location, White Tanks (near Waddell, Arizona), opened December 18, 2024.

== History ==
While trying to construct the West Valley location, the Tohono O’odham Nation came into conflict with the government of Arizona. The Nation wanted to build a Class lll gaming facility, which would include table games, but the state opposed this. The Nation went to court to get the state to follow the law, which states that gambling is permitted on Indian reservations through compacts signed between the state and tribes.

The West Valley casino opened in 2015 but the state denied it a Class III license, only granting a Class II license. The casino instead offers bingo-style slot machines but no card tables and no state license to serve alcohol.

In May of 2017, the state of Arizona and the Tohono O'odham Nation settled the lawsuit. The terms of the settlement allow the tribe to operate full-fledged gambling and sell alcohol at its casino in Glendale but bar it from opening more gambling operations in the Valley.

In April 2023, the fifth casino broke ground with officials and members of the Tohono O’odham Nation, the tribe that owns the casino, present. Surrounding city officials from Glendale, Peoria, Buckeye, Tolleson, Surprise, and El Mirage also took part in the groundbreaking ceremony. The new White Tanks casino, total area of 184,000-square-feet, opened December 2024.
