= Dysart High School =

Coordinates: 33.587465°N 112.341809°W

- Aerial photo of Dysart High School.

Location
- 11425 North Dysart Road; El Mirage, Arizona 85335; United States

Information
- School type: Public high school
- Established: 1963
- School district: Dysart Unified School District No. 89
- Principal: Amy Hartjen
- Teaching staff: 65.00 (FTE)
- Grades: 9-12
- Enrollment: 1,447 (2023-2024)
- Student to teacher ratio: 22.26
- Colors: Red, White and Black
- Mascot: Demon
- Website: www.dysart.org/mainsite/schools/dysart-high-school

Dysart High School is a high school in El Mirage, Arizona under the jurisdiction of the Dysart Unified School District.

== History ==
Dysart High School is the only 9-12 high school in the city of El Mirage.

The school's population is 60% Hispanic, 24% White, 8% Black, 5% two or more races, 2% Asian, 1% Native American, and < 1% Pacific Islander.

As of the 2021-2022 school year, Dysart High School had 1,467 students enrolled. The total faculty of the school is 98 (71 teachers, 15 teachers aides, 4 administrators, and 9 professional staff).

== Academics ==
The school has been designated by the Arizona Learns Achievement Profile as "Performing Plus".

The school has a graduation rate of 97% and awards over $700,000 in scholarships annually. In addition the school received over $600,000 in a 21st Century Grant and nearly $100,000 in a Gear-up grant; this money is used to fund mentoring, tutoring, summer enrichment and parental involvement programs.
