= Dysart Unified School District =

School district in Arizona, United States

Dysart Schools

Location
- 15802 N Parkview Place, Surprise, AZ 85374 Arizona United States

District information
- Type: Public
- Motto: Power in the preparation... Excellence in the journey... Success for a lifetime
- Grades: Pre K-12
- Established: 1920
- Superintendent: Dr. John Croteau
- Schools: 26
- Budget: $177.7 million

Students and staff
- Students: 24,000
- Staff: 2,800

Other information
- Website: dysart.org

Dysart Schools is a school district in Maricopa County, Arizona. It has 24,000 pre-kindergarten through 12th grade students in the Northwest Phoenix Metropolitan area. The district encompasses 140 square miles (360 km^{2}), serving all of El Mirage, almost all of Surprise, parts of Glendale and Youngtown, and portions of unincorporated Maricopa County. The district is home to twenty K-8 schools, four comprehensive high schools, and one alternative program. The district has AdvancED Accreditation, the NCA Model School District Award, NSBA Technology Spotlight Award, and is home to a national elementary school principal of the year and two Arizona teachers of the year.

== History ==
The district was founded by Nathaniel Martin Dysart in 1920. He sold his land and created the governing board so that his daughter did not have to walk 5 miles to the nearest school.

Dysart initially established a one-room schoolhouse with fewer than 10 students, serving first through eighth grades. By 1937, enrollment increased to more than 200, however, the district only had seven teachers.

By the late 1950s, Dysart was home to three elementary schools, and added its first high school, Dysart High School, in 1962. In 1977, Dysart officially consolidated into a K-12 unified district.

Prior to 2001, the district had only five elementary schools, and one high school. However, due to the exponential growth of Surprise and El Mirage, the district became one of the fastest growing districts in Arizona. In the 2000s, the district built at least one school per year and by the end of the 2000s, the district had a total of twenty-four schools.

The school district had a major rebrand on July 7 of 2022, changing the name to Dysart Schools. Previously, the district was known as the Dysart Unified School District.

== Schools ==
Starting in the 2021-2022 school year, Dysart remade eight of their existing schools into middle and elementary schools for 5th-8th, and K-4th grade.

=== Preschools ===
- Growing Minds

=== K-4 schools ===
- Countryside Elementary School - (Surprise)
- El Mirage Elementary School - (El Mirage)
- Rancho Gabriela Elementary School - (Surprise)

=== K-5 School ===
- Asante Preparatory Academy (Formerly Desert Moon School) - (Surprise)
- Western Peaks Elementary School - (Surprise)

=== 5-8 schools ===
- Ashton Ranch Middle School - (Surprise)
- Dysart Middle School - (El Mirage)
- Sonoran Heights Elementary / Middle School - (Surprise)

=== 6-8 schools ===
- Cimarron Springs Middle School - (Surprise) (It was formerly Cimarron Springs Elementary School)

=== K-8 schools ===
- Canyon Ridge School - (Surprise)
- Freedom Traditional Academy - (Surprise)
- Kingswood Elementary School - (Surprise)
- Luke Elementary School - (Glendale)
- Marley Park Elementary School - (Surprise)
- Mountain View School - (Waddell)
- Riverview Elementary School - (El Mirage)
- Sunset Hills Elementary School - (Surprise)
- Surprise Elementary School - (El Mirage)
- Thompson Ranch Elementary School - (El Mirage)
- West Point Elementary School - (Surprise)

=== High schools ===
- Dysart High School - (El Mirage)
- Shadow Ridge High School - (Surprise)
- Valley Vista High School (Arizona) - (Surprise)
- Willow Canyon High School - (Surprise)
