= Valley Vista High School (Arizona) =

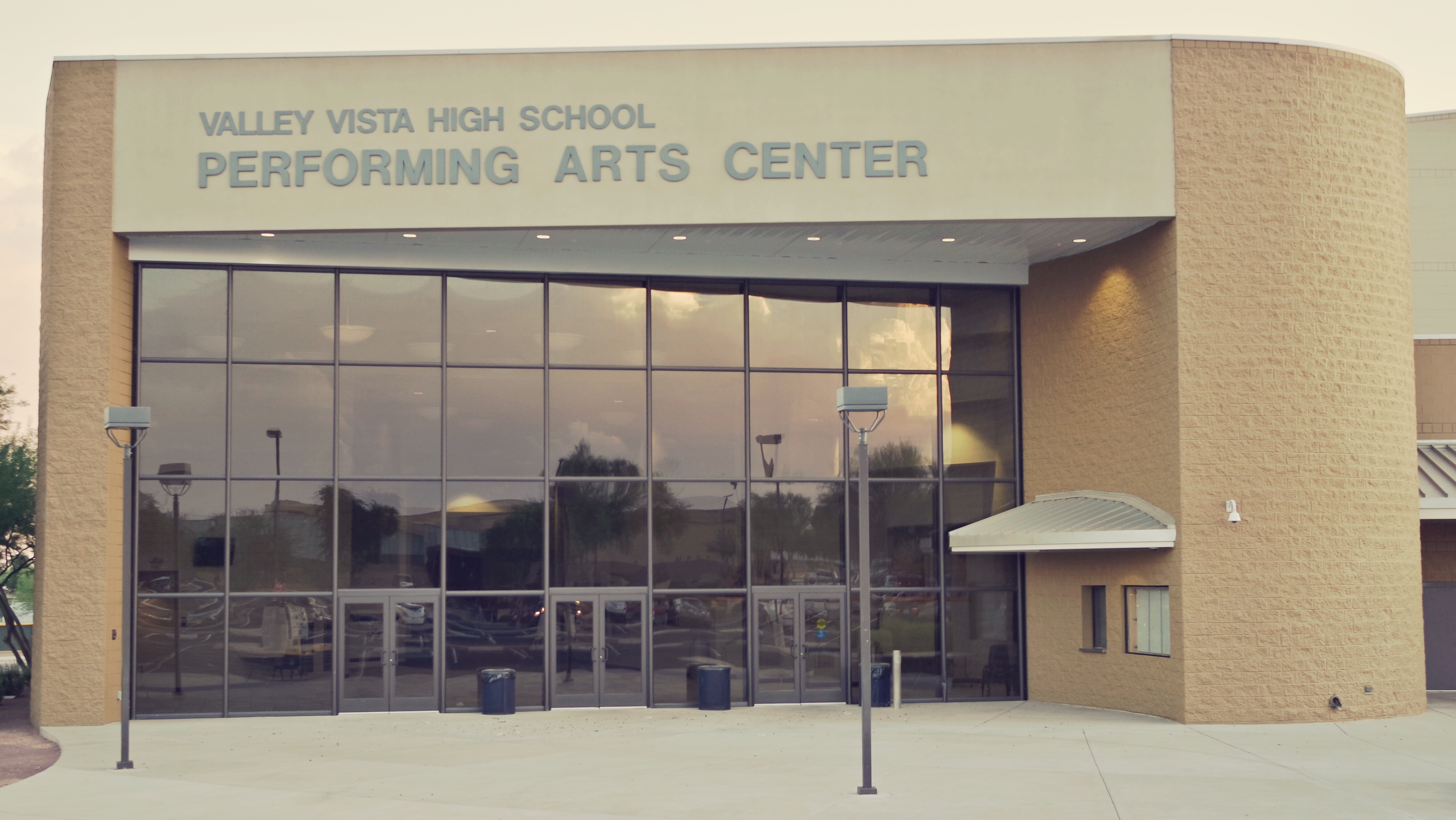

Location
- 15550 N Parkview Place; Surprise, Arizona 85374; United States

Information
- School type: Public high school
- Established: 2006
- School district: Dysart Unified School District No. 89
- Principal: Ginger Richards
- Teaching staff: 102.80 (FTE)
- Grades: 9-12
- Enrollment: 2,200+ (2025–2026)
- Student to teacher ratio: 23.76
- Colors: Purple, Dark Purple and Black
- Mascot: Promotional: Monsoon; Sports: Stormy / Rain
- Website: dysart.org/vvhs

Valley Vista High School is a high school in Surprise, Arizona under the jurisdiction of the Dysart Unified School District. This school is known for its Career & Technical Education (CTE) and Career & Technical Student Organizations (CTSO) programs.

== Sports Teams ==
| Sports | Boys | Girls |
|---|---|---|
| Badminton | ╳ | ✓ |
| Baseball | ✓ | ╳ |
| Basketball | ✓ | ✓ |
| Cross Country | ✓ | ✓ |
| Flag Football | ╳ | ✓ |
| Football | ✓ | ╳ |
| Golf | ✓ | ✓ |
| Sand Volleyball | ╳ | ✓ |
| Softball | ╳ | ✓ |
| Soccer | ✓ | ✓ |
| Swim & Dive | ✓ | ✓ |
| Tennis | ✓ | ✓ |
| Track & Field | ✓ | ✓ |
| Volleyball | ✓ | ✓ |
| Wrestling | ✓ | ✓ |

== History ==
Valley Vista High School, located in Surprise, Arizona, was established in 2006 as part of the Dysart Unified School District to serve the area’s rapidly growing population. The school was built to help reduce overcrowding at nearby campuses and to provide modern facilities for students in the western Phoenix metropolitan area.

== Notable alumni ==
- Logan Porter (class of 2013) - MLB catcher
