= Greenway High School =

Location
- 3930 West Greenway Road; Phoenix, Arizona 85053; United States; 33°37′35″N 112°08′38″W

Information
- Type: Public high school
- Motto: "Excellence Runs Green & Gold"
- Established: 1973; 53 years ago
- School district: Glendale Union High School District
- Principal: Amy DeMiola
- Teaching staff: 61.00 (FTE)
- 9th-12th: 9-12
- Enrollment: 1,376 (2023-2024)
- Student to teacher ratio: 22.56
- Colors: Green & gold
- Mascot: Demon
- Rival: Moon Valley High School
- Newspaper: The Demon Dispatch
- Website: Greenway High School

Greenway High School is a public secondary school located in Phoenix, Arizona. It is a part of the Glendale Union High School District. It was named after John Campbell Greenway, a mining engineer and United States Senator. In the 1994–95 and 1995-96 school years, it was honored as a Blue Ribbon school.

== History ==
Greenway opened in 1973 Thunderbird High School opened one year earlier, both schools feature the same architectural blueprints. Designed by Rossman Partners the buildings were constructed exclusively of metal with minimal ornamentation. Defco Construction Company of Tucson was general contractor who built the school.

== Academics ==
Greenway High School offers a small variety of Advanced Placement classes, as well as honors and dual enrollment.

== Clubs and programs ==
=== Naval Science NJROTC ===
- Greenway NJROTC earned the title of Distinguished Unit for the 4th year in a row in 2012.
- On October 6, the Air Rifle Team competed at Carver Mountain Air Rifle Match. The team placed 1st overall.
- On October 20, the Air Rifle Team competed at the 2012 Area 11 Qualifier and East/West Air Rifle Championship. The team won both matches for the 4th year in a row.

== Awards ==
- In 2025, Greenway High School earned the A+ School of Excellence Award, which is the highest recognition given by the Arizona Educational Foundation

== Notable alumni ==
- Pete Babcock — Head Coach of Varsity 1978-79 basketball team; GM of Toronto Raptors, Denver Nuggets, and Atlanta Hawks
- Chester Bennington — Linkin Park (graduated from Washington High School)
  - In the auditorium hallway, a mural can be found of Bennington's.
- Richie Brockel — NFL tight end for the San Diego Chargers and Carolina Panthers
- Dan Butler — Major League Baseball catcher for the Boston Red Sox
- Connie Clark — title-winning college softball player, Texas Longhorns softball program coach from 1997-2018
- Lauren Froderman — winner of Season 7 of So You Think You Can Dance
- Jennie Garth — former cast member on Beverly Hills, 90210
- Tiffany Granath — Playboy radio personality; former host of Playboy TV's Nightcalls
- Josh Hansen — professional soccer player
- Brad Lohaus — former NBA player
- Alejo López — Major League Baseball infielder for the Cincinnati Reds
- Shannon Marketic — Miss USA 1992
- Tony McConkey - politician, Maryland State Delegate
- Josh McDermitt — actor, The Walking Dead, Retired at 35, Last Comic Standing
- Frank Pollack — former NFL player w/ San Francisco 49ers, Super Bowl XXIX
- Tim Salmon — former MLB player with the Anaheim Angels
- Mike Salmon — former NFL player with the San Francisco 49ers and Buffalo Bills
- Lauren Scott — Nevada politician, lobbyist and civil rights activist
- Kimberly Yee — Arizona State Treasurer
