= Independence High School (Arizona) =

Public school in Maricopa County

- Independence.High School

Location
- 6602 North 75th Avenue; Glendale, Arizona 85303; United States; 33°31′55.01″N 112°13′17.39″W

Information
- Type: Public
- Opened: 1977; 49 years ago
- School district: Glendale Union High School District, Arizona, USA
- Principal: Robert Ambrose, Michael Siwek*, Jeannie Paparella*, Justin Tarver* (* Assistant Principal)
- Staff: 87.20 (FTE)
- Faculty: 82.6
- Grades: 9-12
- Enrollment: 2,048 (2023–2024)
- Student to teacher ratio: 23.49
- Colors: Red, white and blue
- Mascot: Patriot
- Rivals: Glendale High School
- Website: Independence High School

Independence High School (IHS) is a public high school located in Glendale, Arizona, United States, and is the most recent high school in the Glendale Union High School District. The school's name was picked by the school board because of the bicentennial observance. The school was scheduled to open in the summer of 1976, but was postponed due to construction and lack of demand from the district's student population. It opened during the 1977–1978 school year under principal Fed McClure. The initial enrollment was 420 students consisting of freshman and sophomore students only. The first graduating class was in 1980. The school celebrated its thirtieth anniversary during the 2007–2008 school year.

The school was designed by the local architecture firm Varney, Sexton, Sydnor Associates and built in the Brutalist style.

Two weeks after the school opened, a fire broke out destroying parts of the lower level, however classes resumed a few days later. A formal dedication was held on November 17, 1977, with the Honorable Bob Stump, representative, as guest speaker.

On February 12, 2016, the school was the site of a murder suicide shooting that killed two 15-year-old girls. Dorothy Dutiel shot and killed May Kieu before fatally shooting herself. The two girls had been in a romantic relationship, however had recently broke up, leading to Dutiel committing the murder-suicide. Dutiel had left a suicide note, explaining her motive and leaving a message for her family.

== Ethnic diversity ==
Independence's student ethnic diversity as of November 2023:

- Asian: 81 (3.95%)
- American Indian/Alaskan Native: Not Specified
- Black/African American: 130 (6.34%)
- Hispanic/Latino: 1633 (79.7%)
- Native Hawaiian/Pacific Islander: Not Specified
- Multiple Races: 27 (1.32%)
- White: 154 (7.52%)
