= Glendale Union High School District =

School district in Arizona, United States

Location
- Glendale, Maricopa County, Arizona, 85301; United States
- Coordinates: 33.5819°N 112.1258°W

District information
- Type: traditional and online
- President: Natalie Veidmark
- Superintendent: Matt Belden
- School board: Patty Kennedy, Patti Hussey, Laura Ramirez, Paul Ulan
- NCES District ID: 0403450

Students and staff
- Enrollment: 16,462 (2020-2021)
- Staff: 734.40 (on an FTE basis)
- Student–teacher ratio: 22.42

Other information
- Website: www.guhsdaz.org

Glendale Union High School District No. 205 is a school district headquartered in Glendale, Arizona, United States.

The union high school district operates nine comprehensive high schools and serves most of Glendale and a portion of Phoenix. It is the second largest high school-only district preceded by Phoenix Union.

Glendale Union High School District schools receive the graduates of the Washington Elementary School District and the Glendale Elementary School District. Glendale Elementary district is located in Glendale, Arizona and the Washington Elementary schools are in North Phoenix and Sunnyslope.

== Schools ==
=== Zoned ===
- Apollo (Glendale) – opened 1970
- Cortez (Phoenix) – opened 1960
- Glendale (Glendale) – opened 1911
- Greenway (Phoenix) – opened 1973
- Independence (Glendale) – opened 1977
- Moon Valley (Phoenix) – opened 1965
- Sunnyslope (Phoenix) – opened 1953
- Thunderbird (Phoenix) – opened 1972
- Washington (Phoenix) – opened 1955

=== Alternative ===
The GUHSD Online Learning Academy (formerly "Christown Academy" and "Metrocenter Academy"), is an alternative high school. It admits students who wish to take online courses, and it offers high school diplomas but not GEDs. In 2018–19 it had 247 students enrolled.

== Feeder school districts ==
- Glendale Elementary School District
- Washington Elementary School District
- Madison Elementary School District
