= Moon Valley High School =

Location
- 3625 West Cactus Road; Phoenix, Arizona 85029; United States; 33°35′43″N 112°08′14″W

Information
- School type: Public, secondary
- Motto: Success: Every Student, Every day
- Established: 1965; 61 years ago
- School district: Glendale Union High School District
- Principal: Steven Gould
- Teaching staff: 68.40 (FTE)
- Grades: 9-12
- Enrollment: 1,468 (2023–2024)
- Student to teacher ratio: 21.46
- Campus type: Closed
- Colors: Royal blue, red and white
- Fight song: "moon valley high!"
- Athletics conference: Arizona Interscholastic Association, Inc
- Mascot: Rocket
- Rival: Greenway High School
- Accreditation: North Central Association of Colleges on Secondary Schools
- Newspaper: Rocket Reporter
- Website: Moon Valley High School

Moon Valley High School is a public high school in Phoenix, Arizona, United States, and is a part of the Glendale Union High School District, which opened in 1965. Moon Valley is one of Arizona's leading educational establishments and is an excelling school according to the Arizona Department of Education. According to the brochure on their website, in 2017, they had a 96% graduation rate and an 80% extracurricular activity rate.

== History ==
The campus was designed by local architects Varney, Sexton Sydnor Associates who were responsible for other schools in the area. Construction was completed by Chanen Construction Company.

Unfinished buildings, blowing dirt, lack of grass and lack of facilities caused the high school's delayed opening in September 1965. At the time of opening, the number of faculty was 25.

During the 1973–1974 school year, Moon Valley was on double session due to an increasingly expanding metropolitan area. Thunderbird High School, which is about two miles east of Moon Valley, was under construction, but not yet opened. Renovations took place on the campus during the 1976–1977 school year.

Moon Valley began operating as a closed campus in the fall of 2002. In 2009, the campus opened a new building called the blast center where students go before and after school to receive help with their work. The school now has a day care on campus run by the child development class. In 2010, the culinary lab/class was renovated and designed to look and function like a restaurant's kitchen.

== Awards ==
Moon Valley High School was awarded Healthiest School in Arizona by the national Got Milk? Contest in September 2006. One award was granted in each of the 50 states and was accompanied by a US$1,000 grant for improving the health awareness of students.

In 2010, MVHS was awarded the State Department of Education Spotlight on Success Award.

The school is ranked among the top high schools in the country by U.S. News & World Report and Newsweek. Moon Valley was also part of the College Board's 2013 National Advanced Placement District of the Year.

== State championships ==
Moon Valley High School has won 18 state championships in various sports. Its most-winning program is the girls' softball team, which has won six state championships, titles including two back-to-back sets in the 1986–1987 and 1992–1993 seasons. Moon Valley also won the 1998 Arizona 4A high school basketball championship.

== Notable alumni ==
- Travis Brown – professional football player
- Chad Campbell – member of Arizona House of Representatives
- Jacob Chansley – conspiracy theorist
- Diane Downs – murderer
- Richard Jefferson – professional basketball player
- Mark Kerlin – professional soccer player
- Randy McClanahan – professional football player
- Chris McGaha – professional football player
- Ozzie Virgil, Jr. – professional baseball player
