= Chris McGaha =

American football player (born 1986)

Profile
- Position: Wide receiver

Personal information
- Born: October 21, 1986 (age 40); Phoenix, Arizona, U.S.
- Listed height: 6 ft 1 in (1.85 m)
- Listed weight: 199 lb (90 kg)

Career information
- College: Arizona State
- NFL draft: 2010: undrafted

Career history
- Jacksonville Jaguars (2010)

Awards and highlights
- Second-team All-Pac-10 (2009)

Christian James McGaha (born October 21, 1986) is an American former professional football player who was a wide receiver in the National Football League (NFL). He played college football for the Arizona State Sun Devils. He was signed as an undrafted free agent in the NFL by the Jacksonville Jaguars in 2010.

== Early life ==
Chris, born to Chuck and Nancy McGaha in Phoenix, Arizona, has one brother Charles, and two younger sisters, Sarah and Lyndsey. Chris attended Moon Valley High School in Phoenix, where he earned four letters in football, three in basketball and two in track and field. In 2004, he was the Arizona Republic Big School Player of the Year and scored 55 career touchdowns during his football career. He also was a standout in Basketball and was named All-region twice . McGaha won the Glendale Union High School District Slam Dunk contest as a junior and anchored Moon Valley's state qualifying 4 x 100 metres relay team. He is married to Aubrey McCloe and together they have one son, Carson, and one daughter, Reese.

== College career ==
McGaha enrolled at Arizona State University in 2005 and was redshirted his freshman year. He made his first start with ASU against Oregon State, he finished the season with 16 receptions for 238 yards and three touchdowns (second among ASU wide receivers), earning Pac-10 All-Freshman honors by The Sporting News. In the 2007 season, now under tenure of Dennis Erickson, he had an important role for the Sun Devils on third down offense, with 40 of his 52 receptions during the regular season going for first downs and was named an All-Pac 10 Honorable Mention From PhilSteele.com. He set a season-high against UCLA catching 9 passes for 123 yards. On the 2007 Holiday Bowl, McGaha caught a touchdown pass from Rudy Carpenter, he finished with nine receptions for 79 yards and one touchdown but Sun Devils fell against the Texas Longhorns 52-34. In the game's week he engaged to his girlfriend, popping the question on Christmas Day. He finished with 61 receptions for 830 yards, leading the team in both categories and tying for 10th on the single season list with Zach Miller in 2004. He also became a fan favorite for both his consistency and his ability to make spectacular catches, most notably his diving 31-yard reception against The University of Arizona. Prior to the 2008 season McGaha had surgery on his left toe. The injury bothered him throughout the season and his production dropped precipitously as the Sun Devils struggled. He finished the season with 35 catches for 501 yards, both good for second on the team.

== Professional career ==
In 2010, McGaha signed with the Jacksonville Jaguars as an undrafted free agent. He was waived/injured on July 7, 2010. McGaha was placed on injured reserve by the Jaguars September 1
