= Thunderbird High School =

Location
- 1750 West Thunderbird Road; Phoenix, Arizona 85023; United States; 33°36′46″N 112°05′49″W

Information
- School type: Public high school
- Established: 1972; 54 years ago
- School district: Glendale Union High School District
- Teaching staff: 68.60 (FTE)
- Grades: 9-12
- Enrollment: 1,547 (2023–2024)
- Student to teacher ratio: 22.55
- Colors: Orange, Blue
- Mascot: Titans (formerly Chiefs)
- Website: Thunderbird High School

Thunderbird High School is a public high school located in northwestern Phoenix, Arizona. The school is a part of the Glendale Union High School District.

== Feeder schools ==
Some schools in the Washington Elementary School District feed into Thunderbird High School.

Feeder junior high schools include Mountain Sky Junior High School and Cholla Middle School.

== History ==
The school opened in 1972. Greenway High School opened the following year; both schools feature the same architectural blueprints. Designed by Rossman Partners the buildings were constructed exclusively of metal with minimal ornamentation. Twin City Construction Company of Fargo, North Dakota built the school. The construction company was later fired by the district for failing to meet the construction deadline, this would later result in a lawsuit being filed by the company. Remaining construction work was completed by other contractors. Thunderbird had rotating walls and open concept classrooms when it opened. By 1976, the school had filled up with more than 2,100 students, in 1976 the first class to have gone through all four years (freshman-senior) at the school graduated, and by 1979, that number reached its peak, with 2,742 students attending Thunderbird. Over time, enrollment declined, however; by the mid-1980s, the school's size increased at just below 2,000 students and has since slowly decreased to its current size.

== Notable alumni ==
- Frank Rosaly, American Jazz Musician
- Danielle Ammaccapane, LPGA golfer
- Rhonda Rajsich, racquetball world champion
- Dexter Davis, professional football player
- Ron J. Friedman and Steve Bencich, Hollywood screenwriters for Chicken Little, Brother Bear, Open Season, and Cats & Dogs 2
- Chris Gruetzemacher, mixed martial artist currently competing in the Lightweight division of the Ultimate Fighting Championship (UFC).
- Todd Kalis, former NFL offensive lineman
- Kevin Long, batting coach, New York Yankees, New York Mets, Washington Nationals
- Nick DeLeon, soccer player
- Pablo Mastroeni, soccer player
- Georganne Moline, 2012 Olympian in track & field
- Cheryl Casone, TV News anchor
- Jennifer Rubin, model and actress, Class of 1980
- Alex Sogard, Head Coach of Wright State Baseball and former MLB player
- Eric Sogard, Former MLB player (A's, Brewers, Blue Jays, Rays, Cubs)
- Scott Stamper, former professional football player
- Anthony Burch, Leader Writer of Borderlands 2, Gearbox Software
- Adam Rex, Illustrator and writer (The True Meaning of Smekday influence to DreamWorks Home (2015 film))
- Gary Mauer, Broadway and national tour actor/singer
- Ashly Burch, an actress, voice actress, singer, and writer, known for her role as Tiny Tina in the video game Borderlands 2
