= Safari Hotel =

Former resort hotel in Scottsdale, Arizona, United States

- Interactive map of the Safari Hotel area

General information
- Architectural style: Mid-century modern
- Classification: Hotel
- Location: 4611 N. Scottsdale Road, Scottsdale, Arizona, United States
- Coordinates: 33°30′14″N 111°55′33″W
- Groundbreaking: March 1956
- Opened: November 6, 1956
- Renovated: 1957, 1959, 1969
- Closed: September 4, 1998
- Demolished: 1999
- Cost: approx. $1 million

Technical details
- Floor count: 2
- Grounds: >9 acres

Design and construction
- Architect: Al Beadle
- Developer: Ernie Uhlman
- Main contractor: Gilbert & Dolan

Other information
- Number of rooms: 184

The Safari Hotel was a resort hotel in Scottsdale, Arizona, which operated from 1956 to 1998. Designed by noted Phoenix architect Al Beadle, the Safari is noted for being one of the resorts which helped turn Scottsdale into a tourism destination, along with the Hotel Valley Ho and the Mountain Shadows Resort.

== History ==
Ground was broken in March 1956 by Gilbert & Dolan Construction Co. Developed by Ernie Uhlman, the hotel opened on November 16, 1956, with the Scottsdale mayor and Miss Arizona in attendance. The resort initially offered 108 rooms. Upon opening, the resort featured its own orchestra, which released records on the resort's own record label.

In 1959, the resort expanded by building another 80 rooms and a banquet room which could seat up to 700 people at the east end of the property.

The resort was the headquarters for both the Boston Red Sox and the Baltimore Orioles baseball teams during spring training in the late 1950s.

The Safari was very popular in the 1960s as a destination resort. The hotel featured the French Quarter nightclub, and a 24-hour coffee shop, and the Gracious Dining restaurant. These opened in the early 1960s after Paul Shank took over the resort's restaurants, spending $400,000 on renovations which replaced the resort's orchestra with more contemporary entertainment. In order for the nightclub to open, the city of Scottsdale had to repeal its ban on dancing. The French Quarter hosted entertainment acts such as Rosemary Clooney and the Mills Brothers. The French Quarter spent $60,000 on a remodeling in 1969. At the time, the Safari's restaurants employed 250 employees and claimed to have the highest volume of food sales in the state of Arizona. However the French Quarter could not maintain its success and closed in 1978 after pivoting to dinner theatre during the mid-1970s.

Hogan's Heroes actor Bob Crane was seen at the Safari shortly before his homicide in 1978.

The Brown Derby restaurant operated in the resort from 1981 to 1996.

== Closure and demolition ==
The hotel was sold in 1986 to PALS Development Corporation, which explored a number of redevelopment options during the 1990s. By that time, the hotel had become dated and could not compete with the newer resorts that had opened in Scottsdale.

The resort closed in September 1998 with a proposal to redevelop the site with a $143 million Marriott hotel, and the buildings demolished in 1999. However, the Marriott plan never materialised, and in 2005 the site was vacant apart from the former resort's palm trees, which were not removed. By 2010, condominiums had been completed on the site of the resort.
