= Hotel Valley Ho =

Historic hotel in Scottsdale, Arizona

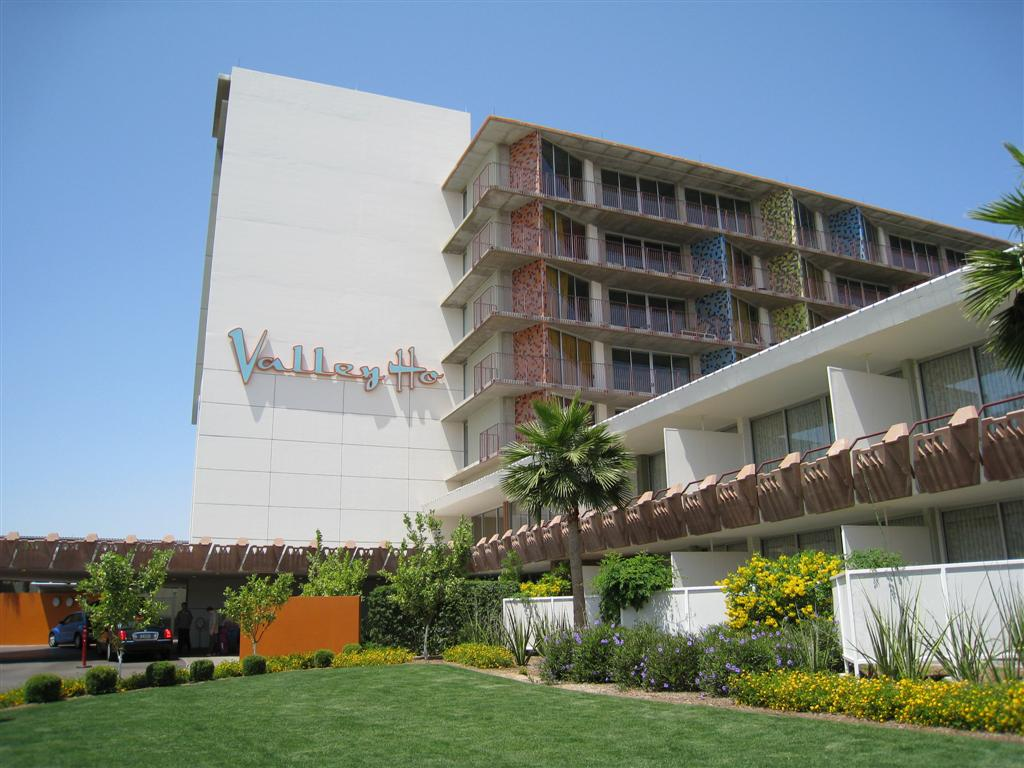
- Hotel Valley Ho

- Location within Arizona

General information
- Location: 6850 East Main Street, Scottsdale, Arizona
- Coordinates: 33°29′37″N 111°56′0″W
- Opening: December 20, 1956
- Operator: Benchmark, Pyramid Luxury & Lifestyle

Technical details
- Floor count: 7
- Floor area: 220,000 square feet (20,000 m^{2})

Design and construction
- Architects: Edward L. Varney (1956); Allen+Philp (2005)
- Main contractor: Kitchell-Phillips Contractors Inc. (1956)

Other information
- Number of rooms: 241
- Number of restaurants: 1

Website
- https://www.hotelvalleyho.com

Hotel Valley Ho is a historic hotel in Scottsdale, Arizona. Also called the Valley Ho and, for 28 years, the Ramada Valley Ho, the hotel was designed by Edward L. Varney. It first opened in 1956 with a forward-looking and futuristic design. Movie stars and famous baseball players stayed, and the building quickly became known for its trendsetting guests and its fashionable atmosphere. The success of the venture resulted in expansion in 1958, with two additional two-story wings of guest rooms extending to the north. Though proposed by Varney, a central tower of guest rooms, rising over the lobby, was not built.

The property was bought by the Ramada hotel chain in 1973, and was redecorated to cover the 1950s design, seen at the time as outdated. No longer in vogue, but centrally located, the hotel remained prominent for years, and hosted conferences, business meetings, and vacationers. Under Ramada management, however, the property began to show a lack of maintenance, and its popularity declined. It closed in 2001 and its demolition was considered when no purchase offers were received. Admirers of the hotel's exemplary architecture and its local history rallied to save it, and it was placed on the Scottsdale Historic Register.

In 2002, the hotel was bought by Westroc Hotels & Resorts and underwent a renovation, which was completed in 2005. Conceived anew by the architectural firm Allen+Philp, a seven-story tower with guest rooms and condominiums was built above the lobby, in the spirit of Varney's proposal. New restaurants were incorporated, including a retro-chic seasonal-American restaurant (ZuZu), and a Trader Vic's franchise at the northeast end of the property (closed in 2011). The hotel's original jet-age design was restored as much as possible, augmented with 2000s-era fixtures.

The Hotel Valley Ho is a AAA "Four Diamond Award" winner. Author and architect Alan Hess called the hotel "one of the best-preserved mid-century hotels in the country".

== History ==
When it opened in 1956, the hotel did not have a tower.

Robert and Evelyn Foehl were the first to conceive of the hotel. Robert Foehl trained at the Biltmore Hotel in Los Angeles, California. He then bought the Hotel San Marcos in Chandler, Arizona. Following that, he managed the Jokake Inn in Scottsdale. Evelyn Foehl managed the Hacienda del Sol in Tucson as one of the few women in the hotel business. The two established a core of investors to build a new hotel on an 8.86-acre (3.59 ha) site in Scottsdale and, to design it, they hired Edward L. Varney, one of the most prominent local architects of the time. Varney set the hotel around a central pool lounge and used extended horizontal lines in the wings where rooms included air conditioning for year-round operation, a first for Scottsdale. A curving porte-cochere with abstract Southwestern designs in cast concrete opened onto a high-ceilinged lobby, which gave guests a "sense of arrival", a feature often used by Frank Lloyd Wright. The tall lobby connected guests to a restaurant, a lounge, a nightclub, and the central pool. The interior design was conceived and executed by interior architect Thelma Hawkins, the director of Barker Bros. Phoenix Studio of Interior Design. The construction contract was awarded to Kitchell-Phillips Contractors Inc. The project was completed on December 20, 1956, at a cost of $1.5 million, an amount equivalent to $17.8 million in current value.

Varney added an unusual feature for a hotel of the time: a parking lot. The parking lot afforded guests the personal comfort and freedom of pulling their cars very close to their rooms. This was the first motor resort in Scottsdale.

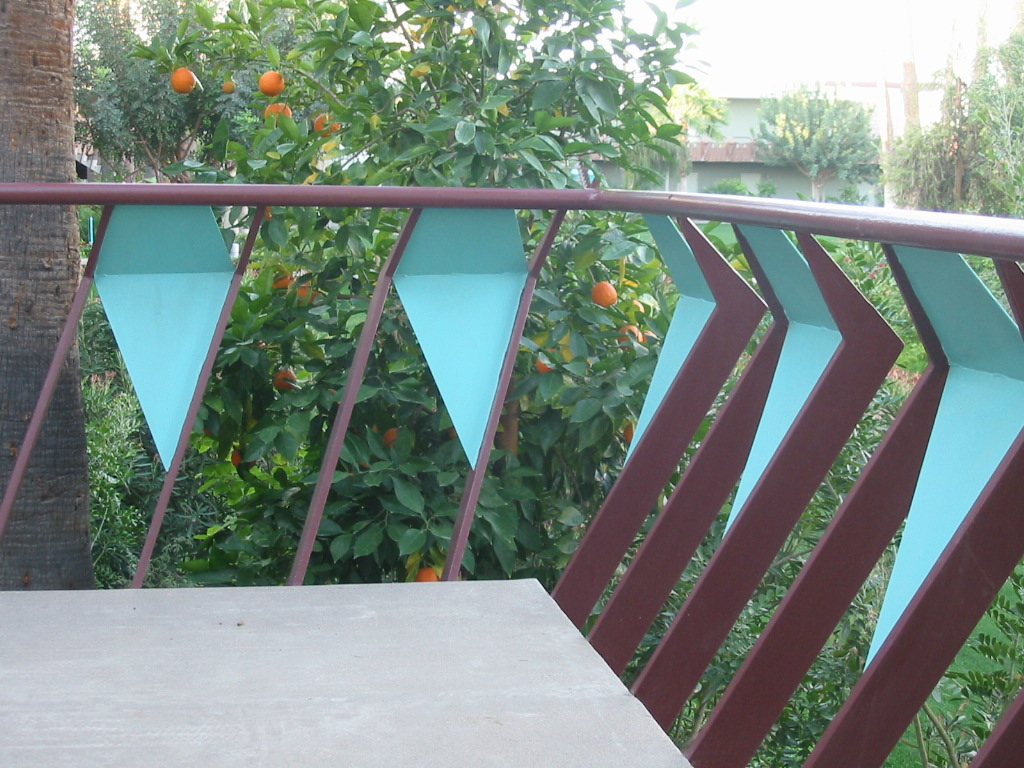
Angled banisters on the landing of an external stairway

The Foehls held a contest in March 1956 to name the as-yet-uncompleted hotel. They specified that the name should have a "westward flavor" like its parent, the Westward Ho in Phoenix. The winning name, "Valley Ho", was selected because the location was at the periphery of Paradise Valley, an affluent area, and because the identical "Ho" connected the new hotel with the older one in Phoenix. Later, it was discovered that ho means "you are welcomed here, this is a friendly place" in a local Native American language.

The Foehls knew many people in the Hollywood film industry, and a number of film stars stayed at the hotel. In late December 1957, Robert Wagner and Natalie Wood celebrated their wedding reception at the hotel. Bette Davis, Roy Rogers, Bing Crosby, Frankie Avalon, Humphrey Bogart, Betty Grable, Janet Leigh, Marilyn Monroe, Zsa Zsa Gabor, Ingrid Bergman, Cary Grant, and Tony Curtis were known to have stayed there. Sometimes, late at night, Jimmy Durante would come down from his room to play the piano in the lounge for other sleepless guests. The Foehls ran the hotel very closely—they lived on the premises.

Local Scottsdale corporation Motorola used the hotel to house transferred employees while they looked for permanent residences. Some of the baseball players, coaches, and managers taking part in the spring training Cactus League of Arizona stayed at the hotel, including Joe DiMaggio, Ted Williams, and Leo Durocher, the latter requesting Room 103 every time he visited for its nearness to the lobby. Chicago-based sports reporter Dave Hoekstra writes that he and his "Bleacher Bum" colleagues did not have enough money to stay under the same roof as the baseball players they were watching and instead crowded into rooms at the nearby Safari Hotel. Hoekstra notes that, throughout the 1960s, "the Ho was the high-roller place in the Sun Valley".

The Valley Ho competed favorably with the Safari Hotel, erected about the same time east of Scottsdale Fashion Square. Both hotels offered premium hospitality and helped Scottsdale expand its public image. With the Valley Ho an immediate financial success, in 1958 Varney designed and built two more wings of guest rooms to the northwest of the original complex. The same materials and style were employed in the expansion buildings, but instead of single exterior corridors with rooms to one side, the added wings used central corridors with rooms on both sides. Another Scottsdale landmark hotel, the Mountain Shadows Resort, opened the following year, in 1959. These three tourist havens reflected a desired cosmopolitan and exotic atmosphere in Scottsdale.

== Renovation ==
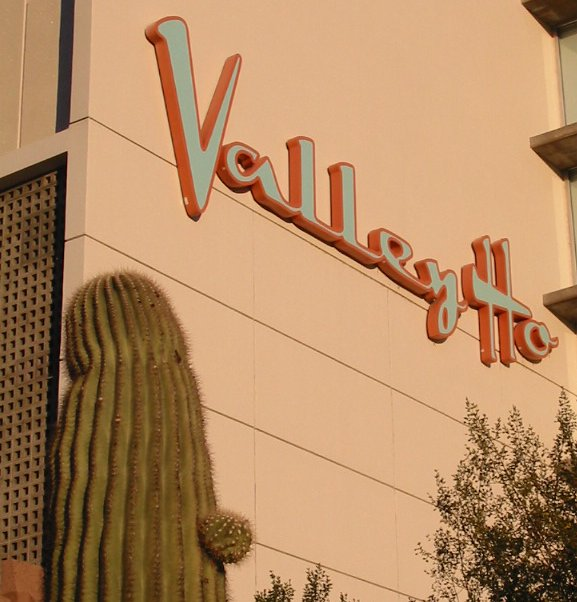
Rosy dawn light on the white tower

In 1973, Robert Foehl died and Evelyn Foehl sold the hotel to Ramada, a hotel chain. The Ramada managers remodeled the hotel, stripping out and covering much of what they considered an outdated interior. The hotel was named Ramada Valley Ho. Though it remained a fashionable location for a while, its original character was largely absent and it began to suffer from neglect and disrepair. It continued to host conferences and business meetings, such as the Natural Health, Aromatherapy and Herb Conference & Trade Show in early 2000, and the Arizona LANBasher's League party in early 2001. Later that year, the hotel closed and was put on the market. Plans for its demolition were considered when no offers were made. To protect it, Alan Hess wrote a letter detailing its importance, and a successful campaign was mounted in Scottsdale to place it on the Scottsdale Historic Register in recognition of its significance to city history and its architectural connection to the past. To save it from demolition, business partners Scott Lyon and Bill Nassikas of Westroc Hotels & Resorts bought the property and undertook an extensive renovation and building addition that eventually cost $80M. Evelyn Foehl died in August 2003, two years after the hotel was closed for renovation.

The local Scottsdale architectural firm Allen+Philp accepted the task of renovation, and in researching the hotel's history, they found that in the 1950s, Varney had originally intended a tower of guest rooms to rise above the central lobby, a feature that was not built at the time. Allen+Philp designed a seven-story tower for the purpose of giving the new hotel owners a chance of greater financial viability. Architect Mark Philp said of the project, "We worked to stay true to the spirit of the original." Interior designer Cole-Martinez carefully updated the decorations and furnishings with "one foot firmly in the present with subtle salutes to the past". Chicago reporter Hoekstra happily noted that the renovation retained the original "Jetsons-in-the-desert flavor". The hotel re-opened on December 20, 2005, exactly 49 years after its first grand opening.

== Amenities ==
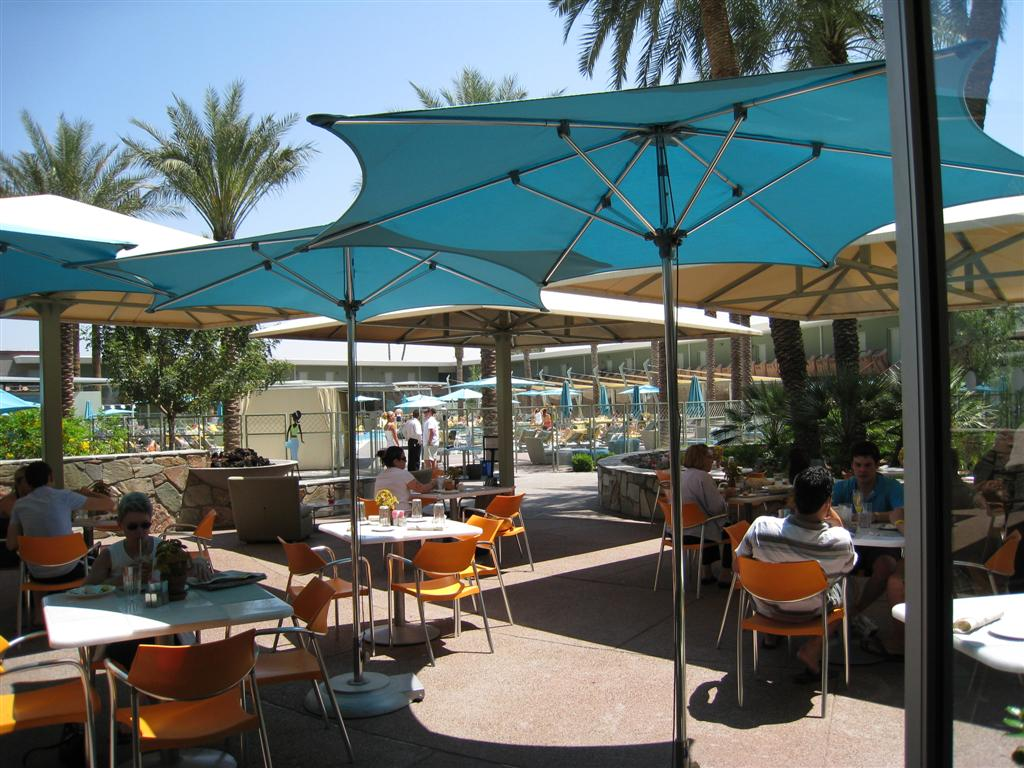
Dining area around the pool

The hotel operates one restaurant and has a wide selection of guest rooms and suites in addition to over 30 luxury condominiums for permanent residents. The condos range from 1,450 to 2,400 square feet (135 to 223 m^{2}). The location is 15 minutes by car from Phoenix Sky Harbor International Airport and from Arizona State University. Hotel Valley Ho has earned a "Four Diamond Award" from AAA each year since 2007, and after passing the "Standards of Excellence" was invited to join Preferred Hotels and Resorts in 2006. The Valley Ho is a top-ten-ranked Scottsdale property on TripAdvisor.com, topping even the renowned five-star Phoenician Resort. In a nod to Mad Men, the widely acclaimed television series that takes place largely during the Valley Ho's original heyday, one TripAdvisor reviewer noted: "Don Draper would approve."

Centrally placed off the main lobby, ZuZu is a restaurant that offers inventive American food and craft cocktails, under the direction of Executive Chef Russell LaCasce. Food and drinks are also served at OH Pool Bar + Cabanas.

There are 21 large studio rooms which feature a bathroom separated only by a curtain. Eleven cabana rooms overlooking the pool come with a double-sized patio. Two executive suites and three terrace suites include an 800-square-foot (74 m^{2}) balcony or patio.

Since its renovation, Jamie Foxx, Eddie Van Halen, and Korn have stayed at the hotel, and Robert Wagner has returned from time to time.

== Architectural style ==
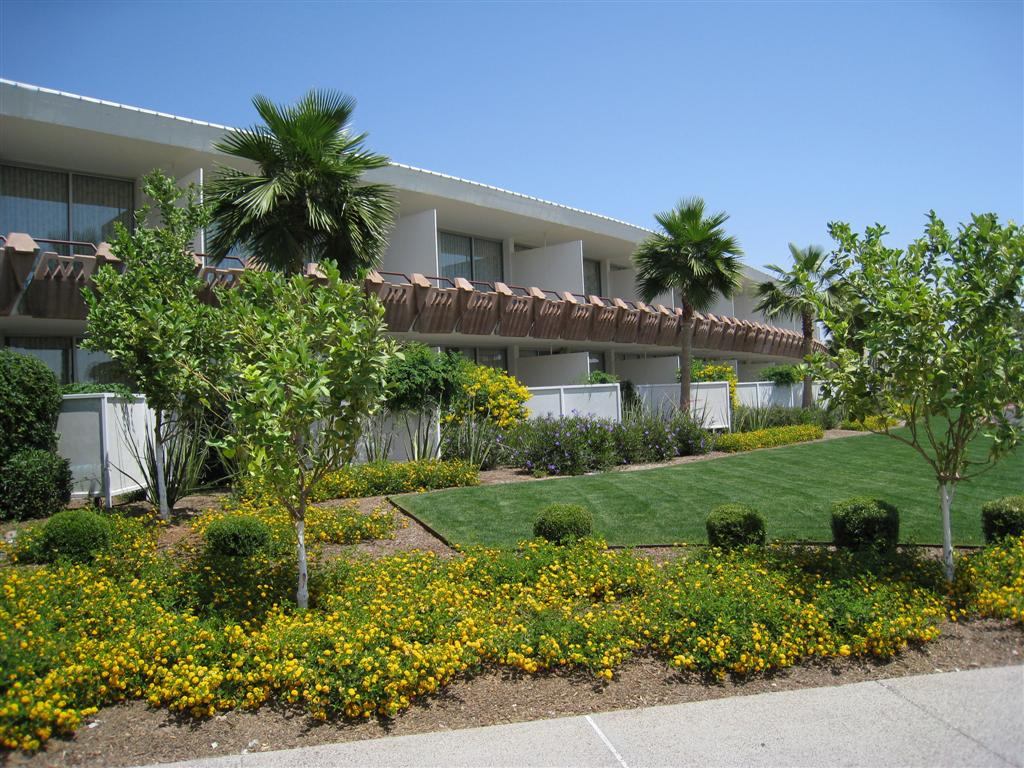
East wing

The Hotel Valley Ho is a striking example of the mid-century modern architectural style. Varney's use of masonry, cast and poured concrete, natural stone, and wide expanses of glass make for a close connection between the building and its environment. Stone floor and wall patterns link the exterior entry and the lobby, as does the extension of the redwood ceiling. The hotel is now considered one of the finest examples of organic architecture. Rooms in the two adjacent wings added in the late 1950s are unusual, and remarkably forward-thinking even by mid-century design standards, for their high nine-foot-ceilings. The prevailing trend at the time of original construction was low-ceilinged rooms, in some cases with ceilings only seven feet above ground level, but the Valley Ho's rooms feel exceptionally roomy and airy thanks to its original decision to buck design trends.

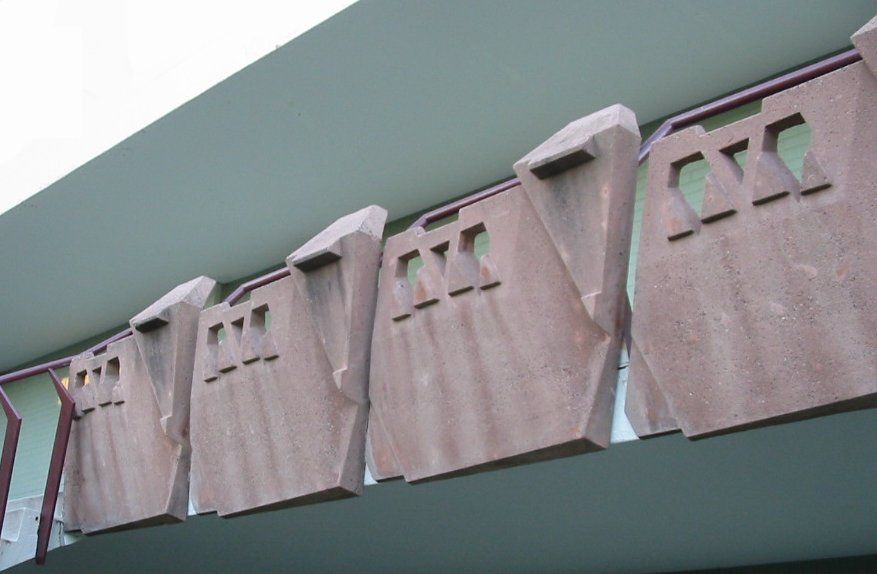
More than one mile (1.6 km) of reddish concrete forms are used as a repeating motif along the balconies.

The repeated horizontal rows of V-shaped burnished red concrete forms resemble abstract arrowheads. These precast forms, extending horizontally, give a modest "Southwestern" or "American Indian" flavor to the building.

During the renovation, walls and coverings were stripped away to reveal 1950s features. Drywall was removed from guest room walls to highlight the original masonry bricks. Walls partitioning the central lobby were torn down to open up Varney's intended connection between the indoor and outdoor public spaces. Concrete columns in the lobby were stripped of mirrors added by Ramada so as to show their original design.

The hotel offers a 90-minute architectural tour, available by appointment and led by experts from Ultimate Art & Cultural Tours of Scottsdale. The tour is focused on the hotel's design and Hollywood past, and includes a look inside some of the restored rooms, a walk around the grounds, and a stop at the Sky Line Rooftop for wonderful views of Phoenix and Scottsdale.
