= Edward L. Varney =

American architect (1914–1998)

- Born: October 11, 1914; Alameda, California
- Died: June 30, 1998 (aged 83); Phoenix, Arizona
- Occupation: Architect
- Practice: Gilmore & Varney Edward L. Varney Associates Varney, Sexton, Sydnor Associates Varney, Sexton, Lunsford, Aye Associates
- Buildings: Hotel Valley Ho, Sun Devil Stadium, Glendale Community College (Arizona)

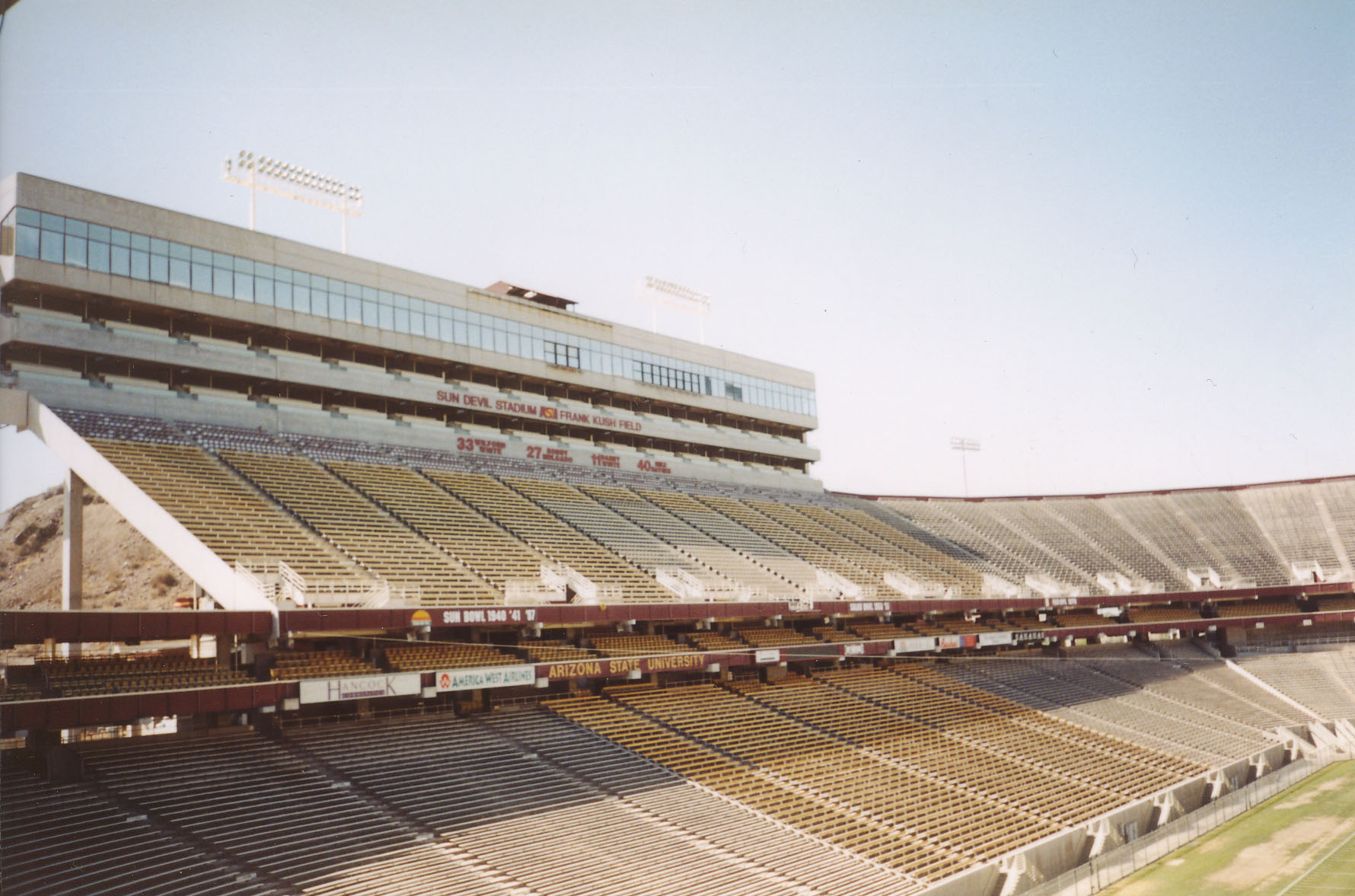
Sun Devil Stadium, designed by Varney in 1958

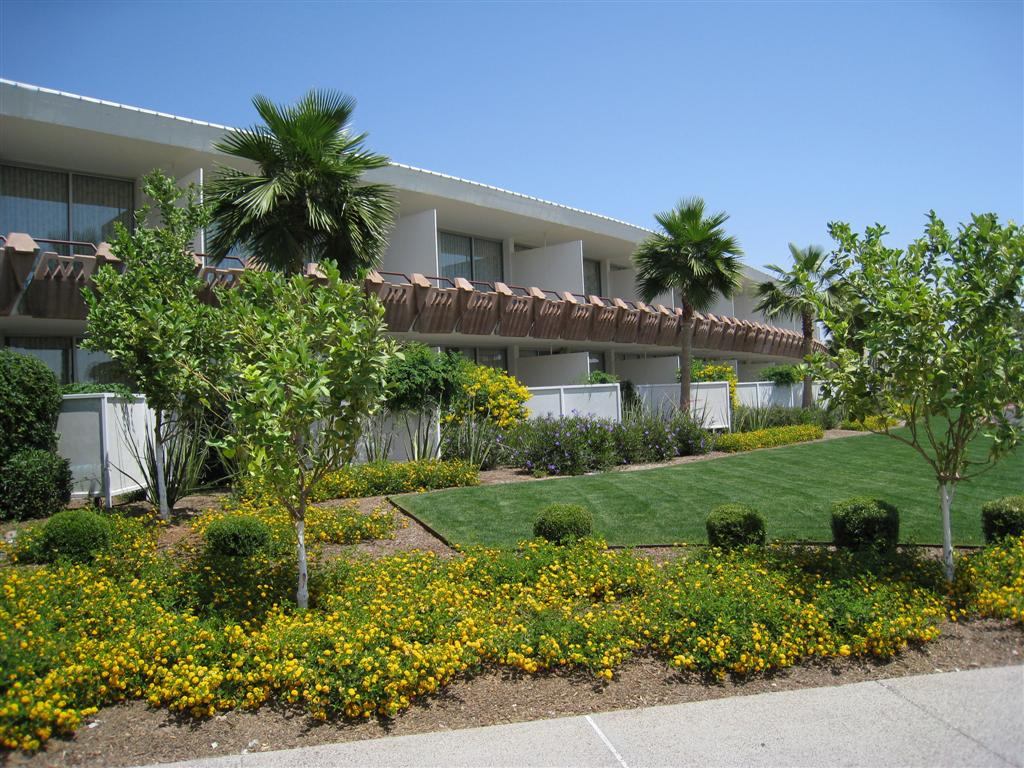
Hotel Valley Ho, Scottsdale 1956

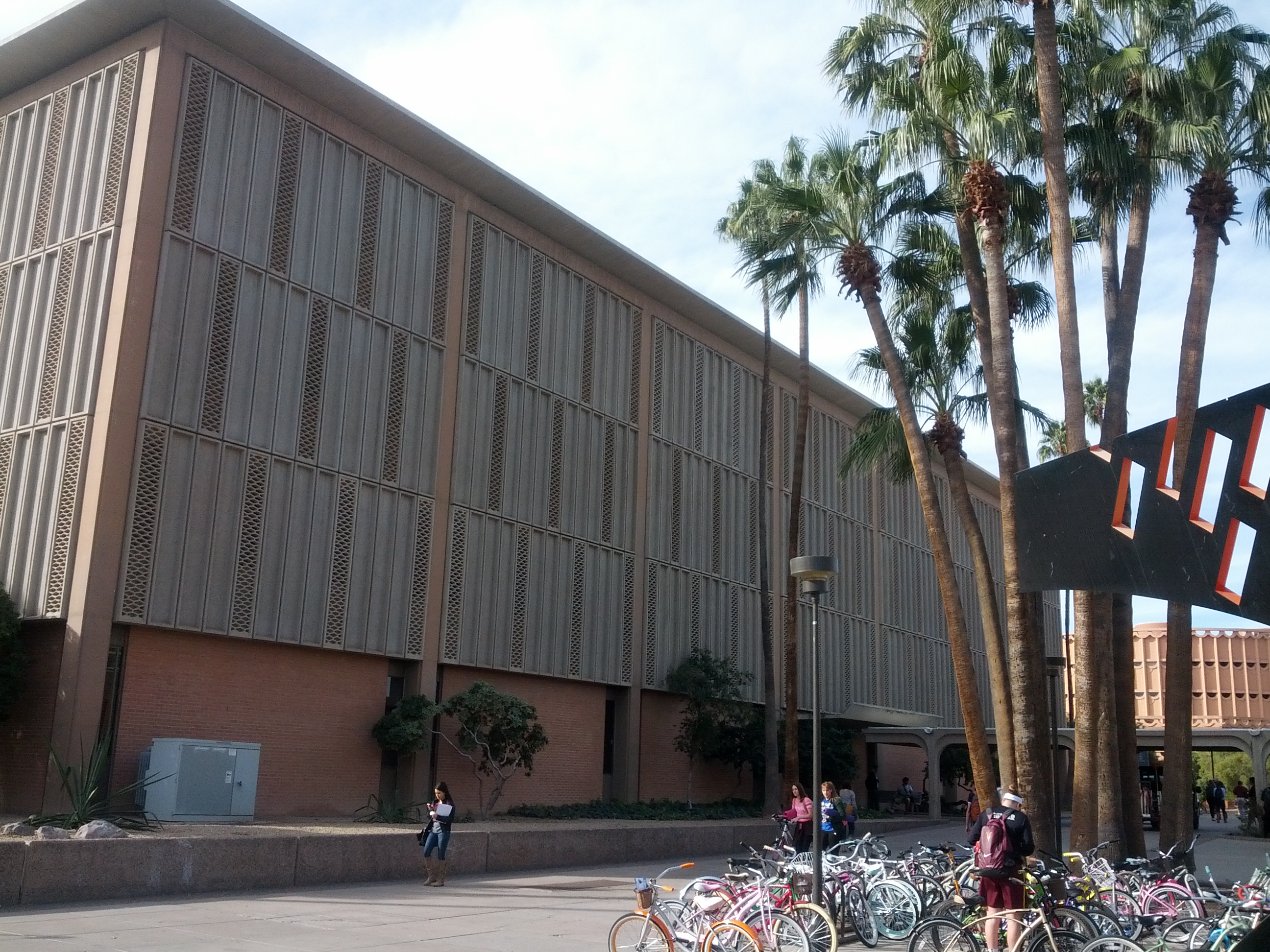
H.B. Farmer Building ASU 1962

Edward Leighton Varney Jr. (1914–1998) was an American Modernist architect working in Phoenix, Arizona from 1937 until his retirement in 1985. He designed the Hotel Valley Ho in Scottsdale, and Sun Devil Stadium at Arizona State University. In 1941, he began his career, which would extend to his retirement in 1985. His firm would continue designing buildings into the 1990s.

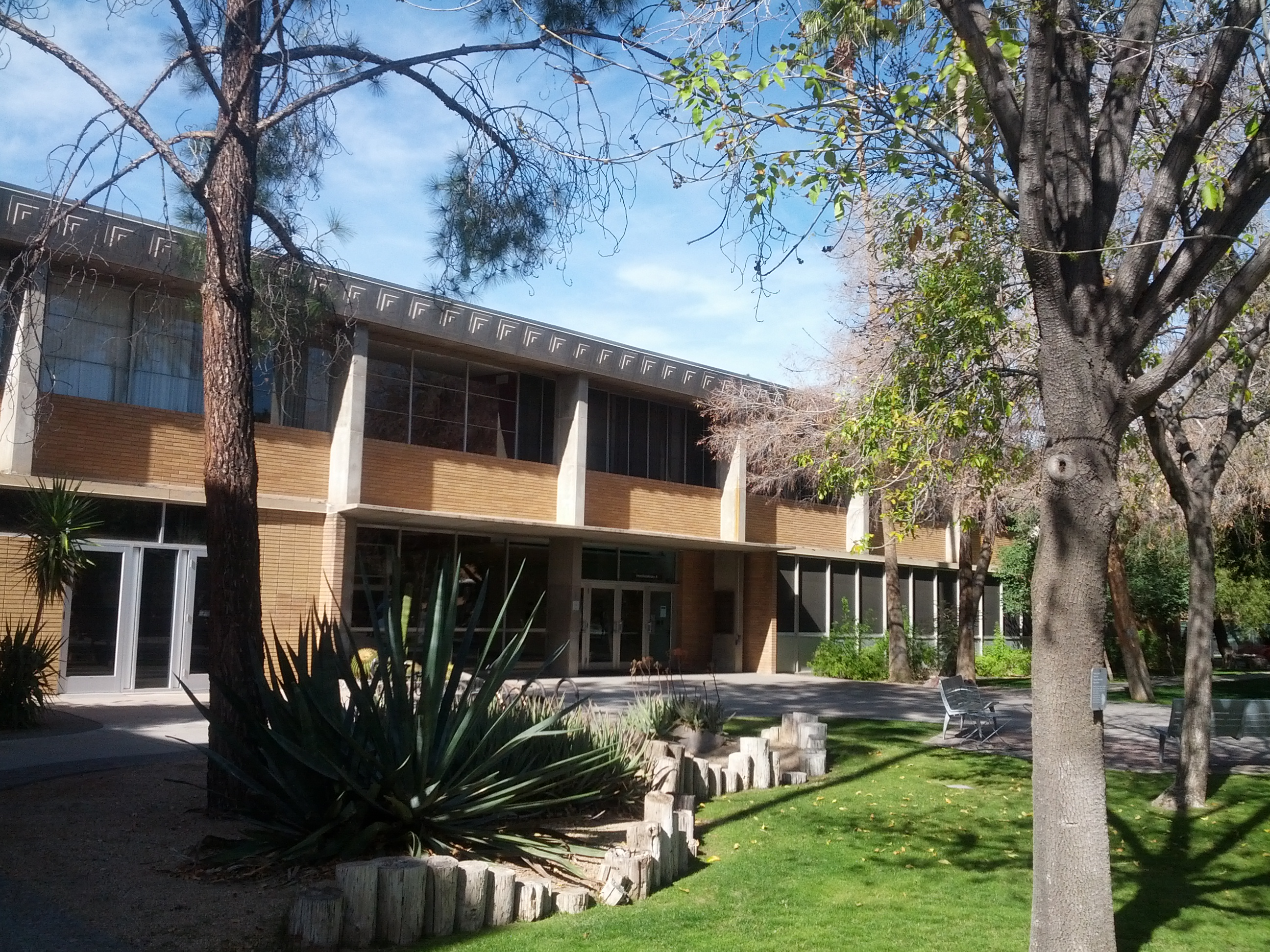
Administration Buildings, now Interdisciplinary Buildings A and B, ASU 1950-51

== Life and career ==
Edward Leighton Varney Jr. was born on October 11, 1914, in Alameda, California, the son of Edward Leighton, and Frances Deane, Varney. He attended the University of California at Berkeley before transferring to the University Southern California where he graduated with a Bachelor of Arts degree in architecture in 1938. That same year he moved to Phoenix and took a job with O.A. Bell Architects working as a draftsman on the Arizona Capital addition. In 1941, he partnered with Charles Gilmore and started the firm of Gilmore & Varney. In 1946 after Charles Gilmore unexpectedly died of a heart attack, Varney reorganized his firm into, Edward L. Varney Associates. He was soon joined by Reginald Sydnor, and Robert Sexton and in 1965 the firm was reorganized into Varney, Sexton, Sydnor Associates. Varney's firm specialized in designing industrial facilities such as those for Motorola, General Electric, Sperry Rand and Emerson Electric. The firm also specialized in educational structures designing several buildings on the Tempe campus of Arizona State University as well as many schools for the local school districts. Varney is credited with mentoring some influential architects in Arizona, including Ralph Haver, Richard E. Drover, and Frederick P. Weaver. in 1971, Varney was made a fellow in the American Institute of Architects. In 1980, Reginald Sydnor, a partner in the firm, took early retirement. The firm was subsequently reorganized into Varney, Sexton, Lunsford, Aye Associates with John C. Lunsford and Khin Aye becoming partners. Varney retired in 1985 and died on June 30, 1998. After Varney retired the firm would continue under the same name with Robert Sexton Serving as president. The firm continued designing many large scale projects well into the 1990s.

== Selected works ==
Works by Varney's firm include:

As Gilmore & Varney (1941-1946)

- 1941-1942 Litchefield Subdivision, Goodyear, AZ
- 1942 Van Dorn Home, Phoenix, AZ
- 1942 Yuma Army Airport, Yuma, AZ
- 1943 Maricopa County Health Center, Phoenix, AZ (Demolished)
- 1945 Machan Elementary School, Phoenix, AZ (Demolished)
- 1945 Marcus Lawrence Memorial Clinic, Cottonwood, AZ
- 1945 Winslow City Jail, Winslow, AZ
- 1945 Newberry Electric Corporation, Phoenix, AZ
- 1945 Neil B. McGinnis Equipment Company (Now The Vintage 45) Phoenix, AZ
- 1945 St. Agnes Catholic Church, Phoenix, AZ
- 1945 Sacred Heart Church School, Mesa, AZ
- 1946 Phoenix Merchandise Mart, Phoenix, AZ
- 1946 Encanto Village shopping center, Phoenix, AZ
- 1946 Village Drive-In, Phoenix, AZ (Demolished)

As Edward L. Varney Associates (1946-1965)

- 1947 Home for Mr. B. D. Tade, Phoenix, AZ
- 1947 Flagstaff High School Gymnasium, Flagstaff, AZ
- 1947-1949 West High School, Phoenix, AZ (with Lescher & Mahoney, H. H. Green and Edwin Dwight Chenault)
- 1948 Winslow Grammar School, Winslow, AZ
- 1948 Chandler Elementary School, Chandler, AZ
- 1948 Renovation of Coles Furniture Store, Phoenix, AZ
- 1948 Canada Dry Bottling Plant, Phoenix, AZ (Demolished)
- 1948 Sunnyslope School, Phoenix, AZ (Demolished)
- 1948 Valley Garden Center, Phoenix, AZ
- 1948 Washington Woman's Club, Phoenix, AZ
- 1949 Shipping Center, 901-915 N 16th Street, Phoenix, AZ
- 1949 Expansion of First Baptist Church, Phoenix, AZ
- 1949 Home for O. D. Miller, Phoenix, AZ
- 1949 Renovation of Paul Bennet Goodyear Tire Store, Phoenix, AZ
- 1949 Phoenix College Home Economics Building, Phoenix, AZ (with Lescher & Mahoney)
- 1949 Arizona Country Club (clubhouse), Phoenix, AZ
- 1949 Flagstaff Airport Administration Building, Flagstaff, AZ (with William Francis Cody)
- 1949 Yuma Airport Administration Building, Yuma, AZ
- 1949 Covenant Presbyterian Church, Phoenix, AZ
- 1949 Douglas High School, Douglas, AZ
- 1950 Home in Sun View Estates, Phoenix, AZ
- 1950 Monterey School (now Monterey Park School) Phoenix, AZ
- 1950 Roosevelt Counsel Boy Scouts of America Center, Phoenix, AZ (Demolished)
- 1950 Phoenix Fire Station No. 9 (now SAB Southwest Architectural Builders) Phoenix, AZ
- 1950 Motorola 56th Street research facility (now Great Hearts Academy) Phoenix, AZ (significantly altered)
- 1950 Valley National Bank Branch (now Bank of the West) Winslow, AZ
- 1950-1951 Administration Buildings, Arizona State University (now Interdisciplinary buildings A and B) Tempe, AZ
- 1951 Expansion of Central Heating and Refrigeration Plant, Arizona State University, Tempe, AZ
- 1952 First National Bank of Arizona Branch (now Rock of Salvation Ministries) Phoenix, AZ
- 1953 Paradise Valley Country Club, Paradise Valley, AZ (Demolished)
- 1953 Sunnyslope High School, Phoenix, AZ
- 1954 Camelback High School, Phoenix, AZ
- 1954 South Mountain High School, Phoenix, AZ
- 1954 General Electric Supply Company Plant, Phoenix, AZ
- 1954 Camelback Inn Cholla Room Restaurant, Phoenix, AZ
- 1955 Washington High School, Phoenix, AZ
- 1956 Motorola 52nd Street Semiconductor Plant (now ON semiconductor) Phoenix, AZ
- 1956 Sperry Rand Deer Valley Plant (now Honeywell Aerospace) Phoenix, AZ
- 1956 Hotel Valley Ho, Scottsdale, AZ
- 1956 Mountain States Telephone Building, Albuquerque, NM
- 1957 Bisbee High School, Bisbee, AZ
- 1957 Motorola Government and Electronics Building (now General Dynamics) Scottsdale, AZ
- 1957 Central Fire Station, Yuma, AZ
- 1958 Phoenix Fire Station No. 13, Phoenix, AZ
- 1958 General Electric Deer Valley Plant (now Metro North Corporate Park) Phoenix, AZ (significantly altered)
- 1958 Sun Devil Stadium, Tempe, AZ
- 1958 expansion to Hotel Valley Ho, Scottsdale, AZ
- 1958 Lenart Building, 7000 E Camelback Road, Scottsdale, AZ (Demolished)
- 1959 Kofa High School, Yuma, AZ
- 1959-1961 Expansion of Motorola 52nd Street Semiconductor Plant, Phoenix, AZ
- 1960 Cortez High School, Phoenix, AZ
- 1960 Moon Valley Country Club (clubhouse) Phoenix, AZ
- 1960 Kitt Peak Headquarters, Tucson AZ (now National Optical Astronomy Observatory Headquarters) Tucson, AZ
- 1961 Phoenix Country Club (current clubhouse) Phoenix, AZ
- 1961 Scottsdale Fashion Square Phase 1, Scottsdale, AZ (Demolished)
- 1961 US Federal Courthouse, Phoenix, AZ (with Lescher & Mahoney)
- 1961 Sigma Chi Fraternity house Arizona State University, Tempe, AZ (Demolished)
- 1961 Air Reduction Company Motorola Plant, Phoenix, AZ
- 1962 Farmer Education Building Arizona State University, Tempe, AZ
- 1963 Phoenix Municipal Building (now Goode Municipal Building) Phoenix, AZ (with Ralph Haver)
- 1963-1964 Expansion of Motorola Government and Electronics Building, Scottsdale, AZ
- 1964 Emerson Electric Plant (now Sturm, Ruger & Company, Inc) Prescott, AZ
- 1964 Western Savings and Loan, 20th Street and Camelback (later Washburn Piano) Phoenix, AZ (Demolished)
- 1964 Building at 2102 W Indian School, Phoenix, AZ
- 1964 John C. Lincoln Hospital, Sunnyslope, Phoenix, AZ
- 1964 Cochise College, Douglas, AZ

As Varney, Sexton, Sydnor, Associates (1965-1980)

- 1965 Moon Valley High School, Phoenix, AZ
- 1965-1967 Glendale Community College, Glendale, AZ
- 1966 Motorola Integrated Circuit Plant, Mesa, AZ (Demolished)
- 1967 Arizona Bank Branch, Mesa, AZ (Demolished)
- 1967 Dunn-Edwards Paints, Tucson, AZ
- 1968 St Luke's Medical Center, Phoenix, AZ
- 1968 Prescott College, Prescott, AZ
- 1970 Apollo High School, Glendale, AZ
- 1970 Motorola Integrated Circuit Plant Exhaust Towers, Mesa, AZ (Demolished)
- 1971-1973 Expansion of Phoenix Baptist Hospital, Phoenix, AZ
- 1972 Chaparral High School, Scottsdale, AZ
- 1972 Life Sciences Center C-Building, Arizona State University, Tempe, AZ
- 1972 YWCA Building, Glendale, AZ
- 1973 Phoenix Police Department Headquarters, Phoenix, AZ
- 1974 Motorola Price & Elliot Semiconductor Plant, Tempe, AZ
- 1974 Arizona state capitol executive tower, Phoenix, AZ (with Lescher & Mahoney and Place & Place)
- 1975 Expansion of Yuma Regional Medical Center, Yuma AZ
- 1976 Independence High School, Glendale, AZ
- 1977 Maricopa County Central Court Building, Phoenix, AZ
- 1977 Glendale Community College Performing Arts Center, Glendale, AZ
- 1977 Horizon Elementary School, Glendale, AZ
- 1978 Expansion of Memorial Hospital, Phoenix, AZ
- 1978-1982 Arizona State Prison Complex, Tucson, AZ
- 1979 St. Joseph's Hospital parking garage, Phoenix, AZ

As Varney, Sexton, Lunsford, Aye, Associates (1980-1990s)

- 1981 St. Joseph's Hospital expansion, Phoenix, AZ (with Douglas Sydnor)
- 1981-1982 Arizona State Prison Complex, Perryville, AZ
- 1984 Glendale Municipal Building, Glendale, AZ
- 1987 Glendale Foothills Police Station/Fire Station 155, Glendale, AZ
- 1987 St. Joseph's Hospital Outpatient Center, Phoenix, AZ
- 1990 Maricopa County Administration Building, Phoenix, AZ
