= Washington High School (Arizona) =

Public high school in Phoenix, Arizona

Location
- 2217 West Glendale Avenue; Phoenix, Arizona 85021; United States; 33°32′16″N 112°06′24″W

Information
- School type: Public high school
- Motto: Purple Pride - Excellence - Strength - Commitment
- Established: 1955; 71 years ago
- School district: Glendale Union High School District
- Superintendent: Matt Belden
- CEEB code: 030320
- Principal: Jarred Maddox
- Teaching staff: 69.80 (FTE)
- Grades: 9-12
- Enrollment: 1,702 (2023-2024)
- Student to teacher ratio: 24.38
- Colors: Purple and white
- Mascot: Rams
- Rival: Sunnyslope High School
- Newspaper: Rampage
- Yearbook: Panorama
- Feeder schools: Palo Verde Middle School, Royal Palm Middle School, Maryland School, Orangewood School
- Website: Washington High School

Washington High School (commonly Washington or WHS) is a public high school in Phoenix, Arizona, United States. It serves students from grades 9-12. Washington is a part of the Glendale Union High School District, and opened in 1955 with its first graduating class in 1956.

== History ==
Washington was designed by the local architecture firm Edward L. Varney Associates. The construction contract to build the school was awarded to D. O. Norton & Son Construction Co. of Phoenix.

== Academics ==
Washington High School offers multiple Advanced Placement classes, these include Physics, Biology, Calculus AB and BC, English Literature, French, Japanese Language and Culture, Spanish, Studio Art, US Government, US History, Photography, World History and more. It has received the 'Excelling' label by the Arizona Board of Education every year for the past 3 years.

== After school clubs ==
WHS's Interact club is one of the largest and most active Interact clubs in the world. The club does community service activities at least twice a week. It is sponsored by the Sun City Rotary club.

== Notable alumni and staff ==
- 1967 graduate Charlie Hickcox won three 1968 Olympic Gold medals in swimming.
- 1973 graduate Karl Pagel played in MLB for the Chicago Cubs and the Cleveland Indians.
- 1978 graduate Mike Pagel was an All-State quarterback in football. He went on to play the same position at Arizona State University and ultimately in the National Football League. He played for four teams in his 12 NFL seasons.
- 1992 graduate Dr. David Gortler is a former Yale University professor of pharmacology who was appointed by the White House to serve on the Senior Executive Leadership Team at the FDA, with the title "Senior Advisor to The FDA Commissioner."
- 1994 graduate Chester Bennington was an American singer and songwriter best known as the frontman for the rock band Linkin Park.
