= Frank Pollack (American football) =

American football player and coach (born 1967)

Profile
- Position: Offensive line coach/run game coordinator

Personal information
- Born: November 5, 1967 (age 59); Camp Springs, Maryland, U.S.
- Listed height: 6 ft 5 in (1.96 m)
- Listed weight: 285 lb (129 kg)

Career information
- High school: Greenway (Phoenix, Arizona)
- College: Northern Arizona
- NFL draft: 1990: 6th round, 165th overall pick

Career history

Playing
- San Francisco 49ers (1990–1991); Denver Broncos (1992–1993); San Francisco 49ers (1994–1998)

Coaching
- Northern Arizona (2005) Offensive line & tight ends coach; Northern Arizona (2006) Offensive line coach; Houston Texans (2007–2011) Assistant offensive line coach; Oakland Raiders (2012) Offensive line coach; Dallas Cowboys (2013–2014) Assistant offensive line coach; Dallas Cowboys (2015–2017) Offensive line coach; Cincinnati Bengals (2018) Offensive line coach; New York Jets (2019–2020) Offensive line coach; Cincinnati Bengals (2021–2024) Offensive line coach & run game coordinator

Awards and highlights
- Super Bowl champion (XXIX)

Career NFL statistics
- Games played: 90
- Games started: 6
- Stats at Pro Football Reference

Frank Pollack (born November 5, 1967) is an American football former coach and player who was the offensive line coach and run game coordinator for the Cincinnati Bengals of the National Football League (NFL). He was the offensive line coach for the New York Jets (2019–2020), Dallas Cowboys (2015–2017), and Oakland Raiders (2012), and was the assistant offensive line coach for the Cowboys (2013–2014) and the Houston Texans (2007–2011). After five years with the Cowboys, he left in 2018 to join the Bengals for his first stint with them as offensive line coach, for that year only. Paul Alexander replaced Pollack in Dallas. Coincidentally, Alexander had been the offensive line coach for the Bengals since 1994. Pollack played eight seasons in the NFL as offensive tackle and guard for the San Francisco 49ers (1990–1991 and 1994–1997) and Denver Broncos (1992–1993).

== NFL playing career ==
Pre-draft measurables
Height	Weight	Arm length	Hand span	40-yard dash	10-yard split	20-yard split	20-yard shuttle	Vertical jump	Broad jump	Bench press
6 ft 4 5/8 in (1.95 m)	286 lb (130 kg)	30 1/2 in (0.77 m)	9 1/4 in (0.23 m)	5.33 s	1.84 s	3.07 s	4.52 s	24.5 in (0.62 m)	8 ft 2 in (2.49 m)	22 reps
All values from NFL Combine

Frank was a sixth-round pick by San Francisco 49ers out of Northern Arizona in the 1990 NFL Draft. He played in the NFL for eight seasons, playing in 90 games at guard and tackle with the 49ers and the Denver Broncos. In 1994 he won Super Bowl XXIX with the 49ers.
