= Pendergast Elementary School District =

School district in Arizona, United States

The Pendergast Elementary School District is an elementary school district in Phoenix, Arizona. It operates 13 schools in Phoenix, Glendale, and Avondale.

== Elementary schools ==
- Amberlea
- Calderwood
- Canyon Breeze
- Copper King
- Desert Horizon
- Desert Mirage
- Garden Lakes
- Pendergast
- Rio Vista
- Sonoran Sky
- Sunset Ridge
- Villa de Paz
- Westwind
- Pendgast combined Westwind Primary (K–5) and Westwind Intermediate (6–8) into two schools, Westwind Elementary School combining two schools into one for the 2012/2013 school year.
