= Cortez High School =

Public high school in Phoenix, Arizona, US

Location
- 8828 North 31st Avenue; Phoenix, Arizona 85051; United States; 33°34′00″N 112°07′36″W

Information
- Type: Public high school
- Motto: Win The Day
- Established: 1960; 66 years ago
- School district: Glendale Union High School District
- Principal: Brooke Parsons
- Teaching staff: 50.60 (FTE)
- Grades: 9-12
- Enrollment: 1,105 (2023–2024)
- Student to teacher ratio: 21.84
- Colors: Black, White and Red
- Mascot: Calvin the Colt
- Nickname: Colts
- Rival: Washington High School
- Newspaper: The Spectator
- Website: Cortez High School

Cortez High School is located in Phoenix, Arizona at 8828 N 31st Ave, Phoenix, AZ 85051. It is part of the Glendale Union High School District. The mascot is the Colt and the school colors are primarily black and white with red used as an alternate color. In the 2025-2026 school year, U.S. News & World Report's Best High School Ranking list placed Cortez High School as #102 in the state of Arizona and #5,971 in National rankings among approximately 24,000 schools, 18,000 of which are ranked.

== History ==
Cortez was designed by the local architecture firm of Edward L. Varney Associates. Construction of the campus was undertaken by Harmon-Davis Construction Co.

== Athletics ==
Cortez High School participates in 14 different sports as a member of the Arizona Interscholastic Association's 4A Conference.

Sport	State Champions
Football	None
Volleyball (girls)	1985, 1986, 1988
Badminton	None
Spiritline	None
Golf	None
Swim and Dive	None
Cross Country	1968, 1969
Basketball (boys)	None
Basketball (girls)	None
Soccer (boys)	2010, 2012, 2013
Soccer (girls)	None
Wrestling	None
Baseball	1963
Softball	None
Track and Field	None
Tennis (boys)	1962
Tennis (girls)	1962, 1963

== Notable alumni ==
- Glen Buxton - musician
- Brian Davis – American football player
- Duffy Dyer – professional baseball player
- Kevin Wickander – professional baseball player
- Vincent Furnier, better known as Alice Cooper – musician
- Dennis Dunaway - musician
- Greg Stanton – politician
- Dennis Gile – American football player
- Bill Brotherton – politician
- Paul Penzone – law enforcement
- Sean Bonnette – musician
- Patty Duffek - model and actress
