= Sunnyslope High School =

Public school in Phoenix, Arizona

Location
- 35 West Dunlap Avenue; Phoenix, Arizona 85021; United States; 33°34′01″N 112°04′33″W

Information
- Type: Public School
- Opened: 1953; 73 years ago
- School district: Glendale Union High School District
- Teaching staff: 93.60 (FTE)
- Grades: 9-12
- Enrollment: 2,270 (2023–2024)
- Student to teacher ratio: 24.25
- Colors: Green and white
- Nickname: Vikings
- Website: Sunnyslope High School

Sunnyslope High School is in the Glendale Union High School District in Phoenix, Arizona and offers courses for grades 9–12. It first opened in 1953.

== Description ==
Sunnyslope was designed by the local architecture firm Edward L. Varney Associates. The construction contract to build the school was awarded to Farmer & Godfrey Construction Co. After funds were approved in 2020, major construction updates to the campus have been ongoing, led by the architecture firm Orcutt Winslow and the general contractor McCarthy Building Companies.

== Athletics ==
=== Recent titles ===
The boys' basketball team won its first state championship in 2002 and its second in 2009, and was the runner-up in 2010, 2016, and 2023. In 2017 and 2018, the boys' basketball team won back-to-back 5A titles under coach Ray Portela. Additionally, the volleyball team won titles in 2017, 2014, 2013, 2011, 2010, 2009, 2008, and 2006. The boys' and girls' swim teams won titles in 2005, with the boys' winning again in 2006. Sunnyslope's girls' badminton team won the 4A state title in 2009 and the 5A title in 2016, and was runner-up in 2010.

== Awards and recognition ==
Sunnyslope High School has been given the "Excelling" status by Arizona in accordance with the No Child Left Behind Act for eight consecutive years. Sunnyslope was also named a top high school by the U.S. News & World Report.

== Notable alumni and staff ==
- 2001 graduate David Redkey is a 2026 Green Candidate for Arizona's 3rd Congressional District.
- 2003 graduate Todd Golden led the Florida Gators to win the NCAA Men's 2024/2025 SEC and NCAA tournaments.

== See also ==
- Sunnyslope Mountain – Mountain in Phoenix, Arizona
