= Glendale Elementary School District =

School district in Arizona, United States

Address
- 7301 North 58th Avenue Glendale, Arizona, 85301; United States

District information
- Type: Public
- Grades: PreK–8
- NCES District ID: 0403420

Students and staff
- Students: 10,453
- Teachers: 561.0
- Staff: 696.85
- Student–teacher ratio: 18.63

Other information
- Website: www.gesd40.org

The Glendale Elementary School District is an elementary school district for Glendale, Arizona. It operates 17 schools in grades K-8 and serves about 13,000 students.

The district includes a central portion of Glendale and small pieces of unincorporated areas.

== Schools ==
K-8/PK-8 schools

- Bicentennial South School
- Glenn F. Burton School
- Challenger School
- Desert Spirit School
- Discovery School
- Glendale American School
- Glendale Landmark K-8 School
- Horizon School
- Don Mensendick School
- Harold W. Smith School
- Sunset Vista School
- William C. Jack School

Online K-8

- Glendale Elementary Online Learning

Other

- GESD System of Care Center
