= Glendale, Arizona =

City in Arizona, United States

Glendale
- City
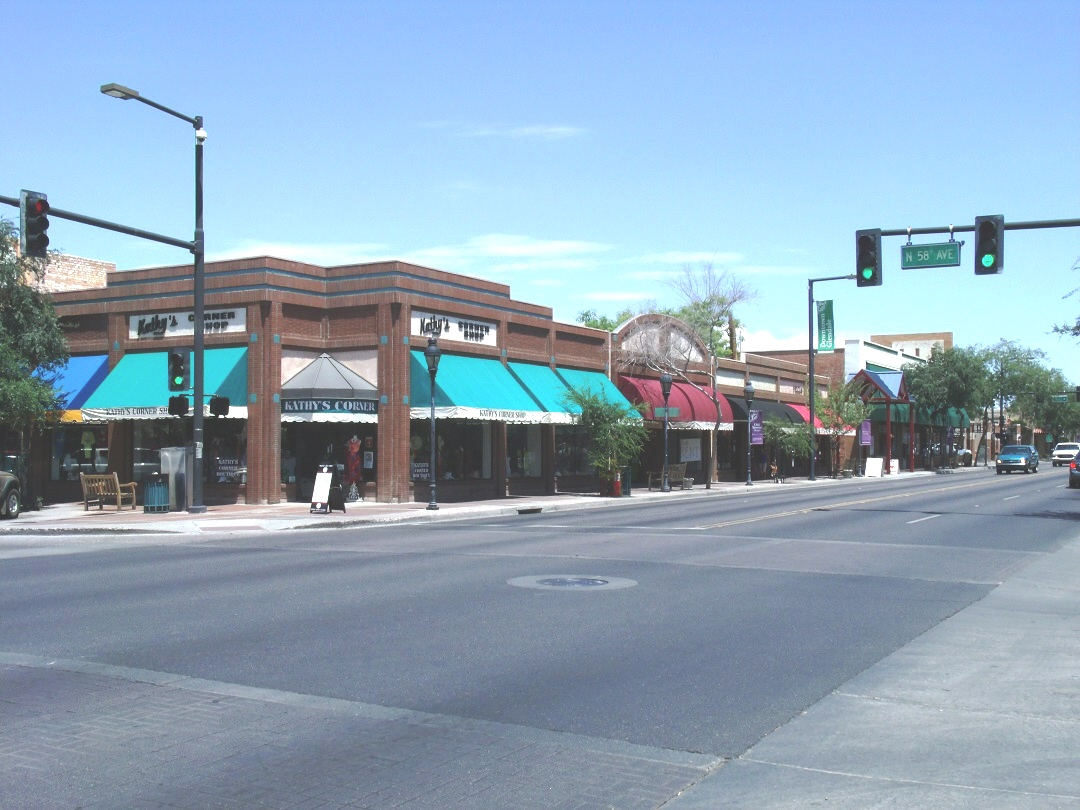
- Downtown Glendale

- Flag Logo

- Location in Maricopa County, Arizona

- Location within Arizona Location within the United States Location within North America
- Coordinates: 33°32′19″N 112°11′11″W
- Country: United States
- State: Arizona
- County: Maricopa
- Founder: William John Murphy

Government
  - Mayor: Jerry Weiers (Non-Partisan)
  - Vice mayor: Jamie Aldama

Area
  - Total: 65.09 sq mi (168.59 km^{2})
  - Land: 64.68 sq mi (167.53 km^{2})
  - Water: 0.41 sq mi (1.06 km^{2})
- Elevation: 1,152 ft (351 m)

Population (2020)
  - Total: 248,325
  - Estimate (2025): 260,572 ▲
  - Rank: US: 89th
  - Density: 3,839/sq mi (1,482.3/km^{2})
- Demonym: Glendalian
- Time zone: UTC−7 (MST (no DST))
- ZIP code: 85301–85312 & 85318
- Area codes: 602, 480, 623
- FIPS code: 04-27820
- GNIS feature ID: 5060
- Website: www.glendaleaz.gov

Glendale (/ˈɡlɛndeɪl/) is a city in Maricopa County, Arizona, United States. Bordering the state capital, as a suburb of Phoenix, Glendale is known for State Farm Stadium, which is the home of the Arizona Cardinals football team. The city also contains the Arrowhead Towne Center shopping mall. As of the 2020 census, Glendale had a population of 248,325.

== History ==
In the late 1800s the area that is now Glendale was all desert. William John Murphy, a native of New Hartford, New York, who resided in the town of Flagstaff in what was then the territory of Arizona, was in charge of building the 40-mile-long (64 km) Arizona Canal from Granite Reef to New River for the Arizona Canal Company. In 1885, he completed the canal, which would bring water to the desert land. Murphy was deep in debt, since he had agreed to be paid in Arizona Canal Company stock and bonds and land instead of cash.

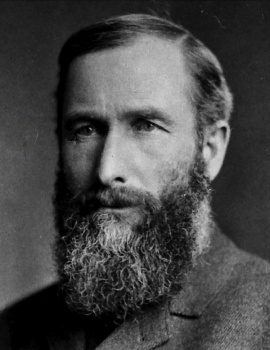
William John Murphy – founder of Glendale

In 1887, Murphy formed the Arizona Improvement Company. His objective was to sell the land and water rights south of the canal. Murphy raised capital from out of state sources in order to meet payroll and construction expenses. Murphy decided to refer to this land as "Glendale". In order to develop and interest potential investors and settlers in this new town, Murphy decided to provide a better way of access from Phoenix to Glendale and ending in the town of Peoria by building an 18-mile-long (29 km) diagonal road which he named Grand Avenue.

In 1891, Burgess Hadsell worked with Murphy to bring 70 Brethren and River Brethren families to Glendale to form a temperance colony. Soon settlers, attracted by the town's ban on alcoholic beverages, continued to arrive. In 1895, Murphy platted the original town site and amended the plat to include a town park and some business lots. It was bounded by Lamar Road on the south, 55th Avenue on the east, Myrtle Avenue on the north, and 59th Avenue on the west. The construction of a railroad from Prescott to Phoenix was made possible with an exchange of the right-of-way made by Murphy along Grand Avenue. The railroad allowed Glendale settlers to transport goods to the north and easily receive building materials.

The construction and commercial applications of the Beet Sugar Factory in 1906 also contributed to the growth of Glendale. Though the operations of the factory only lasted until 1913, it played an important role in the increase of immigrant and migrant settlers in the city. Several other businesses were founded around this time such as Glendale Ice Company, Pacific Creamery Company, Glendale Milling Company, and Southwest Flour and Feed.

World War I ushered in a renewal for Glendale, with cotton prices rising throughout the period. Cotton continues to be a source of economic prosperity in Glendale with many farms still along the Loop 101, despite many farmers switching to more profitable crops. A high demand for food also kept farmers busy. Numerous farms and orchards were established and thrived through the early 1900s.

World War II brought the birth of Thunderbird Field to train civilian pilots for the Army. In late 1940, a few Hollywood actors and businessmen, headed by Leland Hayward, approached the Army to establish a primary flight training school. This group chose the site of Thunderbird Field primarily because of its abundance of space, excellent weather, and good visibility. While this field was being built in 1941, the Army was busy working on a larger base for $4.5 million, Luke Field (now Luke Air Force Base). This base was named for the first pilot to receive a Medal of Honor, Lt. Frank Luke Jr. Thunderbird Field would later become the Thunderbird American Graduate School for International Management.

The military and college presence, as well as the increase in population (nearly doubling between 1950 and 1960), sparked a need for utilities, parks, schools and streets. Over the next 40 years, the city added a landfill, water treatment plant, sewage plants, libraries, parks, public safety facilities, an airport, a city hall and a civic center. In the 1970s, Glendale practiced strip annexation to claim future territory to annex that another city couldn't claim. Current strip borders are along Northern Avenue, Peoria Avenue, Perryville Road, and Camelback Road.

Arrowhead Towne Center opened in 1993, and the surrounding neighborhood, Arrowhead Ranch, made the area a hotspot for housing and shopping. The completion of Loop 101 throughout Glendale opened the city to the rest of the Valley.

In recent decades, the city has begun major investment into tourism. The establishment of the Westgate Entertainment District, housing Desert Diamond Arena, and State Farm Stadium in the early 2000s made Glendale a destination for locals and visitors. Construction of the VAI Resort and Mattel Adventure Park will continue to grow Glendale's tourism economy creating hundreds of new jobs and providing more than a thousand new hotel rooms for the city. The completion of Loop 303 in 2011 also resulted in an increase in industrial development.

In 2024, the city called on the Department of Defense to lobby for Arizona Governor Katie Hobbs to veto bipartisan legislation to increase housing supply in Arizona. Ryan Lee, the city's intergovernmental-programs director, confirmed to Jerusalem Demsas of The Atlantic that he was behind the move but refused to otherwise comment. Demsas speculated the Department of Defense was "doing a favor for a NIMBY local government" due to Luke Air Force Base being located nearby. State Representative Analise Ortiz, whose district includes parts of Glendale, criticized the city for going behind legislators' back to lobby against the legislation, "This is not the way we typically go about creating policy."

== Geography ==
According to the United States Census Bureau, the city has a total area of 65.1 square miles (169 km^{2}), of which 0.4 square miles (1.0 km^{2}), or 0.63%, is water. The New River and Agua Fria River flow southward through the western extremities of the city.

=== Climate ===
Glendale has a hot desert climate (Köppen: BWh) typical of Southern Arizona, with very hot and dry summers and mild winters.

Climate data for Phoenix Int'l, Arizona (1991–2020 normals, (Note: Mean monthly maxima and minima (i.e. the highest and lowest temperature readings during an entire month or year) calculated based on data at said location from 1991 to 2020.) extremes 1895–present) (Note: Official records for Phoenix kept at downtown August 1895 to September 1953, and at Sky Harbor Int'l since October 1953. For more information see ThreadEx.)
Month	Jan	Feb	Mar	Apr	May	Jun	Jul	Aug	Sep	Oct	Nov	Dec	Year
Record high °F (°C)	88 (31)	92 (33)	105 (41)	105 (41)	114 (46)	122 (50)	121 (49)	118 (48)	117 (47)	113 (45)	99 (37)	88 (31)	122 (50)
Mean maximum °F (°C)	78.2 (25.7)	82.1 (27.8)	90.4 (32.4)	99.0 (37.2)	105.7 (40.9)	112.7 (44.8)	114.6 (45.9)	113.2 (45.1)	108.9 (42.7)	100.7 (38.2)	88.9 (31.6)	77.7 (25.4)	115.7 (46.5)
Mean daily maximum °F (°C)	67.6 (19.8)	70.8 (21.6)	78.1 (25.6)	85.5 (29.7)	94.5 (34.7)	104.2 (40.1)	106.5 (41.4)	105.1 (40.6)	100.4 (38.0)	89.2 (31.8)	76.5 (24.7)	66.2 (19.0)	87.1 (30.6)
Daily mean °F (°C)	56.8 (13.8)	59.9 (15.5)	66.3 (19.1)	73.2 (22.9)	82.0 (27.8)	91.4 (33.0)	95.5 (35.3)	94.4 (34.7)	89.2 (31.8)	77.4 (25.2)	65.1 (18.4)	55.8 (13.2)	75.6 (24.2)
Mean daily minimum °F (°C)	46.0 (7.8)	49.0 (9.4)	54.5 (12.5)	60.8 (16.0)	69.5 (20.8)	78.6 (25.9)	84.5 (29.2)	83.6 (28.7)	78.1 (25.6)	65.6 (18.7)	53.7 (12.1)	45.3 (7.4)	64.1 (17.8)
Mean minimum °F (°C)	36.0 (2.2)	40.0 (4.4)	44.4 (6.9)	50.1 (10.1)	58.4 (14.7)	69.4 (20.8)	74.4 (23.6)	74.2 (23.4)	68.3 (20.2)	53.8 (12.1)	42.0 (5.6)	35.4 (1.9)	33.8 (1.0)
Record low °F (°C)	16 (−9)	24 (−4)	25 (−4)	35 (2)	39 (4)	49 (9)	63 (17)	58 (14)	47 (8)	34 (1)	27 (−3)	22 (−6)	16 (−9)
Average precipitation inches (mm)	0.87 (22)	0.87 (22)	0.83 (21)	0.22 (5.6)	0.13 (3.3)	0.02 (0.51)	0.91 (23)	0.93 (24)	0.57 (14)	0.56 (14)	0.57 (14)	0.74 (19)	7.22 (183)
Average precipitation days (≥ 0.01 in)	3.8	4.1	3.1	1.5	1.0	0.5	3.9	4.6	2.5	2.2	2.2	4.0	33.4
Average relative humidity (%)	50.9	44.4	39.3	27.8	21.9	19.4	31.6	36.2	35.6	36.9	43.8	51.8	36.6
Average dew point °F (°C)	32.4 (0.2)	32.2 (0.1)	32.9 (0.5)	31.6 (−0.2)	34.3 (1.3)	39.0 (3.9)	56.1 (13.4)	58.3 (14.6)	52.3 (11.3)	43.0 (6.1)	35.8 (2.1)	33.1 (0.6)	40.1 (4.5)
Mean monthly sunshine hours	256.0	257.2	318.4	353.6	401.0	407.8	378.5	360.8	328.6	308.9	256.0	244.8	3,871.6
Percentage possible sunshine	81	84	86	90	93	95	86	87	89	88	82	79	87
Average ultraviolet index	3.1	4.4	6.6	8.5	9.7	10.9	11.0	10.1	8.3	5.6	3.7	2.7	7.0
Source 1: NOAA (dew points, relative humidity, and sun 1961–1990), Weather.com
Source 2: UV Index Today (1995 to 2022)

== Demographics ==
Historical population
Census	Pop.	Note	%±
1910	1,000		—
1920	2,737		173.7%
1930	3,665		33.9%
1940	4,855		32.5%
1950	8,179		68.5%
1960	15,893		94.3%
1970	36,228		127.9%
1980	97,172		168.2%
1990	147,864		52.2%
2000	218,812		48.0%
2010	226,721		3.6%
2020	248,325		9.5%
2025 (est.)	260,572	▲	4.9%
U.S. Decennial Census

Glendale, Arizona – Racial and ethnic composition Note: the US Census treats Hispanic/Latino as an ethnic category. This table excludes Latinos from the racial categories and assigns them to a separate category. Hispanics/Latinos may be of any race.
Race / Ethnicity (NH = Non-Hispanic)	Pop 2000	Pop 2010	Pop 2020	% 2000	% 2010	% 2020
White alone (NH)	141,462	116,866	107,695	64.65%	51.55%	43.37%
Black or African American alone (NH)	9,818	12,766	17,872	4.49%	5.63%	7.20%
Native American or Alaska Native alone (NH)	2,460	2,707	3,030	1.12%	1.19%	1.22%
Asian alone (NH)	5,860	8,618	11,272	2.68%	3.80%	4.54%
Pacific Islander alone (NH)	230	355	492	0.11%	0.16%	0.20%
Other race alone (NH)	289	329	1,171	0.13%	0.15%	0.47%
Mixed race or Multiracial (NH)	4,350	4,579	9,176	1.99%	2.02%	3.70%
Hispanic or Latino (any race)	54,343	80,501	97,617	24.84%	35.51%	39.31%
Total	218,812	226,721	248,325	100.00%	100.00%	100.00%

=== 2020 census ===
The 2020 United States census counted 248,325 people, 86,483 households, and 59,565 families in Glendale. The population density was 4,031.5 per square mile (1,556.6/km^{2}). There were 91,912 housing units at an average density of 1,492.2 per square mile (576.1/km^{2}). The racial makeup was 51.14% (126,983) white or European American (43.37% non-Hispanic white), 7.66% (19,027) black or African-American, 2.01% (5,003) Native American or Alaska Native, 4.69% (11,639) Asian, 0.23% (574) Pacific Islander or Native Hawaiian, 18.59% (46,153) from other races, and 15.68% (38,946) from two or more races. Hispanic or Latino of any race was 39.31% (97,617) of the population.

Of the 86,483 households, 35.8% had children under the age of 18; 43.9% were married couples living together; 27.9% had a female householder with no spouse or partner present. 23.5% of households consisted of individuals and 8.5% had someone living alone who was 65 years of age or older. The average household size was 3.0 and the average family size was 3.6. The percent of those with a bachelor's degree or higher was estimated to be 14.8% of the population.

25.3% of the population was under the age of 18, 11.0% from 18 to 24, 26.5% from 25 to 44, 24.0% from 45 to 64, and 13.2% who were 65 years of age or older. The median age was 34.5 years. For every 100 females, there were 104.2 males. For every 100 females ages 18 and older, there were 106.7 males.

The 2016-2020 5-year American Community Survey estimates show that the median household income was $56,991 (with a margin of error of +/- $1,677). The median family income was $65,763 (+/- $1,945). Males had a median income of $36,152 (+/- $1,047) versus $28,175 (+/- $1,327) for females. The median income for those above 16 years old was $31,982 (+/- $609). Approximately, 12.7% of families and 17.2% of the population were below the poverty line, including 26.1% of those under the age of 18 and 12.6% of those ages 65 or over.

=== 2010 census ===
As of the census of 2010, there were 226,710 people, 79,114 households, and 54,721 families residing in the city. The population density was 3,929.5 inhabitants per square mile (1,517.2/km^{2}). There were 79,667 housing units at an average density of 1,430.7 per square mile (552.4/km^{2}). The racial makeup of the city was 75.54% White, 6% Black or African American, 1.7% Native American, 3.9% Asian, 0.2% Pacific Islander, 16.95% from other races, and 4.0% from two or more races. 35.5% of the population was Hispanic or Latino of any race.

There were 79,114 households, out of which 39.9% had children under the age of 18 living with them, 53.5% were married couples living together, 12.8% had a female householder with no husband present, and 28.2% were non-families. 21.3% of all households were made up of individuals, and 5.8% had someone living alone who was 65 years of age or older. The average household size was 2.85 and the average family size was 3.33.

In the city, 30.1% of the population was under the age of 18, 10.8% was from 18 to 24, 31.9% from 25 to 44, 19.9% from 45 to 64, and 7.4% was 65 years of age or older. The median age was 31 years. For every 100 females, there were 99.6 males. For every 100 females age 18 and over, there were 97.1 males.

The median income for a household in the city was $45,015, and the median income for a family was $51,162. Males had a median income of $35,901 versus $27,736 for females. The per capita income for the city was $19,124. About 8.8% of families and 11.9% of the population were below the poverty line, including 15.3% of those under age 18 and 9.5% of those age 65 or over.

== Economy ==
=== Top employers ===
#	Employer	# of Employees
1	Luke Air Force Base	5,100
2	Banner Health	3,000
3	Arrowhead Towne Center	2,650
4	Walmart	2,175
5	Glendale Union High School District	1,974
6	Glendale Community College	1,948
7	The City of Glendale	1,693
8	Deer Valley Unified School District	1,594
9	Glendale Elementary School District	1,400
10	Tanger Outlets	1,200

Source: AZCentral.com

== Arts and culture ==
=== Attractions ===
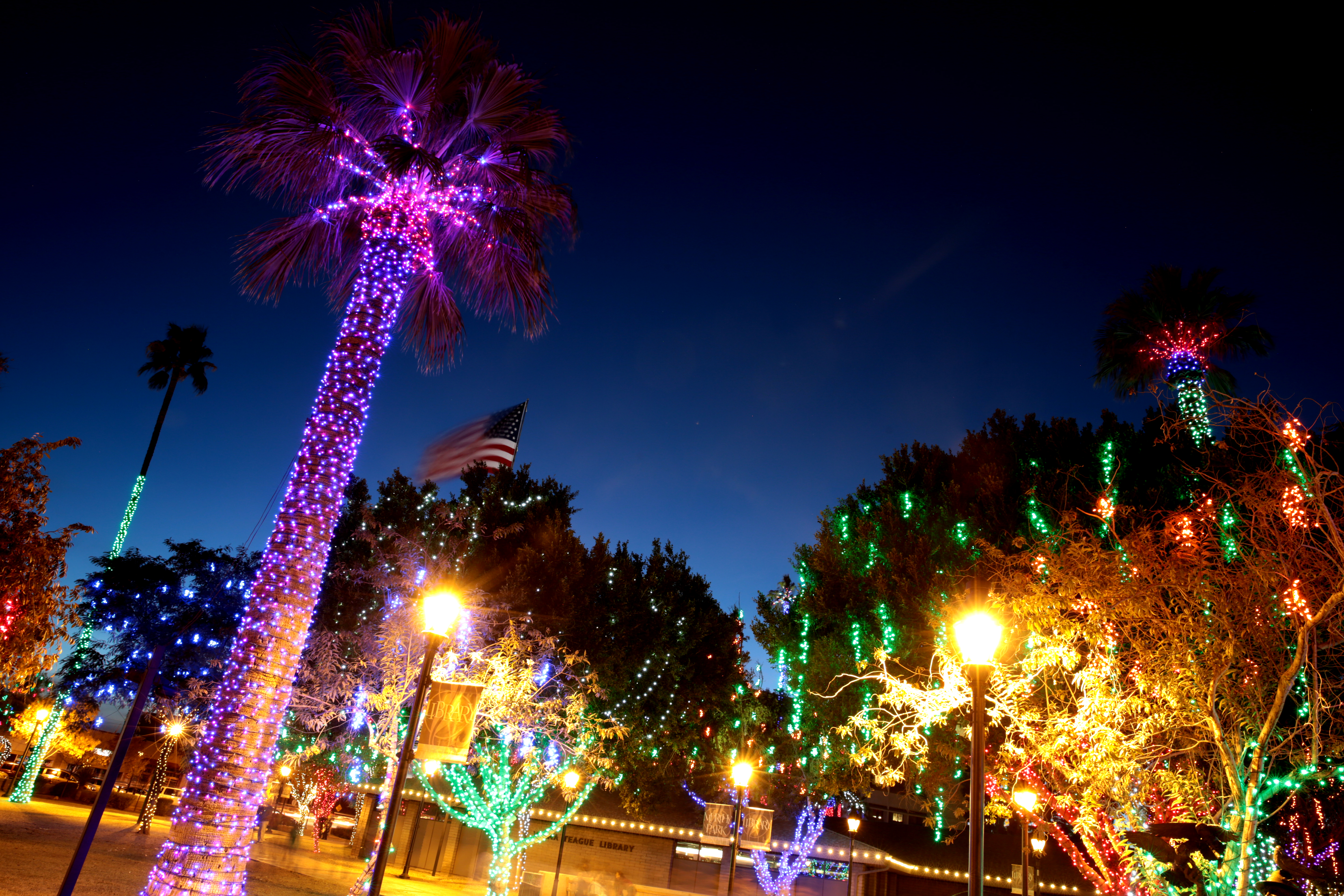
Downtown Glendale with Glendale Glitters around Christmas

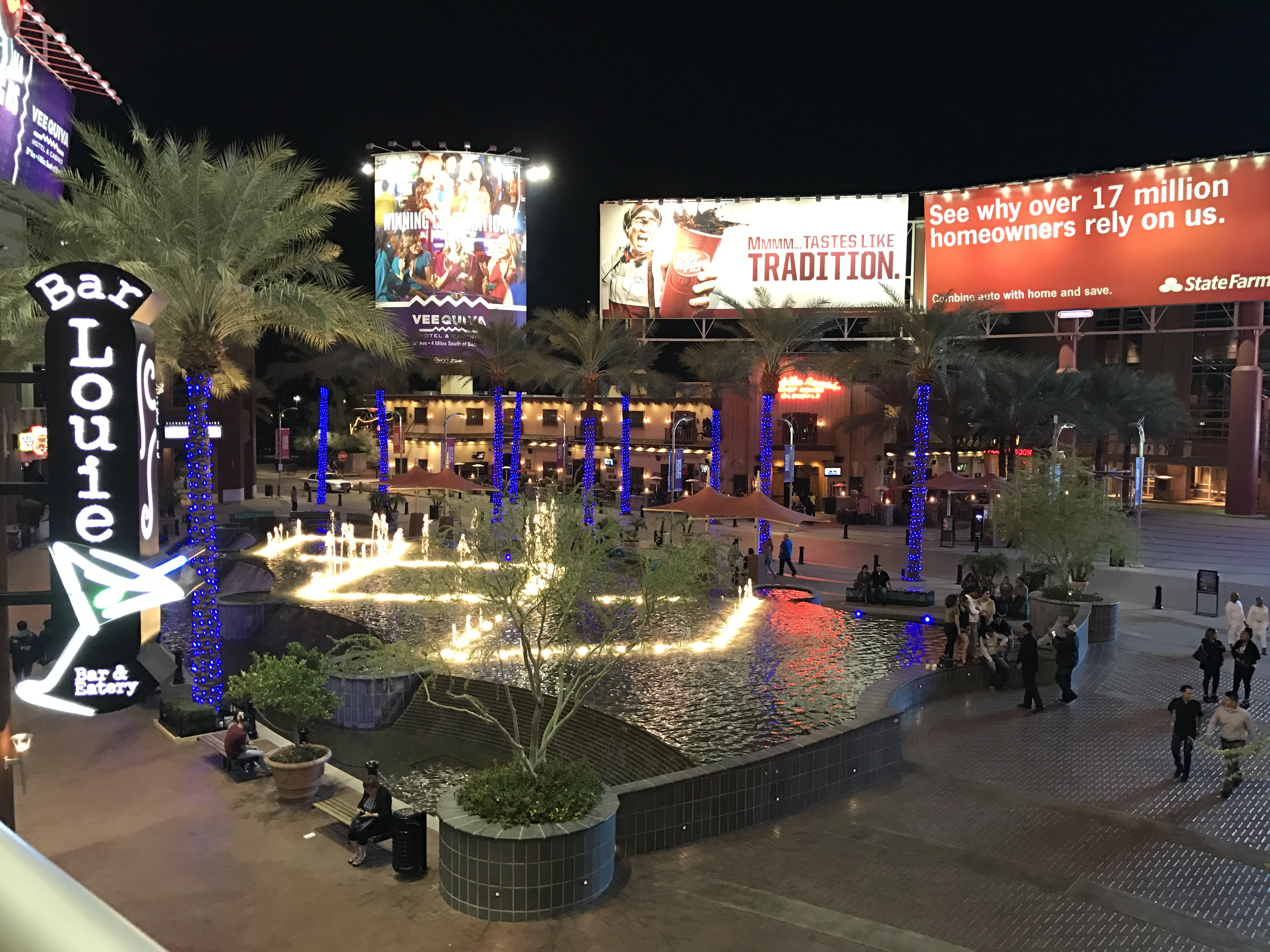
The fountain area of the Westgate Entertainment District

- Adobe Mountain Desert Park
- Cerreta Candy Co. factory tour
- Camelback Ranch
- Elsie McCarthy Sensory Garden
- Desert Diamond Arena
- Glendale Chocolate Festival (every February)
- Glendale Folk & Heritage Festival
- Glendale Glitters (every December)
- Glendale Jazz and Blues Festival
- Manistee Ranch
- Mattel Adventure Park (opening 2027)
- Sahuaro Ranch
- State Farm Stadium
- Westgate Entertainment District

=== Shopping ===
Glendale is noted for its retail sales of antiques.

The Arrowhead Towne Center mall is located here.

=== Concerts ===
Glendale was temporarily renamed as Swift City on March 17 and 18, 2023, as per the mayor and the city council's proclamation, to celebrate the opening concerts of the Eras Tour, the sixth concert tour by American singer-songwriter Taylor Swift, at State Farm Stadium. The Westgate Entertainment District, a mixed-use complex in the city, additionally put up welcoming messages, with the local restaurants offering Swift-themed menu items. State Farm also hosted the Super Bowl LVII halftime show, headlined by Barbadian singer Rihanna, shortly before the tour.

== Sports ==
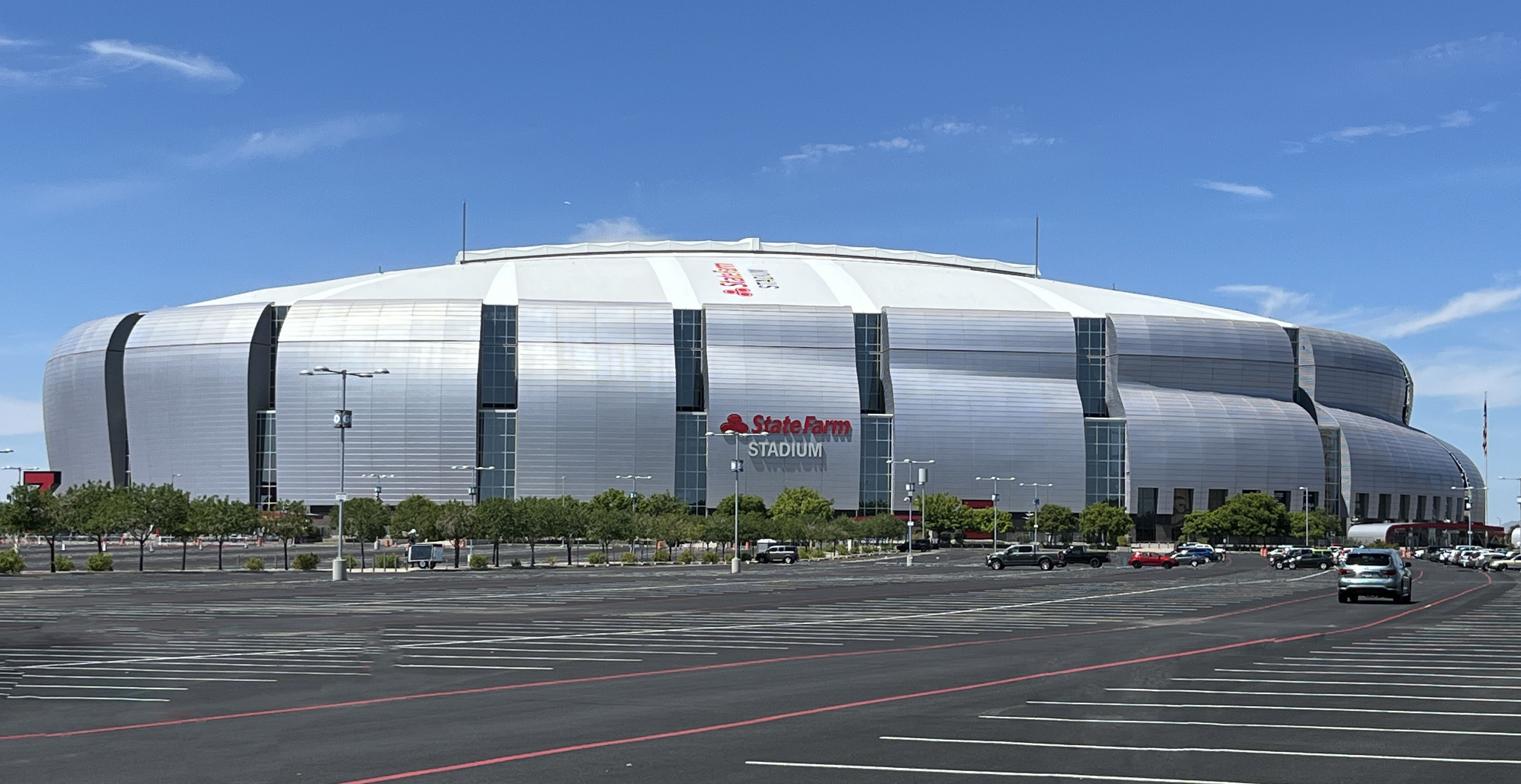
State Farm Stadium

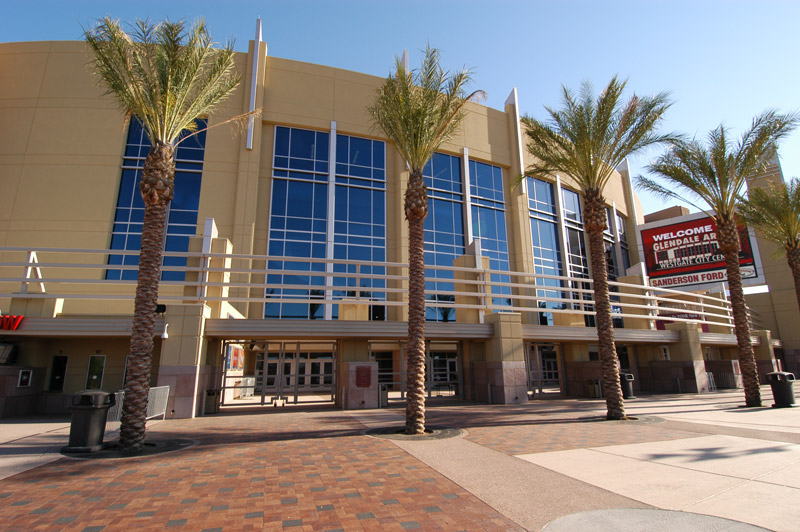
Desert Diamond Arena

Glendale is the site of two major sports venues: State Farm Stadium and Desert Diamond Arena. Both venues are part of the Glendale Sports and Entertainment District development plan, meant to spur growth in the sparsely inhabited Yucca district. Both venues are owned by the City of Glendale.

State Farm Stadium has been the home field of the Arizona Cardinals in the National Football League since 2006, and the annual Fiesta Bowl college football game since 2007. Both the Cardinals and bowl game moved from Mountain America Stadium on the Arizona State University campus in Tempe. Since opening, the facility has hosted three Super Bowls, three college football national championship games, the NCAA Men's Basketball Final Four, WrestleMania XXVI and International Champions Cup soccer to Glendale. Designed by architect Peter Eisenman, the stadium was featured on The History Channel TV series, Modern Marvels because of its roll-out natural grass field.

Desert Diamond Arena (formerly Glendale Arena, then Jobing.com Arena and Gila River Arena) and Westgate Entertainment District is adjacent to State Farm Stadium, and was the home of the Arizona Coyotes of the National Hockey League (NHL). It was also the home of the now defunct Arizona Sting of the National Lacrosse League (NLL). The inaugural Street League Skateboarding event was held in the summer of 2010 in Glendale at the Gila River Arena. This street skateboarding competition returns to Glendale annually. Currently, the arena hosts the Arizona Rattlers of the Indoor Football League.

In 2009, the Los Angeles Dodgers and the Chicago White Sox of Major League Baseball began to share the new Camelback Ranch-Glendale spring training complex and stadium in Glendale owned and operated by the City of Glendale.

== Education ==
There are a number of higher education campuses in Glendale. Glendale Community College and Glendale Community College North, just across the border in northwestern Phoenix, are members of the Maricopa County Community College District. Arizona State University's Thunderbird School of Global Management was founded in Glendale at Thunderbird Field after World War II and recently relocated its campus to the downtown location of ASU after joining the university as an independent unit dedicated to international business education. West campus is just across the border from Glendale in west Phoenix. Midwestern University is a graduate college of medicine located in Glendale.

Many school districts serve the city of Glendale. The following school districts serve the city:

Unified school districts

- Deer Valley Unified School District
- Dysart Unified School District
- Peoria Unified School District (headquartered in Glendale)

High school districts

- Glendale Union High School District
- Agua Fria Union High School District
- Phoenix Union High School District
- Tolleson Union High School District

Elementary school districts

- Alhambra Elementary School District
- Glendale Elementary School District
- Litchfield Elementary School District
- Pendergast Elementary School District
- Washington Elementary School District

Grace Lutheran School is a Pre-K-8 Christian school of the Wisconsin Evangelical Lutheran Synod (WELS) in Glendale.

New Gains Academy is a grade 5-12 Microschool in Glendale. with academics, business entrepreneurship, piano, voice, dance and art programs.

Our Lady of Perpetual Help Catholic School is a Pre-K-8 Catholic school of the Roman Catholic Diocese of Phoenix in Glendale.

Arrowhead Christian Academy is a K-12 Christian school associated with Northwest Valley Baptist Church in Glendale.

== Infrastructure ==
=== Transportation ===
The city of Glendale has a roughly average percentage of households without a car. In 2015, 8.4 percent of Glendale households lacked a car, and increased slightly to 9 percent in 2016. The national average was 8.7 percent in 2016. Glendale averaged 1.72 cars per household in 2016, compared to a national average of 1.8.

Glendale Municipal Airport serves the city but it does not offer commercial air services. The closest commercial airport is Phoenix Sky Harbor International Airport, located about 30 minutes away by car.

==== Highways ====
- Loop 101 (Agua Fria Freeway)
- Loop 303 (Estrella Freeway)
- Northern Parkway (Northern Freeway)
- US-60 (Grand Avenue)

=== Utilities ===
Glendale operates its own drinking water system for most of the town. EPCOR operates the water utility in the Loop 303 area. Electricity is provided by Arizona Public Service and Salt River Project.

The city of Glendale operates irrigation water in the historic area and some adjacent areas. Salt River Project provides irrigation to other areas east of the New River.

== Notable people ==
- Prince Amukamara, professional football player
- Eddie Bonine, professional baseball player
- Elijah Burke, professional wrestler
- Danny Cruz, professional soccer player
- Nick Evans, professional baseball player
- Trent Franks, former United States congressman
- Lauren Froderman, winner of So You Think You Can Dance (Season 7)
- Jennie Garth, actress
- Claire Kretzschmar, ballet dancer, choreographer, and former ballet soloist
- Paul LoDuca, professional baseball player
- Craig Mabbitt, lead vocalist of band Escape the Fate
- Michael McDowell, NASCAR driver
- Evan Mecham, former Arizona governor
- Lou Novikoff, professional baseball player
- Jonathan Ornelas, baseball player
- Sterling Ridge, Arizona legislator
- Marty Robbins, Grammy-winning country musician and auto racer
- Nate Ruess, lead singer of Fun
- Tage Thompson, NHL player
- Rickson van Hees, American soccer player
- Jason Zumwalt, actor

== Sister cities ==
Glendale has two sister cities:

- – Ørland, Norway
- – Memmingen, Germany

== See also ==
- List of historic properties in Glendale, Arizona
- USS Arizona salvaged artifacts
- List of people from Phoenix
- Glendale Memorial Park Cemetery
