= Washington Elementary School District =

School district in Arizona, United States

The Washington Elementary School District provides education for more than 25,300 students in the southern part of North Phoenix (including the North Mountain urban village area) in Phoenix and east Glendale areas of Arizona. With 32 schools, WESD is the largest elementary school district in Arizona.

Gifted Services are offered at all schools, with approximately 1,660 students being challenged beyond the traditional classroom setting, including two self-contained programs that serve highly gifted students. Title I services, which offer supplemental education for identified students in need of additional assistance, are provided at 20 schools.

The district's attendance rate matches the state average at 95 percent. WESD's per-pupil spending is $6,554, compared to the Arizona average of $6,556.

WESD's Superintendent is Dr. Lupita Hightower (July 2026, Dr. Michael Robert). The five-member governing board includes president Kate McGee, vice president Bev Kraft, and members Bill Adams, Tee Lambert, and Chris Maza. The district's office is located at 4650 W. Sweetwater, Glendale, Arizona, 85304.

== K-6 schools ==
- Acacia Elementary
- Alta Vista Elementary
- Arroyo Elementary
- Cactus Wren Elementary
- Chaparral Elementary
- Desert View Elementary
- Ironwood Elementary
- John Jacobs Elementary
- Lookout Mountain Elementary
- Lakeview Elementary
- Manzanita Elementary
- Moon Mountain Elementary
- Ocotillo Elementary
- Richard E. Miller Elementary
- Roadrunner Elementary
- Sahuaro Elementary
- Shaw Butte Elementary
- Sunburst Elementary
- Sunset Elementary
- Tumbleweed Elementary
- Washington Elementary

== Middle schools ==
- Cholla Middle School - grades 7–8
- Desert Foothills Junior High
- Mountain Sky Junior High
- Palo Verde Middle School
- Royal Palm Middle School

== K-7/K-8 schools ==
- Abraham Lincoln Traditional
- Maryland Elementary
- Orangewood Elementary
- Sunnyslope Elementary
- Sweetwater School
- Mountain View Elementary
