= List of historic properties in Glendale, Arizona =

- City
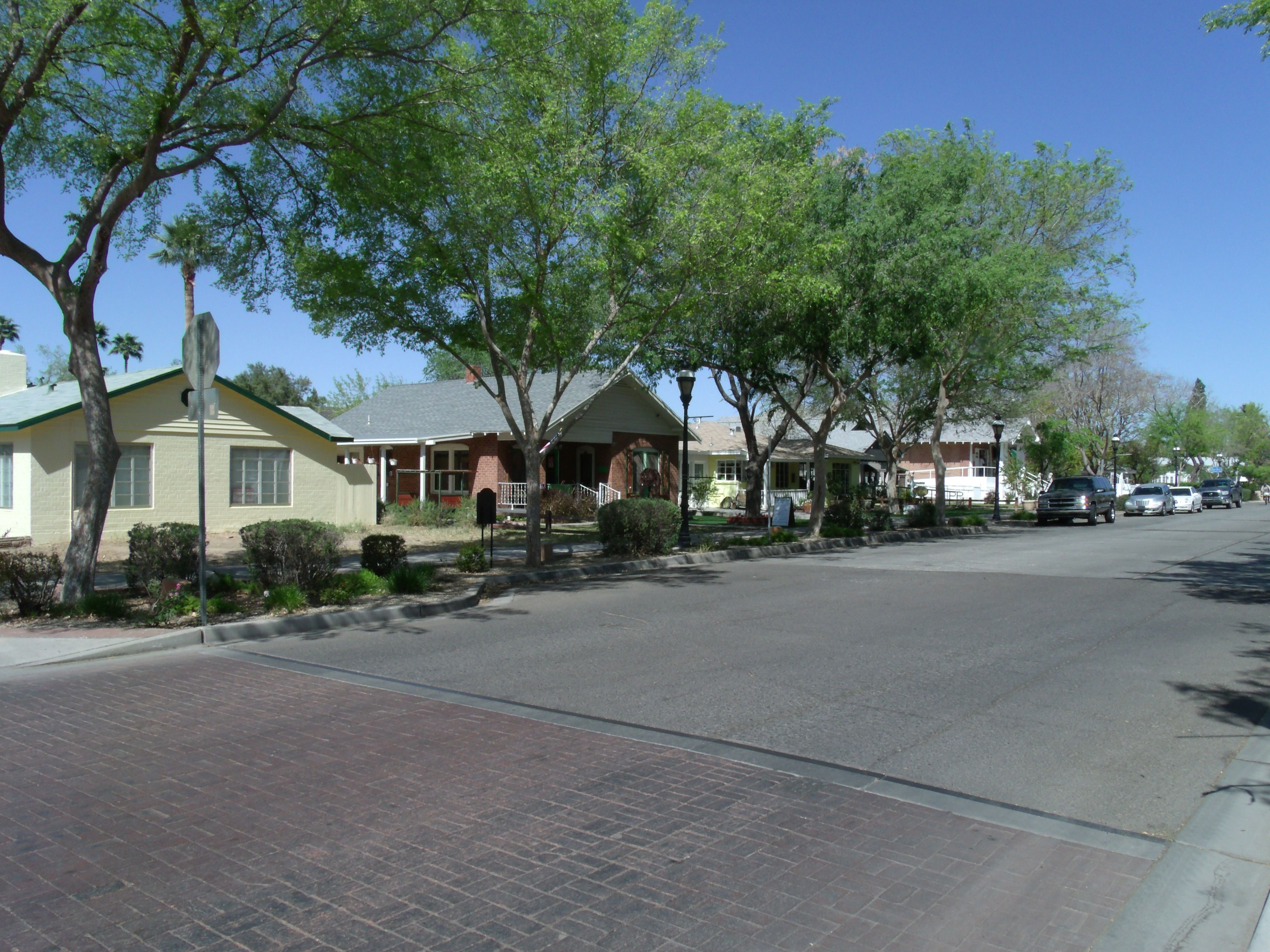
- View of 58th Dr. of historic Catlin Court District established in 1914

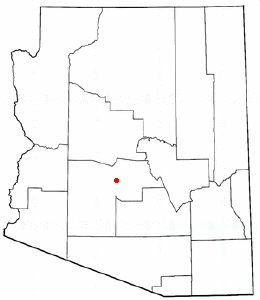
- Location in Maricopa County and the state of Arizona

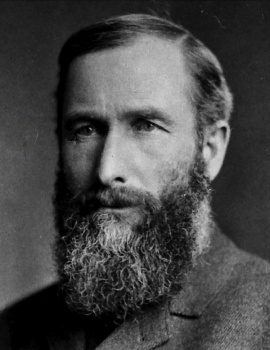
William John Murphy c. 1905

This is a list of historic properties in Glendale, Arizona, which includes a photographic gallery, of some of the city's remaining historic structures and monuments.

== Brief history ==
The town of Glendale, was founded by William John Murphy in 1892. The establishment of a Santa Fe railroad link to Phoenix in 1895 allowed Glendale to blossom into the largest town in the northwest Salt River Valley. The city was incorporated as a town in 1910 and is currently the 4th largest city in Arizona.

The city has 20 listings on the National Register of Historic Places, which includes ten historic neighborhood districts. The first of these districts to be placed on the register is that of the Glendale townsite-Catlin Court Historic District. The other nine historic neighborhood districts are:

- The 59th Avenue Residential Historic District
- Floralcroft Historic District
- Glendale Gardens Historic District
- Glendale Tract Historic District
- Northfield Historic District
- Myrtle Avenue Residential Historic District
- Sage Acres Historic District
- Sands Estate Historic District
- The Thunderbird Estates
- The McDonald Addition Historic District

Additionally, a number of properties which are considered historical by the Glendale Historic Society and the Glendale List of Historic Places Survey are listed here with a brief description and image.

Also included in this list are the images of the airfield control tower (which has been restored), barracks, and one large airplane hangar of what once was Thunderbird 1 Army Air Field. The airfield, where the Thunderbird School of Global Management is currently located, was a military airfield in Glendale that was used for contract primary flight training of Allied pilots during World War II.

=== The Sahuaro Ranch fire ===
On Monday, September 25, 2017, the blacksmith shop, built prior to 1927, and the granary building, built prior to 1927 and addition 1935 burned to the ground and days before that the milk house 1932 burned to the ground at historic Sahuaro Ranch. This is a terrible loss of important historical assets for the community. The park was closed on September 26, 2017, to allow for an investigation of the fires. The park has open up on September 27, 2017. The Glendale Arizona Historical Society stands ready to help and assist the City of Glendale in the investigation, rebuilding and remembrance of these historical resources.

== Buildings ==
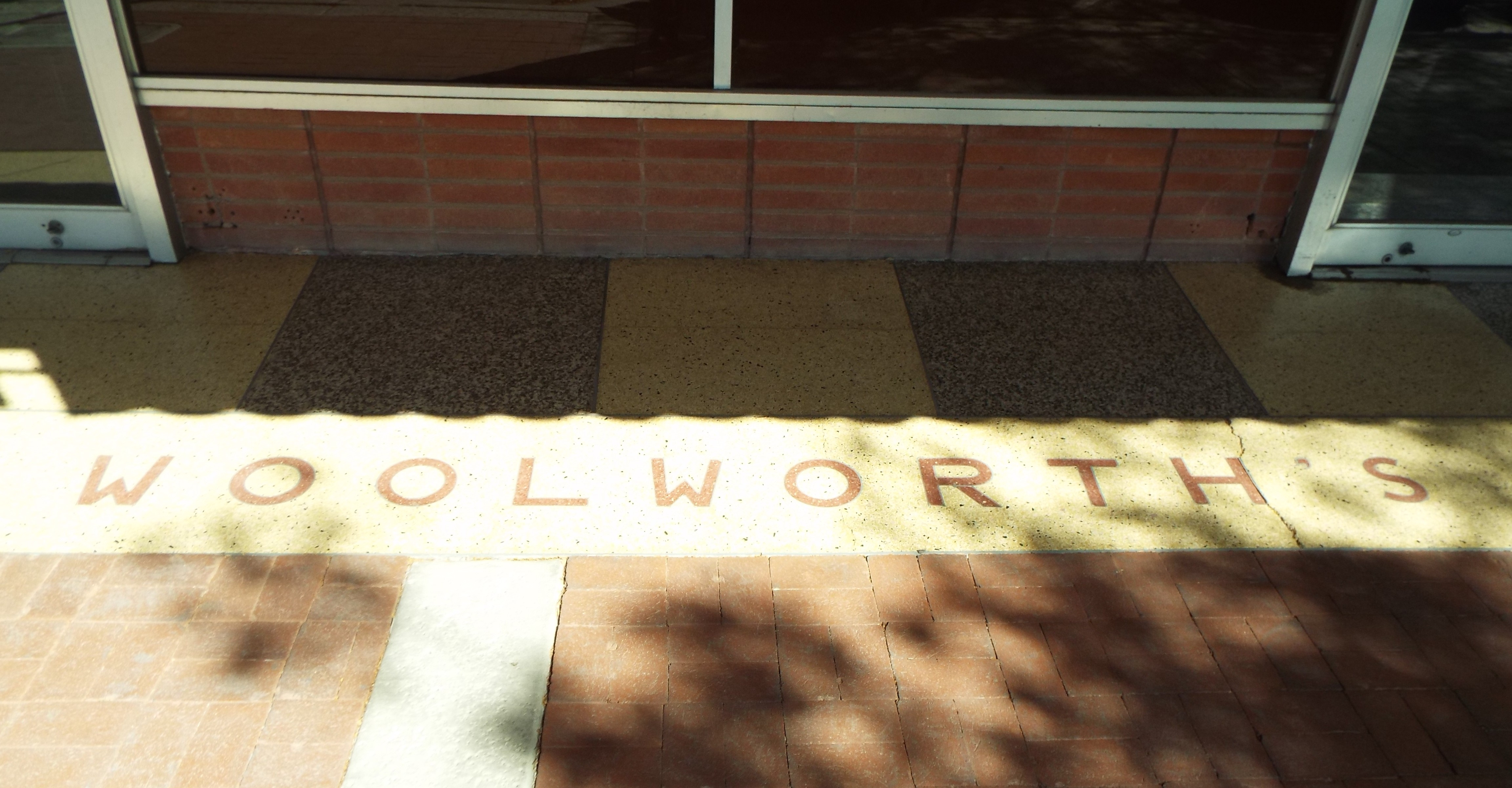
Old Woolworth's in Glendale

The following is a brief description of the historic buildings in Glendale which are pictured. These structures have been designated as historical by the National Register of Historic Places and/or the Glendale Arizona Historical Society.

- The Santa Fe Railroad Depot It was built in 1895. – The building serves as the offices of BNSF-MOW (Burlington Northern Santa Fe – Maintenance of Way). It is listed in the Glendale Arizona Historical Society.
- The Humphrey and Davidson Building It was built in 1895. – It is the second oldest brick commercial building in Glendale.
- The Glendale Memorial Park Cemetery Caretakers’ House – It was built in 1895 and is located inside the Glendale Memorial Park Cemetery at 7844 N. 61st Ave. The Memorial Park Cemetery is Glendale's first cemetery.
- Glendale Blacksmith Shop – This building was built in the late 19th century. It is located in 6713 N. 57th Drive. Renovations were made to the building and it now houses the Desert Rose Cigar Lounge & Club.
- The Beet Sugar Factory Building – It was built in 1906. The one million dollar Beet Sugar Factory was built by the Arizona Sugar Company, founded by William John Murphy. It produced sugar until 1913. The building is listed in the National register of Historic Places.
- The Boiler and lime kiln house and repair shop of the Beet Sugar Factory. – The building is listed in the National register of Historic Places.
- The Hoghe Bunkhouse – Located at the intersection of Lamar Road and North 53rd Avenue. It was built by Leo M. Hoghe in 1906. The Hoghe Bunkhouse is the only remaining example of workers housing associated with the Beet Sugar Factory in Glendale.
- The Beet Sugar Factory Warehouses – It was built in 1906.
- The First National Bank of Glendale – It was built in 1906.
- The C. L. Gillett Building – The building once housed the Glendale State Bank. It was built in 1909.
- Glendale's first mortuary – It was built in 1912 and is located at 6821 N 58th Ave, now serves as the American Legions Post 29 Bingo Hall.
- Glendale's first Fire Station – This was the location of Glendale's first Fire Station in N. 57th Drive. The structure was built in 1912. It was later used as the towns’ municipal court and is now occupied by the Glendale Information Technology.
- The Glendale Woman's Club – The structure was built in 1912.
- The Sine Brothers Hardware Store – built in 1912.
- The Hine Building – It was built in 1913 and now houses various businesses.
- The Two Story Adobe Market/House – The structure was built in 1918 and is located at 6738 N. 54th Drive. The main floor served as a grocery store, while the second floor was used as the family living quarters. It is the largest adobe building in Glendale.
- The Robert W. Cole Building The building once housed the Sprouse and Reitz 5 and 10 Cent Store. It was built in 1919. The building now houses "Zola Bell's", an antique store.
- The Landmark Middle School – built in 1920 and located at 5730 W Myrtle Ave in Glendale, Arizona
- The Glendale Grammar School One-Room Class Building – It was built in 1920. This particular unit is known as "Room 35". It is listed in the National Register of Historic Places.
- The Glendale Herald and Valley Printers Building – It was built in 1920. The structure is located at 5430 Glendale Ave. The "Glendale Herald" began operations in 1926 and continued to do so until 1963, when it ceased to operate. It was the towns’ second newspaper and started as the “Saturday Shopper”. The building now houses a used car sales business.
- El Rey Theatre – This building was once the “El Rey Theatre”. It was built in the 1920s and is located at 7009 N. 58th Ave. The theatre is now gone, however the structure houses (2013) the Pink House Boutique.
- The Sine Building – This structure was built in 1926 by Floyd Sine. The first floor originally housed the Glendale Furniture Co. and the second floor was used as a meeting space.
- The Glendale Welding Company Building – It was built in the early 1900s and is located at 6725 N 57th Dr. The welding company was established in 1937 and claims to be Glendale's oldest business in one location.
- The Glendale Tract Community Center – It was built in 1937 and is located at the axial terminus of Sands Road on a large parcel that occupies the Southeast corner of the historic Glendale Tract District. The district was listed in the National Register of Historic Places on January 11, 2006, reference #05001506.
- Filers Bakery – The bakery was founded in 1939. It was established in the Robert W. Cole building, built in 1919, which once housed the Sprouse and Reitz 5 and 10 Cent Store.
- The Glendale High School Auditorium – It was built in 1939.
- The Coury Building – It was built in 1940.
- Old Woolworth's Building built c. 1950 and located on 57th Dr.
- The Glendale Pharmacy – Located at 5625 W Glendale Ave., was built in the 1940s. It once housed the Glendale Pharmacy and the Glendale Post Office before that. (notice the old pharmacy sign on top of the building). It now houses Auntie Em's Miniature and Smilin' Jack's Pedal Car store.
- The Joe's Market – It was built in 1942 and located at 6705 N. 54th Ave.. Once used as a grocery store.
- Basha's Supermarket – This historic structure, built in 1951 and located at 5734 W Glendale Ave., once housed Basha's Supermarket. The school offices of Glendale school district were once located in the second floor of the building. It was also once the home of The Mad Hatters Antique Store.
- The Pratt's Feed and Supply original building – Emerson Wilcken Pratt (1901–2001) worked here when it was known as the "Farmers Cooperative". Pratt's brought the business and in 1953 established Pratt's Feed and Supply. The structure is located at Glendale and 52 Aves. In the background is a mill which Emerson Wilcken Pratt had built to mix different feeds. The building is now used for other business ventures. The property is listed in the Glendale Historic Building Survey, City of Glendale, 1980.
- The Pratt Mill.
- The original Fire Station #151 – Glendale's first modern fire Station, built in 1960 and located at 55th Ave. and Orangewood Ave. A new, modern fire station, replacing this one, was built in 6851 N. 52nd Avenue.
- The Cerreta Candy Co. – founded in 1968 in Glendale, Arizona. In 2002 was named a West Valley Treasure. It was originally built as a Safeway grocery store.
- The "Northwest Hospital" original building – located at 61st and Northern Aves. Eventually the hospital was moved to a new location at 5555 W. Thunderbird Road in 1983 and was renamed "Banner Thunderbird Medical Center". The building was built in 1960 and now houses the "Salvation Army Corps Community Center".
Historical buildings in Glendale, Arizona

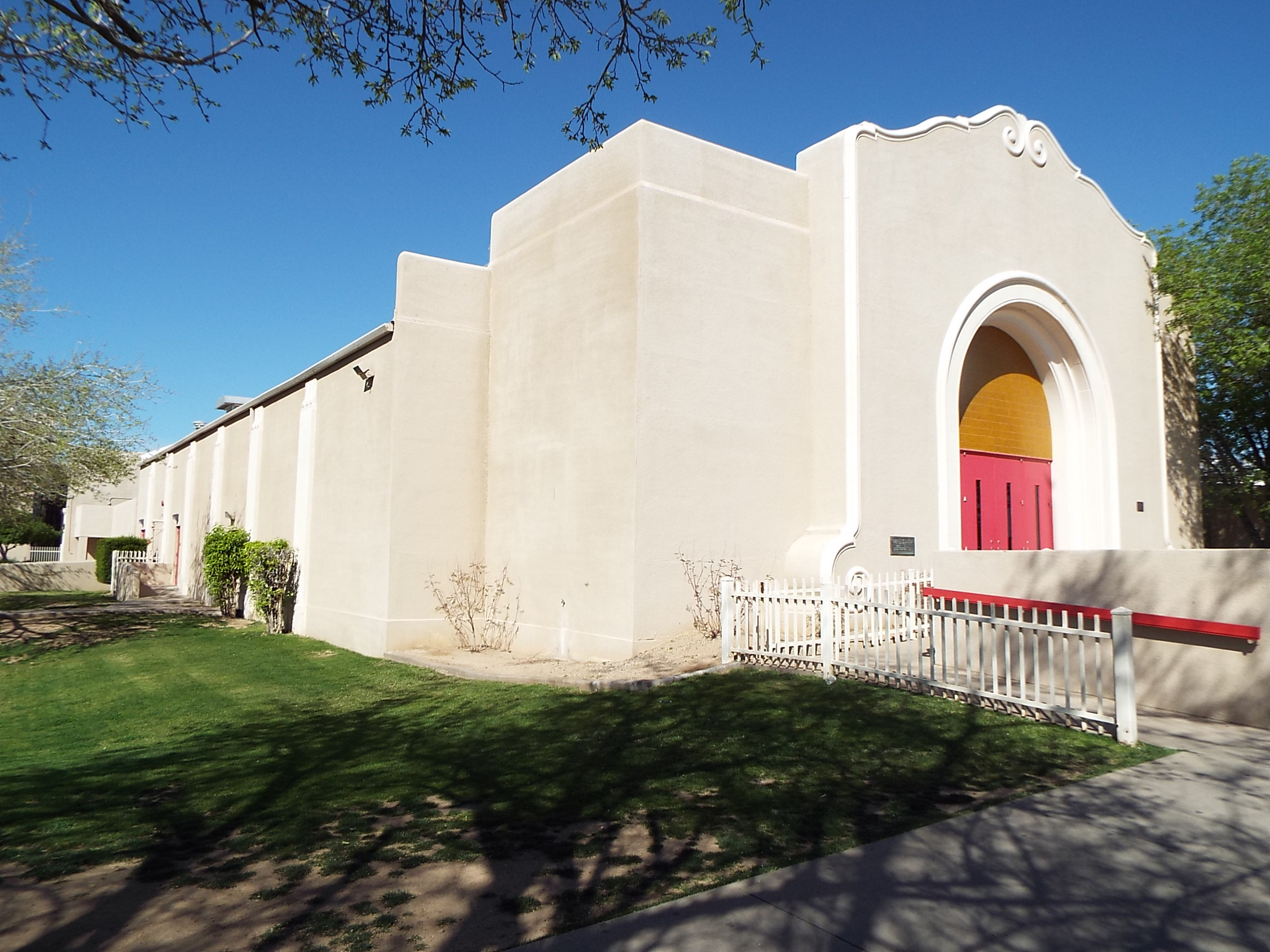
The Glendale High School Auditorium built in 1930. This is part of the original high school building.

(NRHP = National Register of Historic Places)
(GAHS=Glendale Arizona Historical Society)
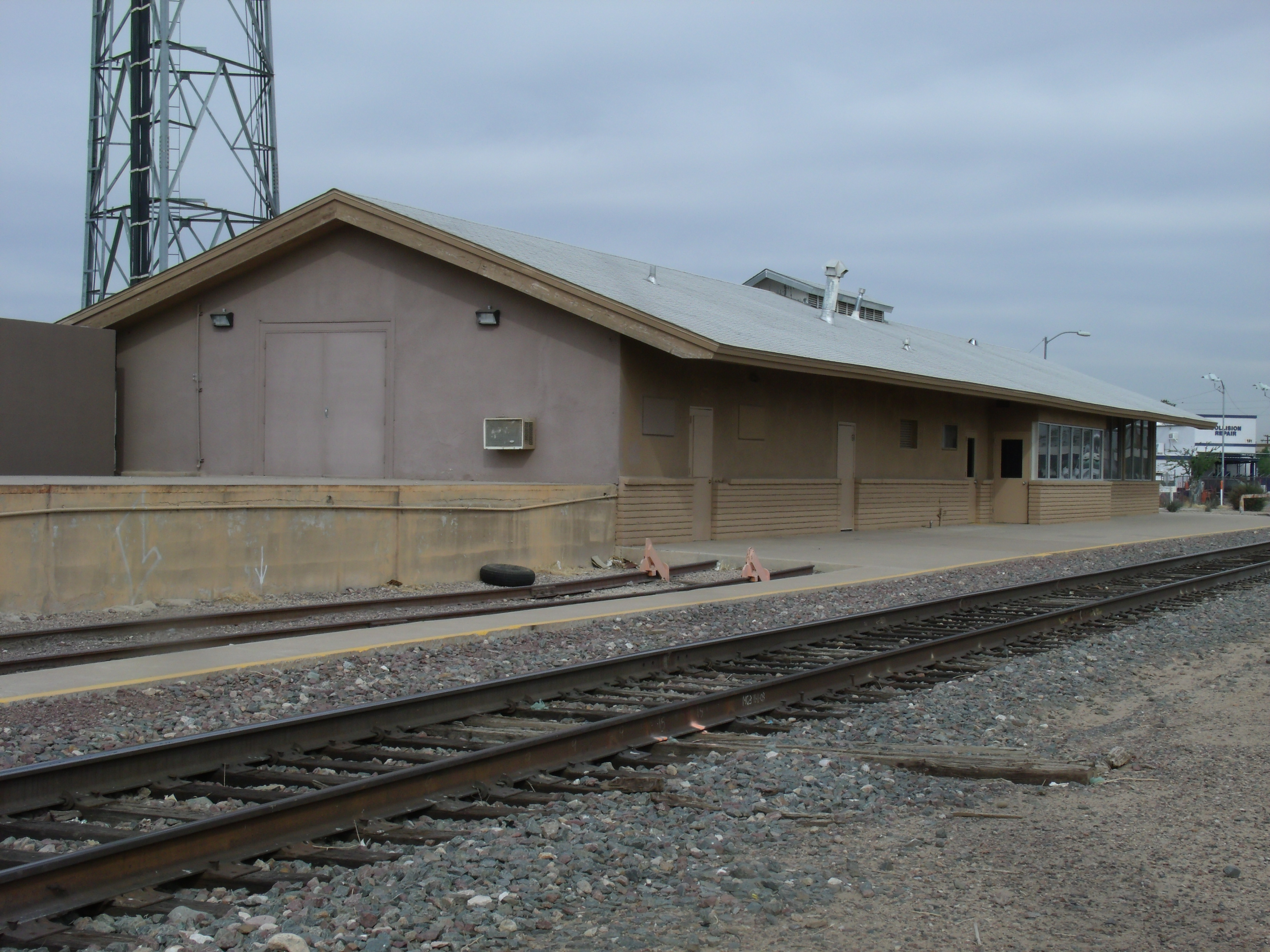
The Santa Fe Railroad Depot

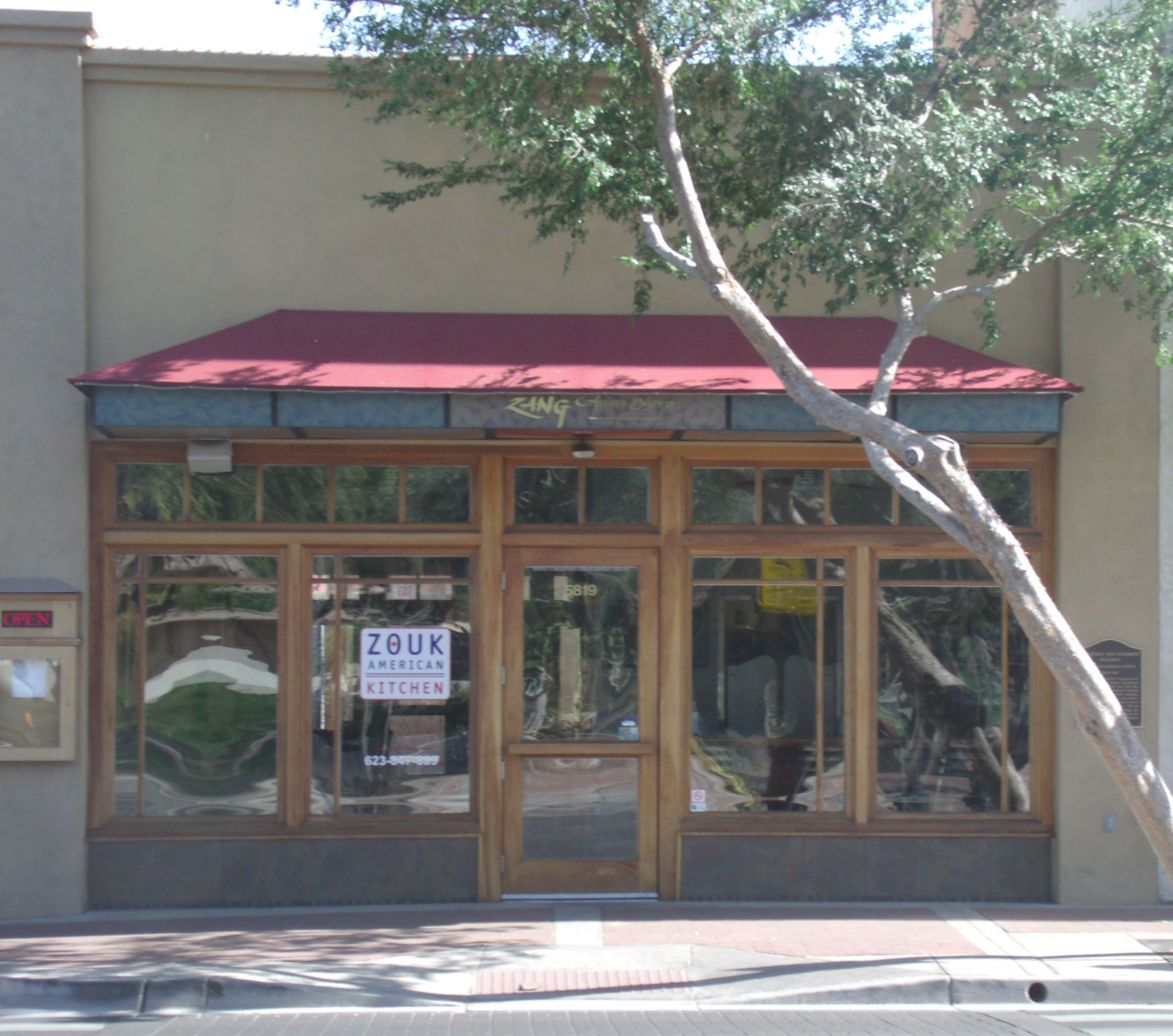
The Humphrey and Davidson Building

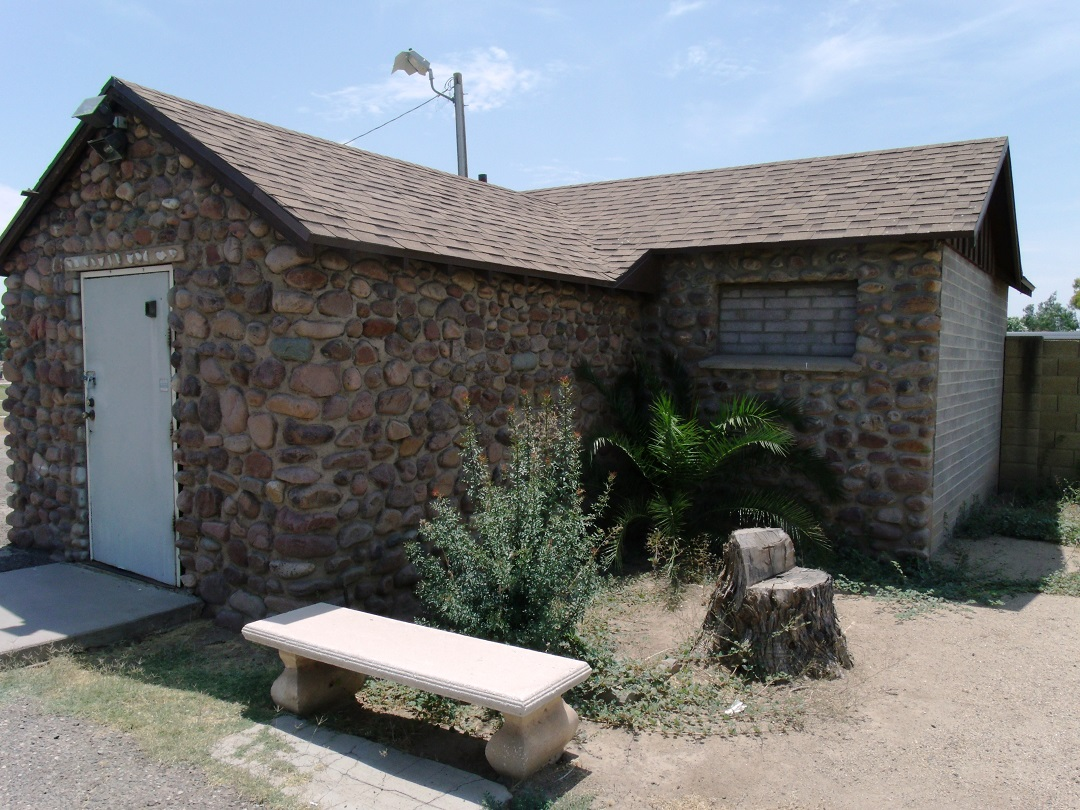
The Glendale Memorial Park Cemetery Caretakers’ House

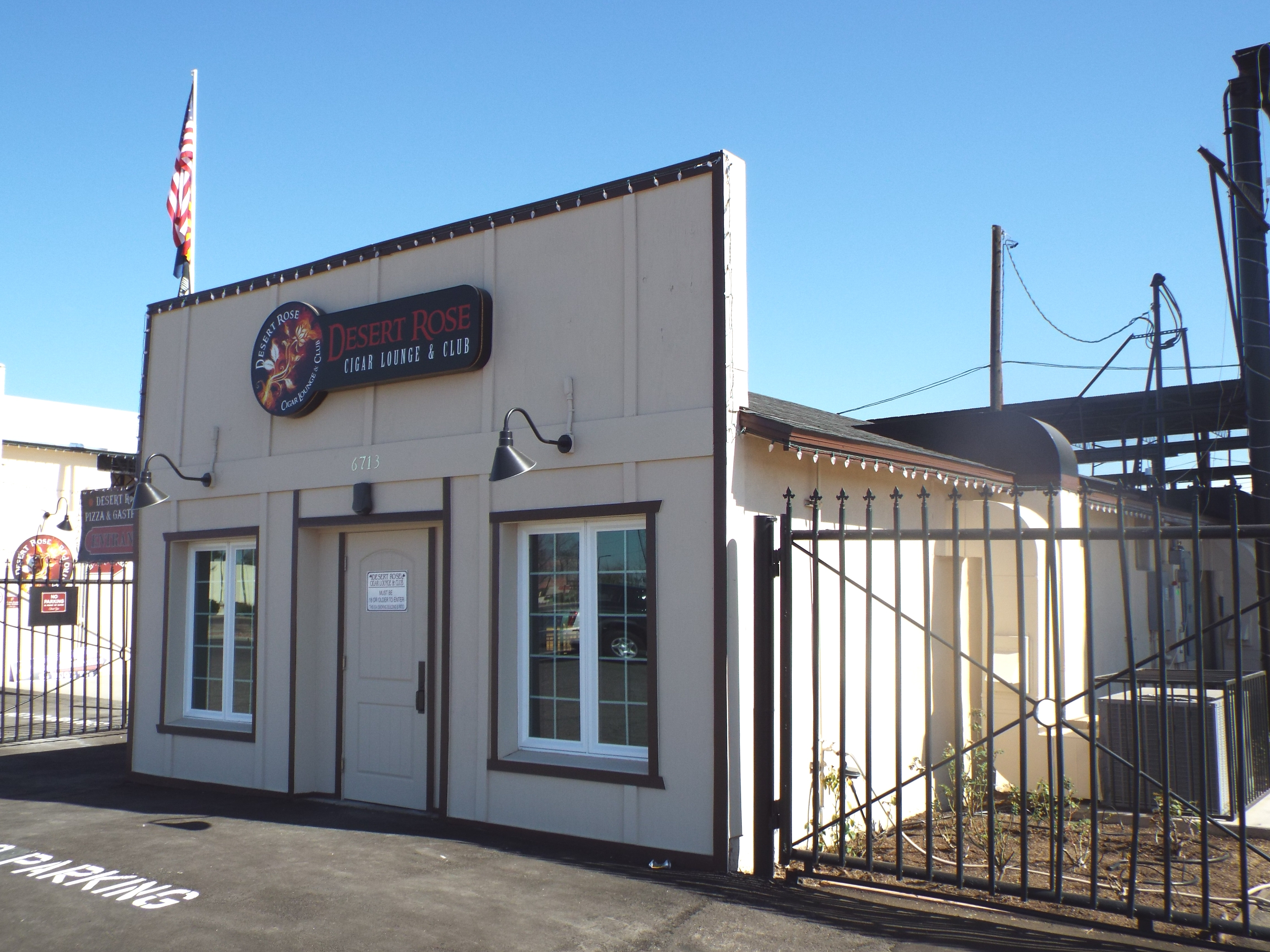
The Glendale Blacksmith Shop

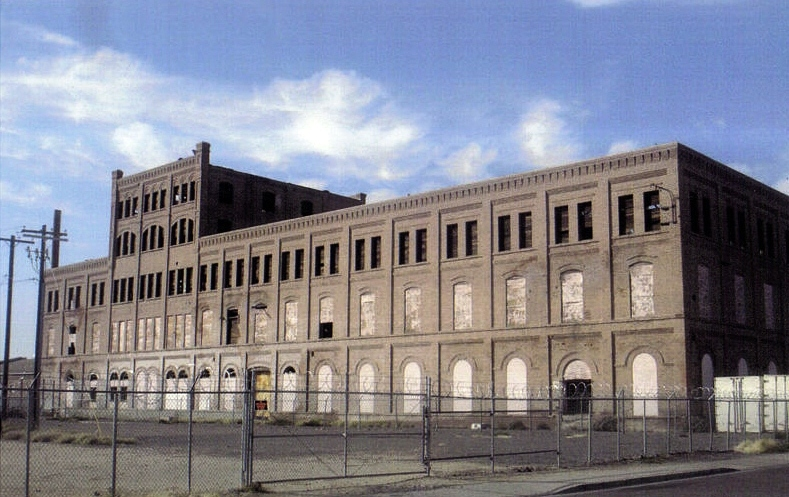
The Beet Sugar Factory Building

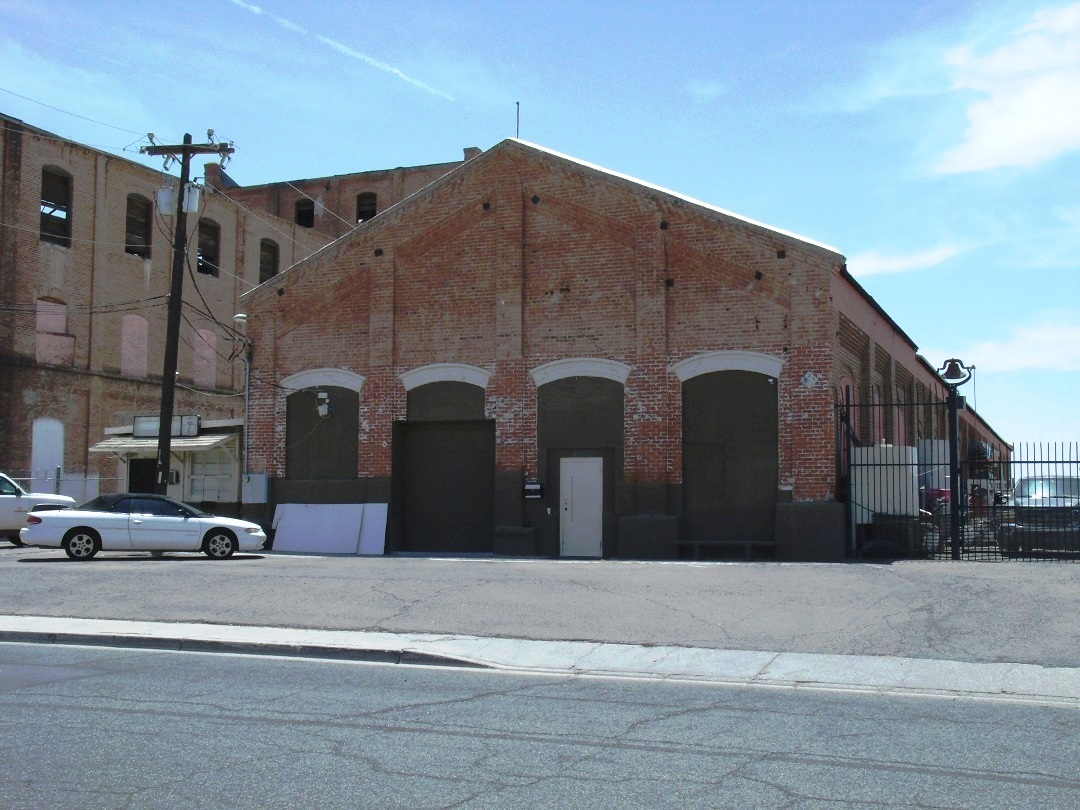
Boiler and lime kiln house and repair shop

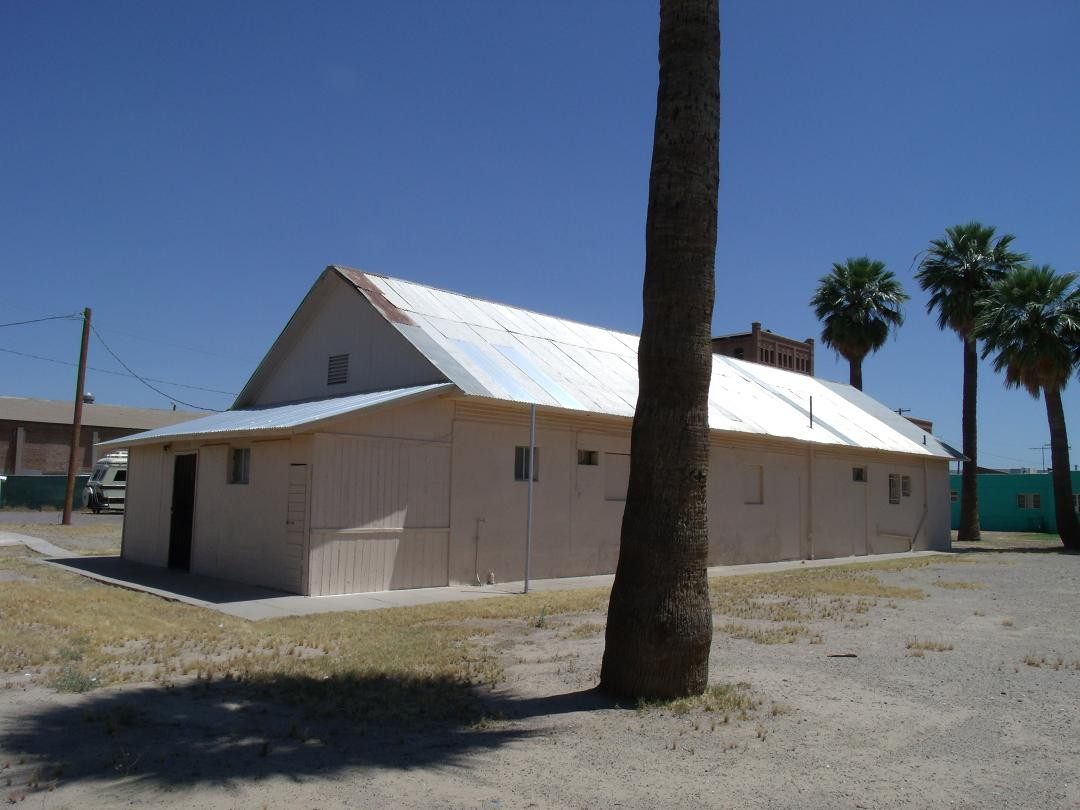
The Hoghe Bunkhouse

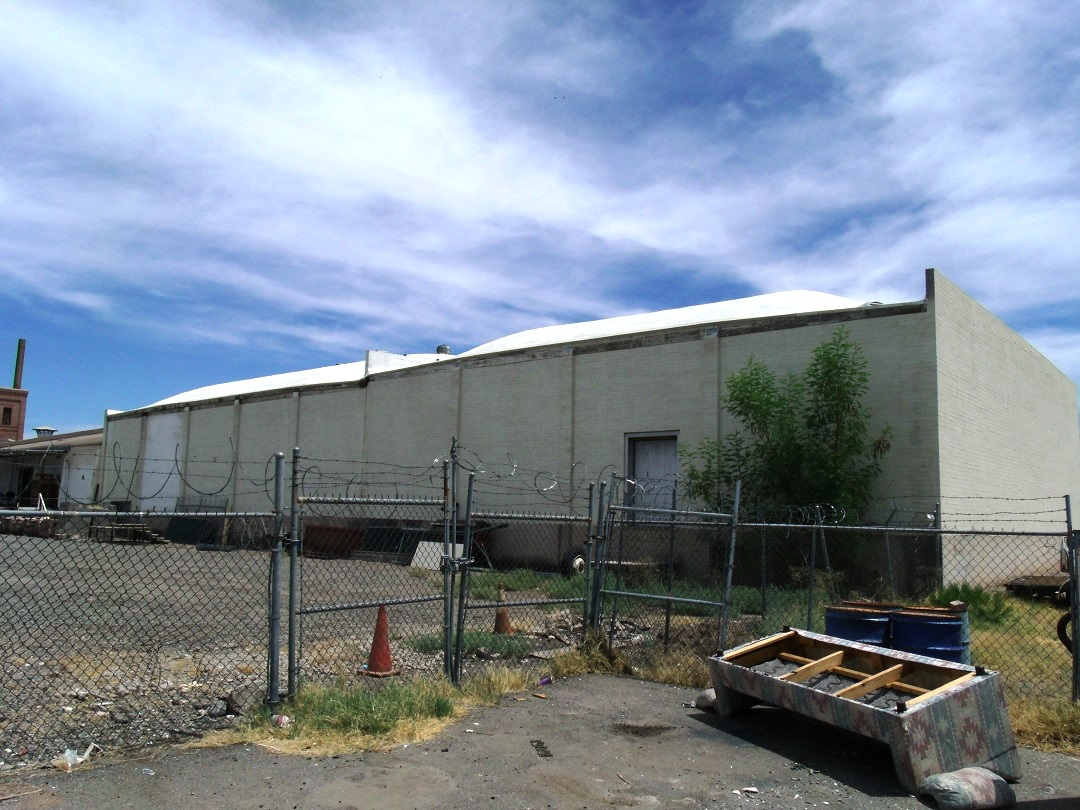
The Beet Sugar Factory Warehouses

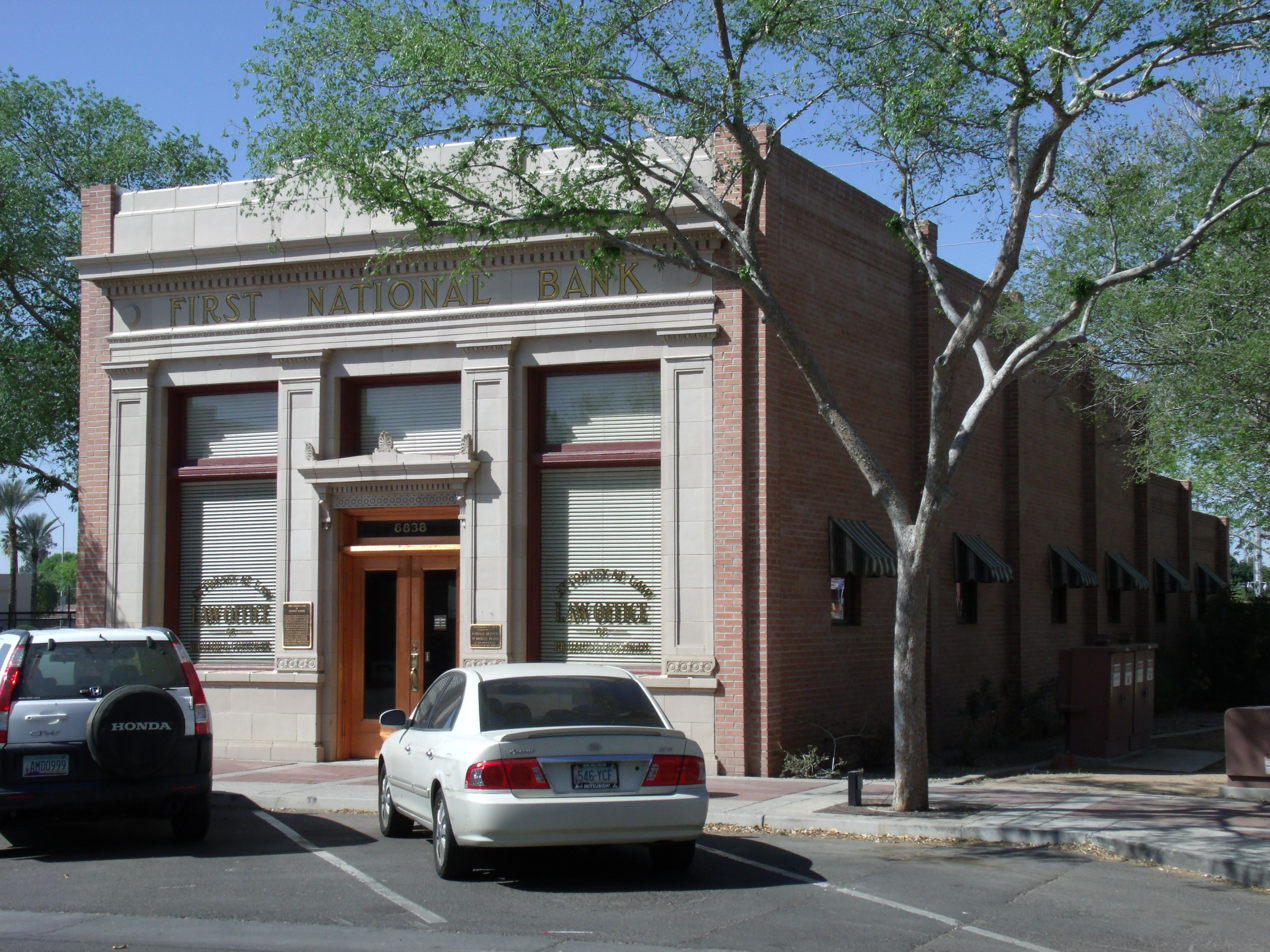
The First National Bank of Glendale

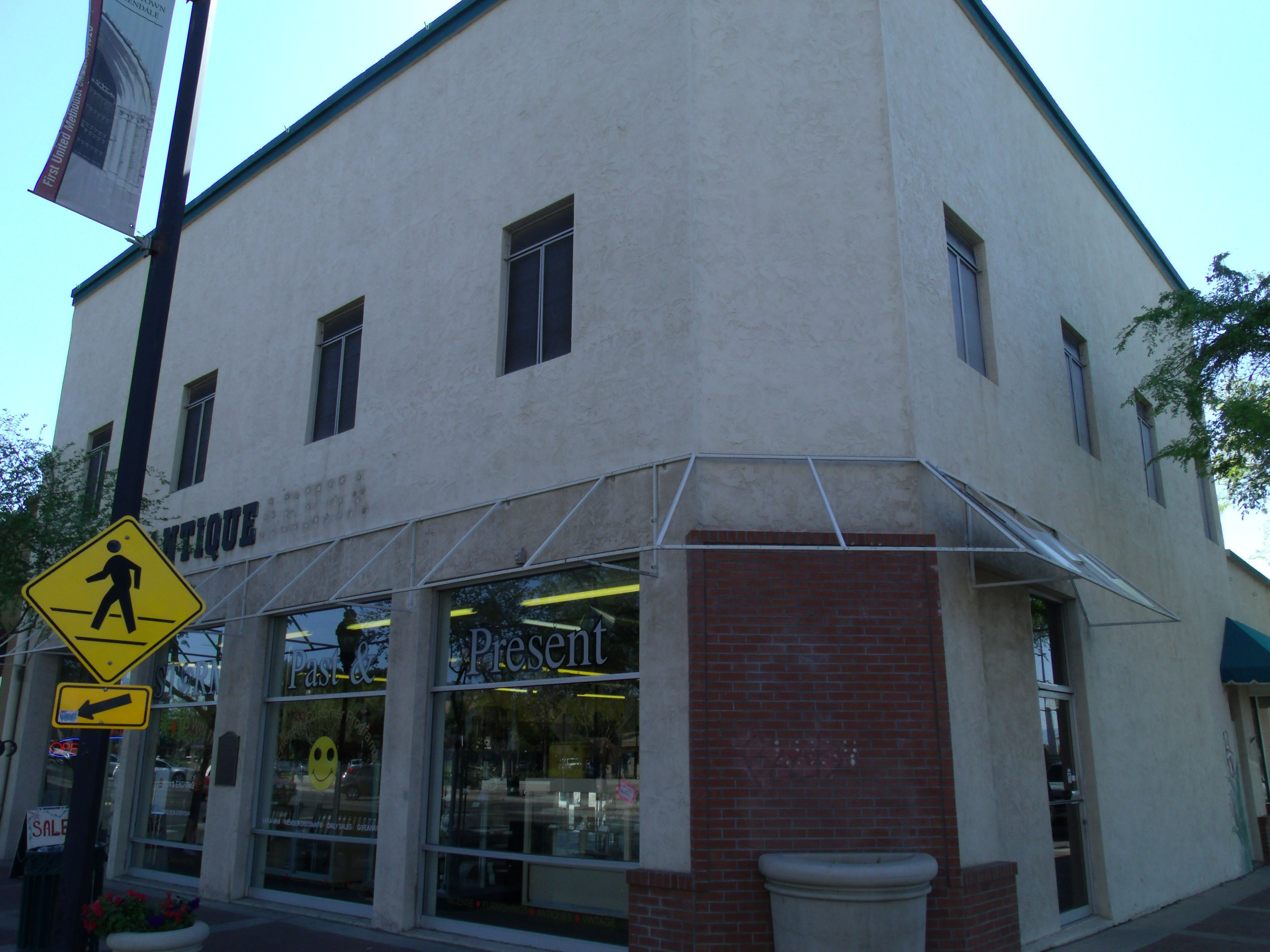
The C. L. Gillett Building

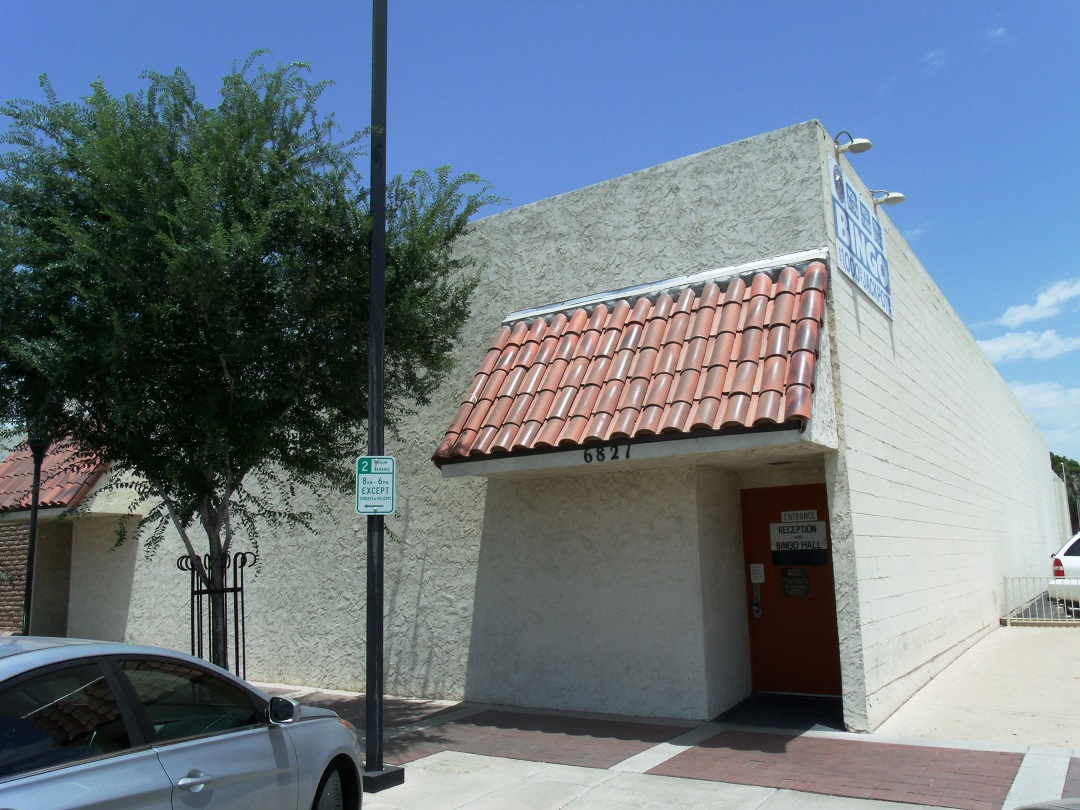
The Glendale's first mortuary

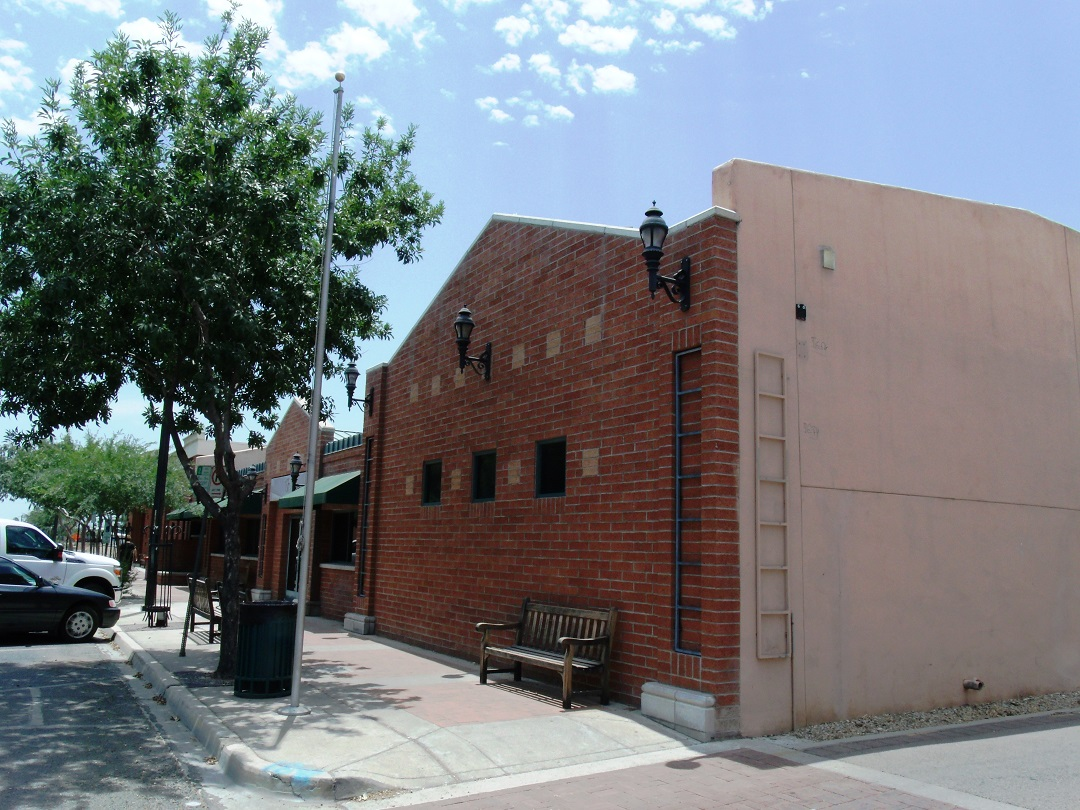
The Glendale's first Fire Station

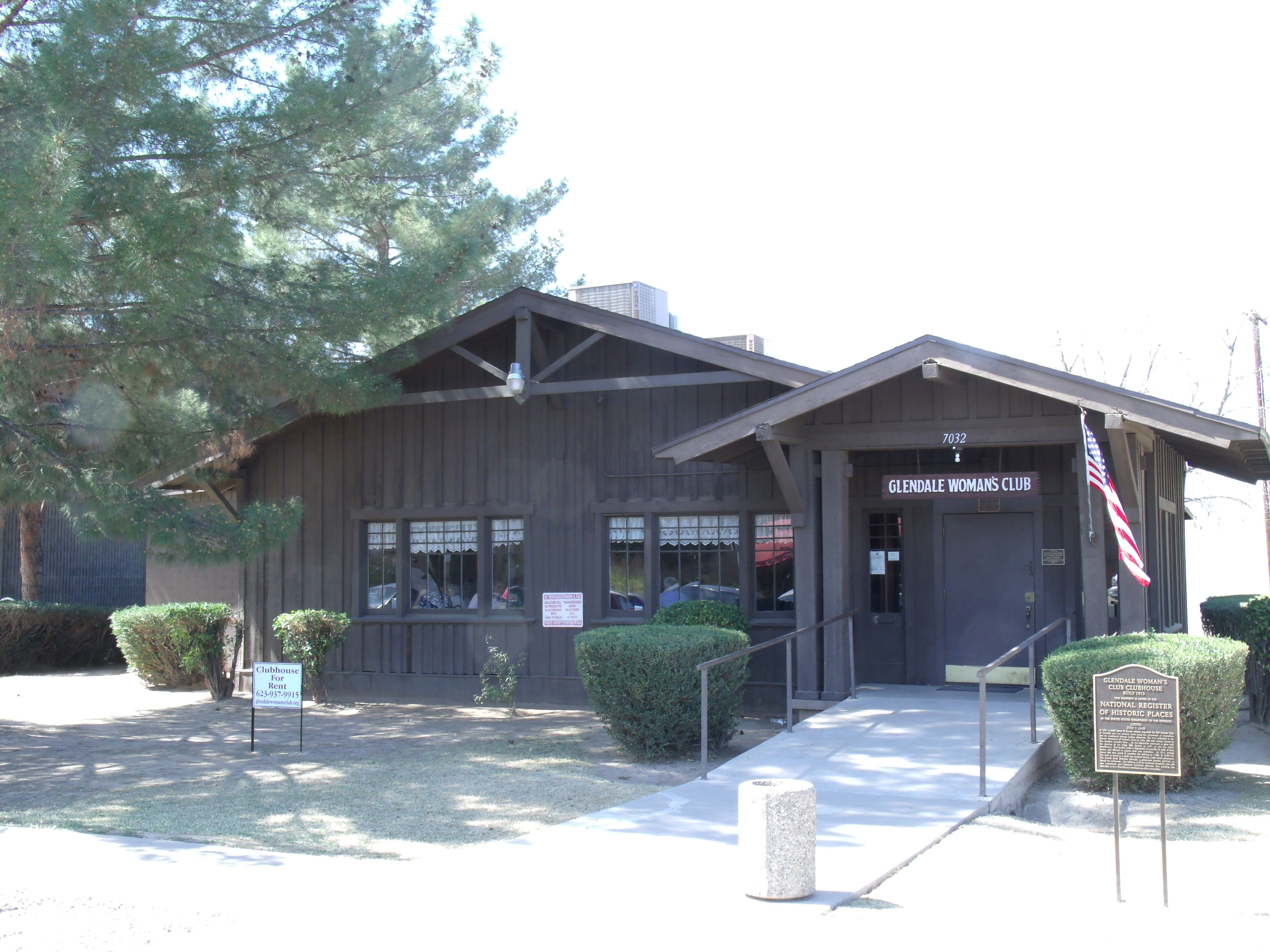
The Glendale Woman's Club

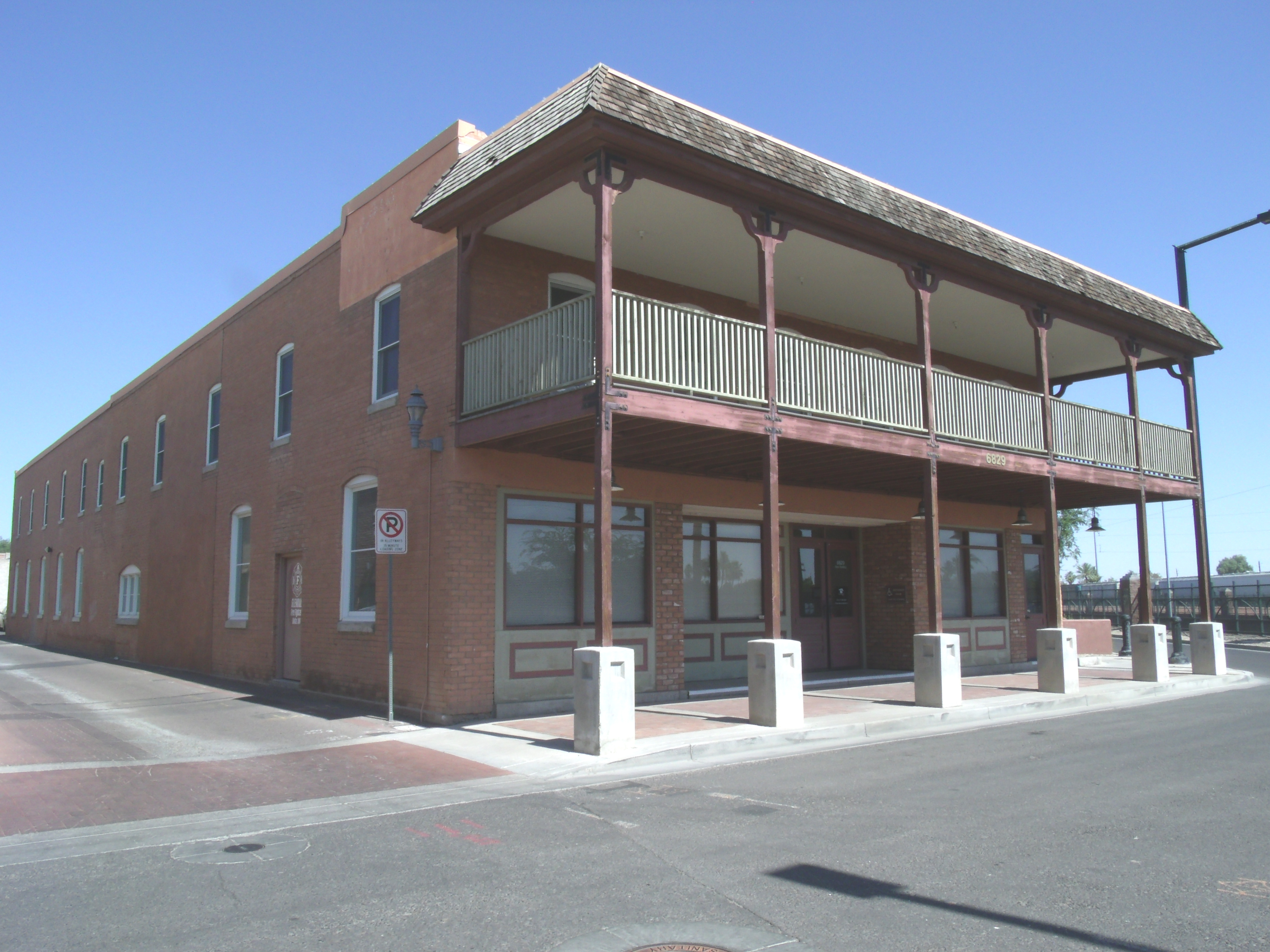
The Sine Brothers Hardware Store

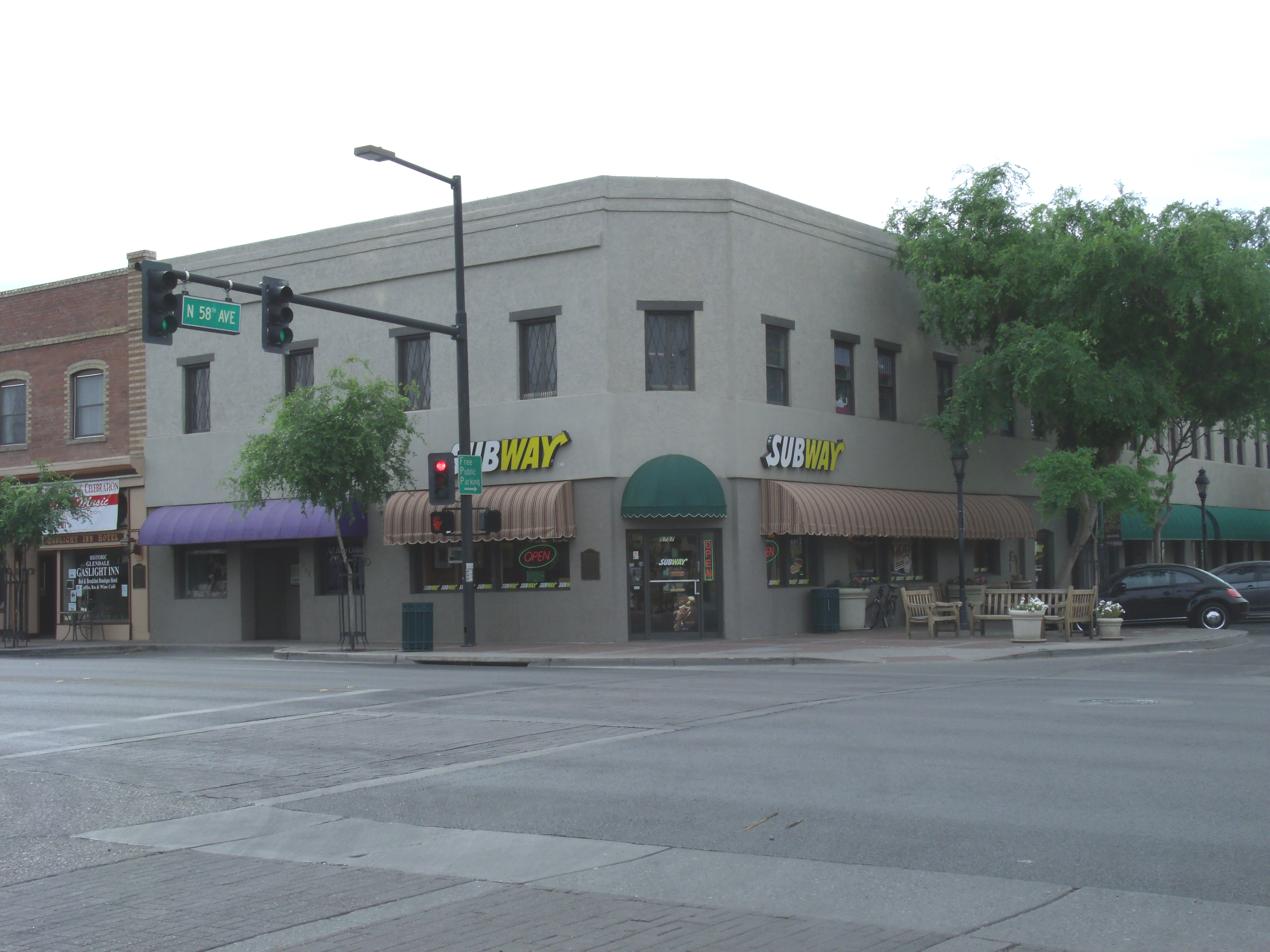
The Hine Building

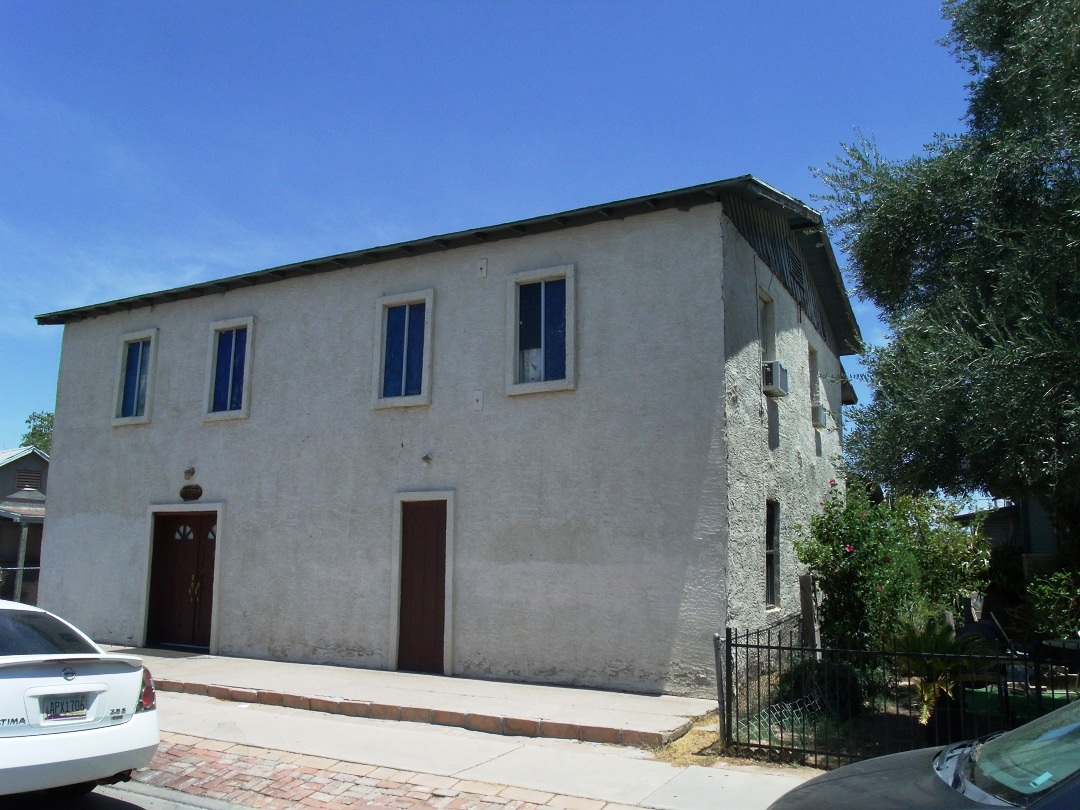
The Two Story Adobe Market/House

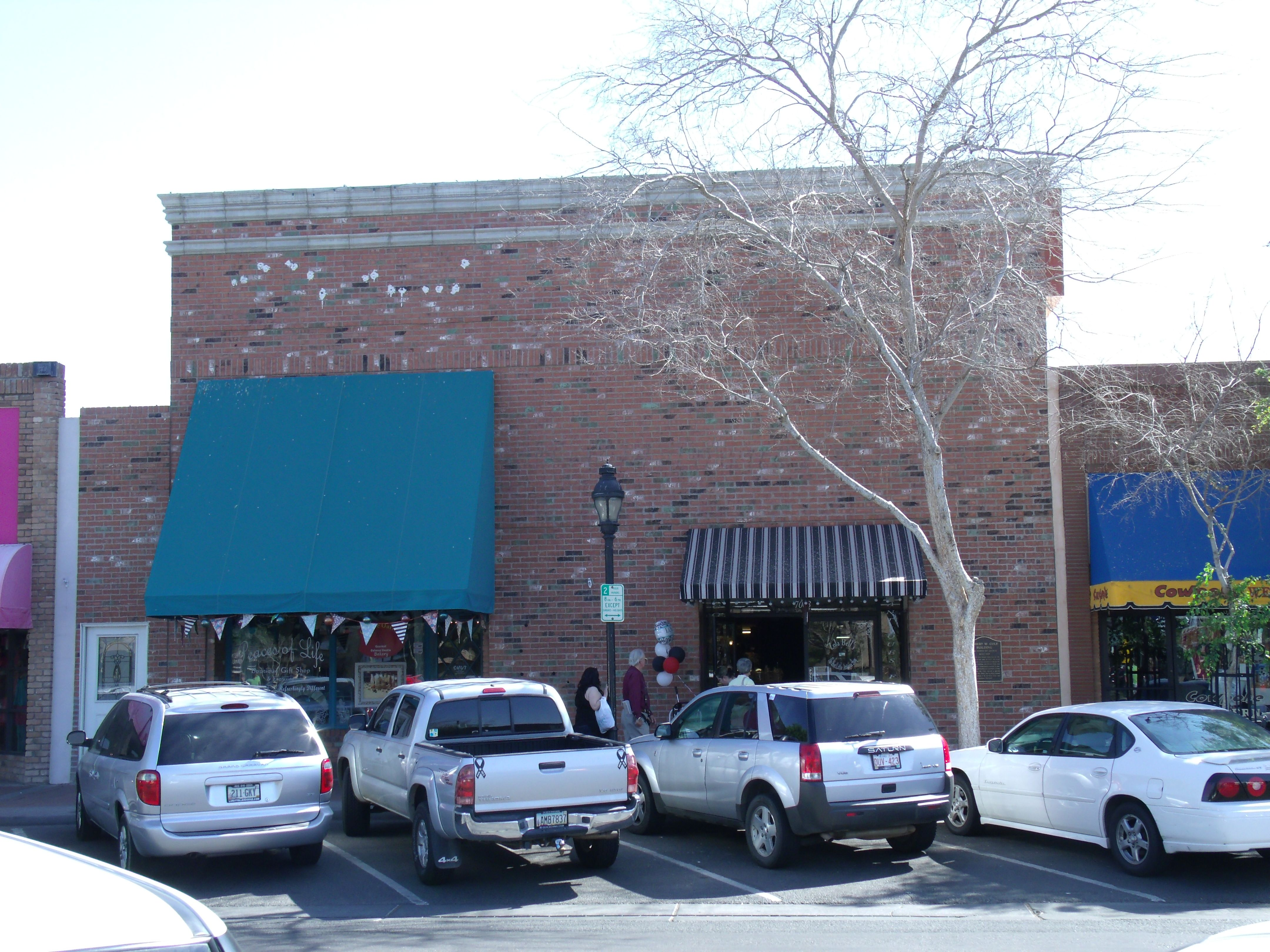
The Robert W. Cole Building

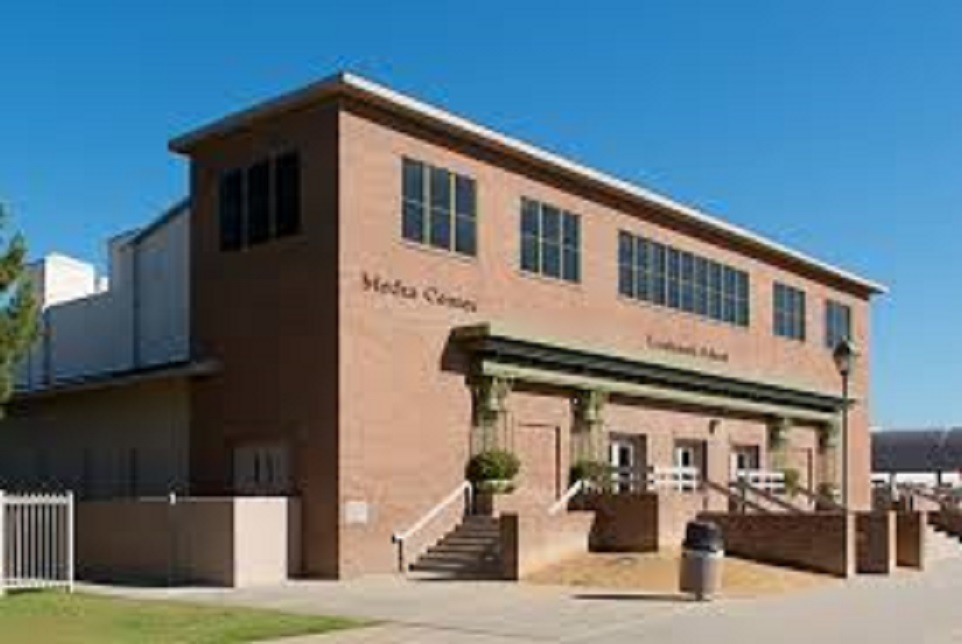
Landmark Middle School

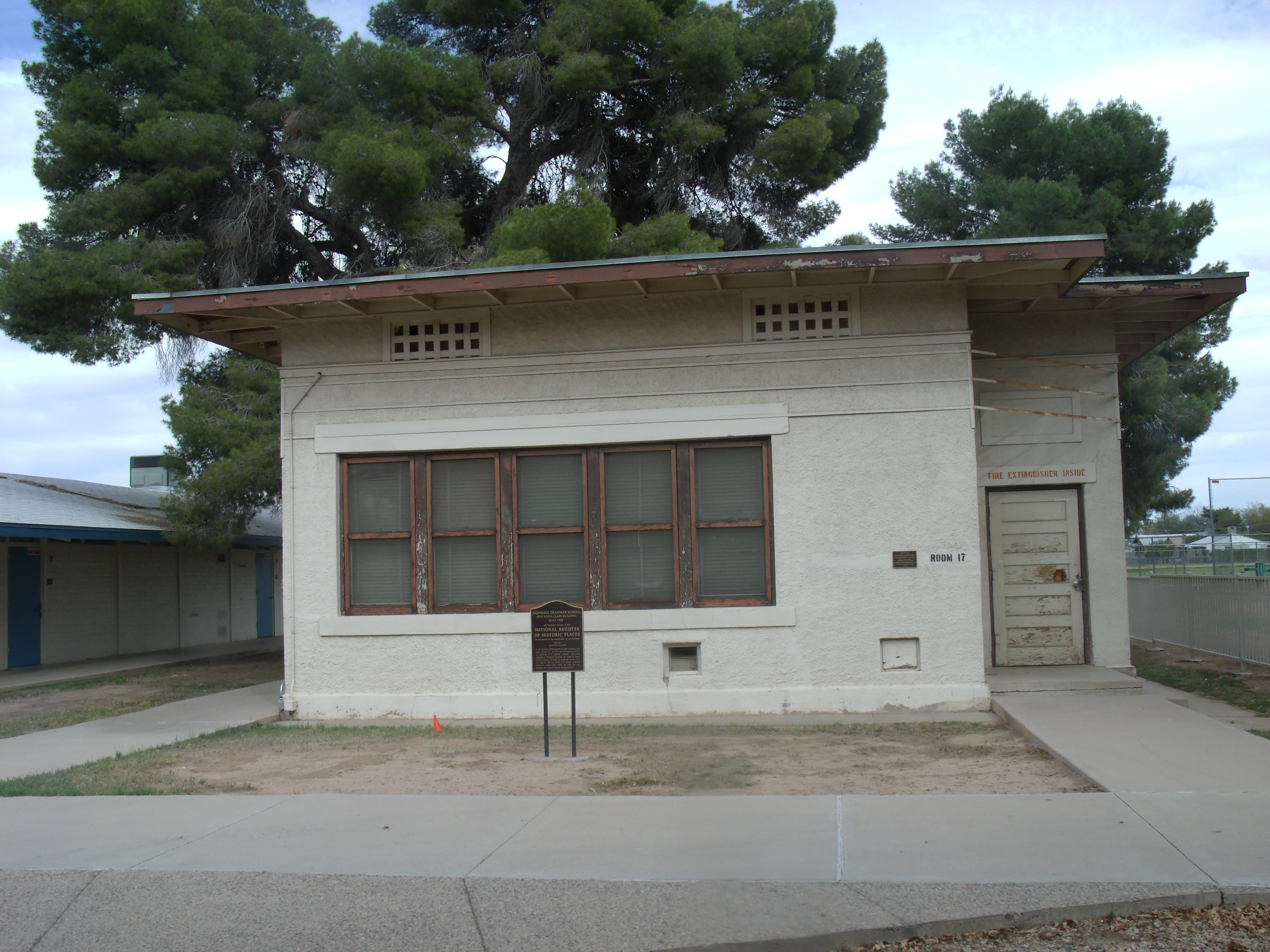
Glendale Grammar School One-Room Class Building

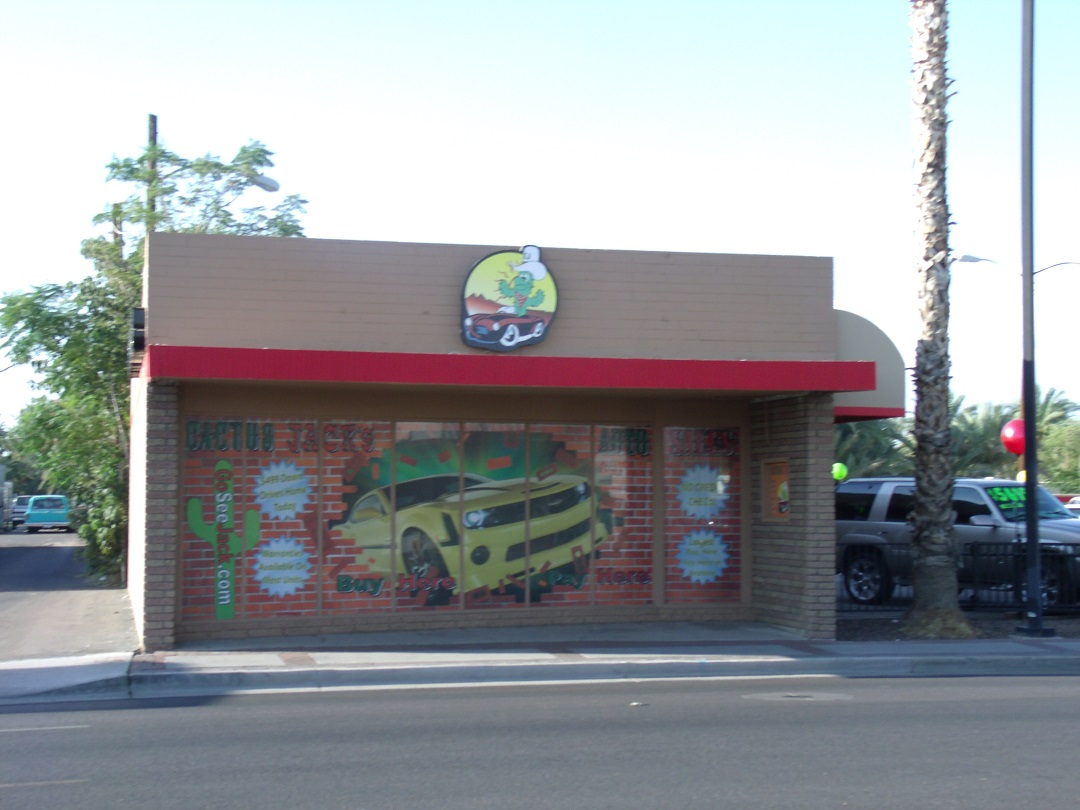
The Glendale Herald and Valley Printers Building

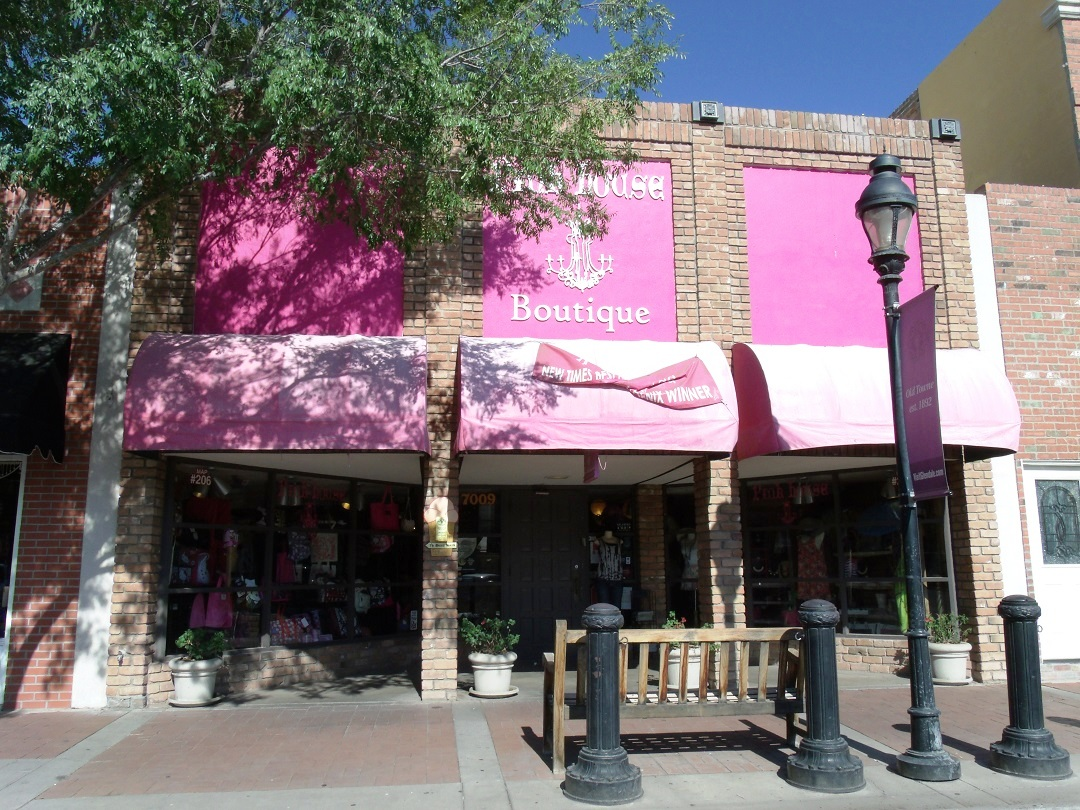
The “El Rey Theatre”

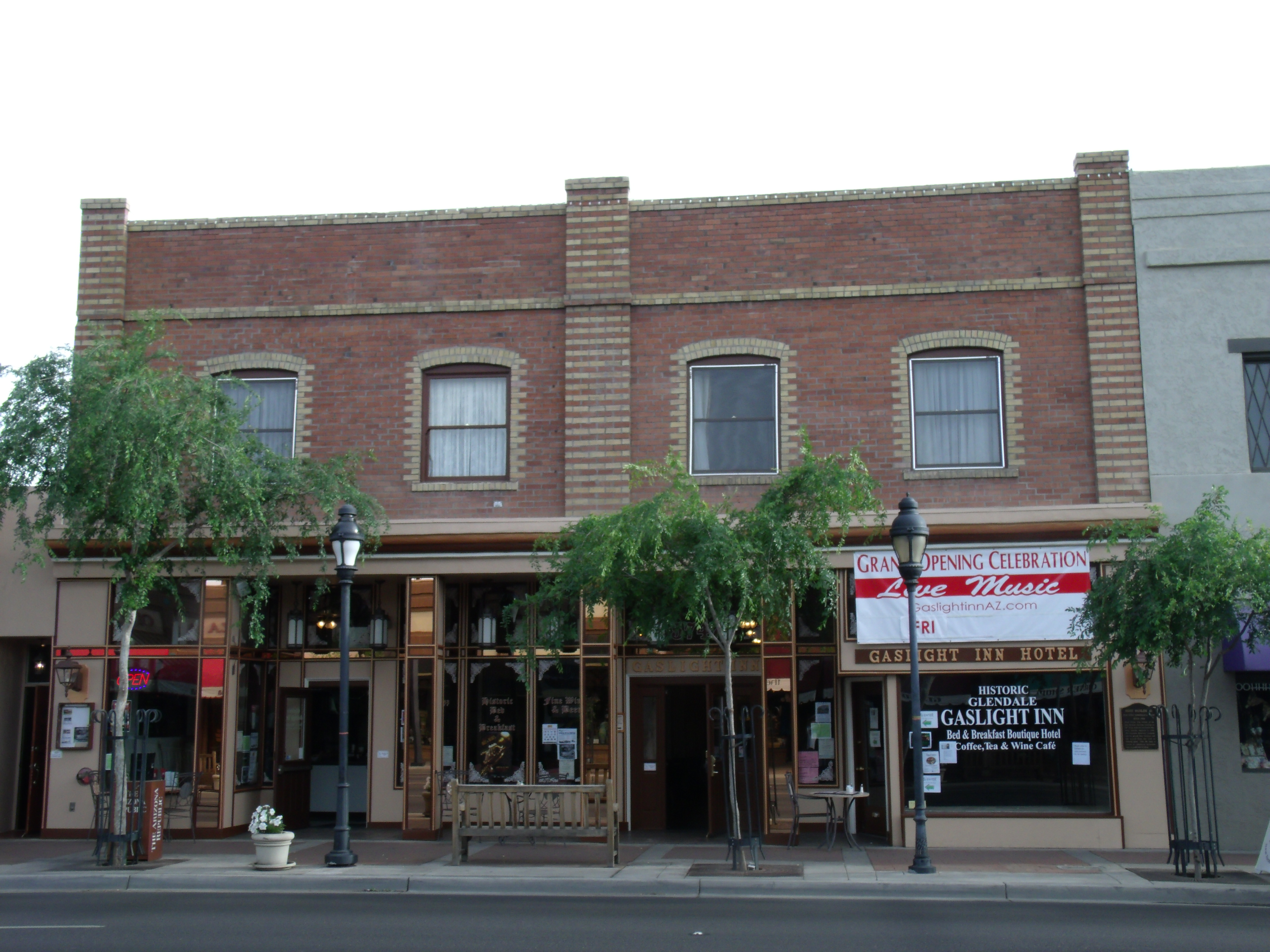
The Sine Building

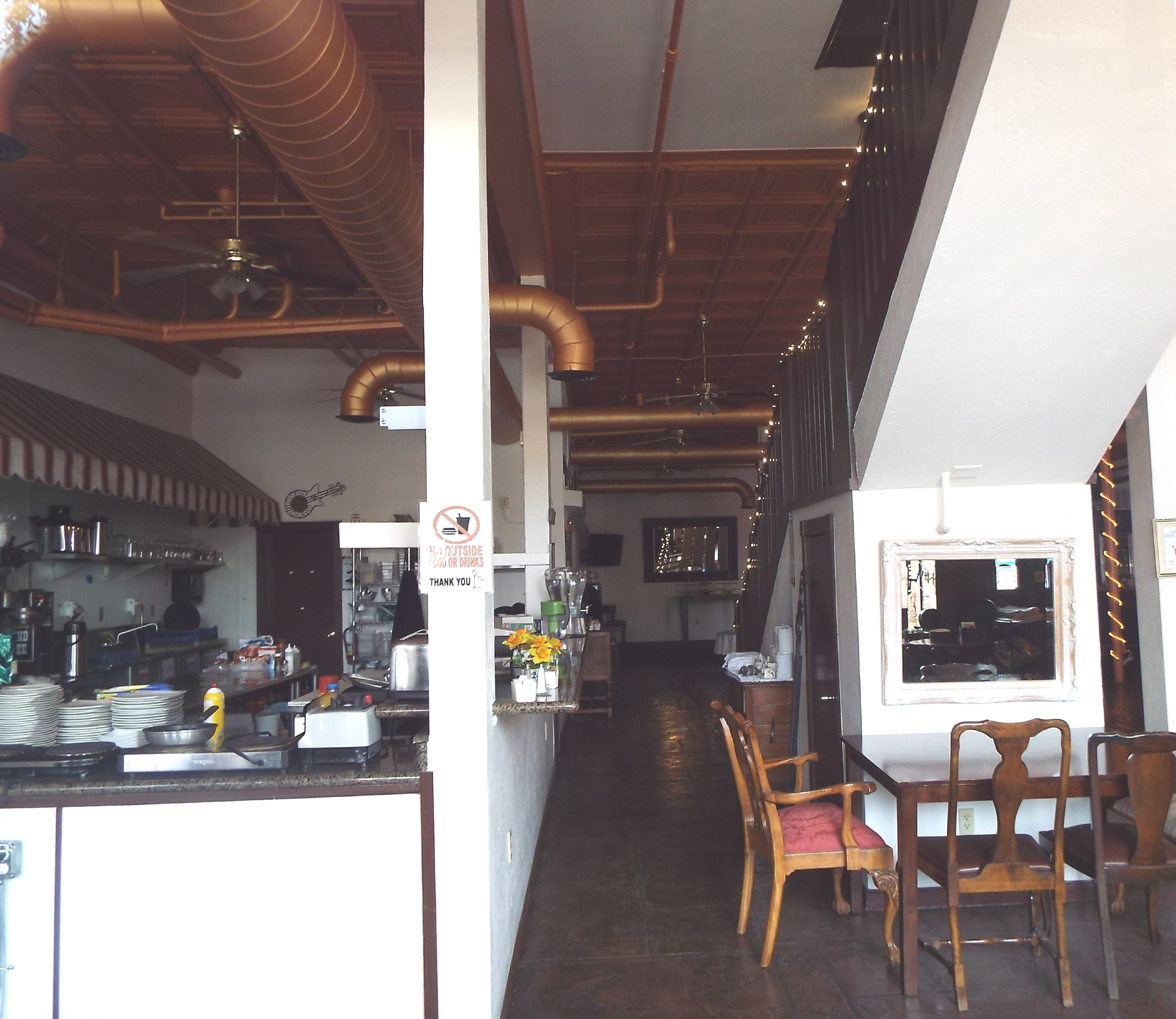
Inside the Sine Building

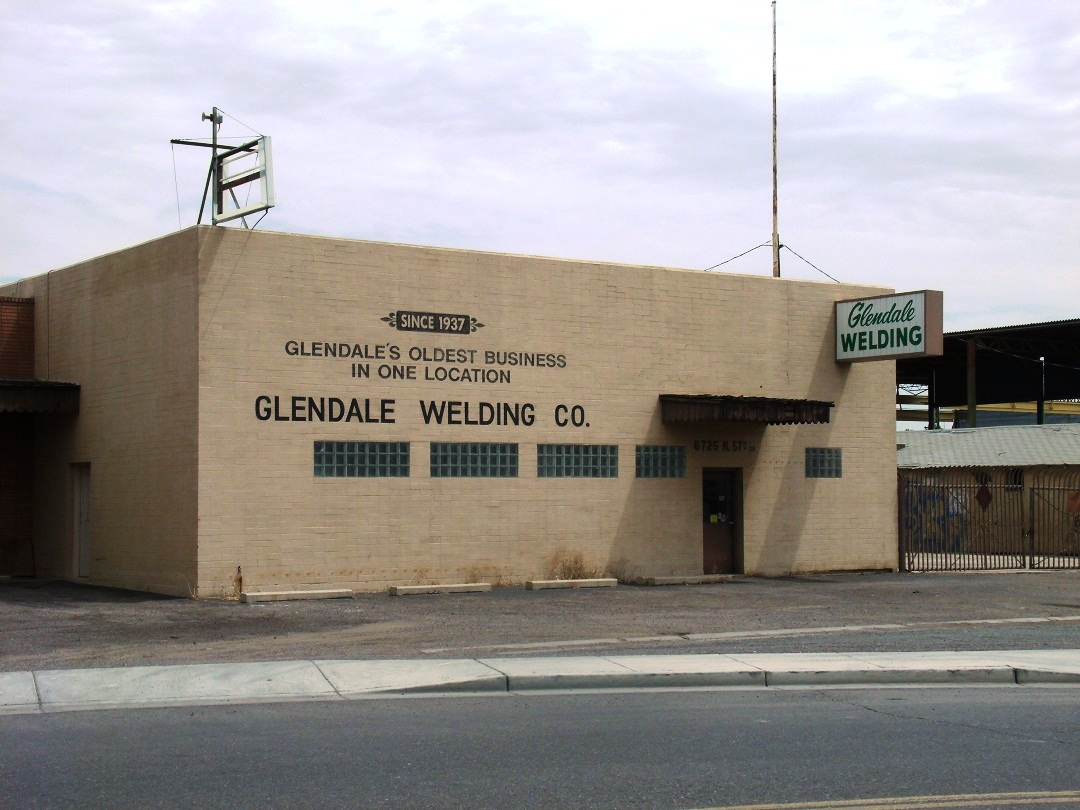
The Glendale Welding Company Building

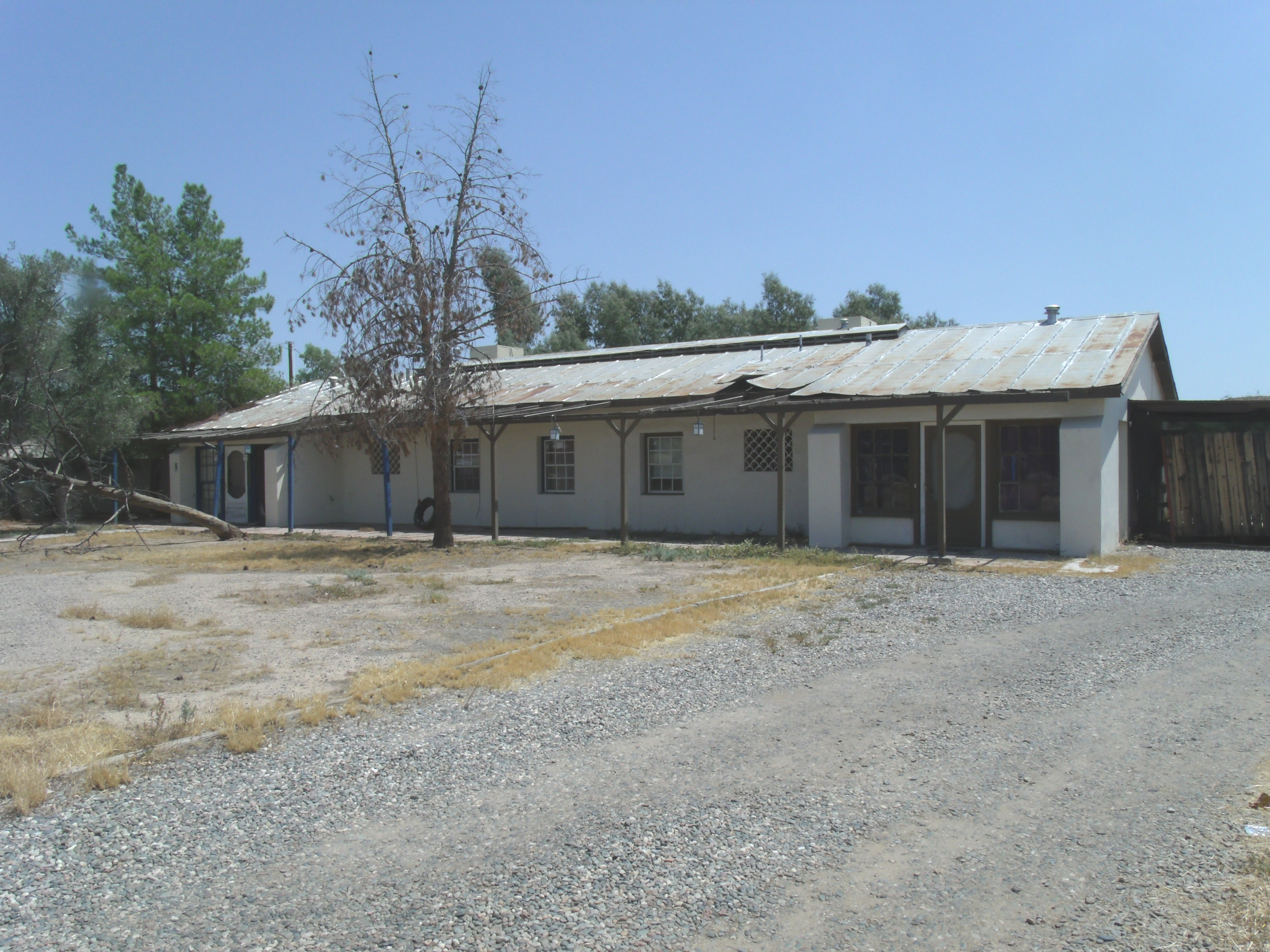
The Glendale Tract Community Center

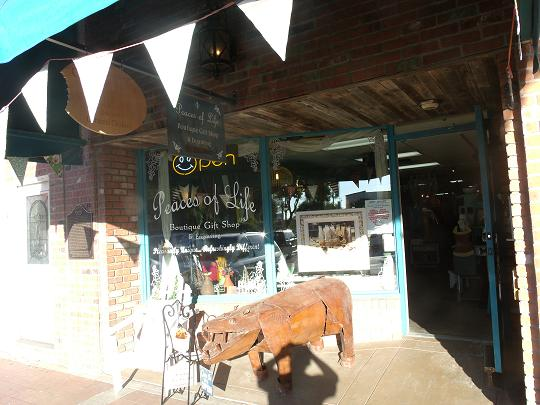
Filers Bakery

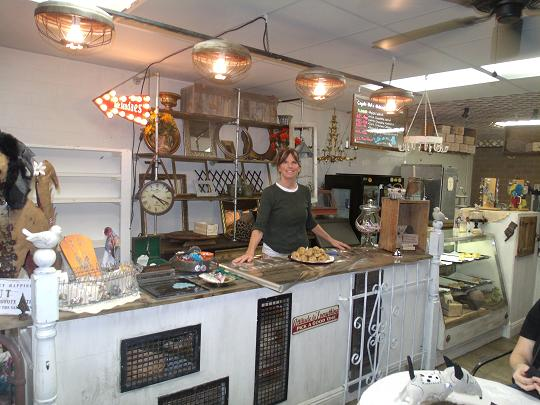
Inside Coyotes Oaties location which once housed the Historic Filers Bakery (founded in 1939); posing is co-owner Annette

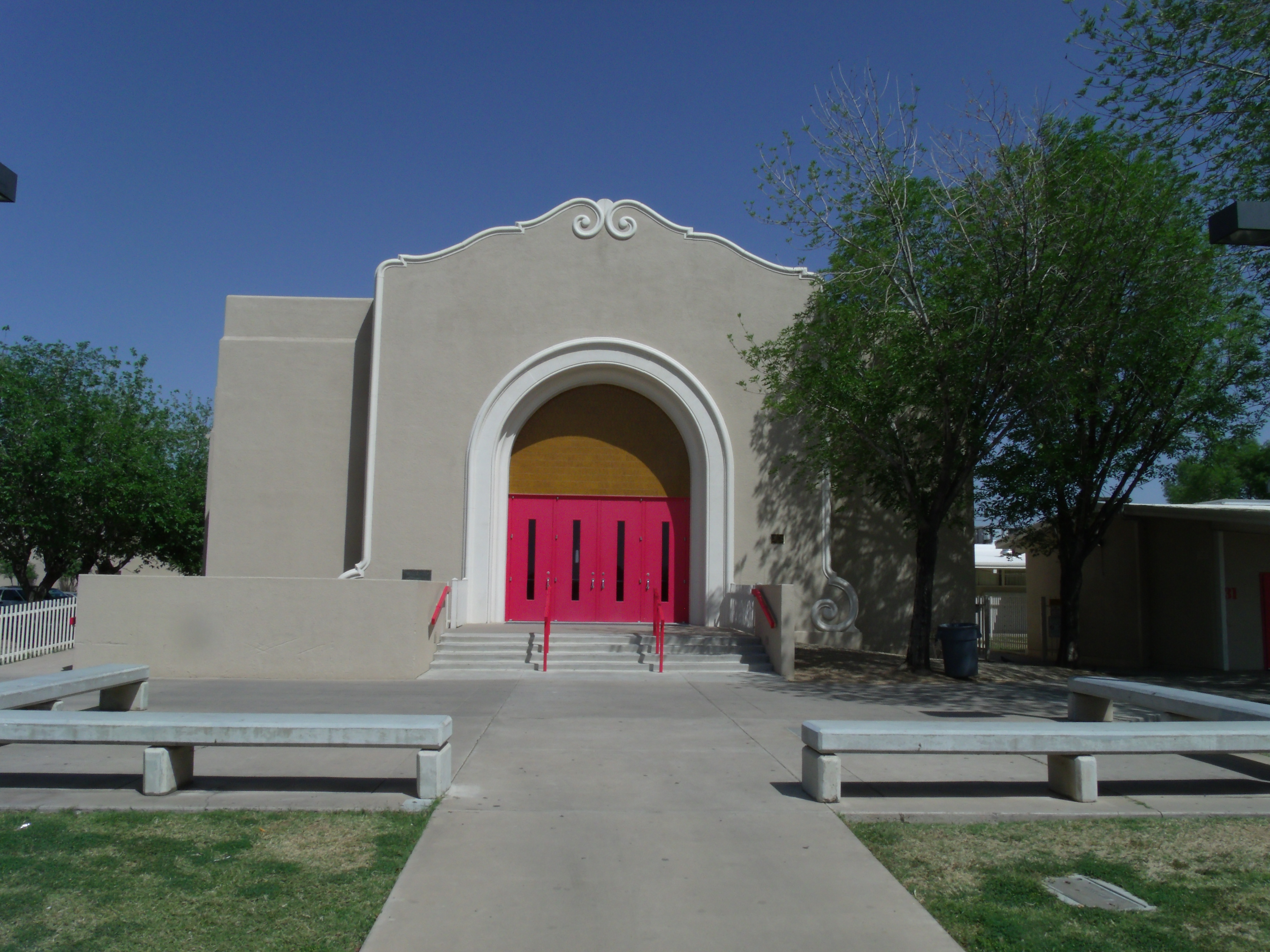
The Glendale High School Auditorium

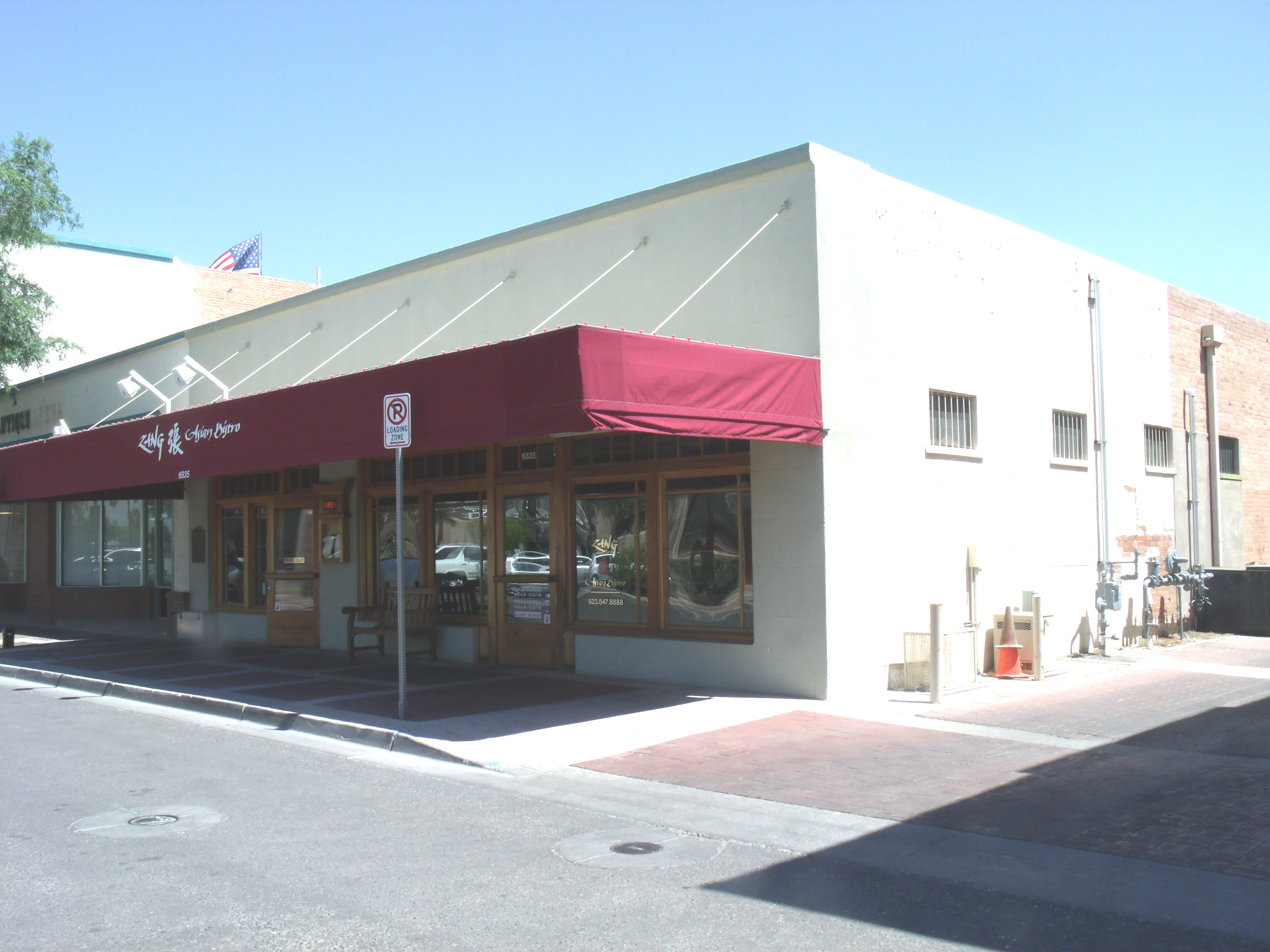
The Coury Building

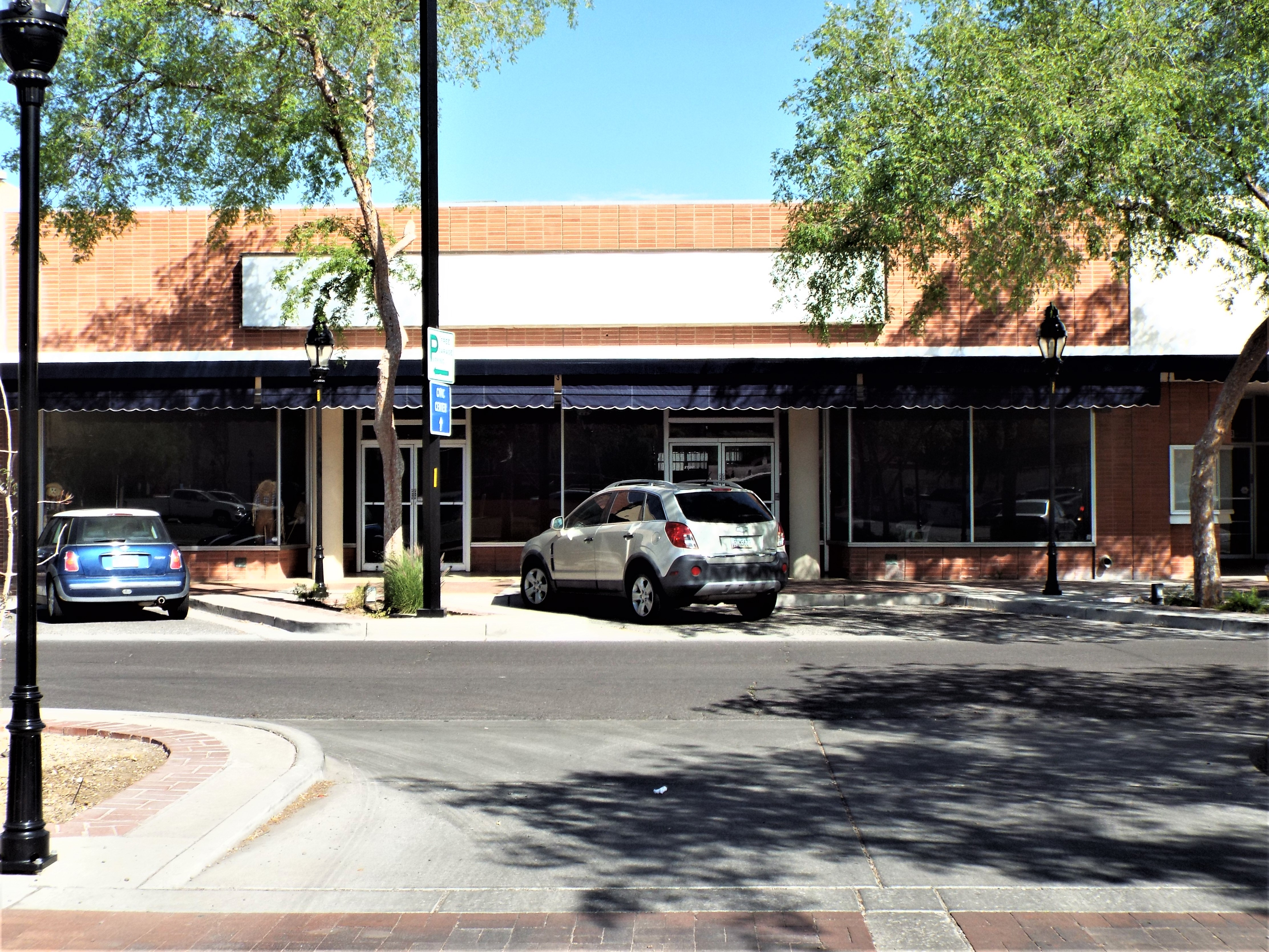
Woolworth's Building

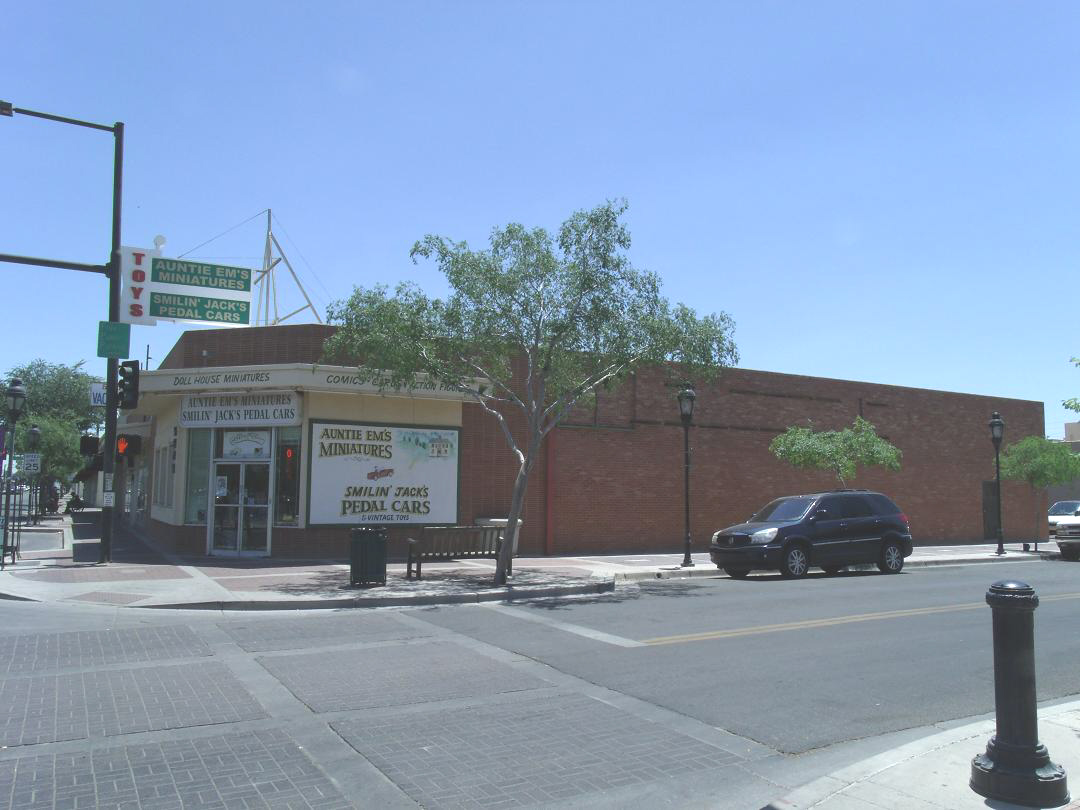
Glendale Pharmacy

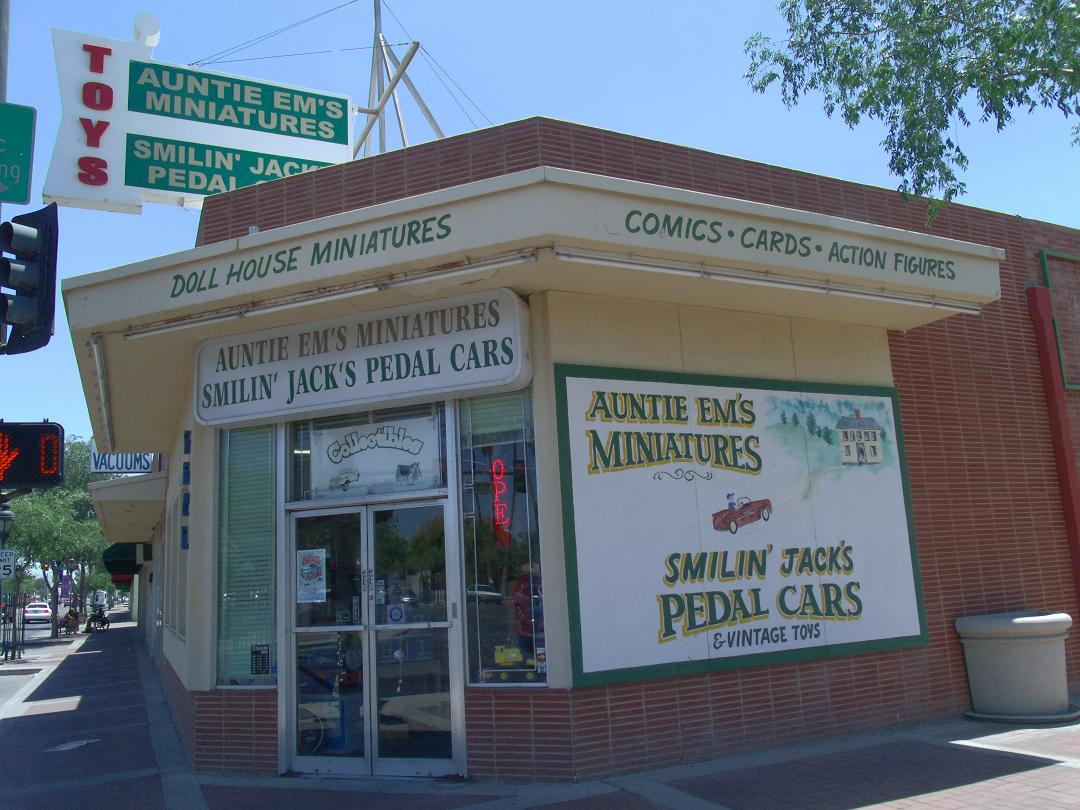
Close-up view of the Glendale Pharmacy

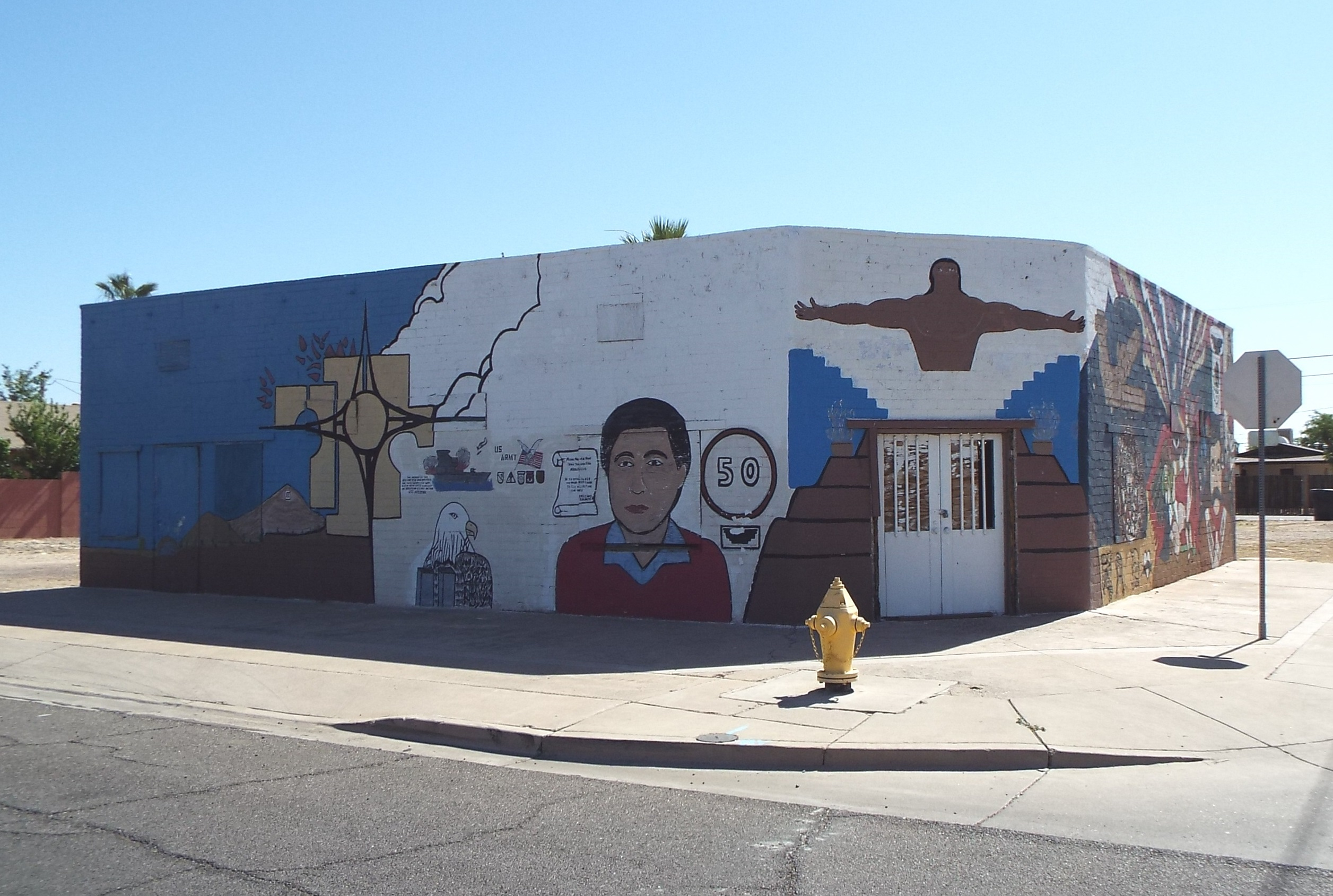
Joe's Market

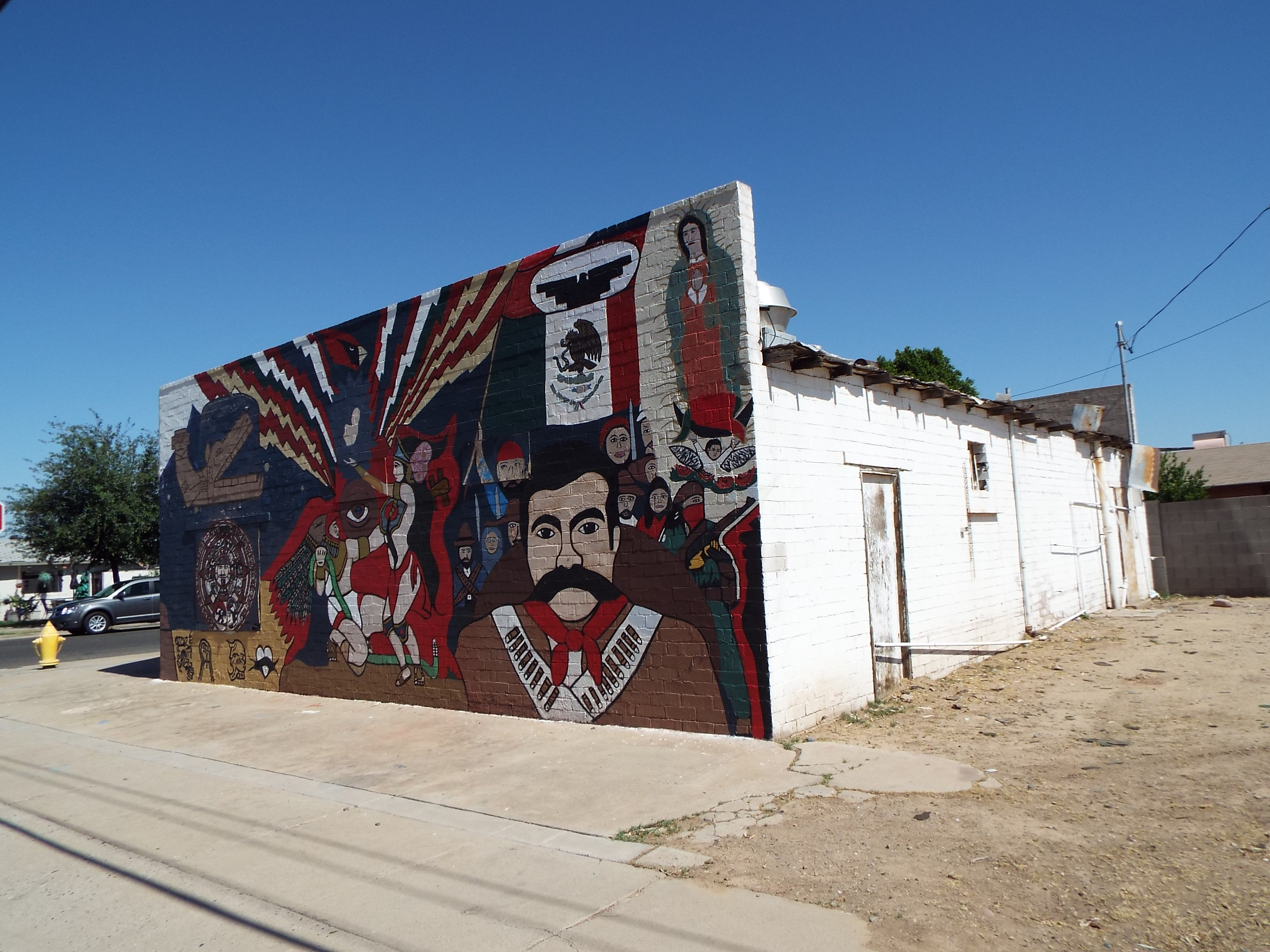
Different view of Joe's Market

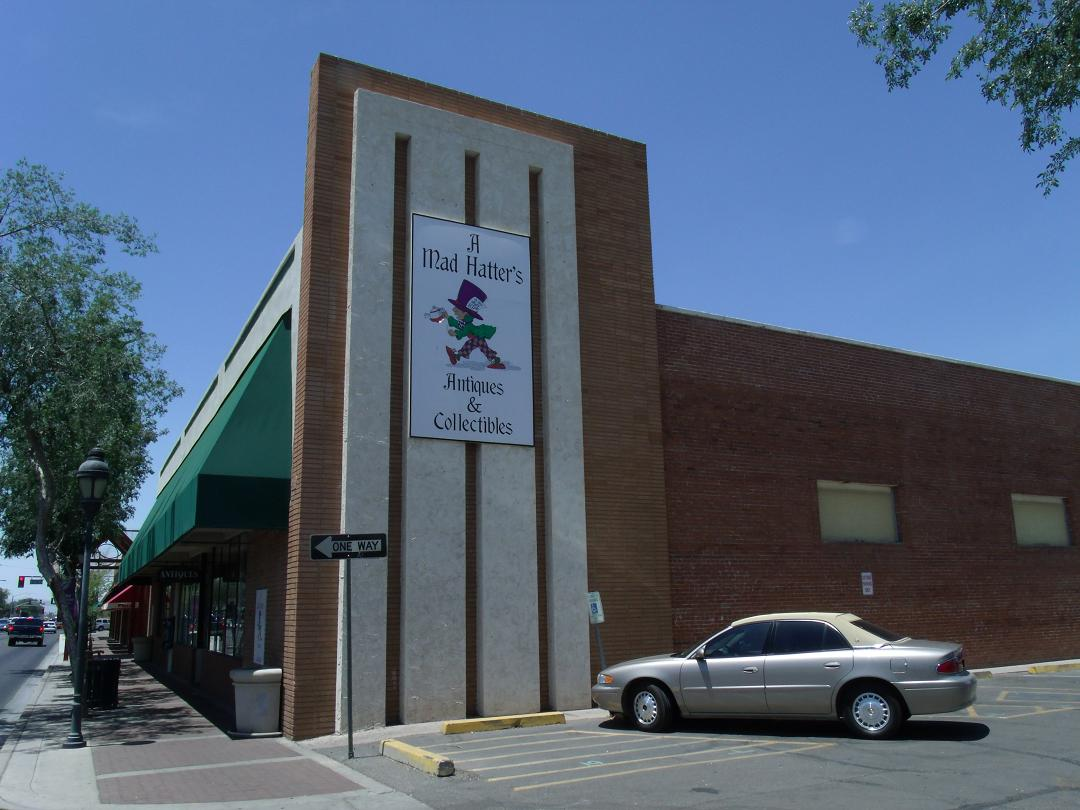
Basha's Supermarket

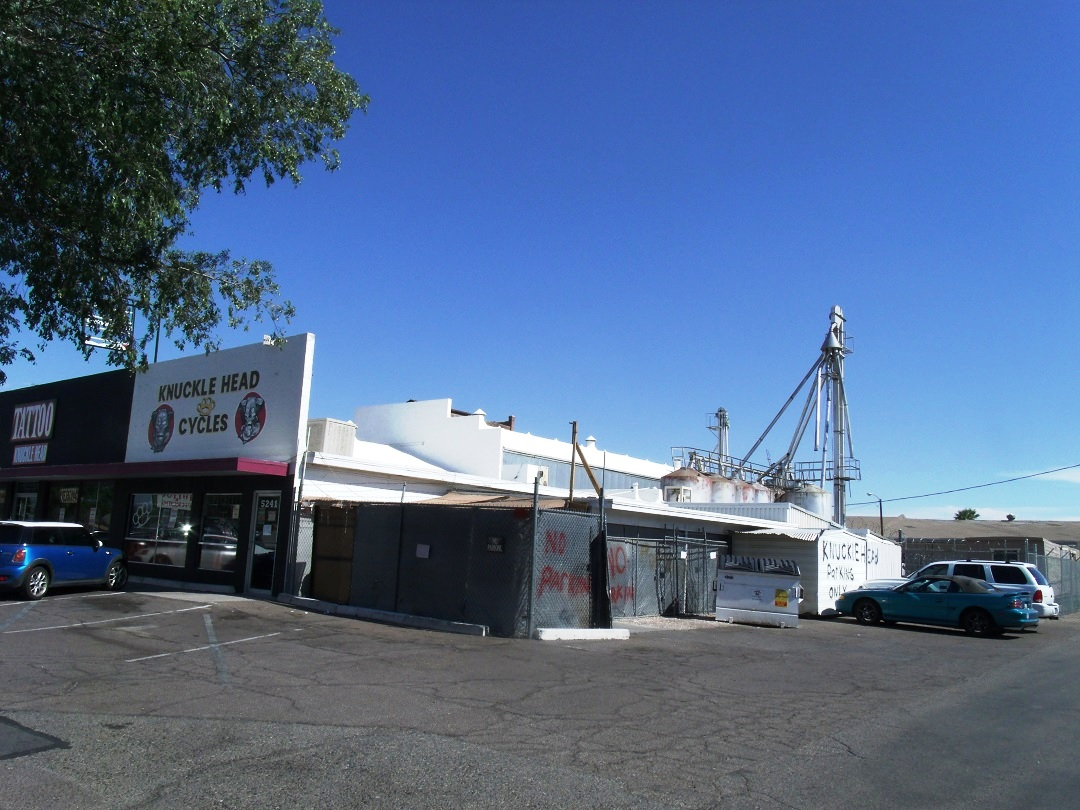
The original building of Pratt's Feed and Supply

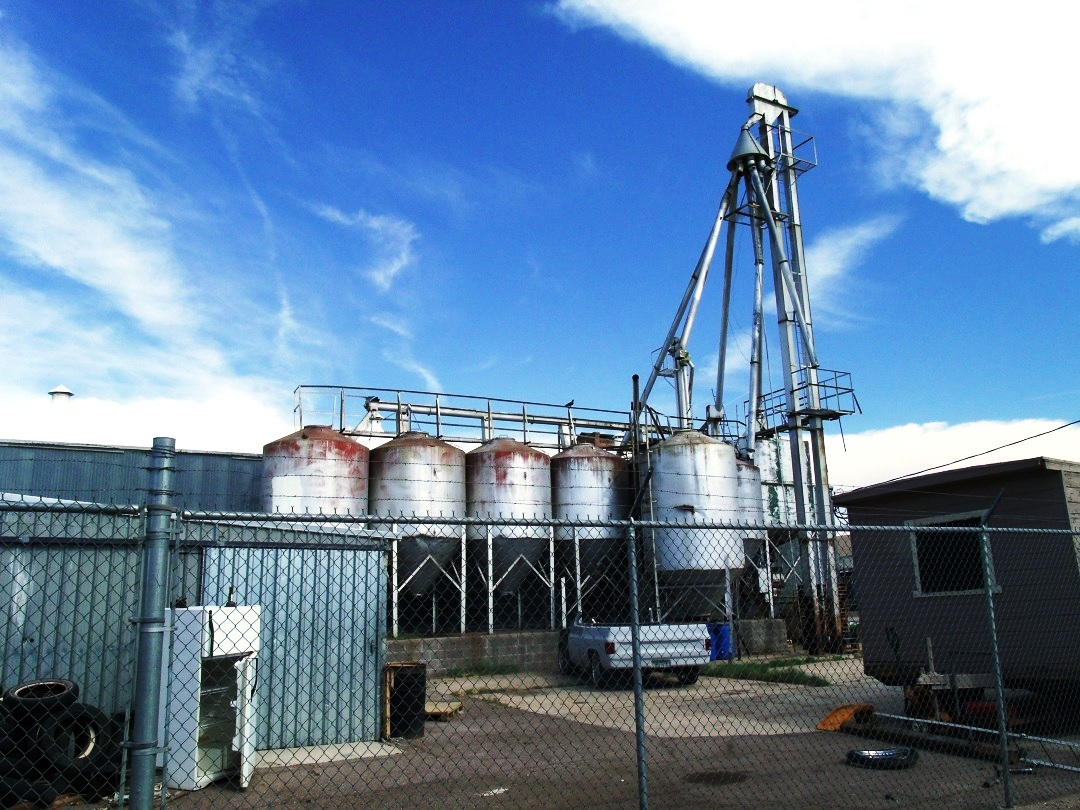
The Pratt Mill

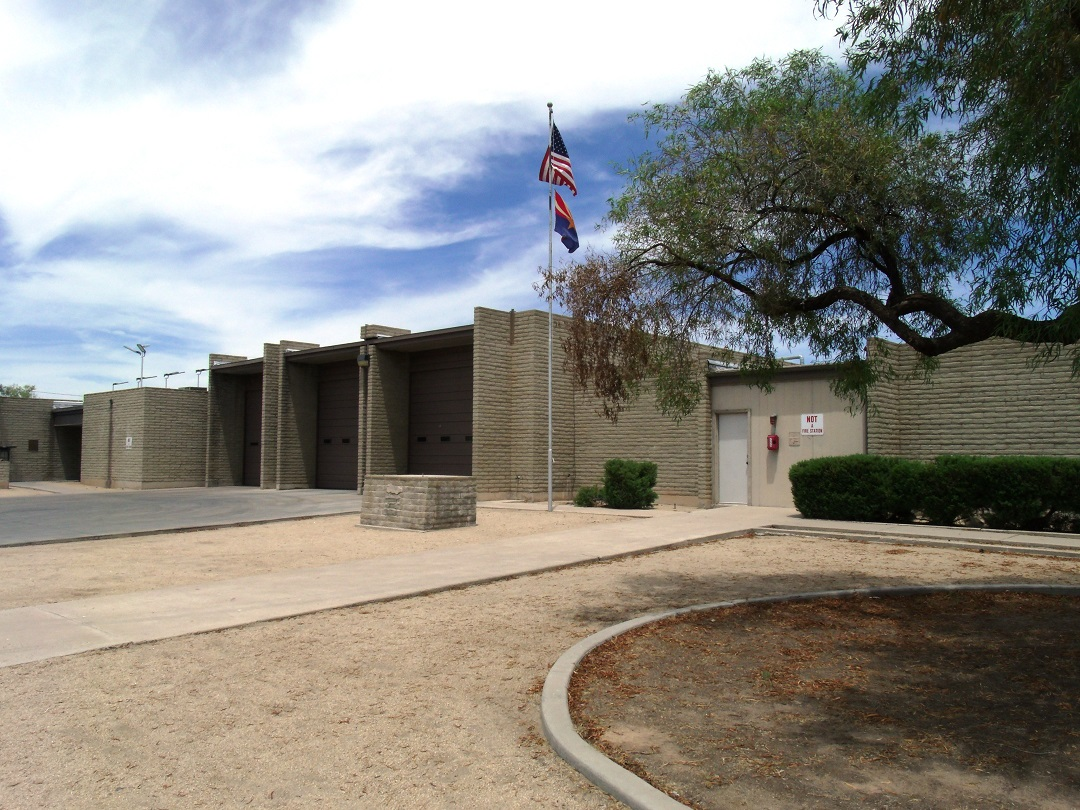
The original Fire Station #151

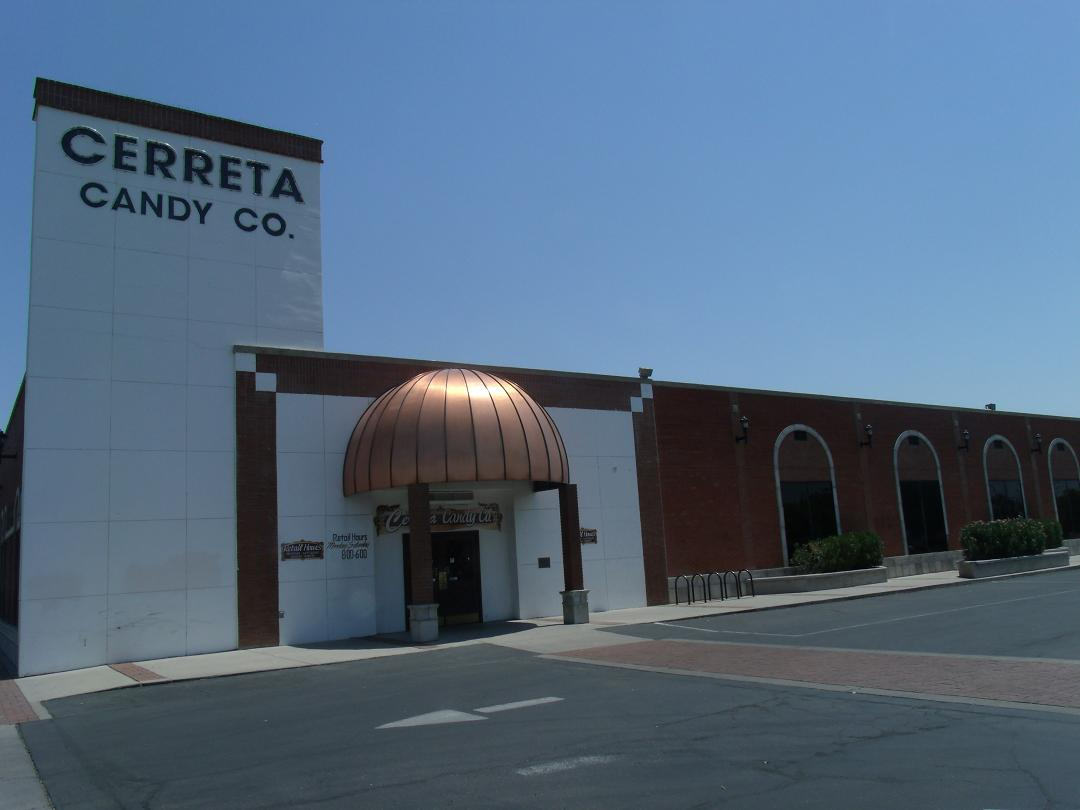
Cerreta Candy Co. 2002 West Valley Treasure

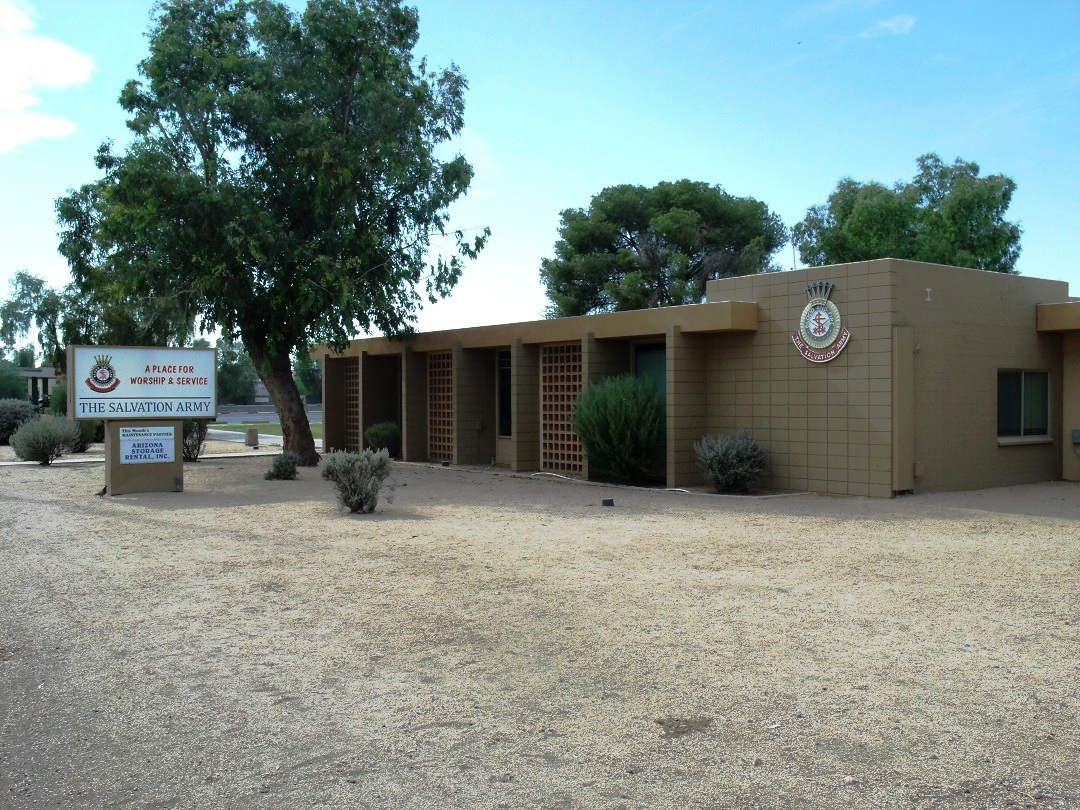
The "Northwest Hospital"

=== Restoration of Morcomb's Service Station ===
In the 1930s Ed and Bessie Morcomb converted the piece of land which they purchased in Glendale into a Signal Oil Company gas station in the corner of Grand and Myrtle Aves. They built a house right next to the property with bricks made from the area.

The property was abandoned in 1978. The property was restored by the Glendale Historical Society in 2013. It is located within the Myrtle Avenue Residential Historic District which is listed in the National Register of Historic Places ref: 08001345.

Pictured are the Morcomb Gas Station, gasoline pumps including a 1918 visi-bowl gas pump and house as they looked before and after their restoration.

Historic Morcomb's Service Station in Glendale
Before and after its restoration
Myrtle Avenue Residential Historic District
Listed in the National Register of Historic Places Places ref: 08001345.
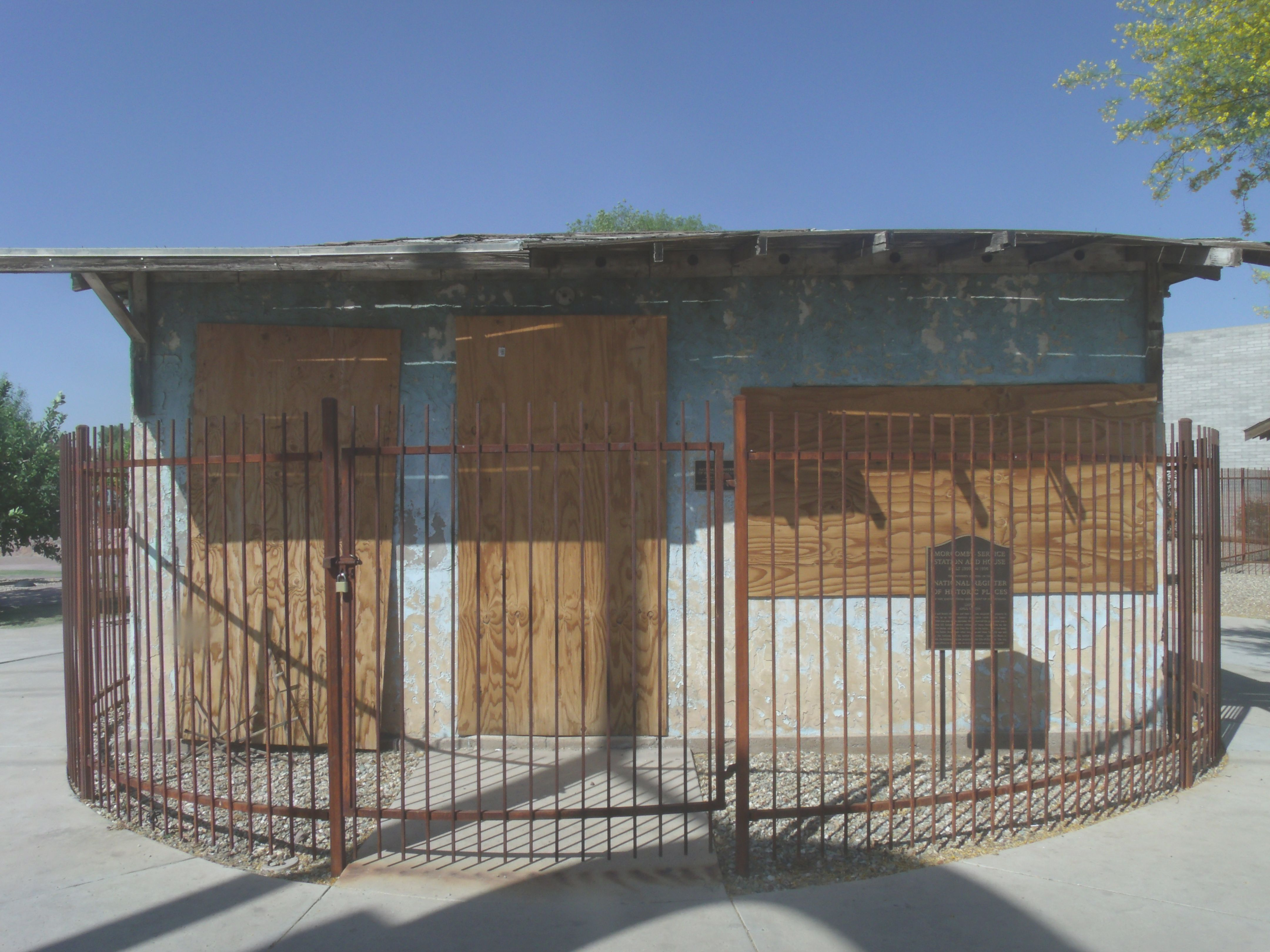
Morcomb's Service Station, as it looked in 2010.

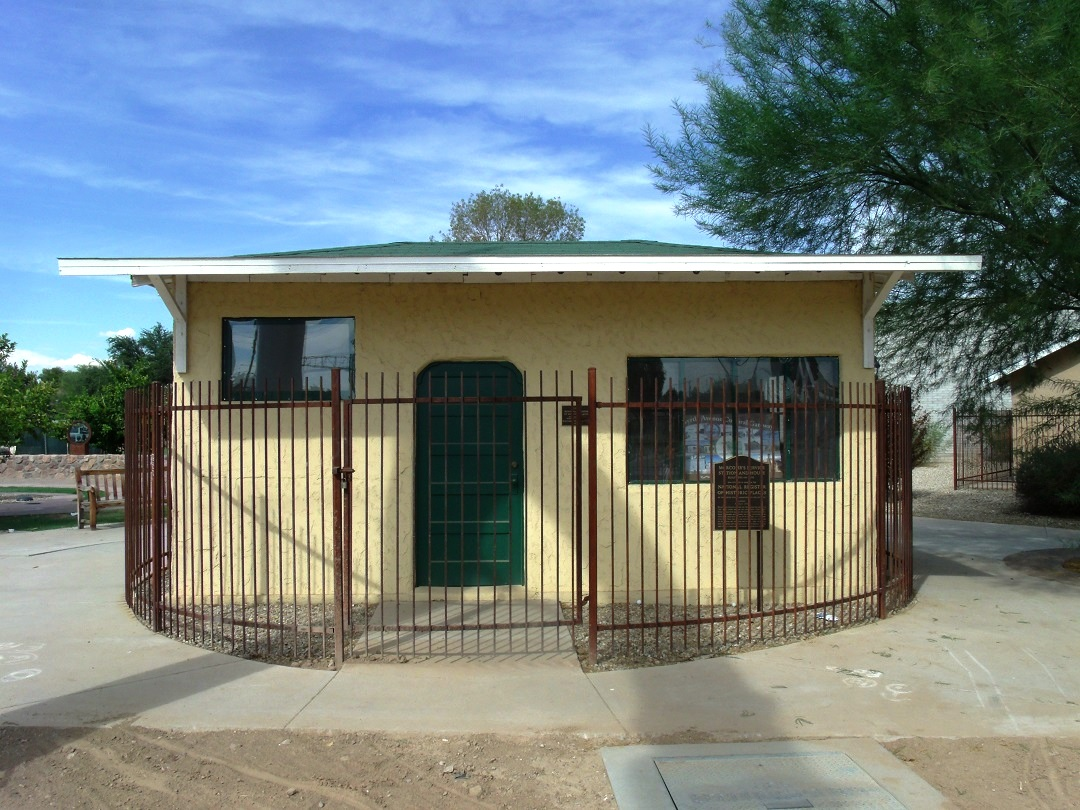
Morcomb's Service Station in 2013. I

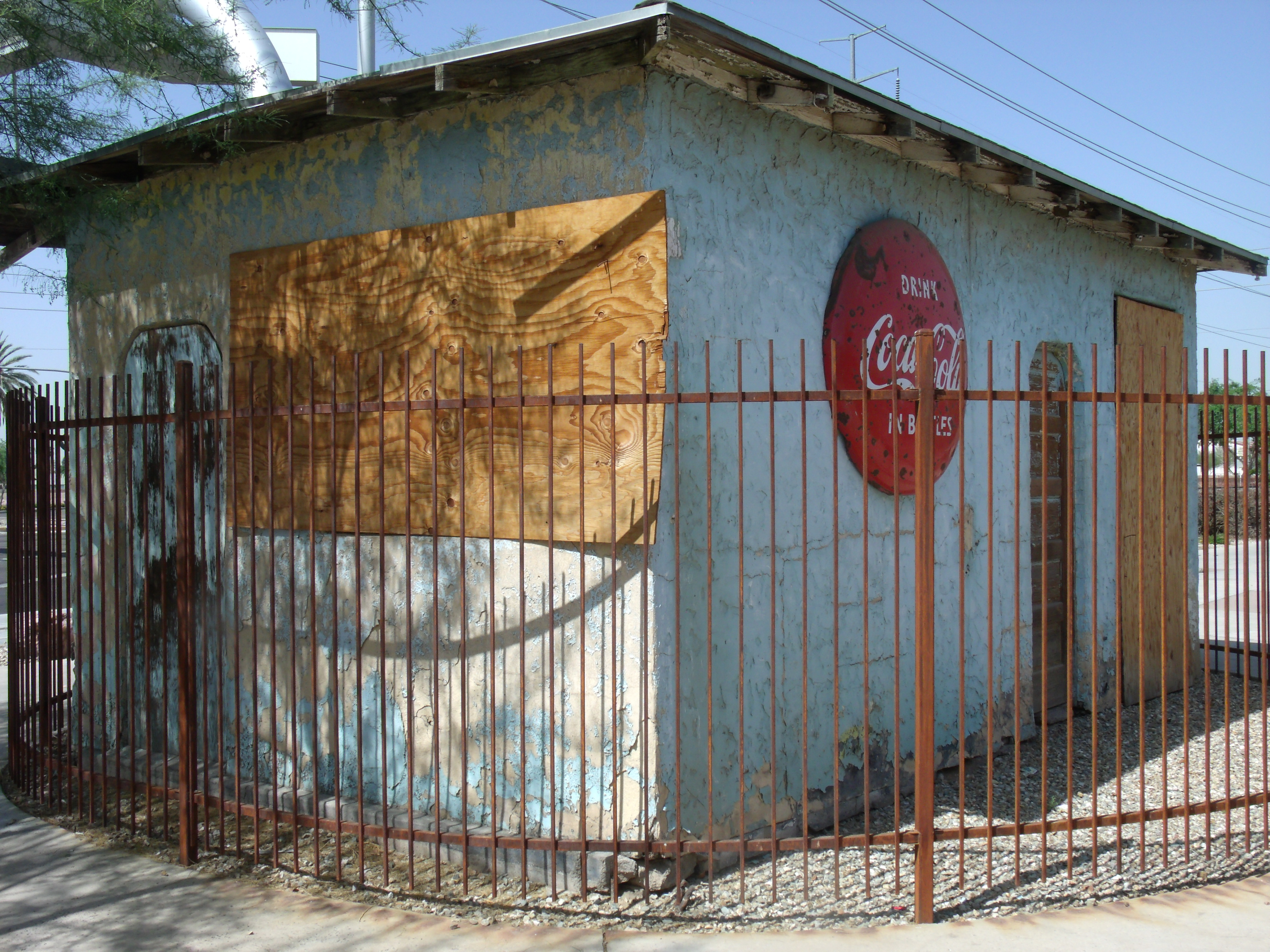
Back side of Morcomb's Service Station in 2010.

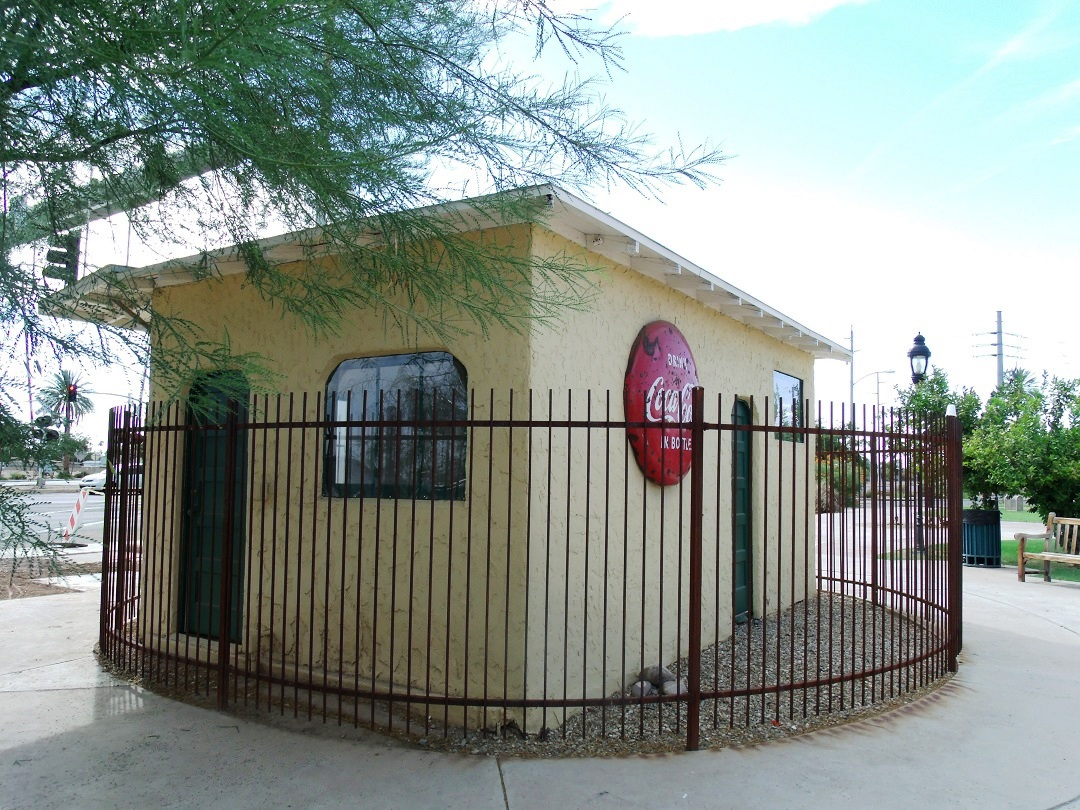
Back side of Morcomb's Service Station in 2013.

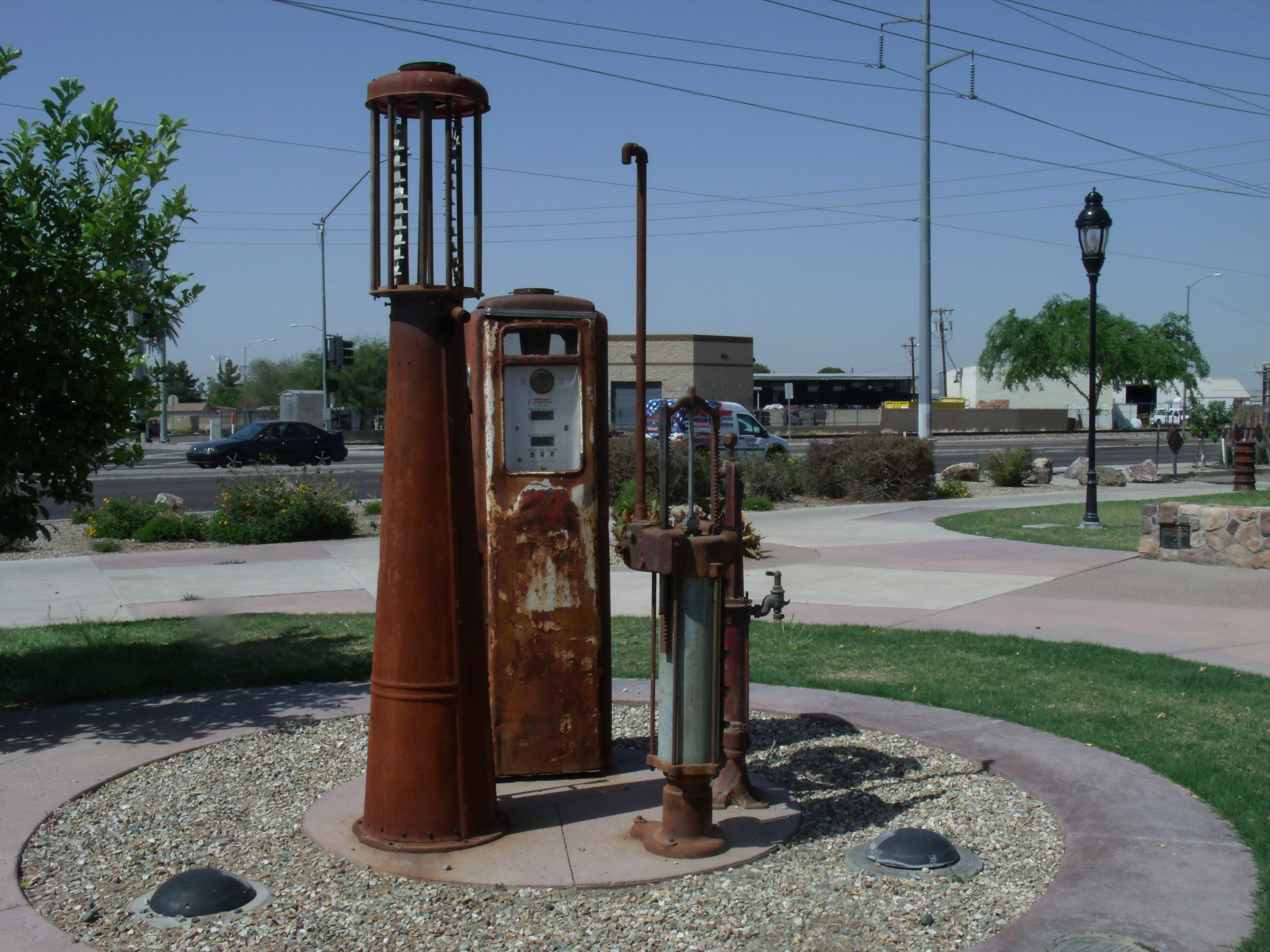
Gasoline pumps (1918 visi-bowl gas pump on the left).

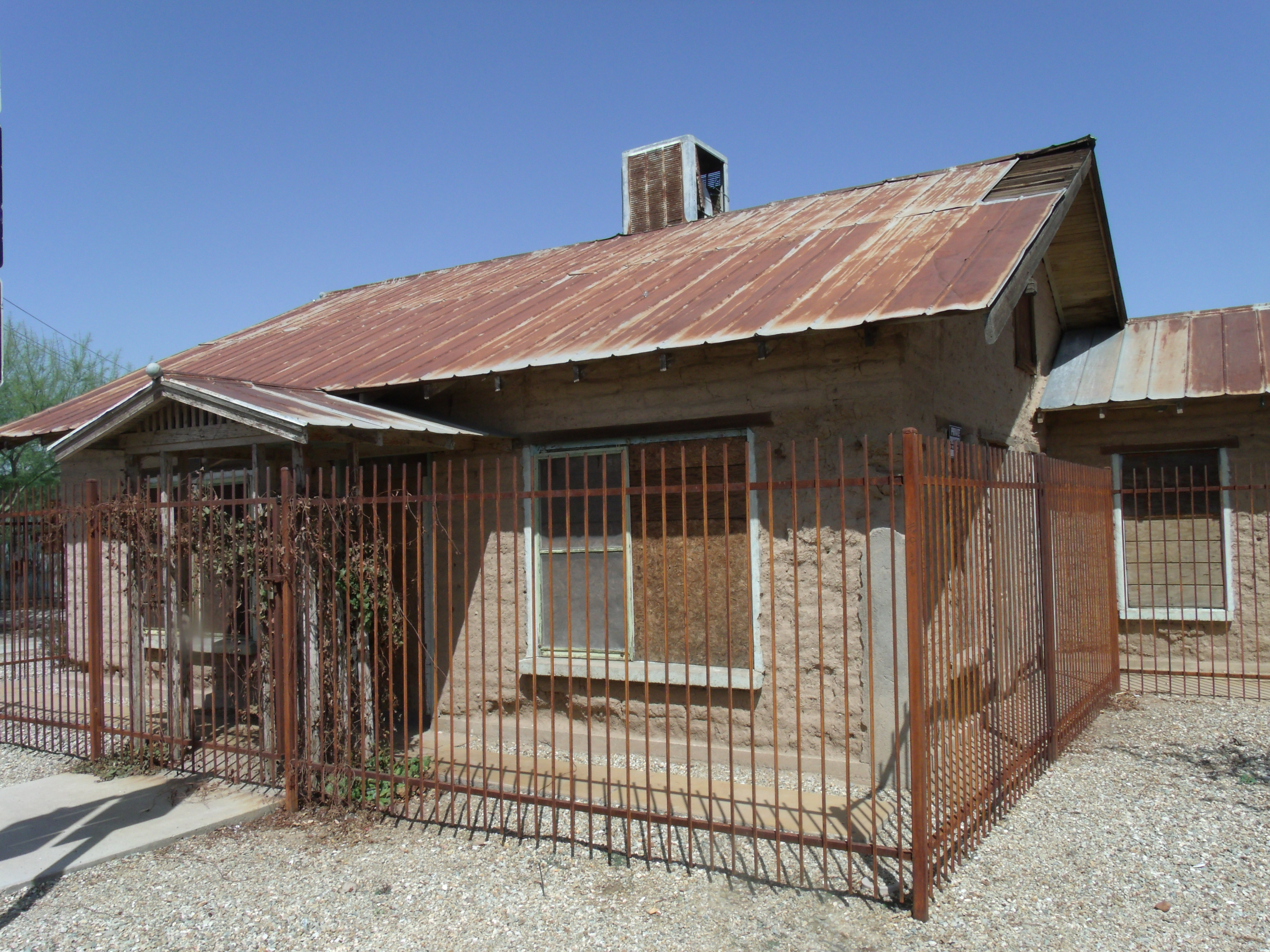
Morcomb's Family House.

== Houses of religious worship ==
The following houses of religious worship with a brief description are pictured:

- The First Methodist Episcopal Church of Glendale Sanctuary, built 1926. It is listed in the National Register of Historic Places.
- The abandoned First Southern Baptist Church Building built in 1920. It is listed as historical by the Glendale Arizona Historical Society. The building was demolished.
- The first Russian Molokans Church (Spiritual Christians) in Glendale built in 1950 and located at 7402 Griffin Ave. The structure was re-addressed as 6404 75th Ave. The first members of this religion arrived in Glendale in 1911. It was at one time the spiritual center for 200 families. It is listed as historical by the Glendale Arizona Historical Society.
Historical churches in Glendale, Arizona
(NRHP = National Register of Historic Places)
(GAHS=Glendale Arizona Historical Society)
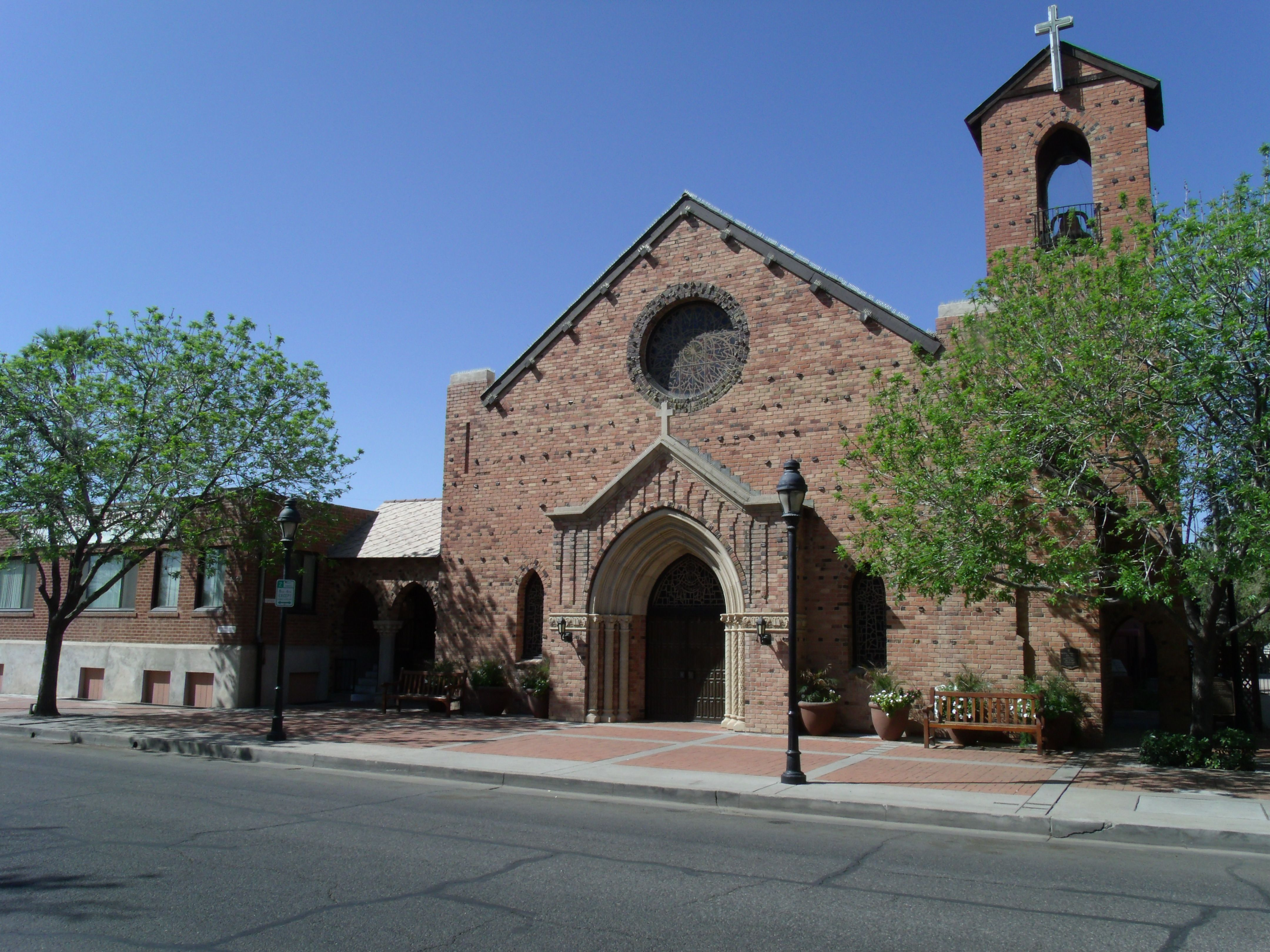
The First Methodist Episcopal Church of Glendale Sanctuary.

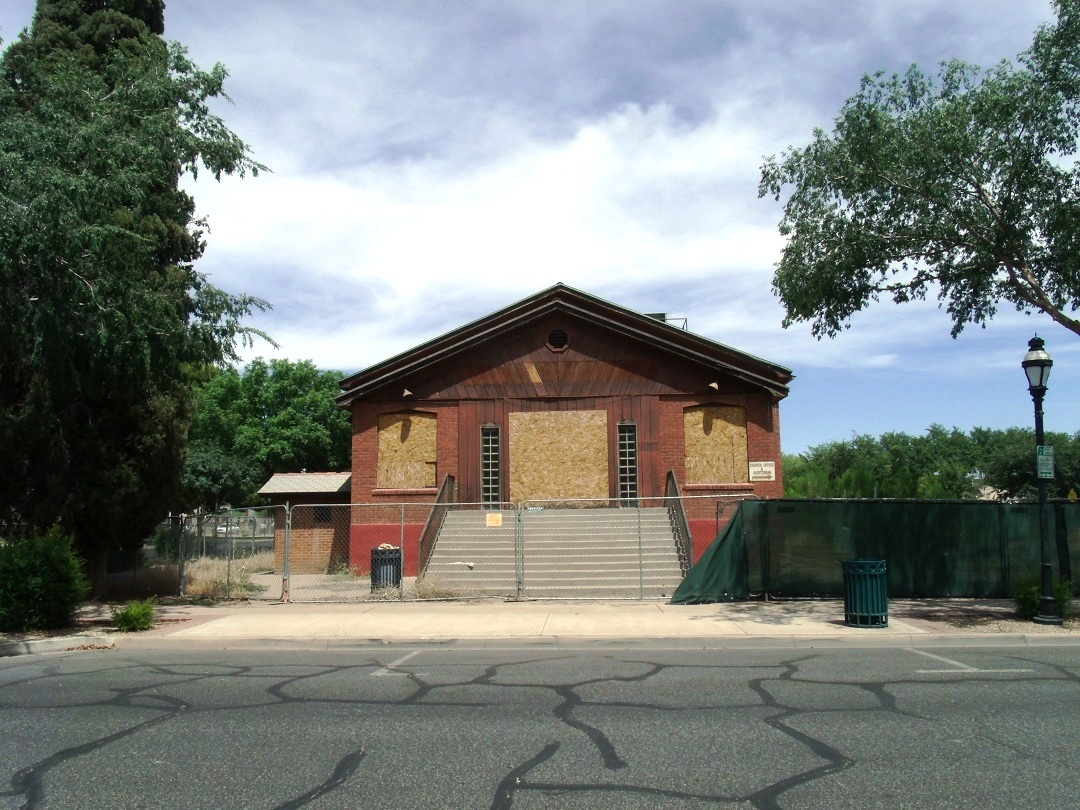
The old (c. 1920) abandoned First Southern Baptist Church Building which was eventually demolished.

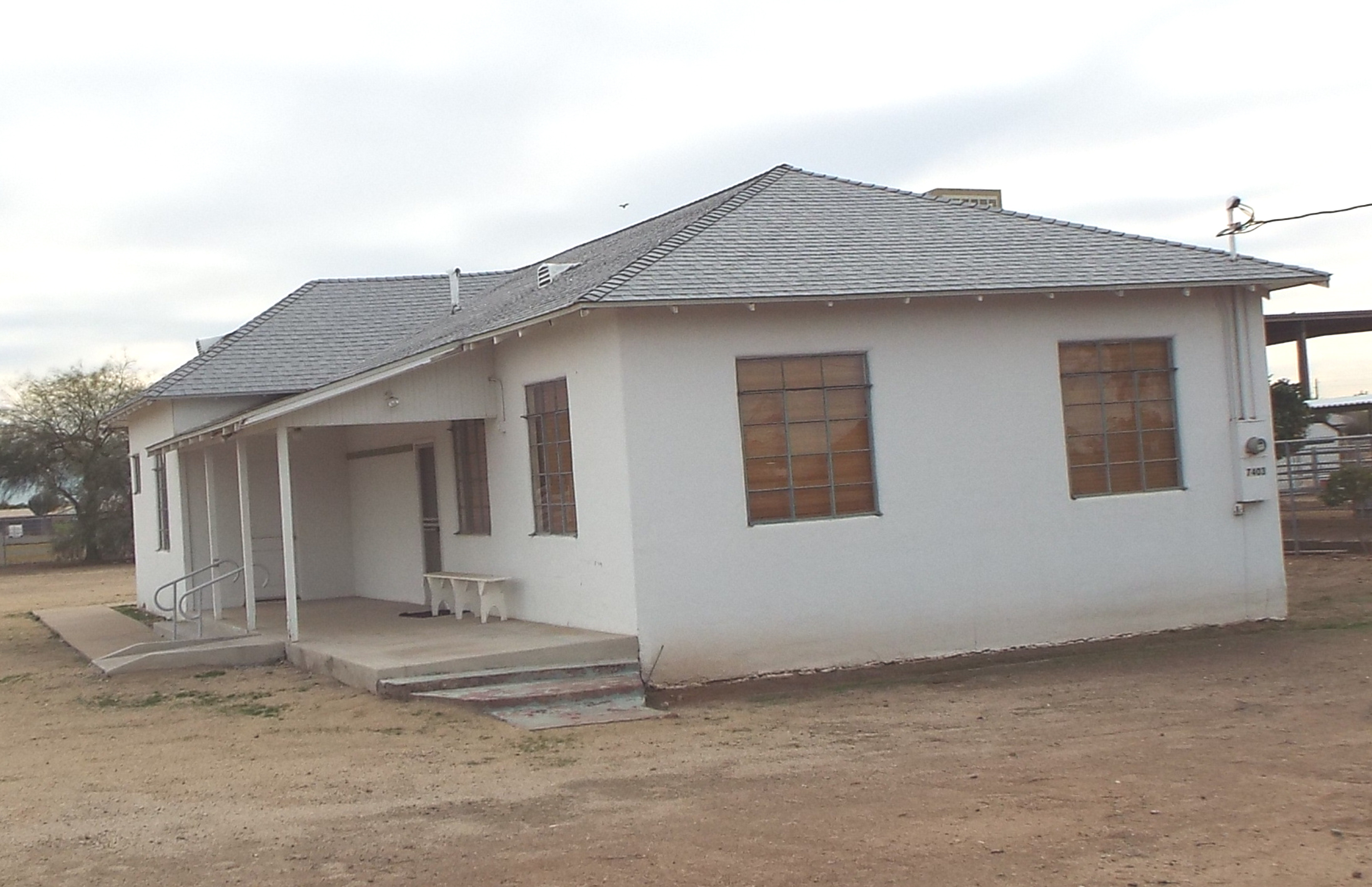
The first Russian Molokans Church (Spiritual Christians).

== Houses ==
The following houses which are pictured in this section with a brief description are considered historical by the National Register of Historic Places and /or the Glendale Historical Society. These houses are located outside the boundaries of the Catlin Court Historic District.

- The Forney House – It was built in 1893, is the second oldest house in Glendale, Arizona. It is located at 7534 North 61st Avenue. The oldest house in Glendale is the Adobe house located in Sahuaro Ranch.
- Jonas McNair House – It was built in 1897 and is located at 5919 W. Myrtle Avenue. It is listed in the National Register of Historic Places.
- The E.C. Bunch House – It was built in 1898 and is located at 5602 West Lamar Road. It is listed in the National Register of Historic Places.
- The C.C. Burkholder House – It was built in 1898 and is located at 7402 N. 61st Ave. C.C. Burkholder was a pioneer and the minister for the River Brethren Church.
- The William Weigold House – It was built in 1910 and is located at 6101 W. Palmarie Ave. W. Weigold was one of the first directors of the Glendale State Bank. The property is listed in the Glendale Historic Building Survey, City of Glendale, 1980.
- The Ray Wiegold House – It was built in 1910 and is located at 6115 W. Palmarie Ave. Ray Weigold was a building contractor. His brother William was one of the first directors of the Glendale State Bank. The property is listed in the Glendale Historic Building Survey, City of Glendale, 1980.
- The Nunez House – The original structure was built in 1912. The house is located at 6701 N. 55th Drive. It is among the first houses built in what was known as “Mexican Town” in Glendale, Arizona. “Mexican Town” came about as a result of the migration of people from Mexico and of Mexican descent who settled in that section of Glendale with the opening of the Beet Sugar Factory in 1906. The property is listed in the Glendale Historic Building Survey, City of Glendale, 1980.
- The W.C. Welsh Rental House – It was built in 1912 and is located at 7304 61st Ave. Welsh came to Glendale in 1906 and built several rental houses. The property is listed in the Glendale Historic Building Survey, City of Glendale, 1980.
- The First Baptist Church Parsonage House – It was built in 1919 and is located at 7141 N. 57th Ave. Reverend C.M. Northrup was the first pastor to reside in the house. Listed as historic by the Glendale Historic Building Survey.
- The Methodist Church Parsonage House – built in 1898, was moved to 7142 N. 58th Avenue and is now an antique store.
- The Dominic Sanita House – It was built in 1924 and is located at 7102 N. 55th Drive. Dominic Sanita was a prominent businessman in Glendale, Arizona. The property is listed in the Glendale Historic Building Survey, City of Glendale, 1980.
- The George O'Dowdy Rental Cottage – It was built in 1926 and is located at 6818 N. 60th Avenue. It is listed in the National Register of Historic Places.
- The Collins House – It was built in 1930 and is located at 5803 W. Northview Ave. The house is listed in the Glendale Historic Building Survey of 1980.
- The Cook-Chisum House – It was built in 1931 and is located at 5962 W. Northview Avenue. The Dutch Colonial Revival style of the house popularized by Dutch colonists in parts of New York and New Jersey in the early 1900s. The house is located in the Floralcroft Historic District which was listed in the National Register of Historic Places on April 6, 2006, reference: #05001505. It is also listed as historic by the Glendale Historic Building Survey.
- The Jack Shawver House, now known as the Keist Office Building – It was built in 1952 and is located at 7508 North 59th Avenue, in the 59th Ave.. This Ranch style home was built outside any platted subdivision by Jack Shawver, partner of the Shawver Brothers Tillage Company. It is in the Northfield Historic District which was listed in the National Register of Historic Places on May 10, 2010, reference: #10000234. Listed as historic by the Glendale Historic Building Survey.
- The Melvin E. Sine House – It was built in 1957 and is located at 7307 N. 50th Drive. It is within the Glendale Gardens Historic District listed in the National Register of Historic Places, ref. 11001073.
- The Evan Mecham House – It was built in 1960 and is located at 5741 West Harmont Drive. Evan Mecham served as the 17th Governor of Arizona from January 5, 1987, to April 4, 1988, when he was impeached. The house is located in the Thunderbird Estates/ McDonald Addition Historic District.
Historical houses in Glendale, Arizona
(NRHP = National Register of Historic Places)
(GAHS=Glendale Arizona Historical Society)
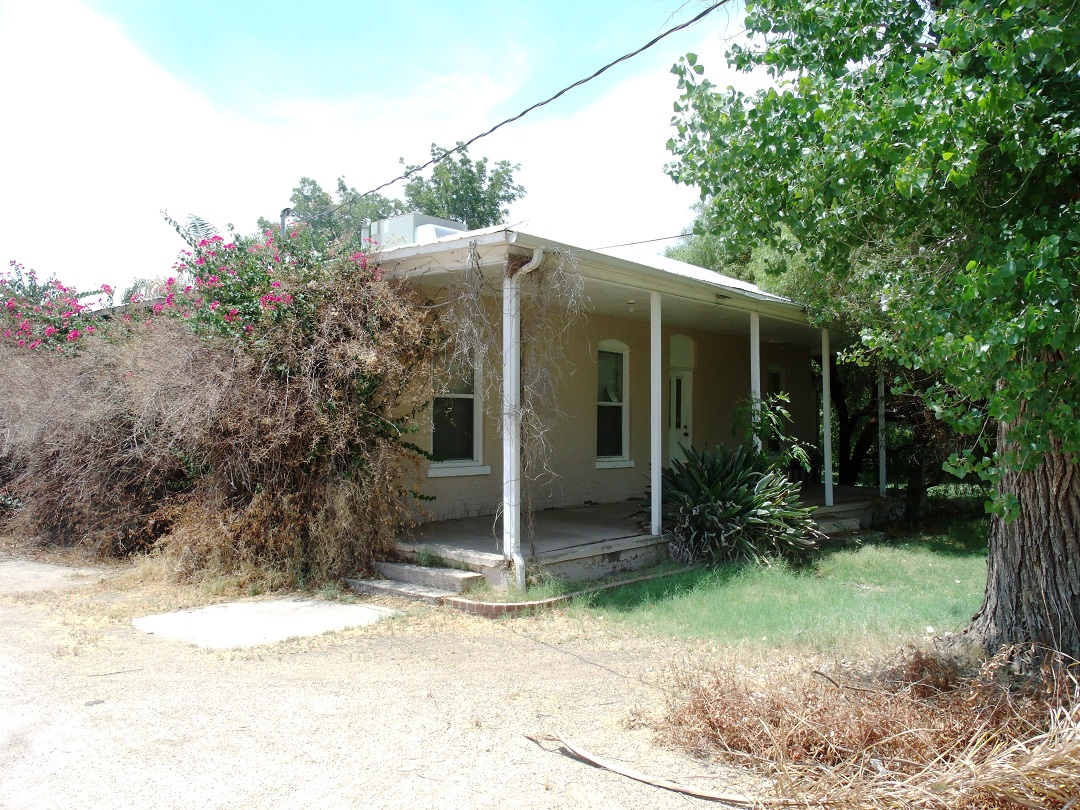
The Forney House.

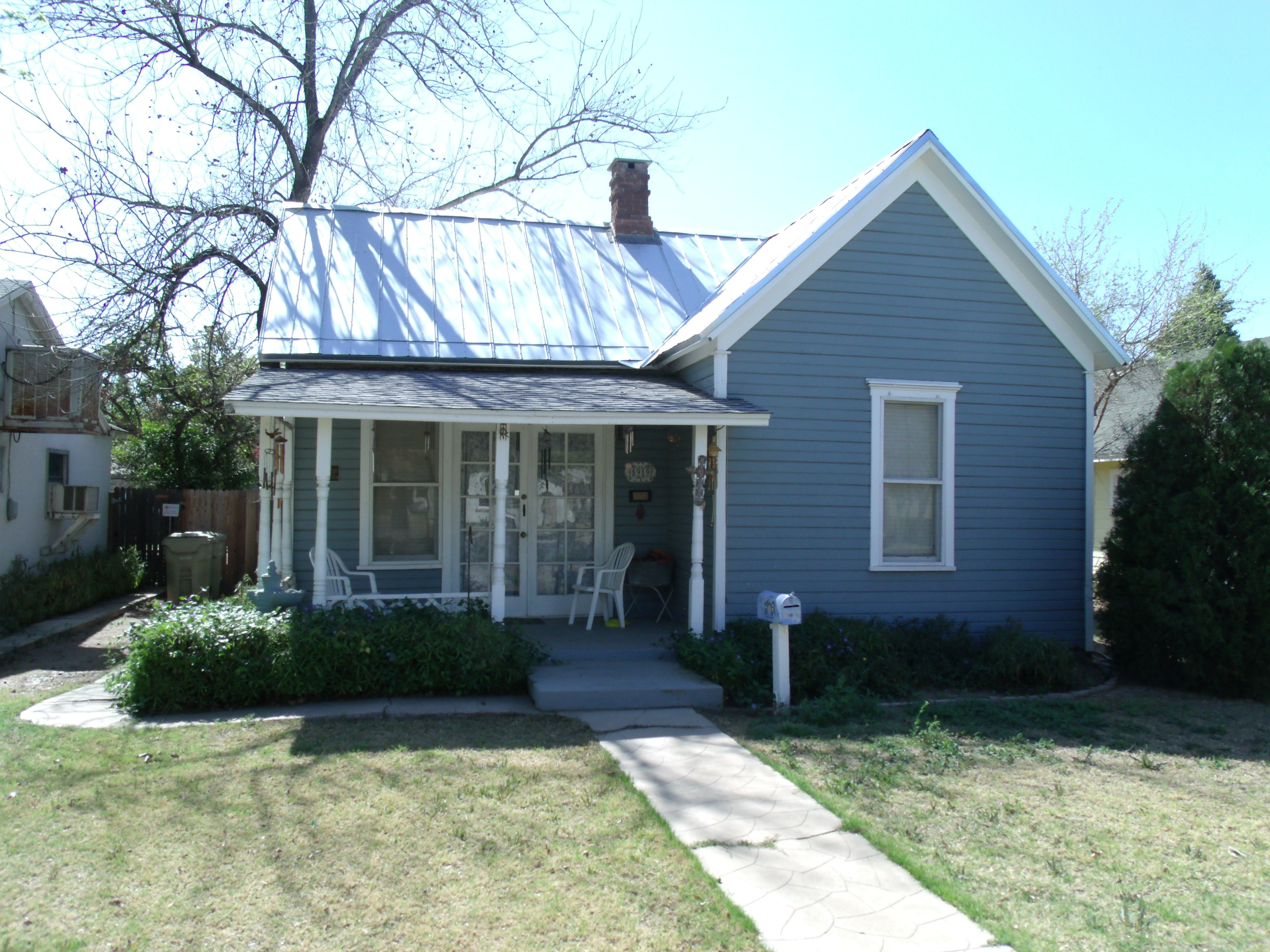
The Jonas McNair House.

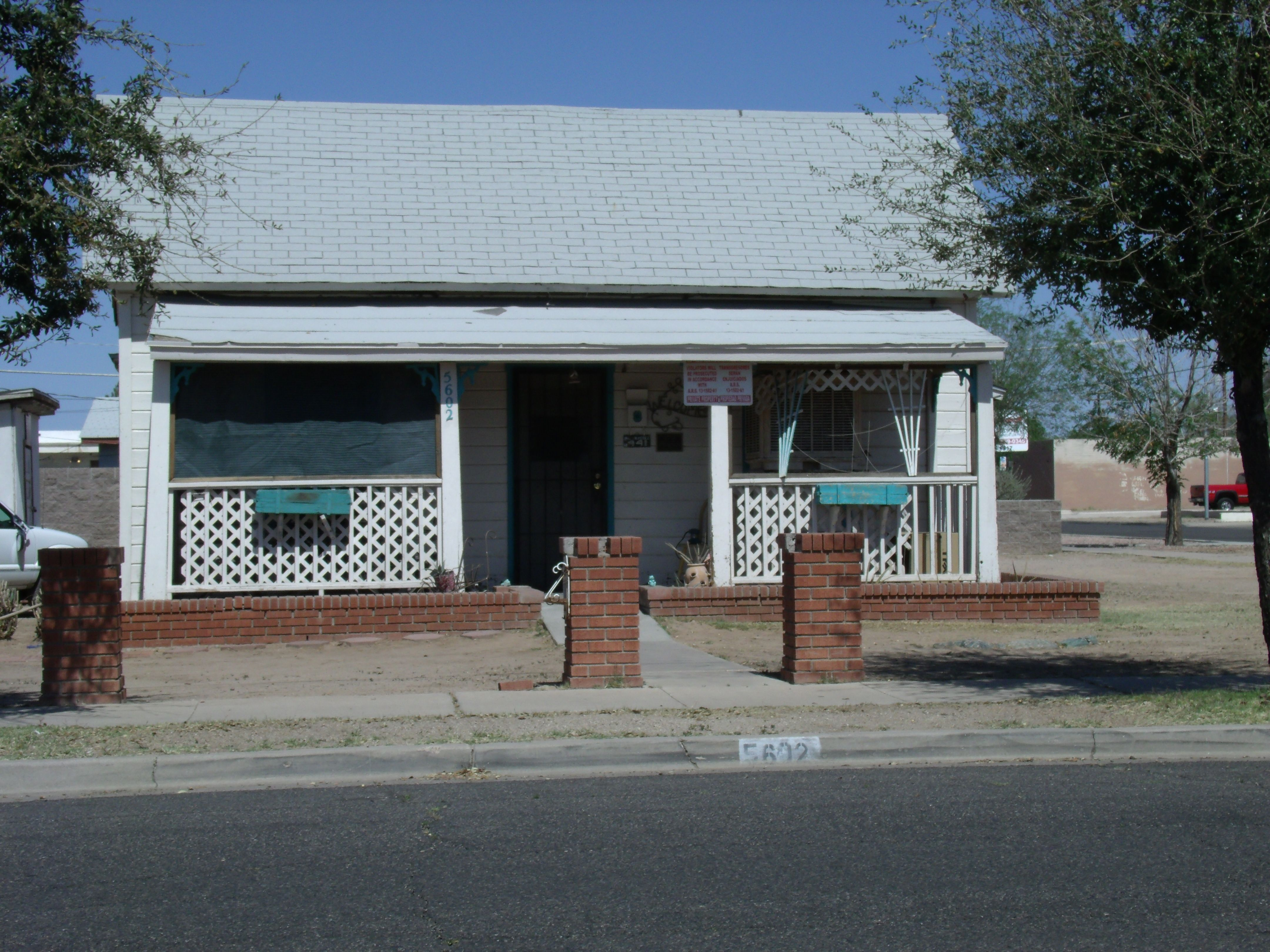
The E.C. Bunch House.

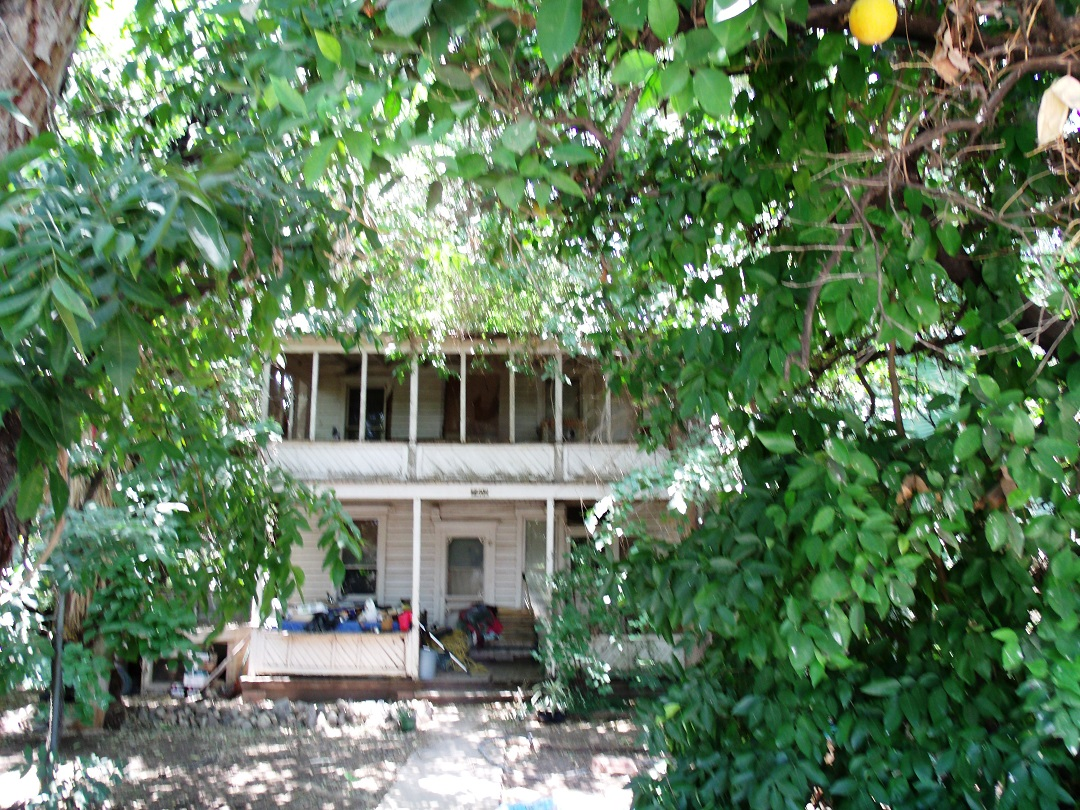
The C.C. Burkholder House.

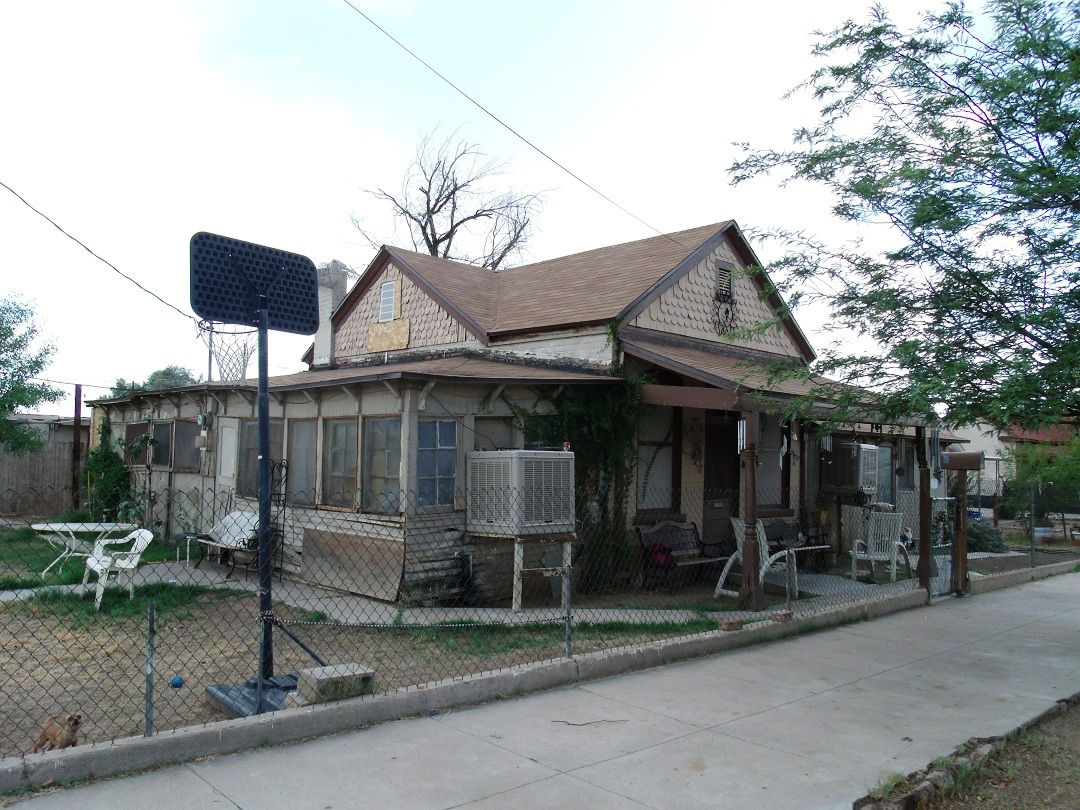
The William Weigold House.

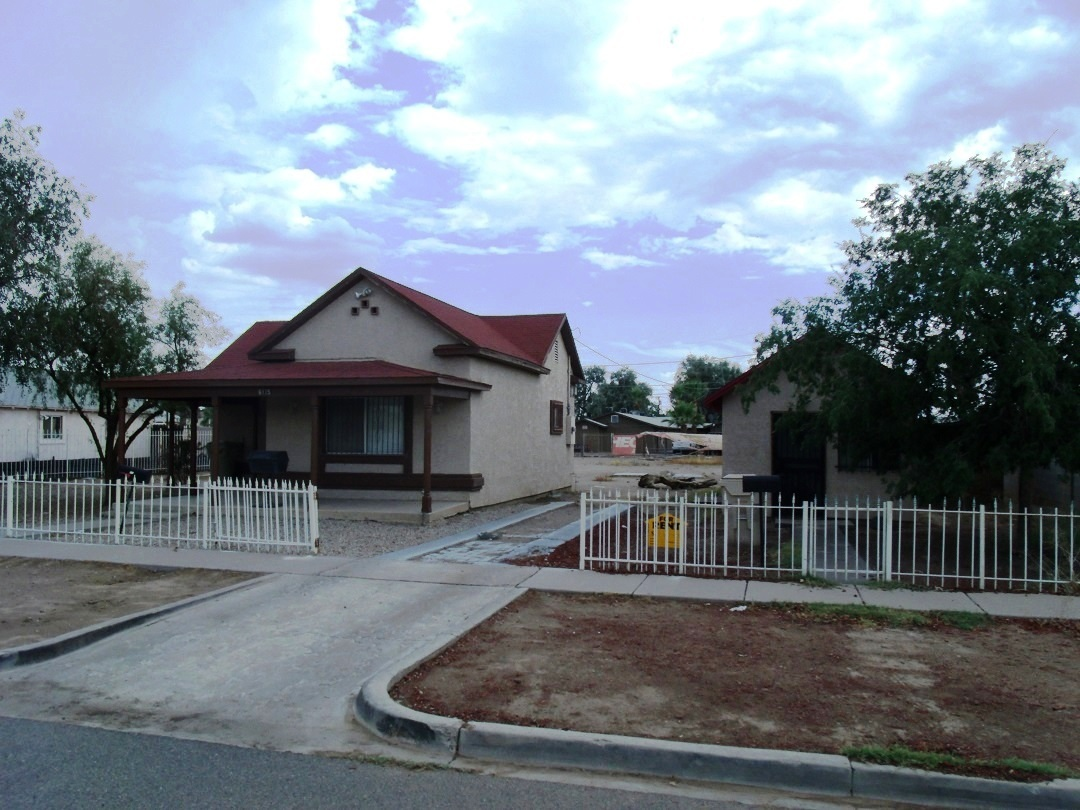
The Ray Wiegold House.

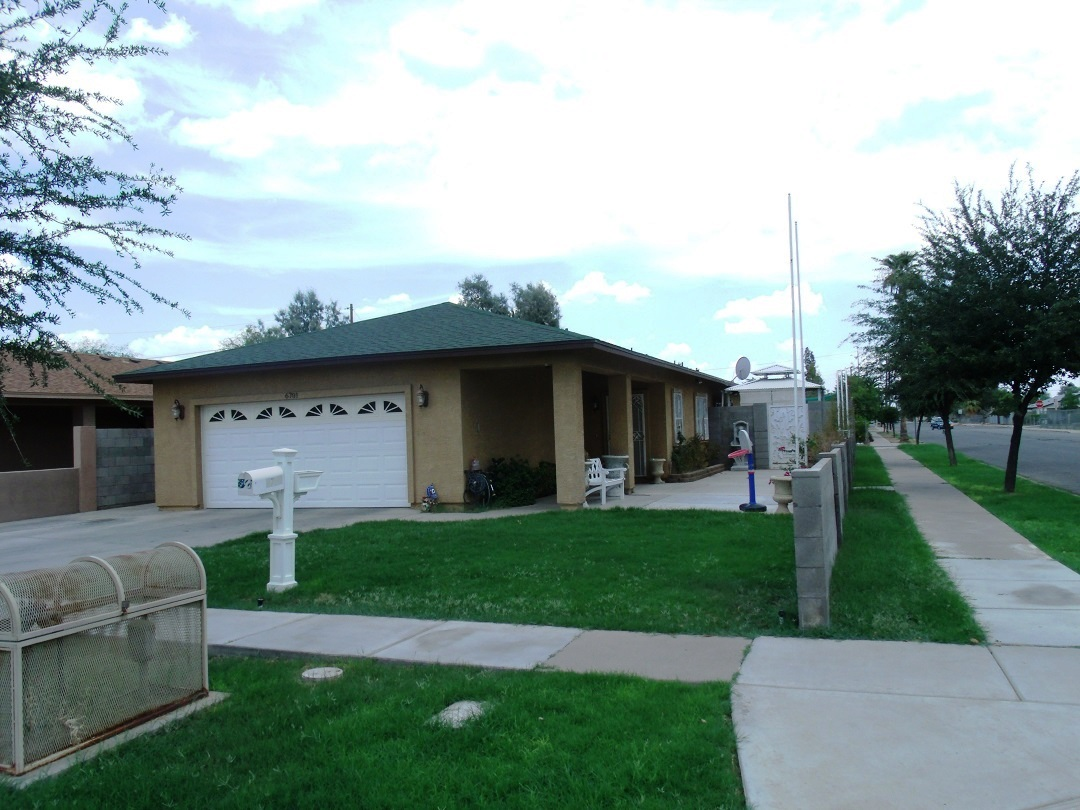
The Nunez House.

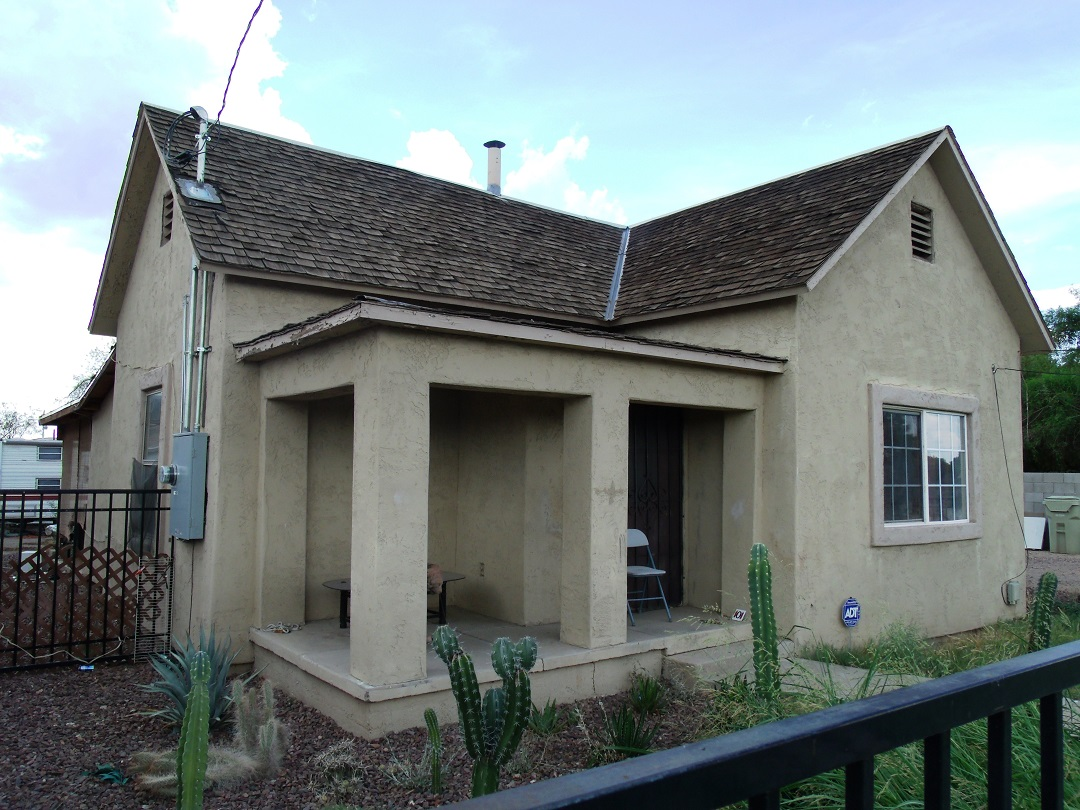
The W.C. Welsh Rental House.

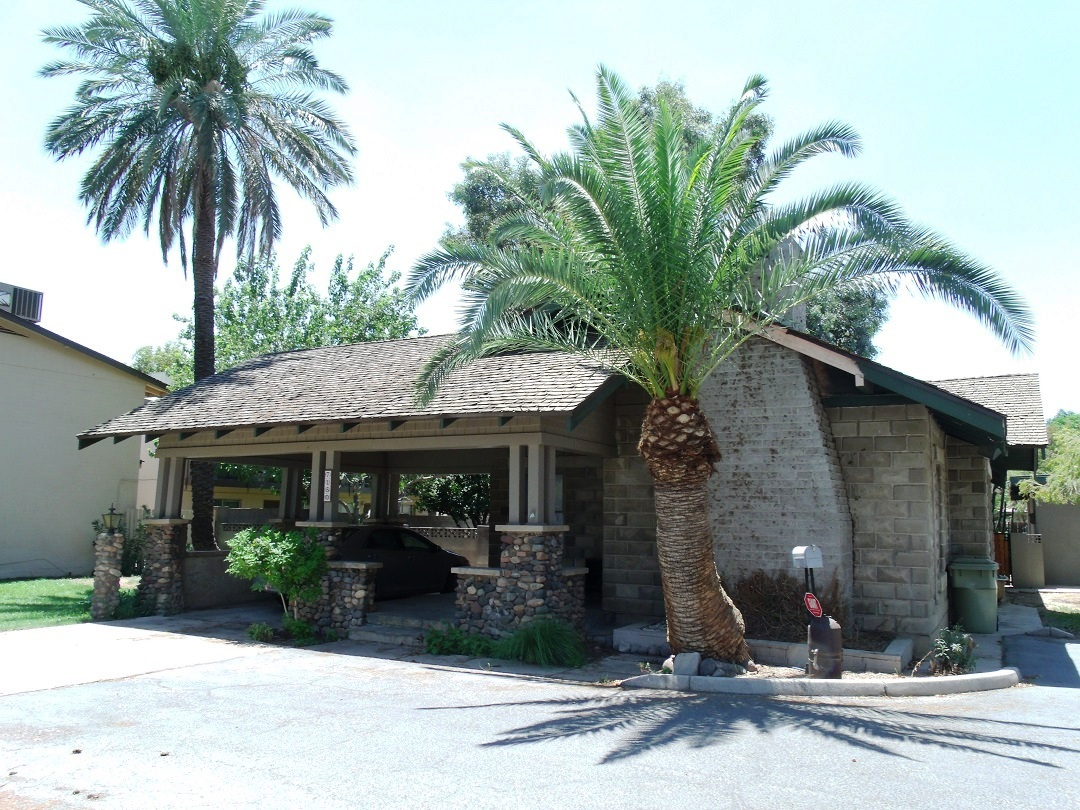
The First Baptist Church Parsonage House.

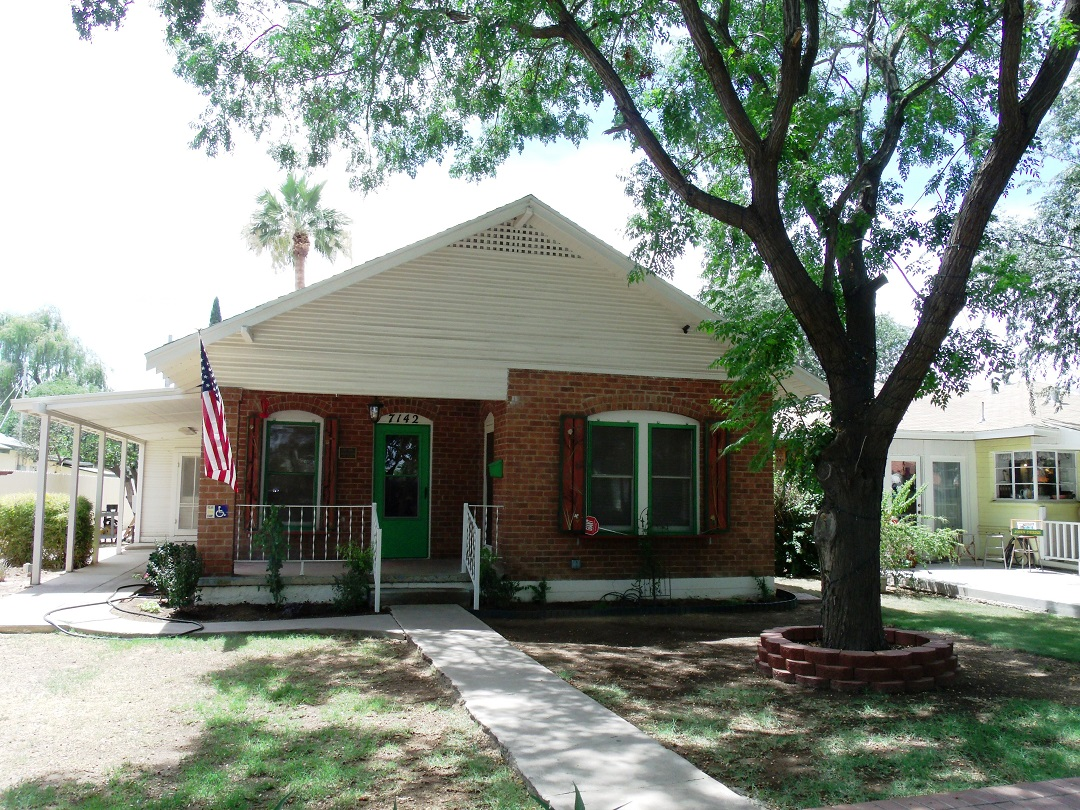
Methodist Church Parsonage House

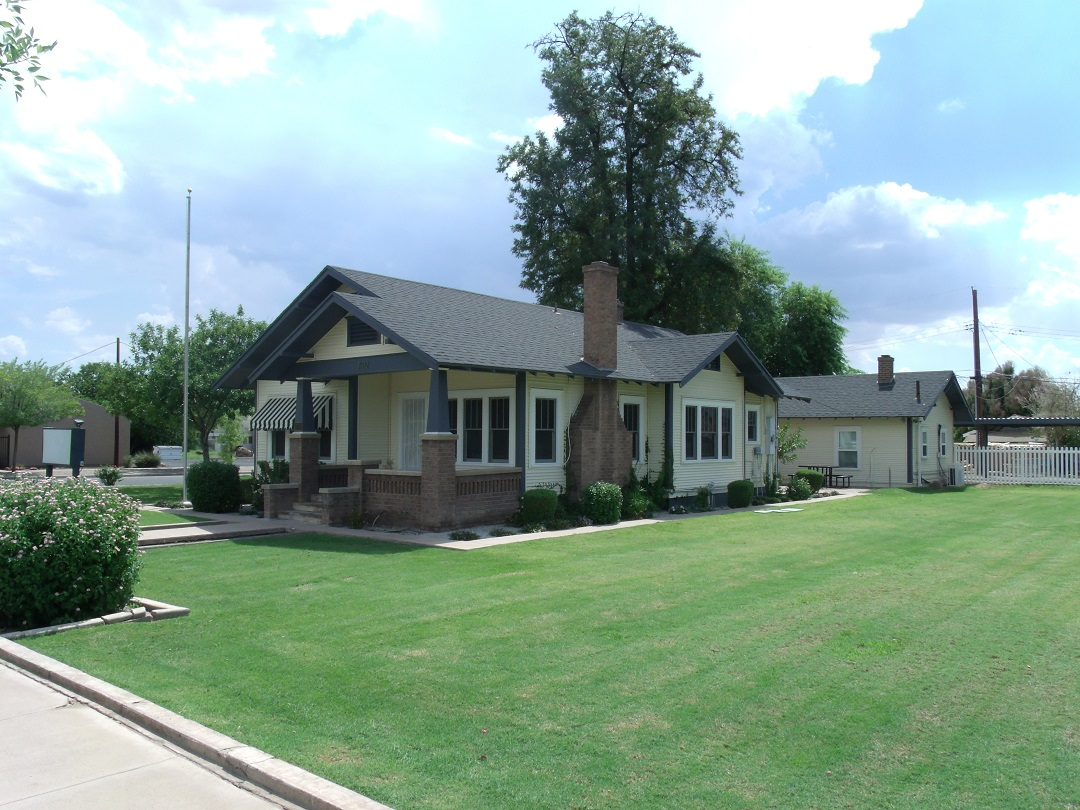
The Dominic Sanita House.

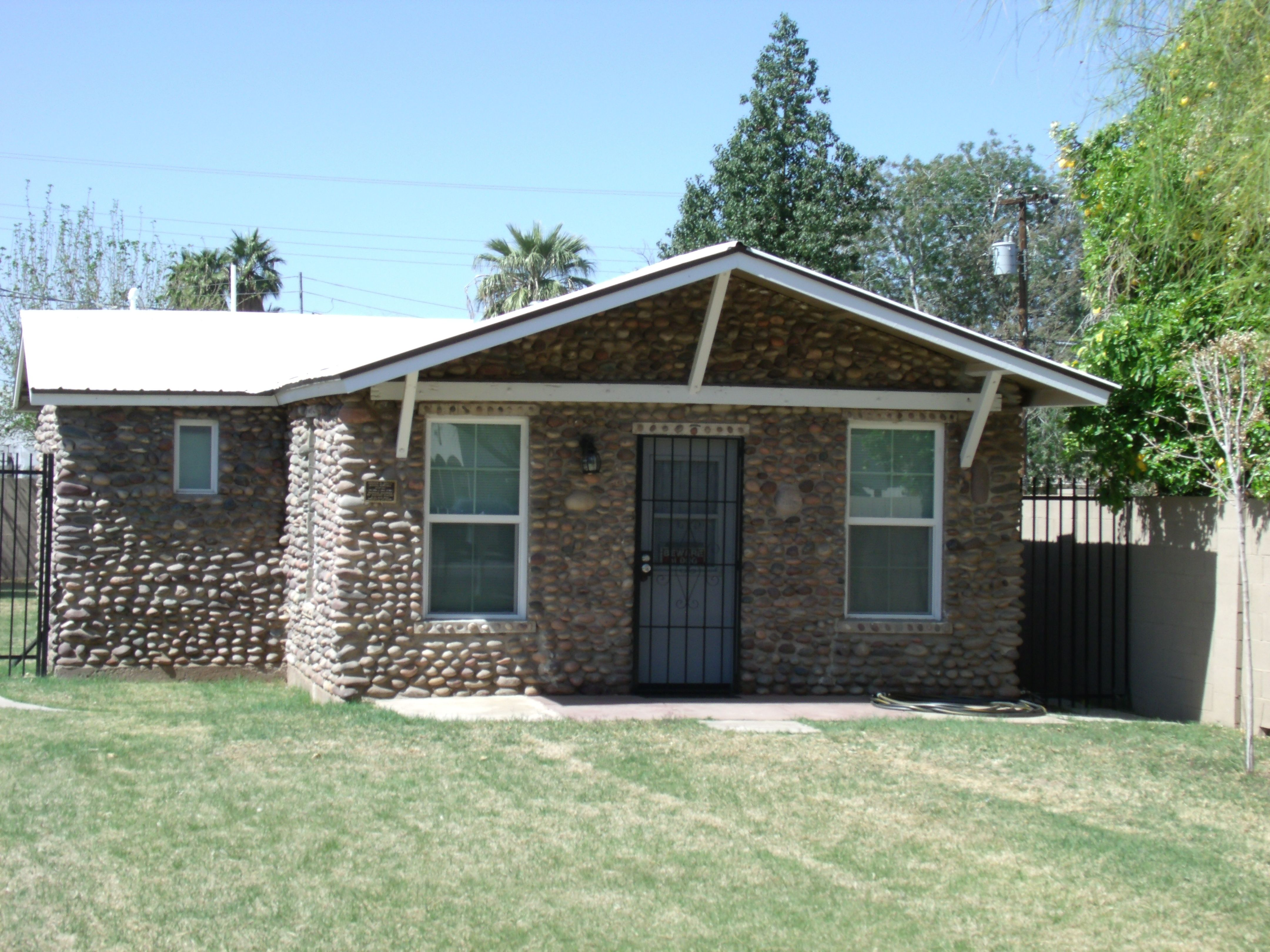
The George O'Dowdy Rental Cottage.

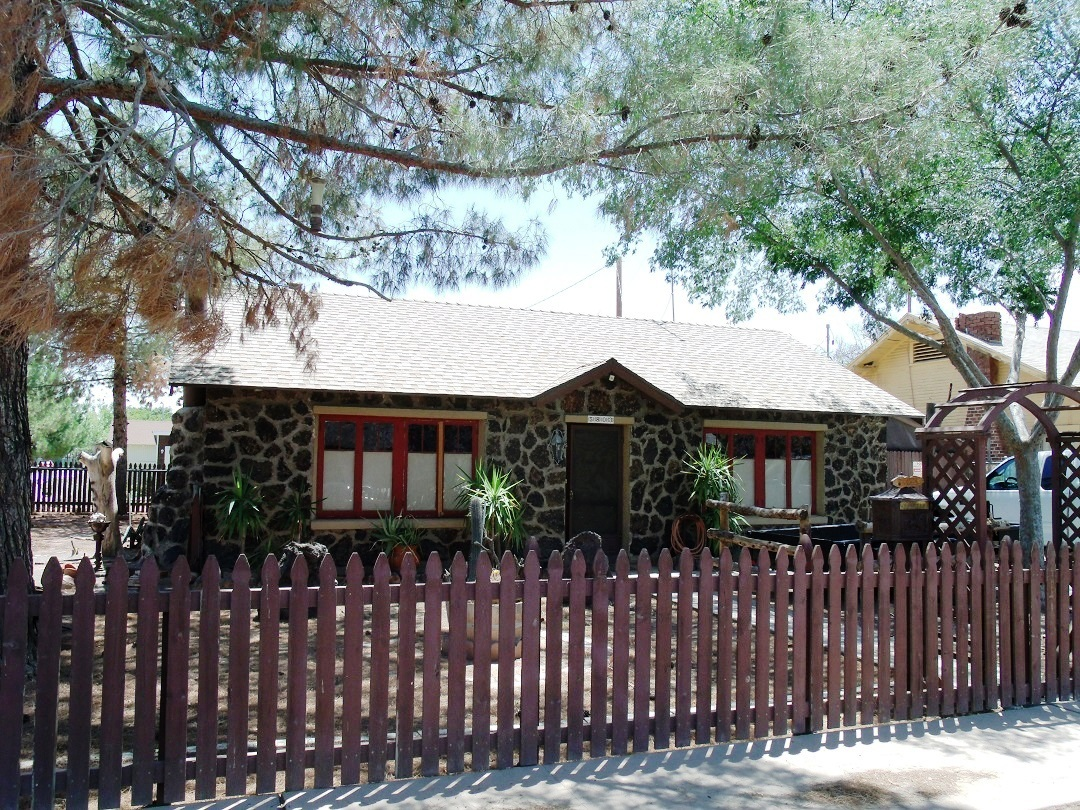
The Collins House.

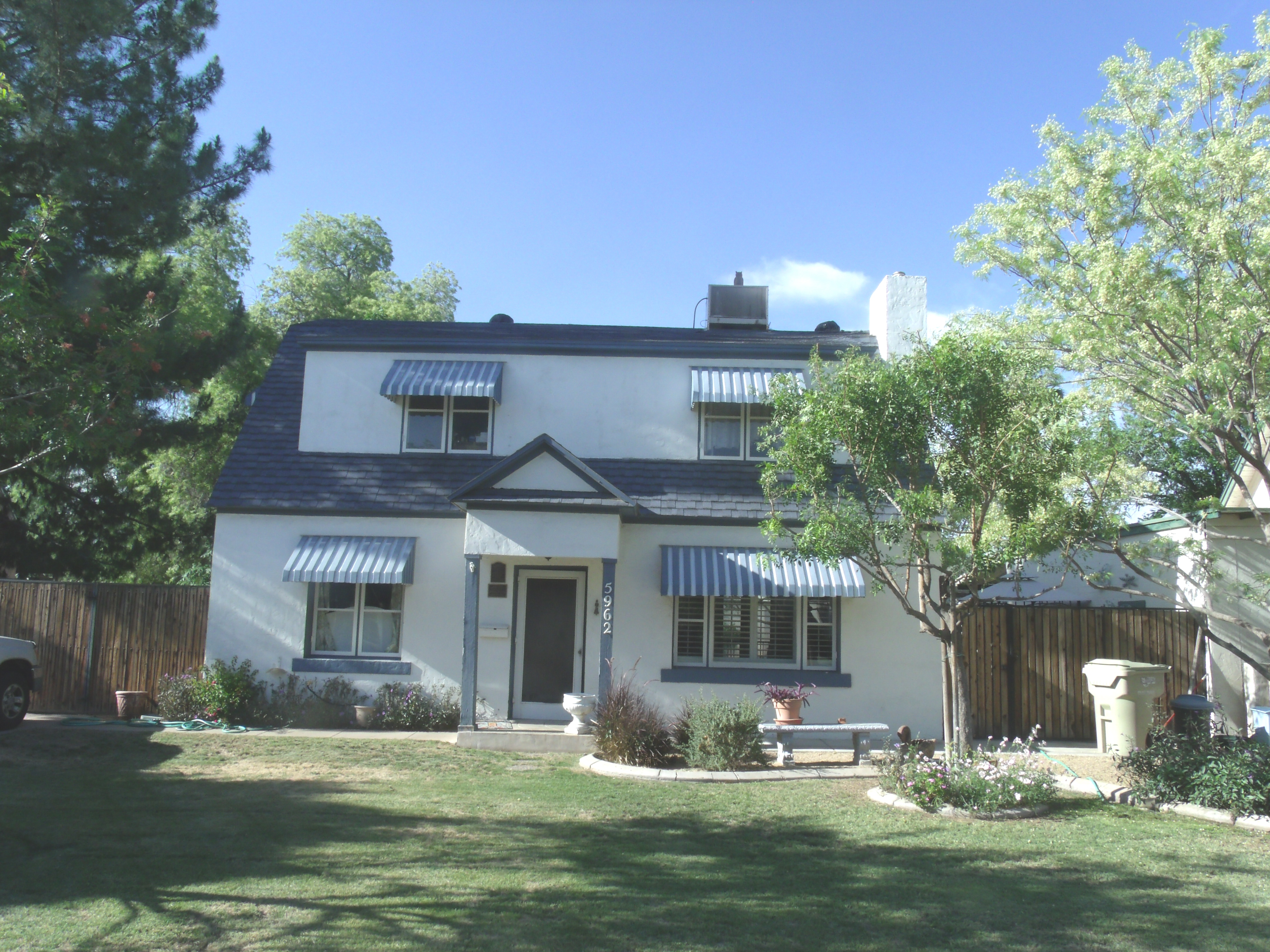
The Cook-Chisum House.

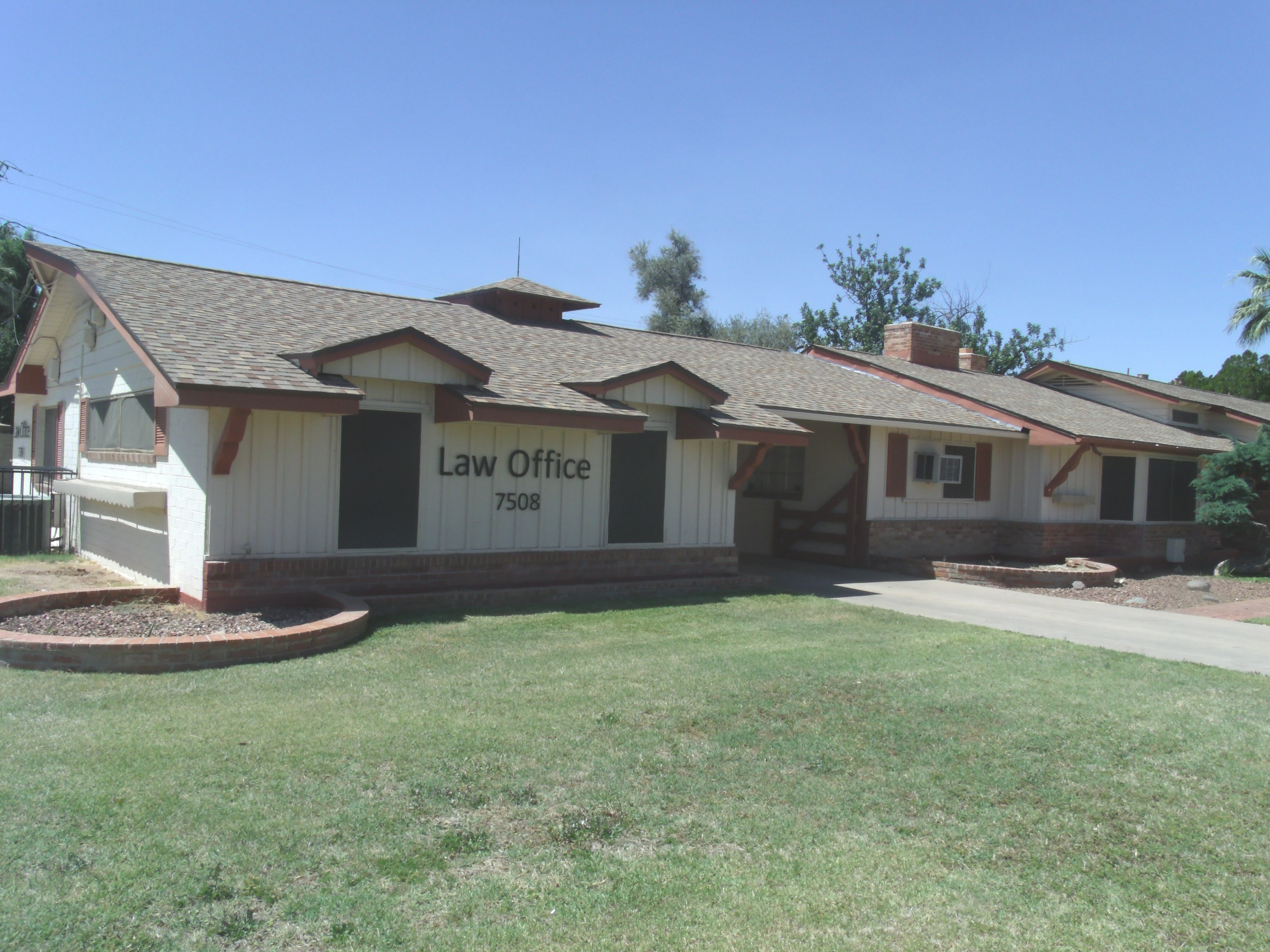
The Jack Shawver House, now known as the Keist Office Building.

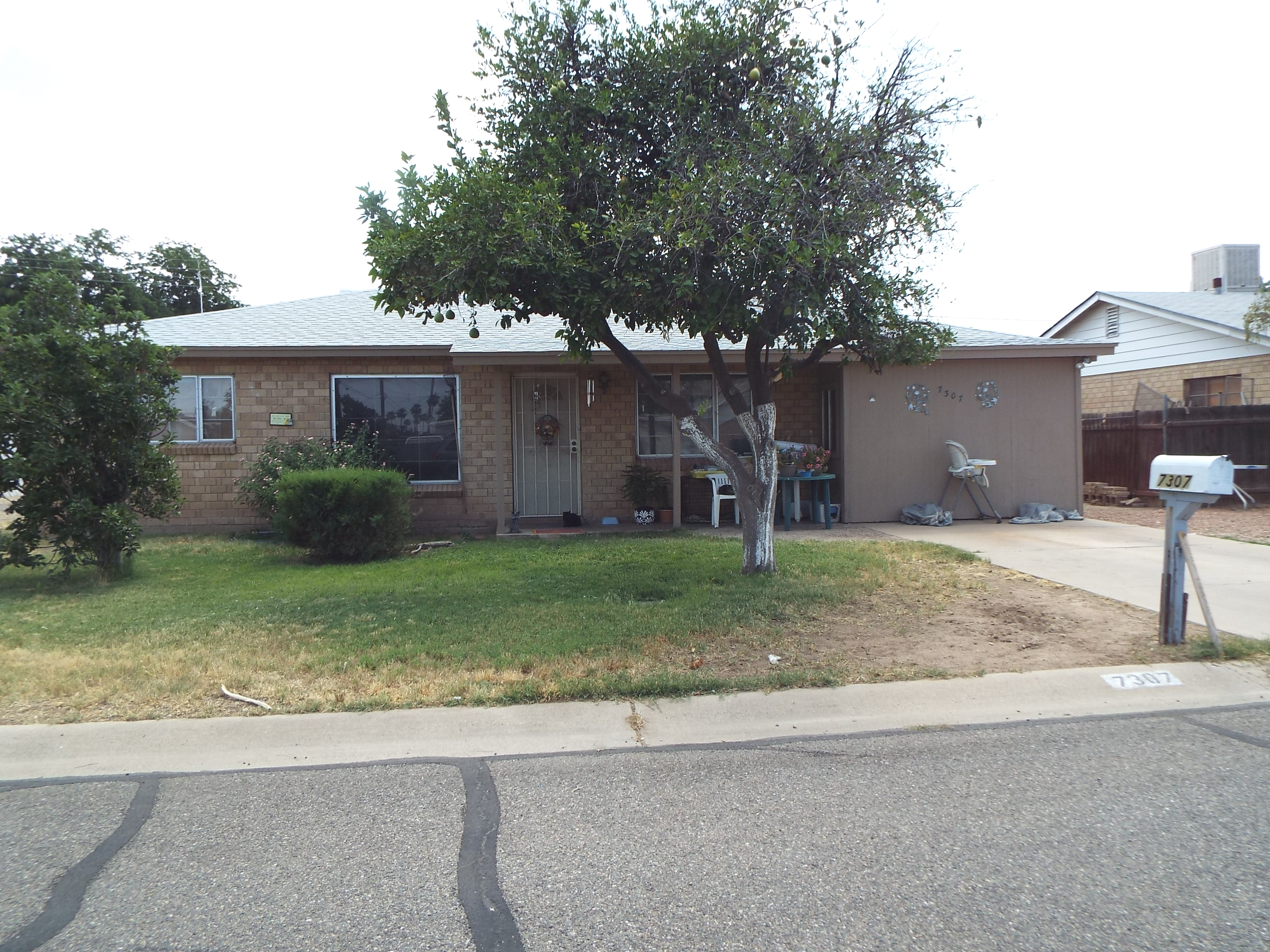
The Melvin E. Sine House.

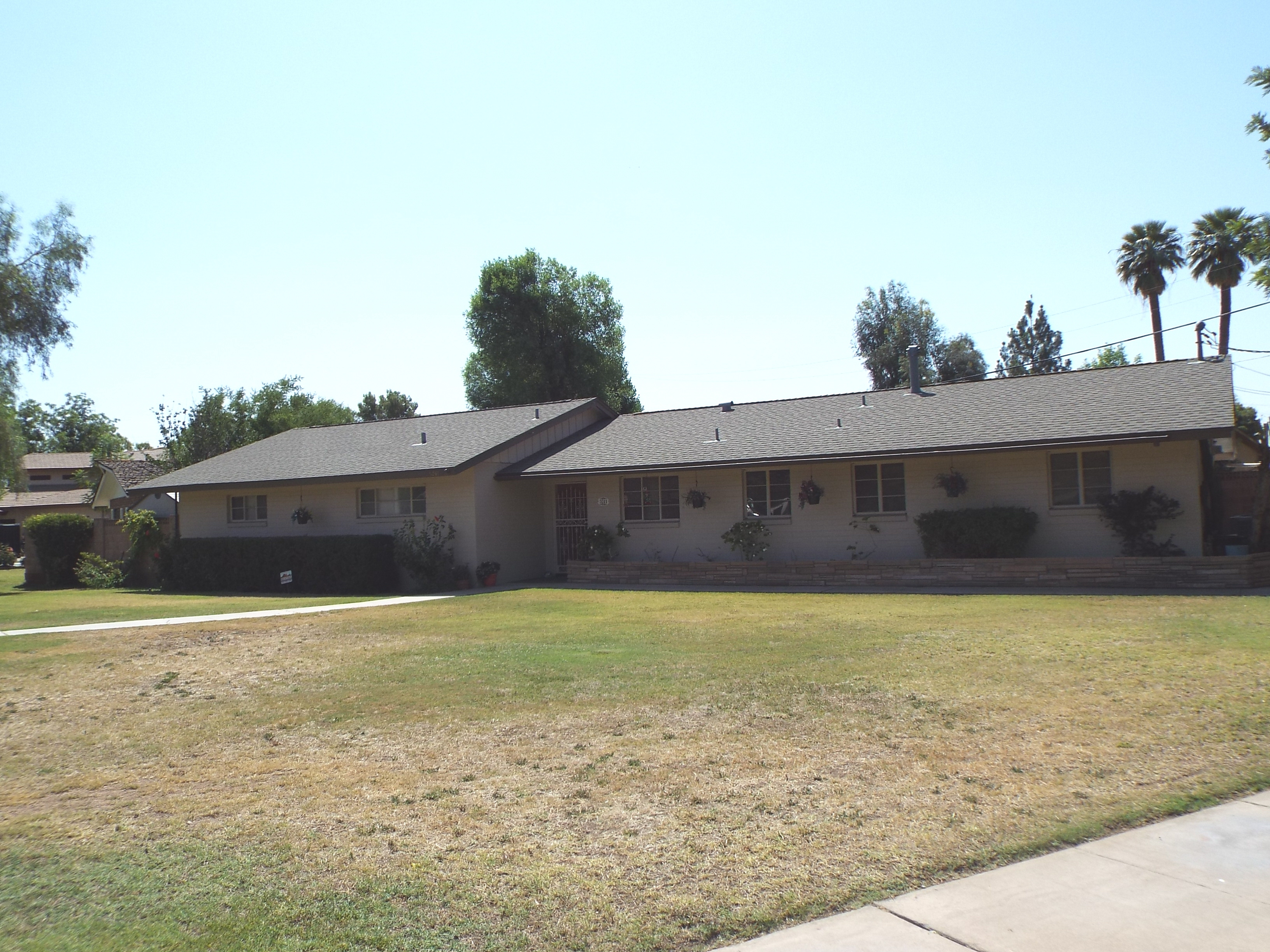
The Evan Mecham House.

== Ranches ==
Historic ranches in Glendale, Arizona.

Manistee Ranch
(NRHP = National Register of Historic Places)
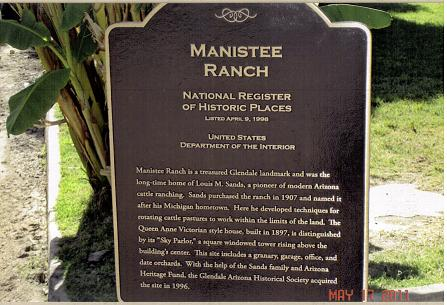
National Register of Historic Places Marker in Manistee Ranch.

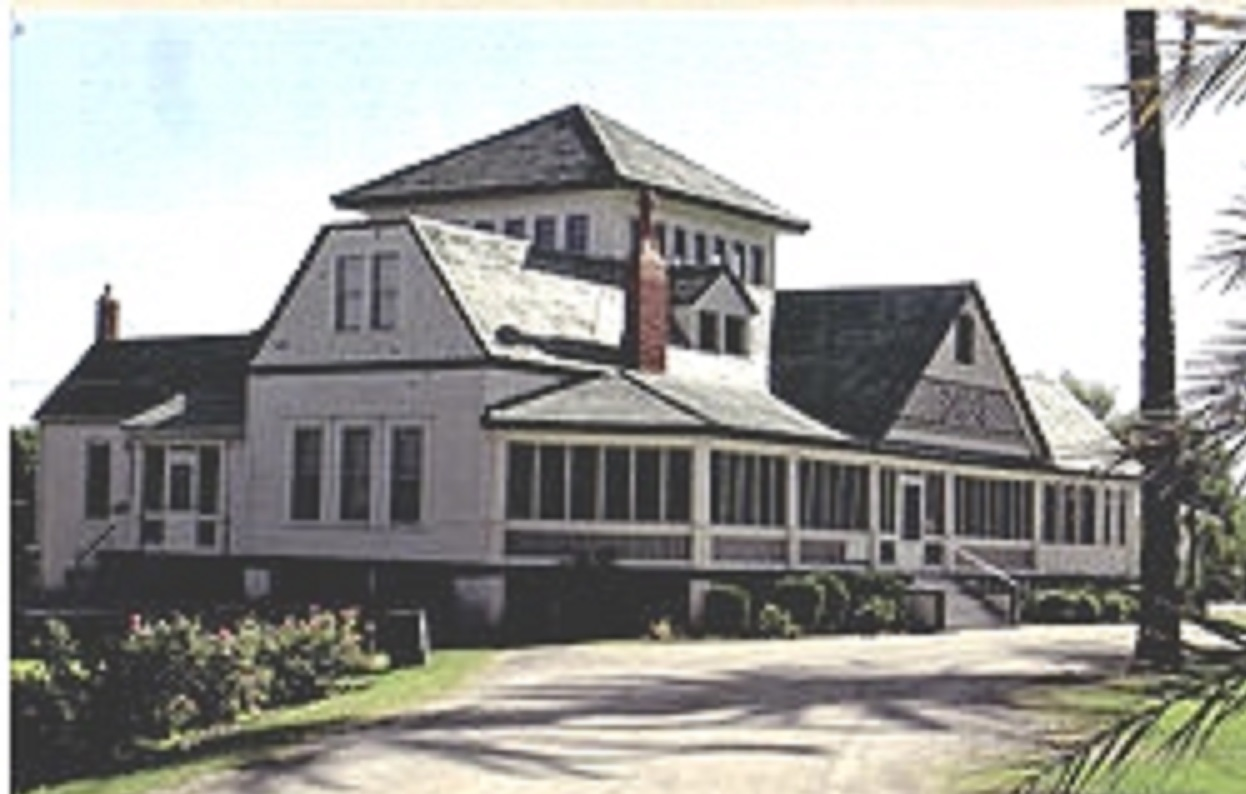
Main mansion of the Manistee Ranch, built in 1897

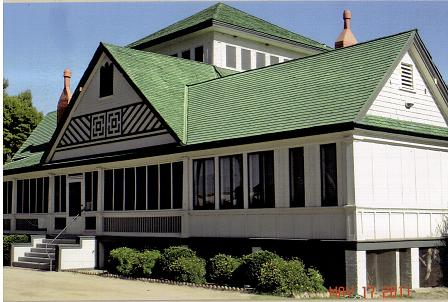
Different view of the Manistee Ranch main mansion

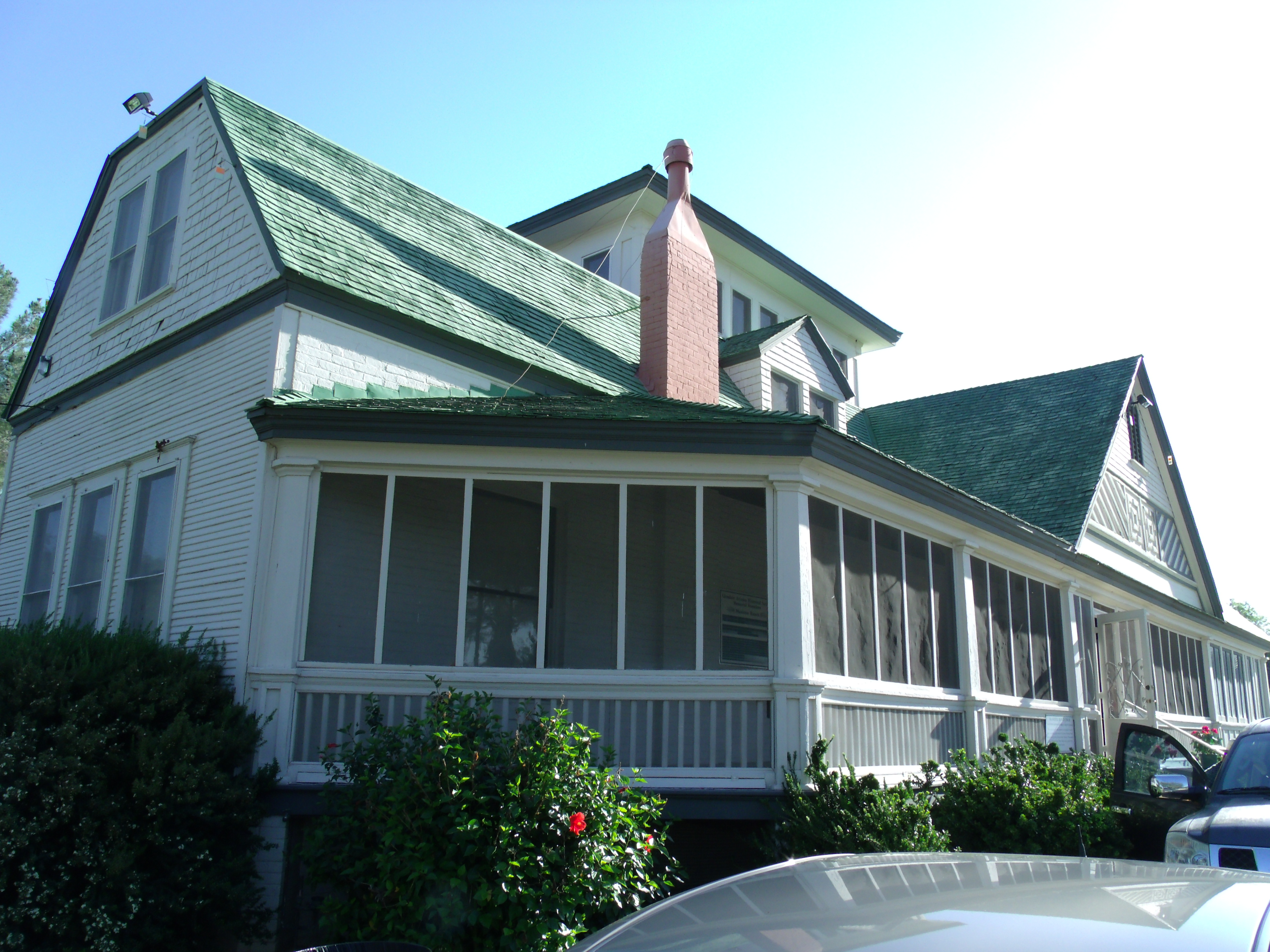
Different view of the Manistee Mansion.

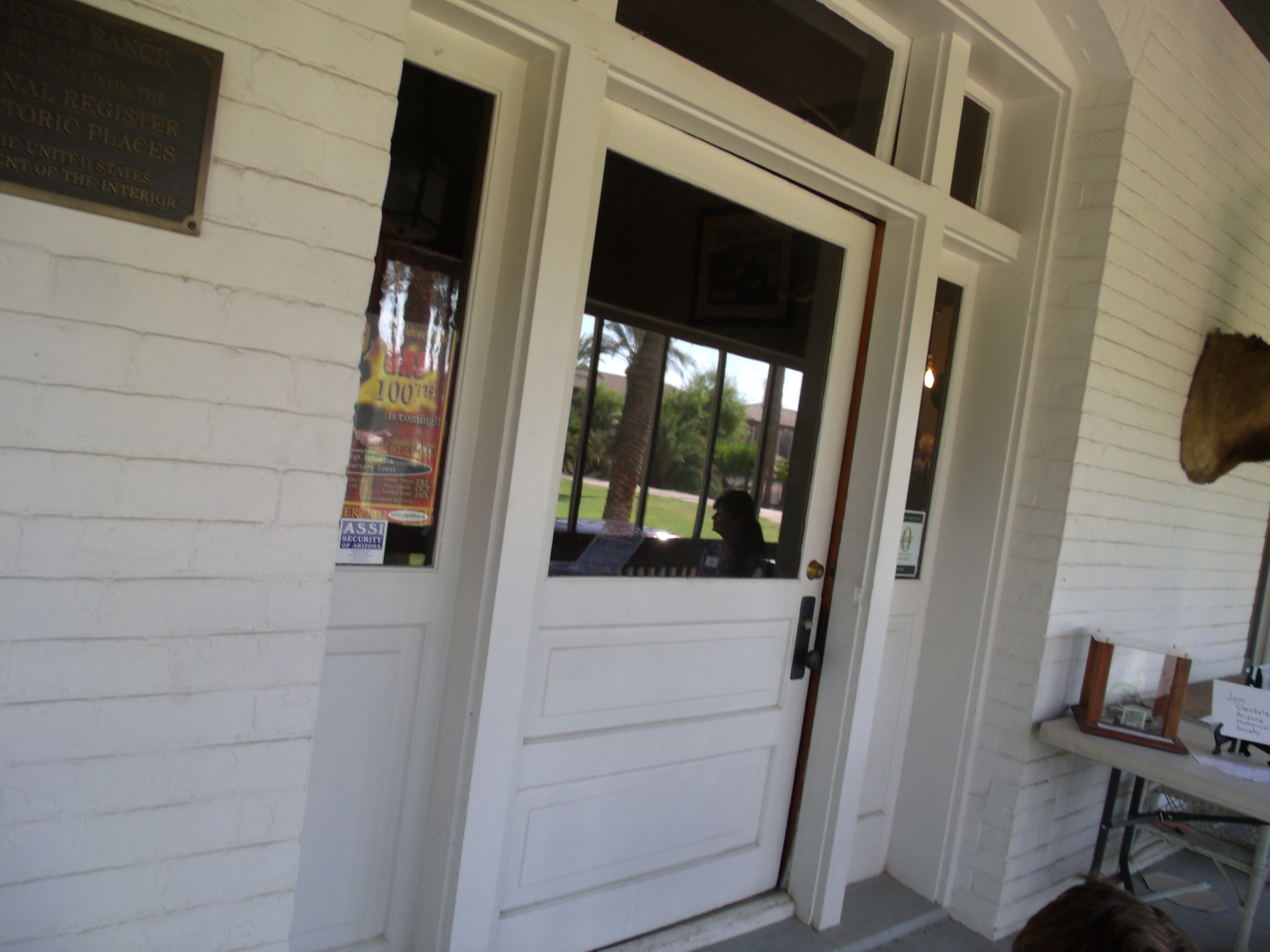
Main door and entrance of the Manistee Mansion.

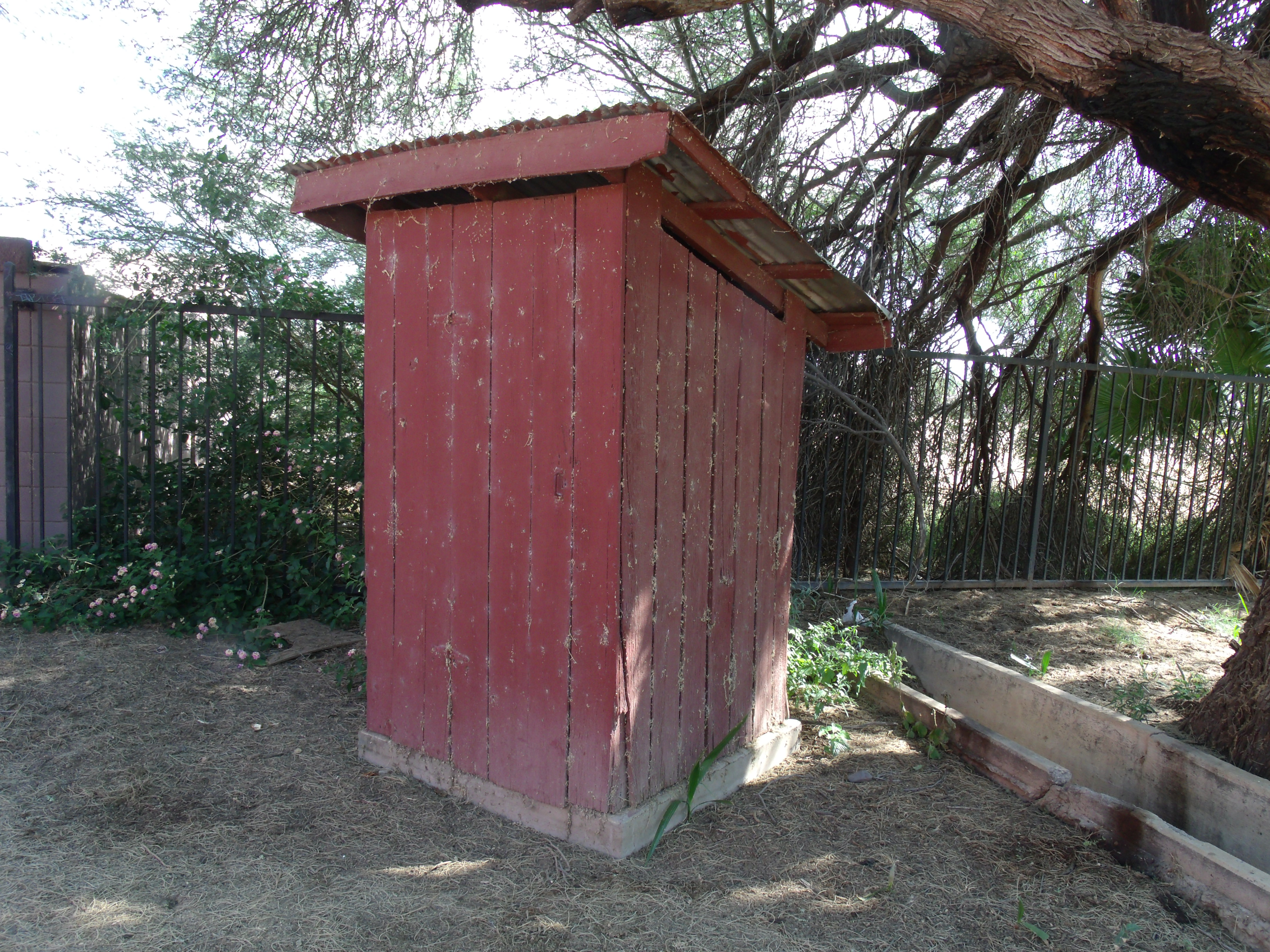
Manistee Ranch Outhouse.

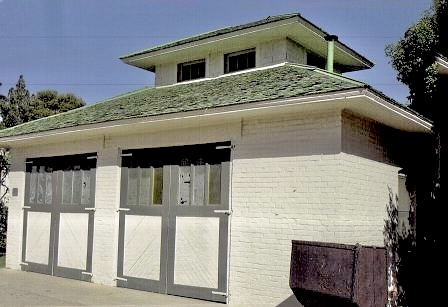
Garage in the ranch built in 1912

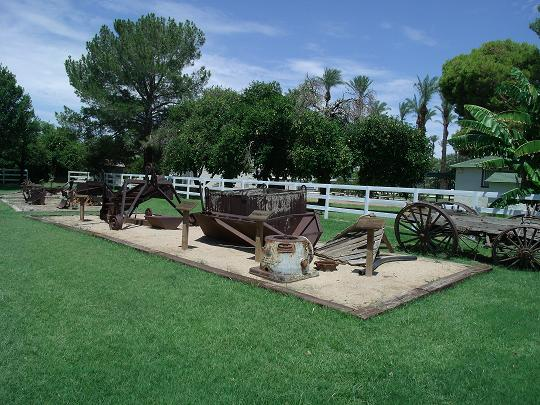
Farm equipment once used at the ranch

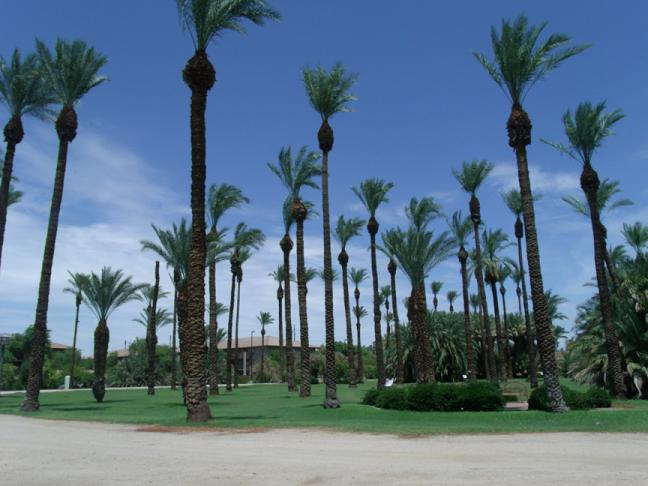
Palm trees at the ranch, some over 100 years old

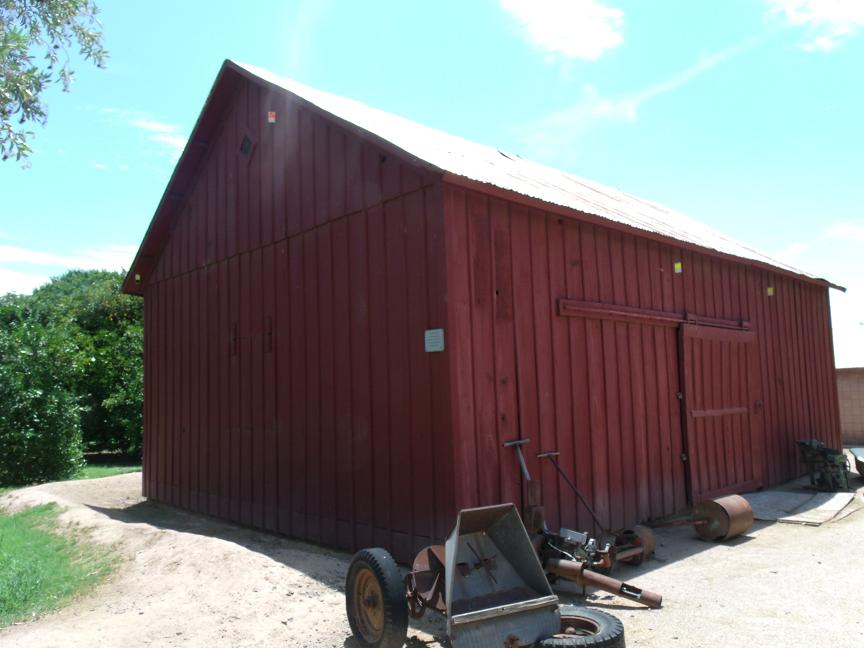
Granary Barn built in 1890

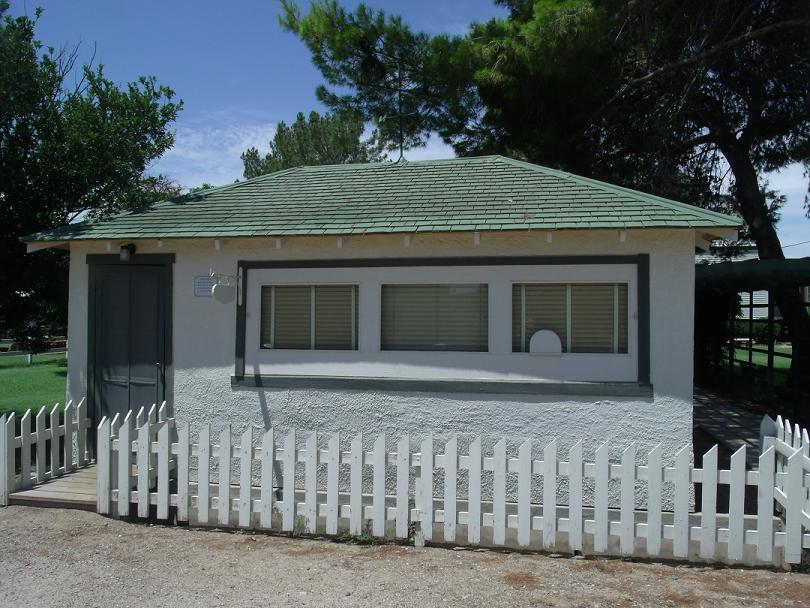
Manistee Ranch office built in 1924, and used as such by the Sands family, until 1947
Images of the 19th Century interior furnishings and decorations of the Manistee Main Mansion.
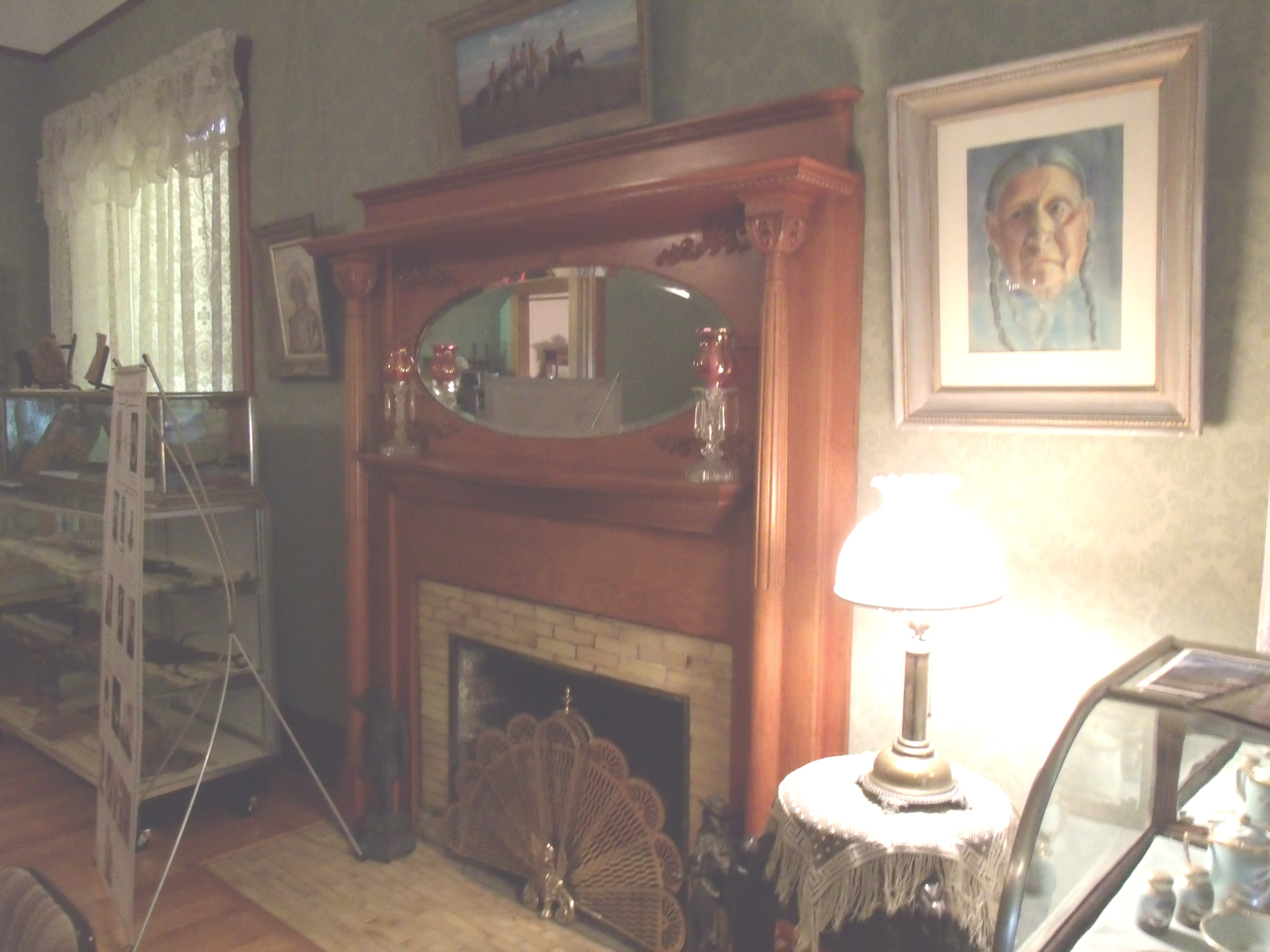
Fireplace in the living room of the Manistee Mansion .

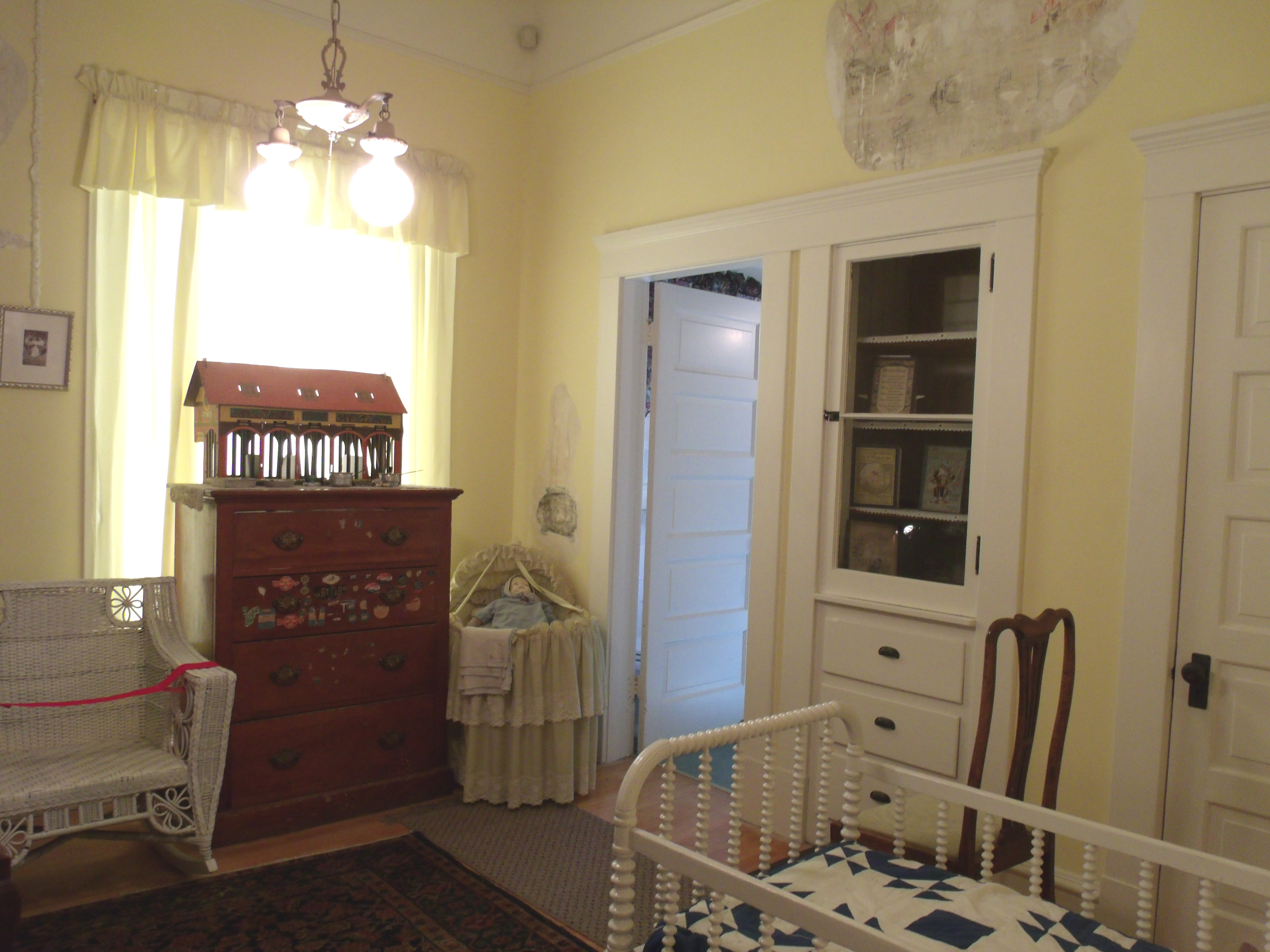
Children's room in the Manistee Mansion .

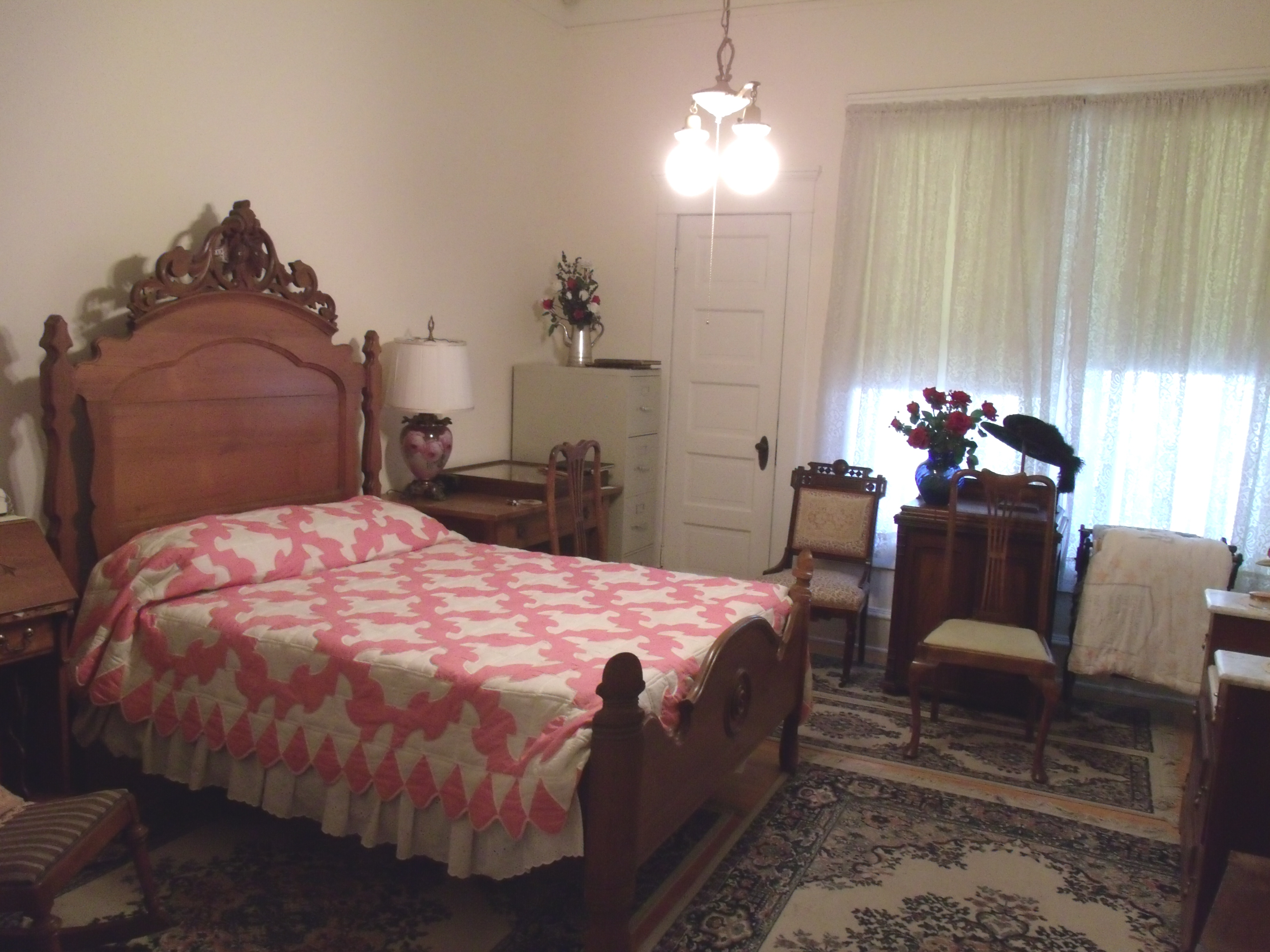
Main bedroom of the Manistee Mansion .

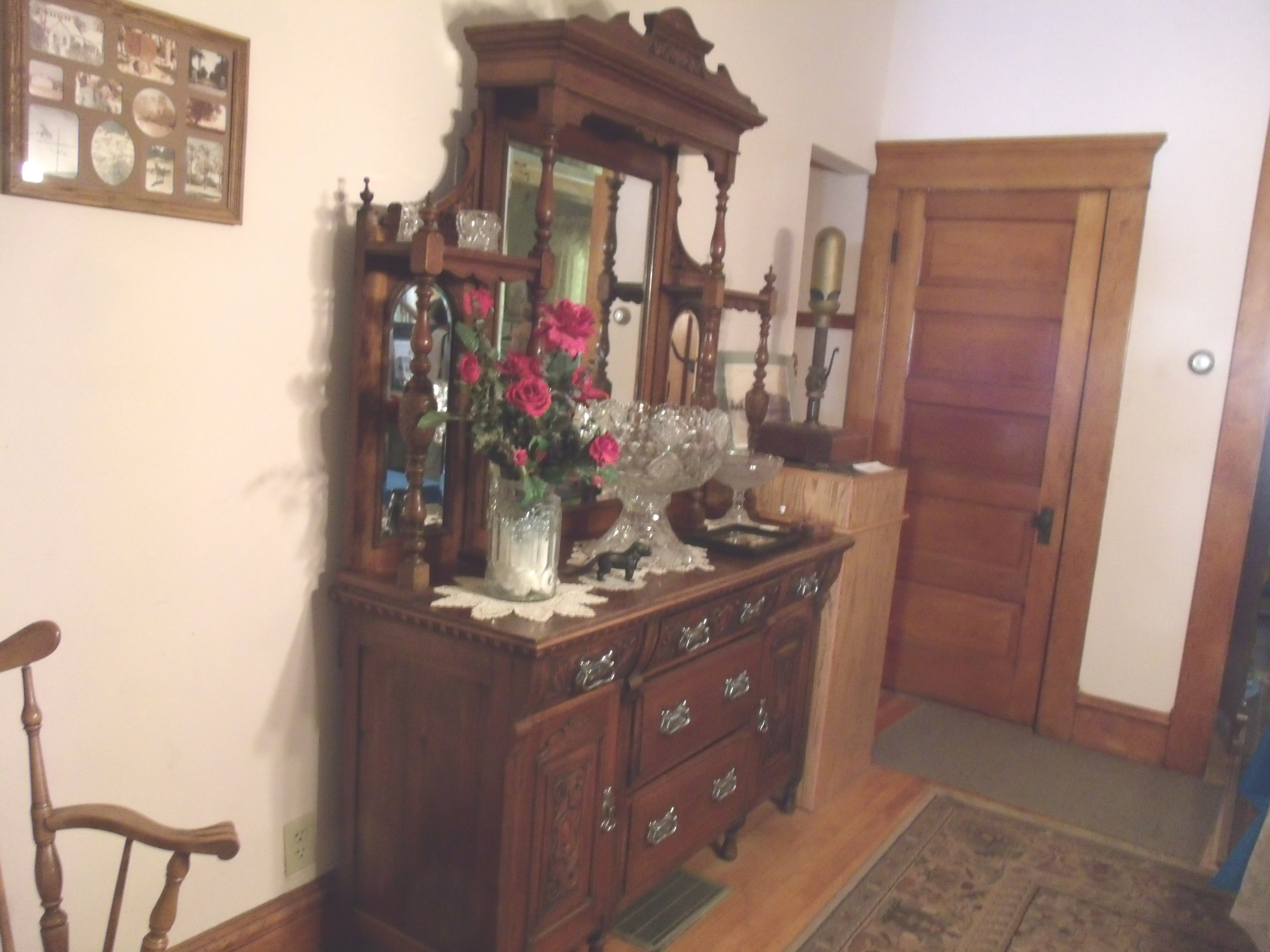
Bedroom in the first floor of the Manistee Mansion .

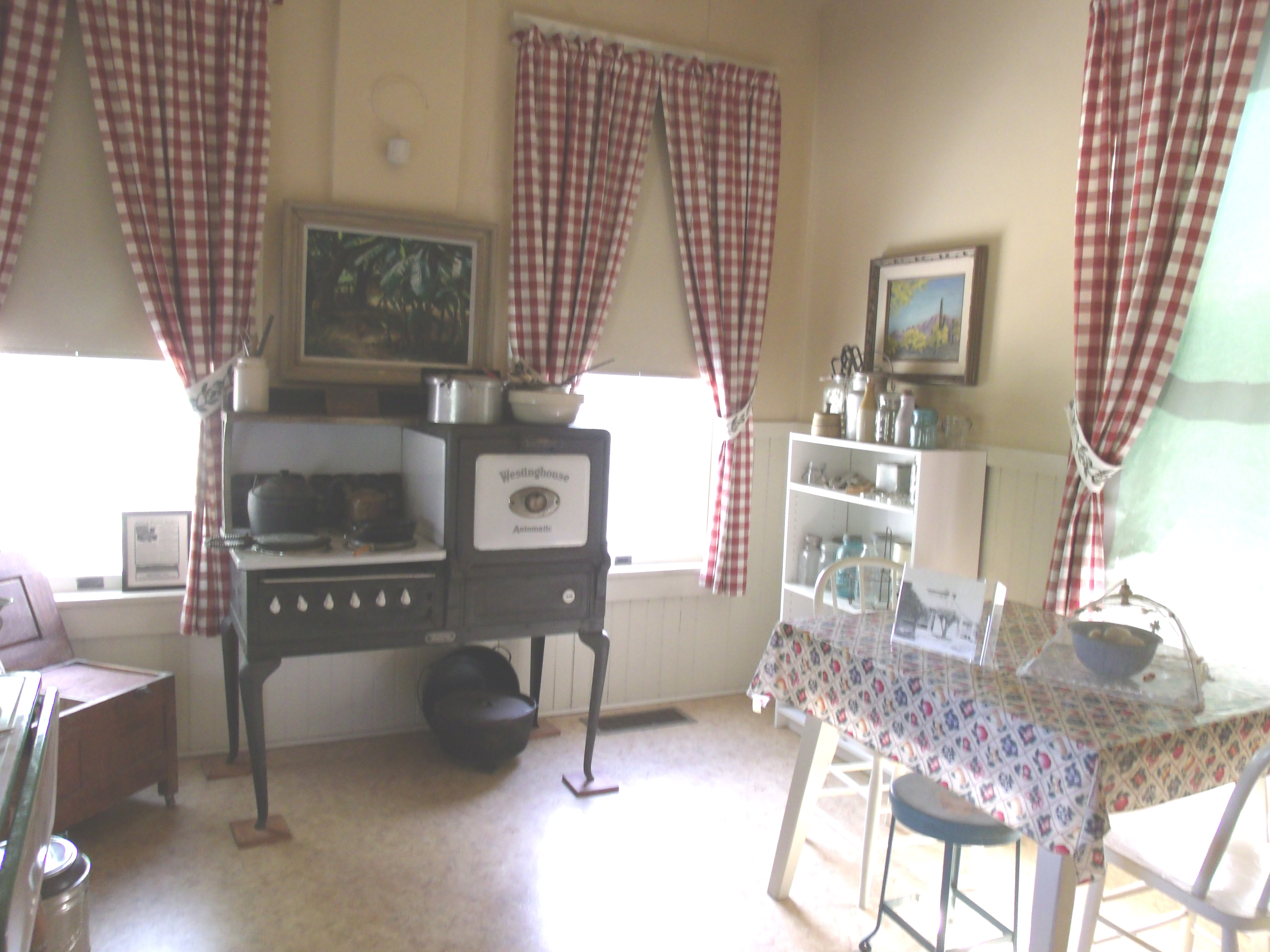
19th century kitchen of the Manistee Mansion .

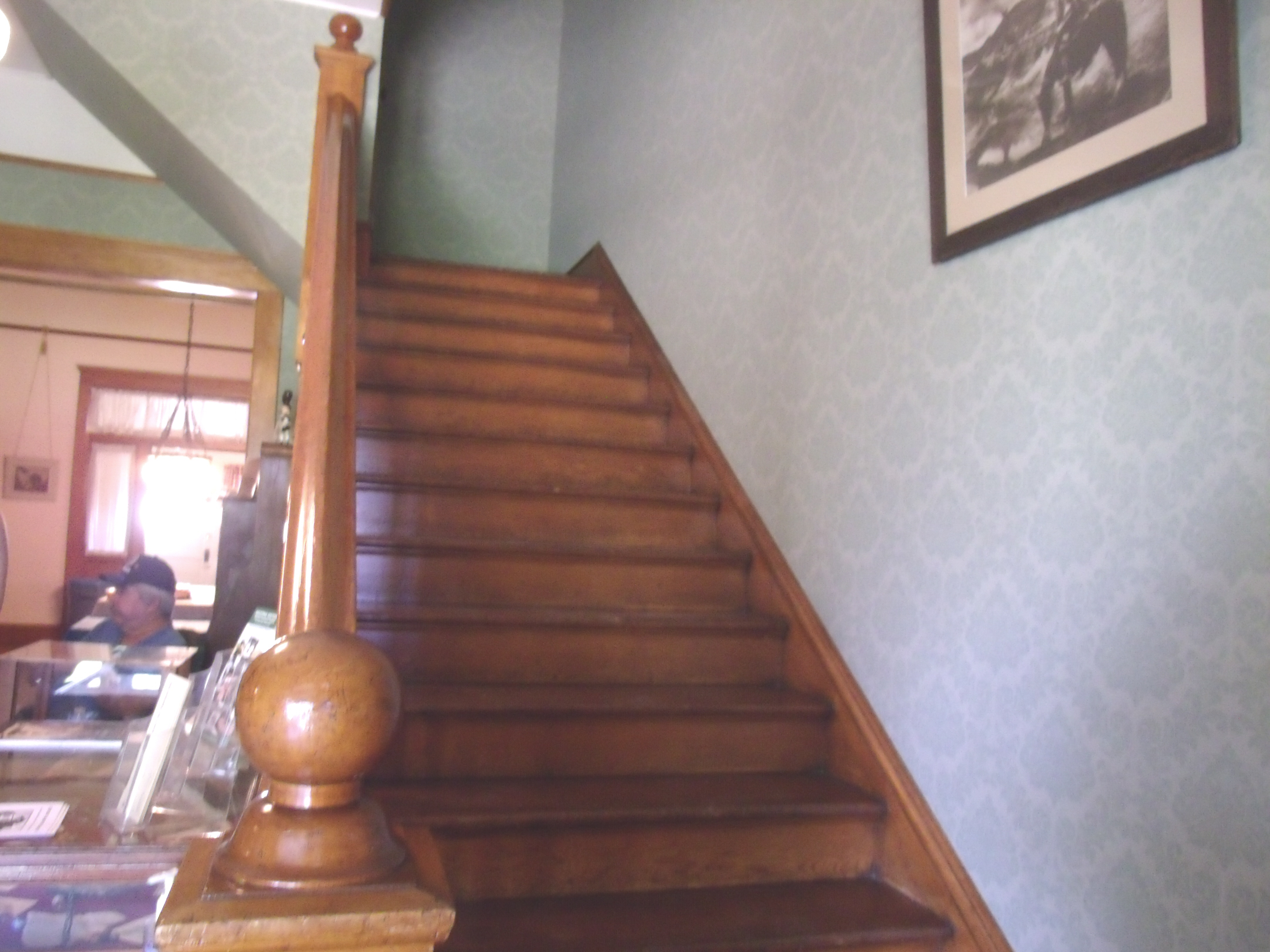
Staircase leading to the second floor of the Manistee Mansion .
Sahuaro Ranch
(NRHP = National Register of Historic Places)
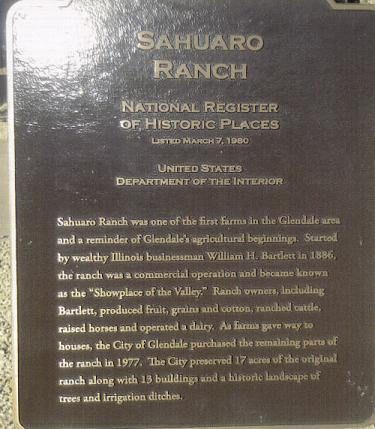
National Register of Historic Places Marker in Sahauro Ranch.

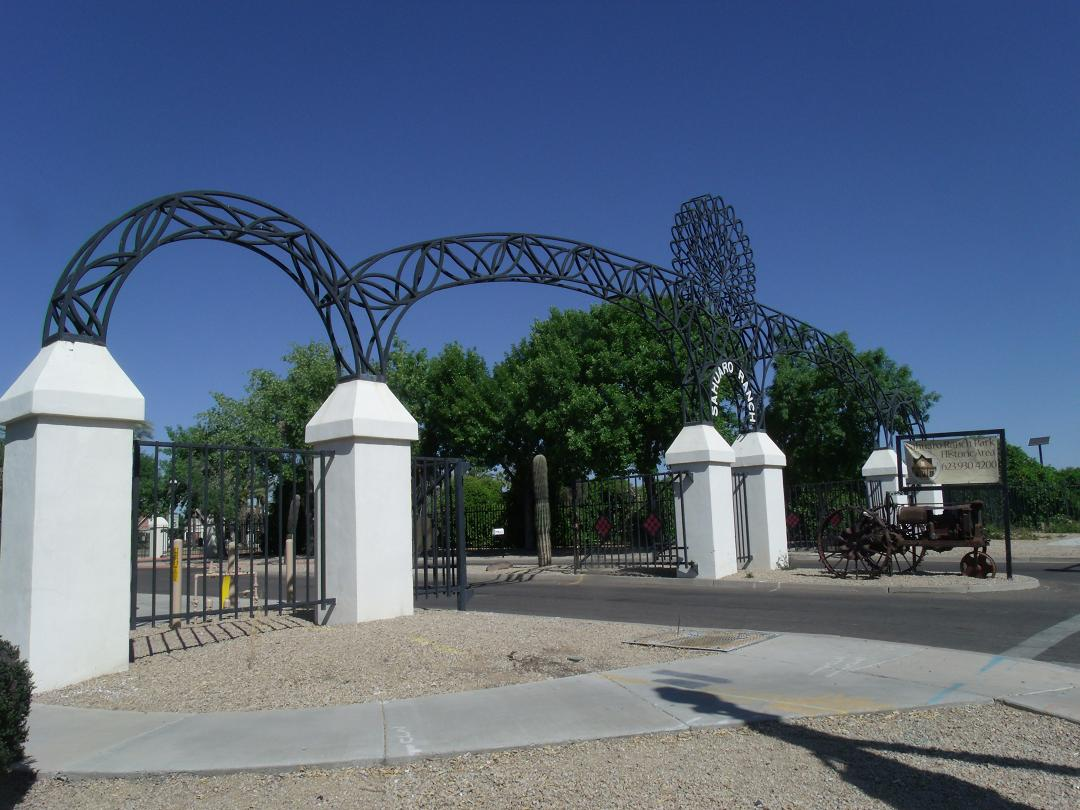
Entrance to Historic Sahuaro Ranch.

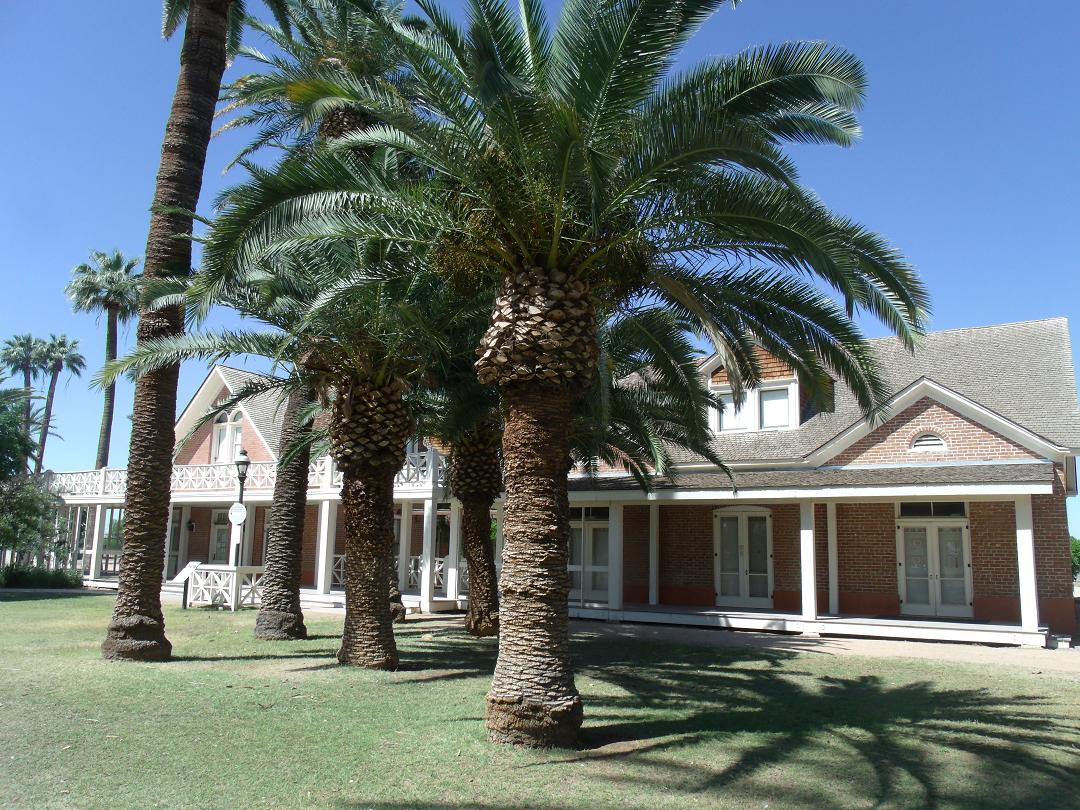
Main mansion of the Sahuaro Ranch, built in 1886 (NRHP)

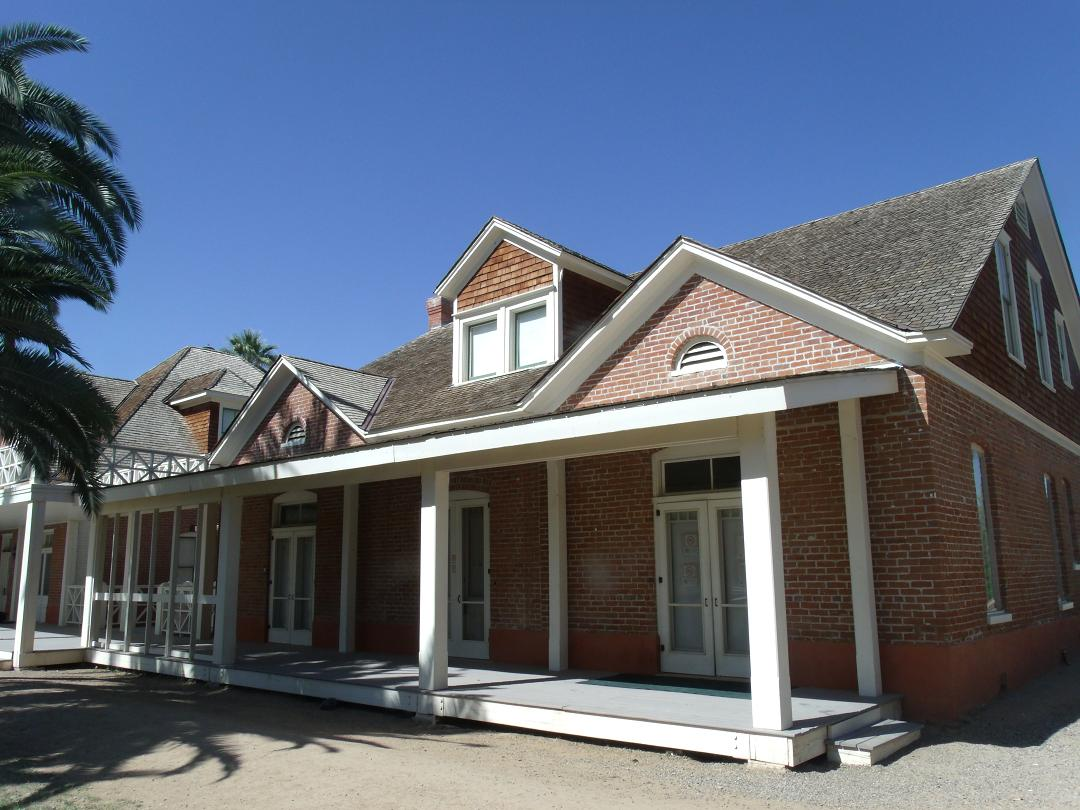
Different view of Main mansion of the Sahuaro Ranch, built in 1886 (NRHP)

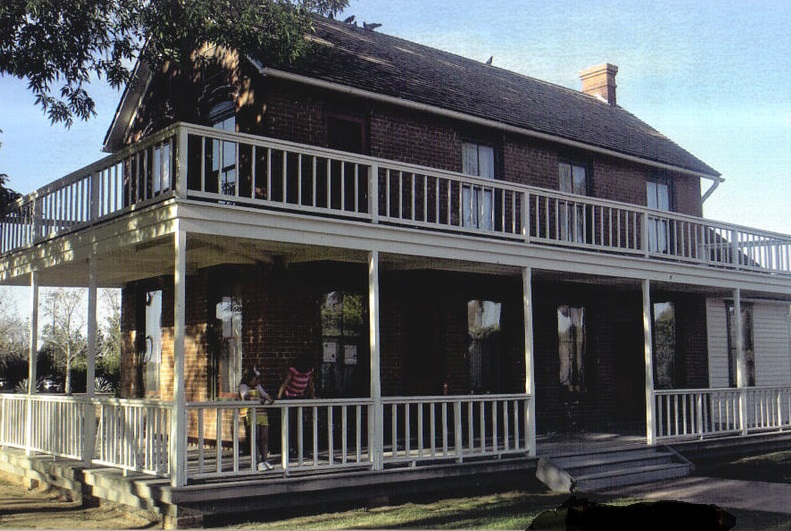
Sahuaro Ranch Foreman's House, built in 1890 (NRHP)

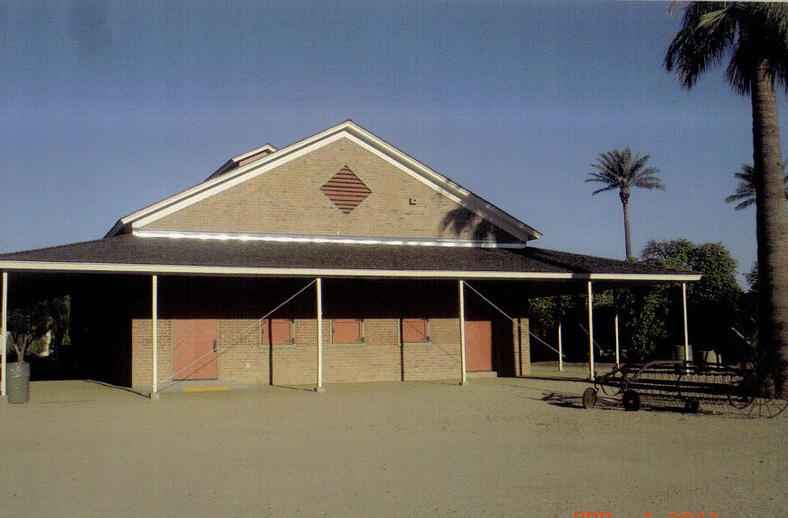
Feed and Storage House in Sahuaro Ranch, built in 1890 (NRHP)

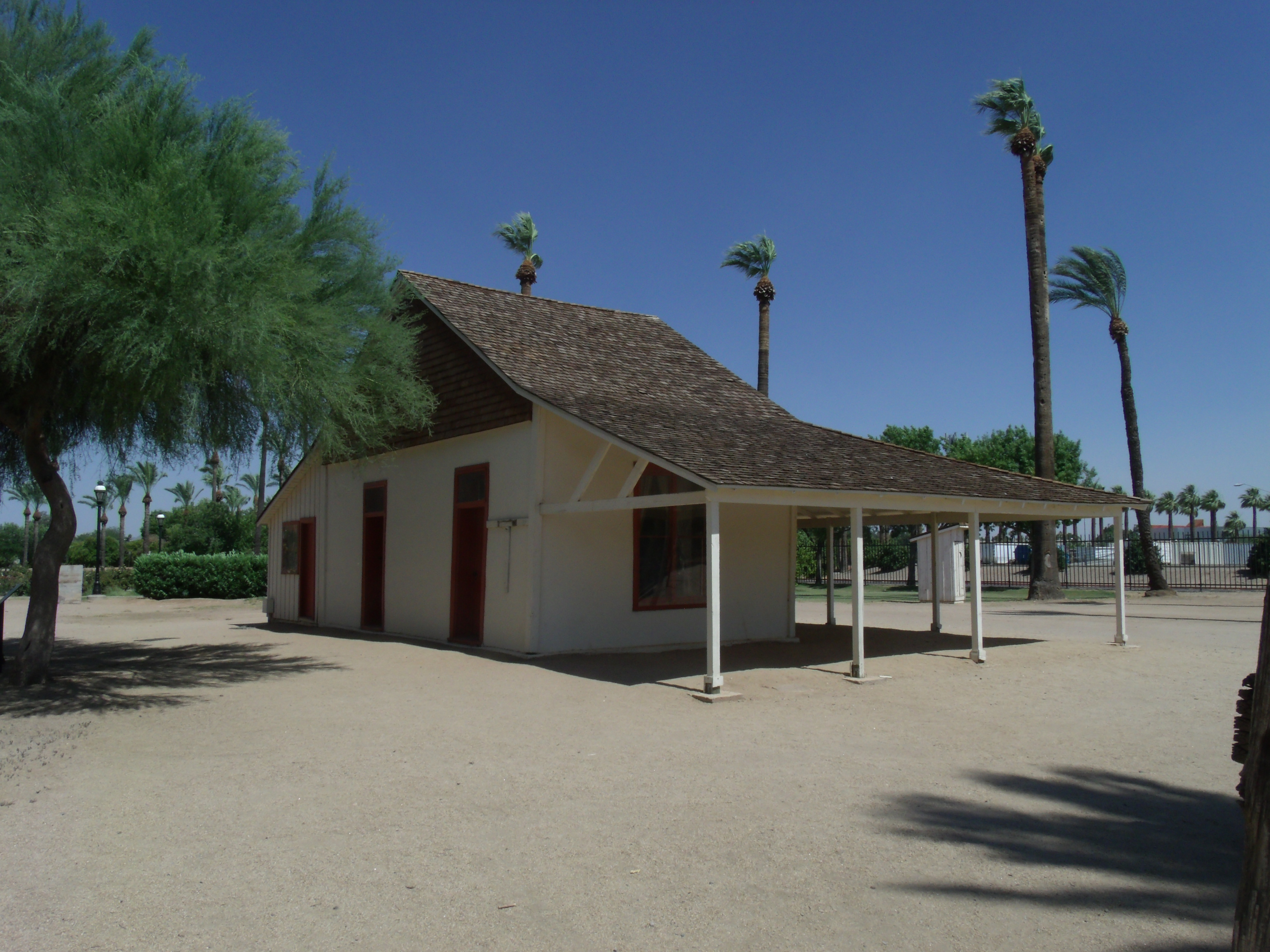
Adobe house – the first house built in Sahuaro Ranch

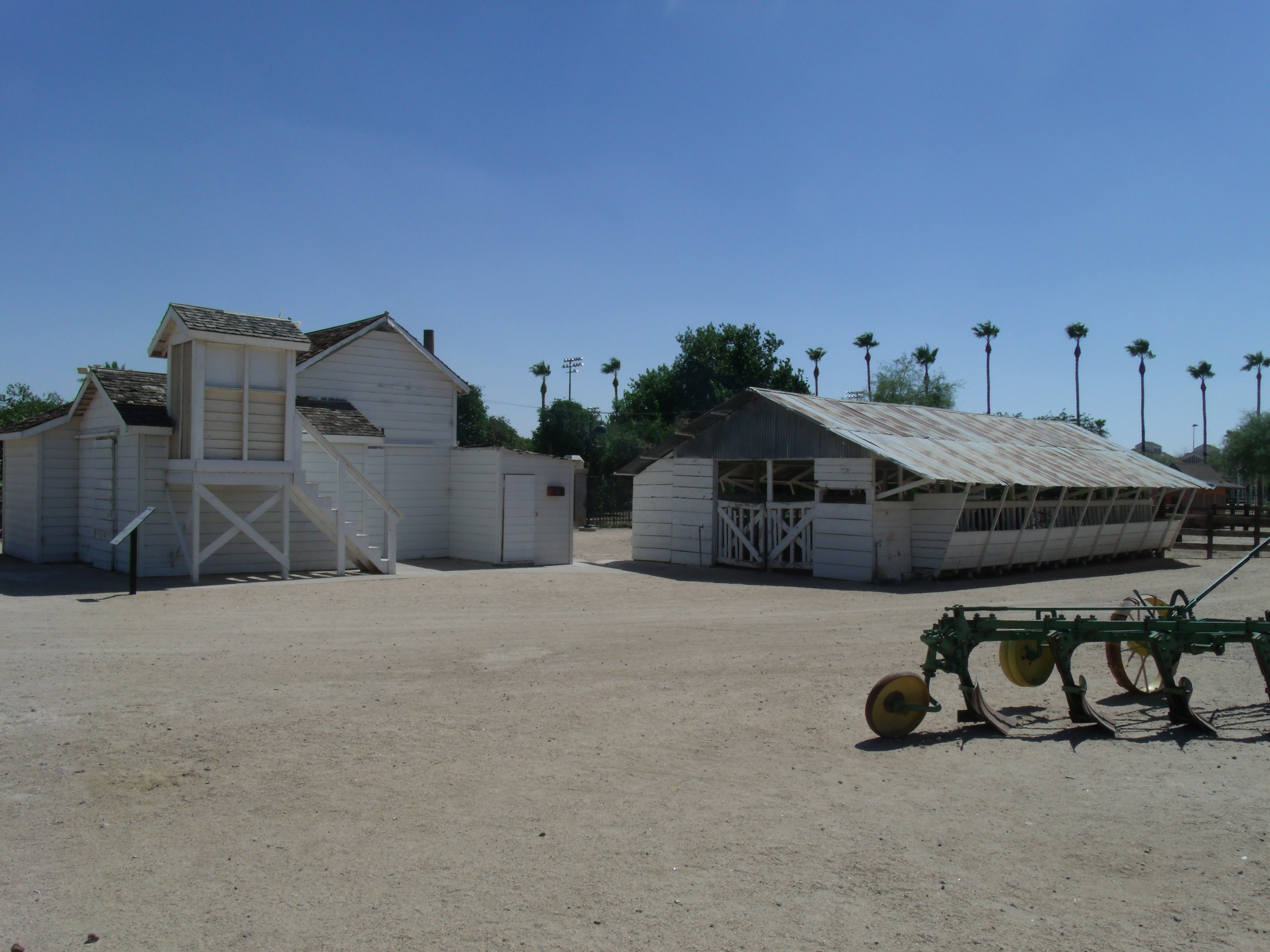
Saguaro Ranch Dairy Barn

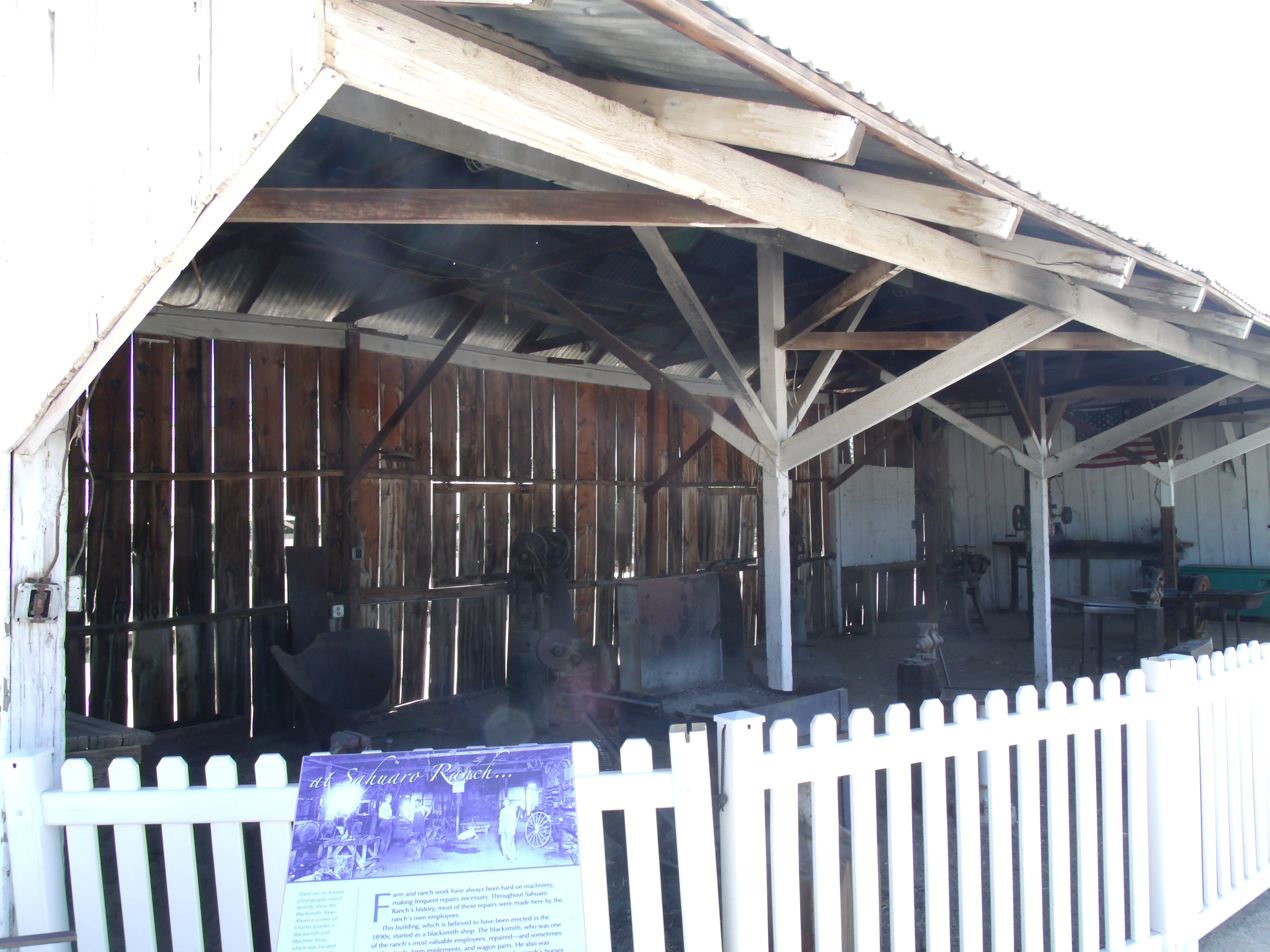
Saguaro Ranch Blacksmith Shop (1890).

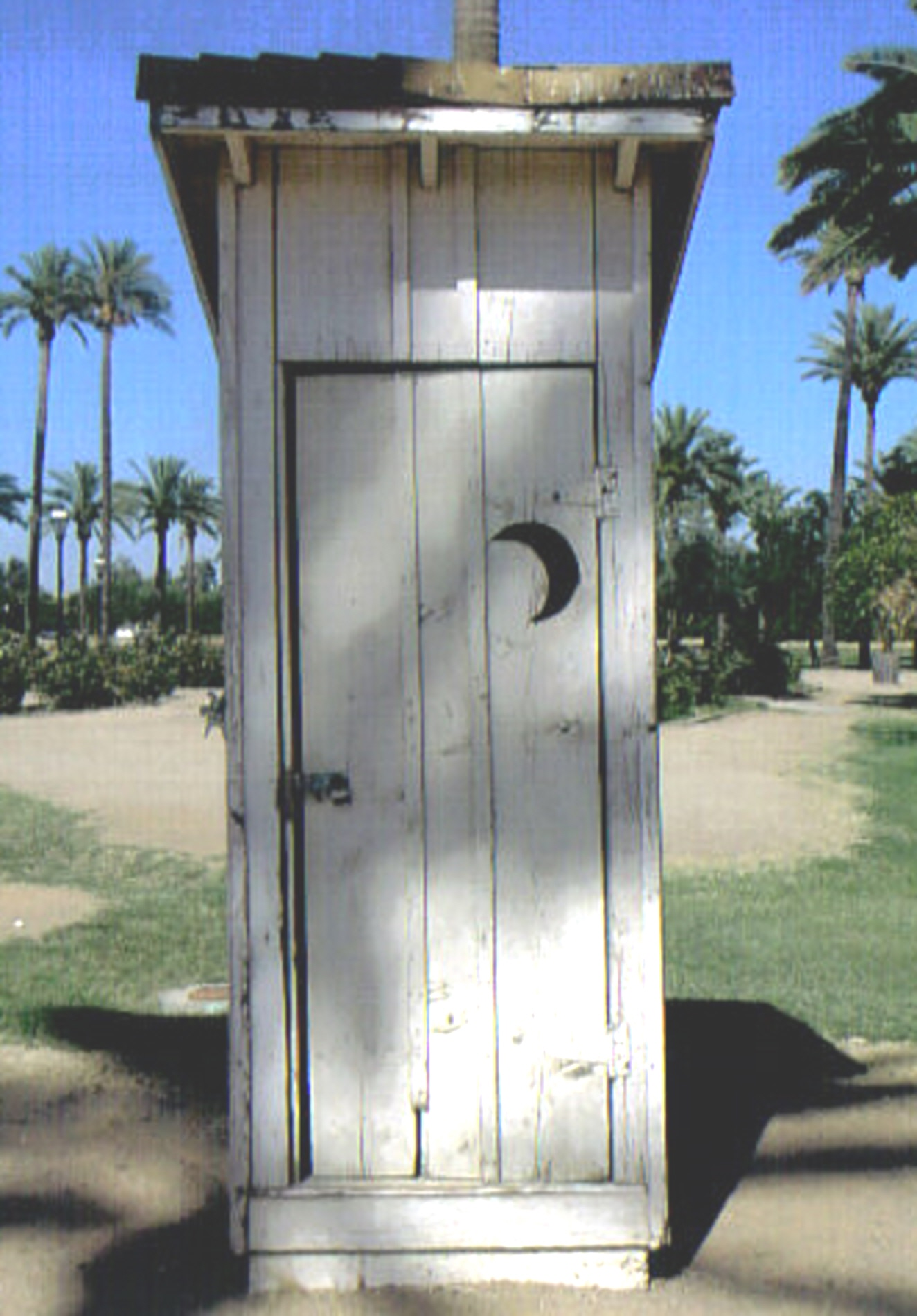
Saguaro Ranch Outhouse (1890).

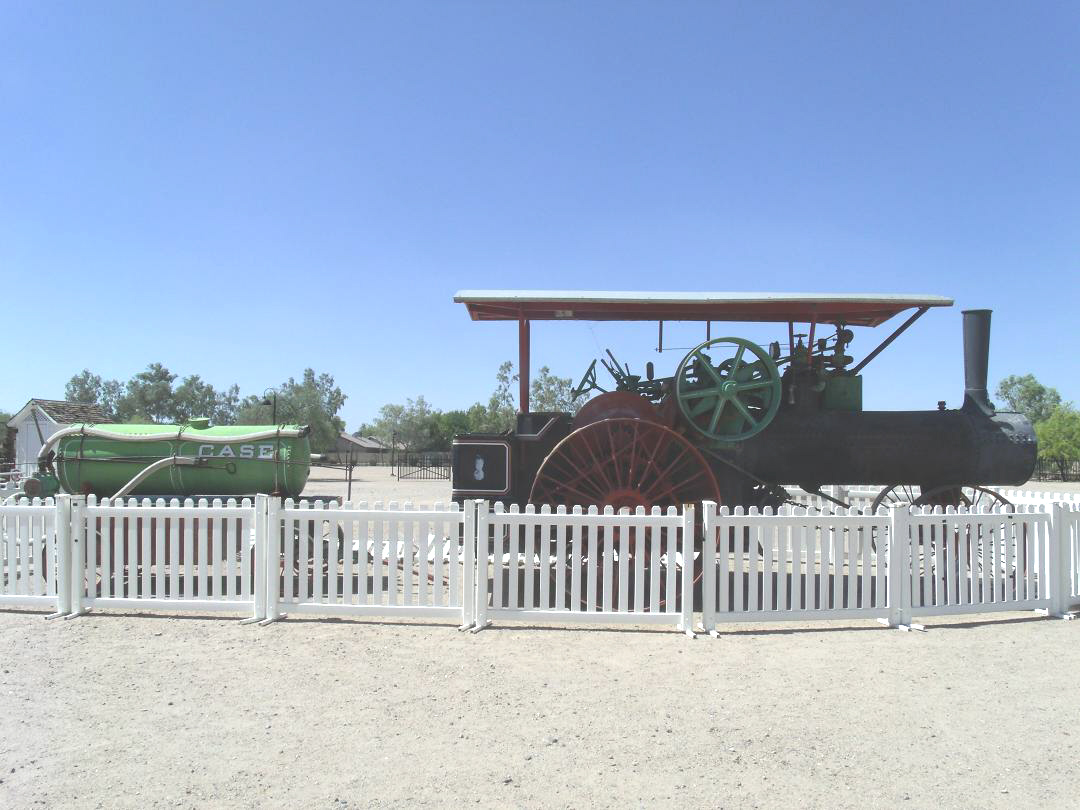
Case Steam Engine used in Sahuaro Ranch.

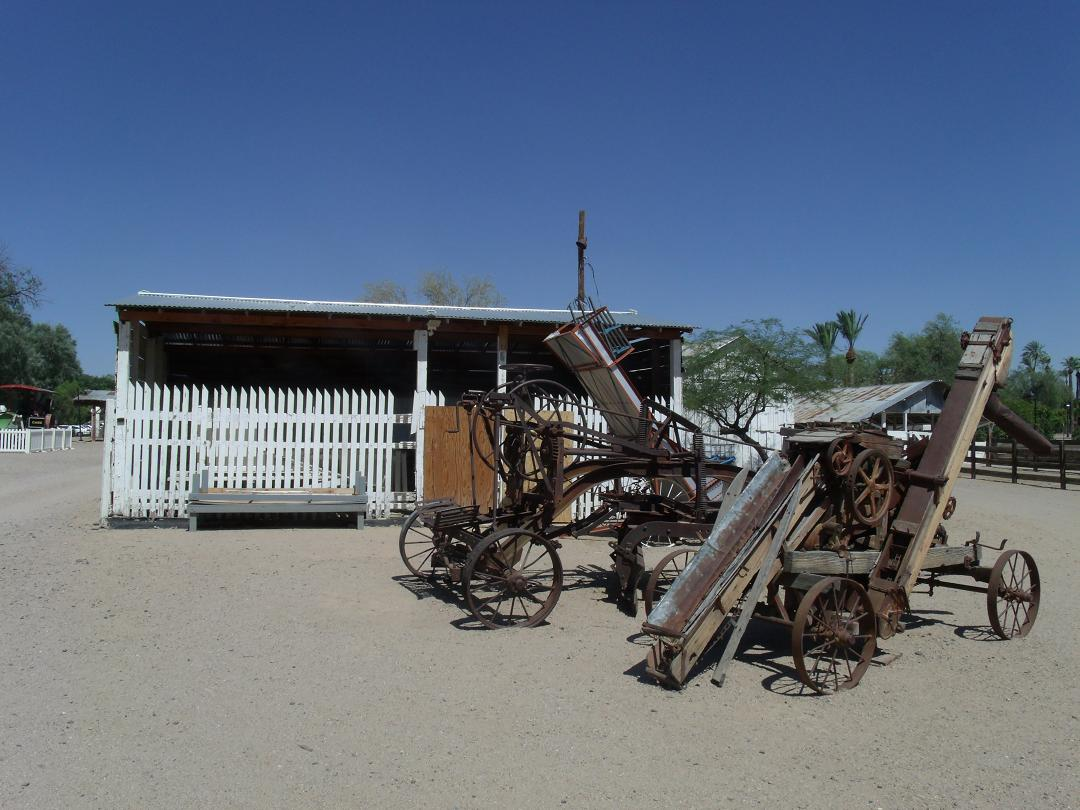
Saguaro Ranch Farm machinery and 1890s Horse Stable (in background).

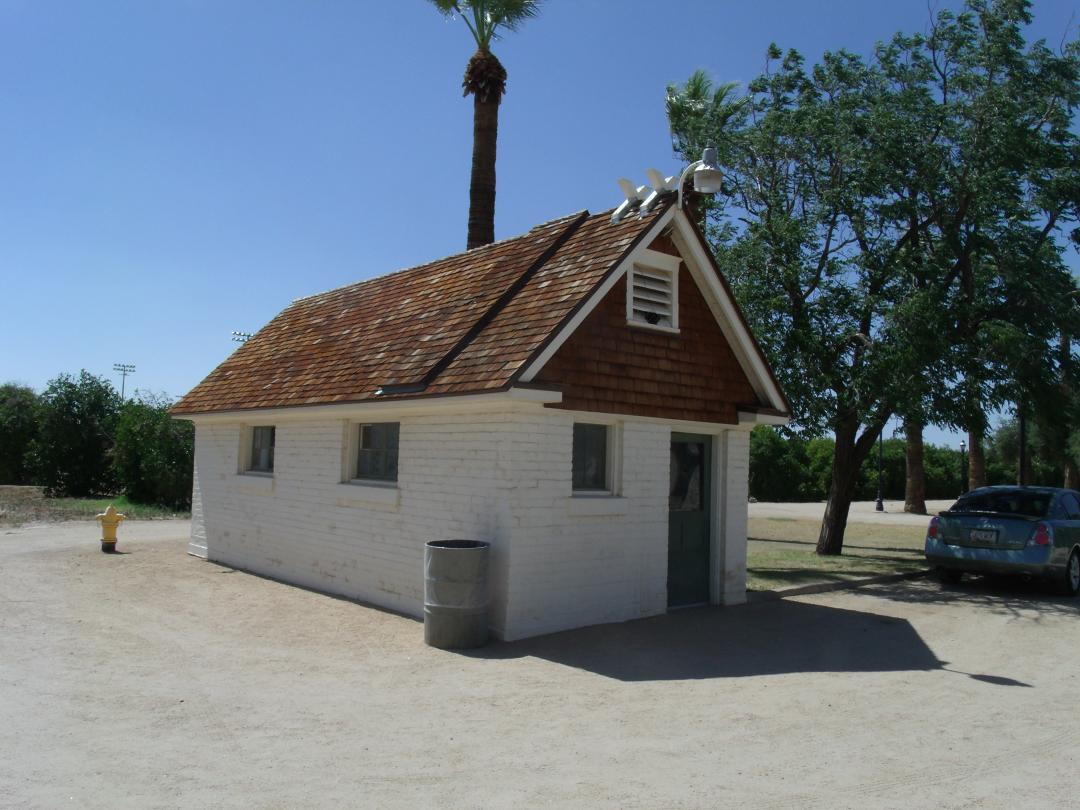
1901 Saguaro Ranch Pump House.

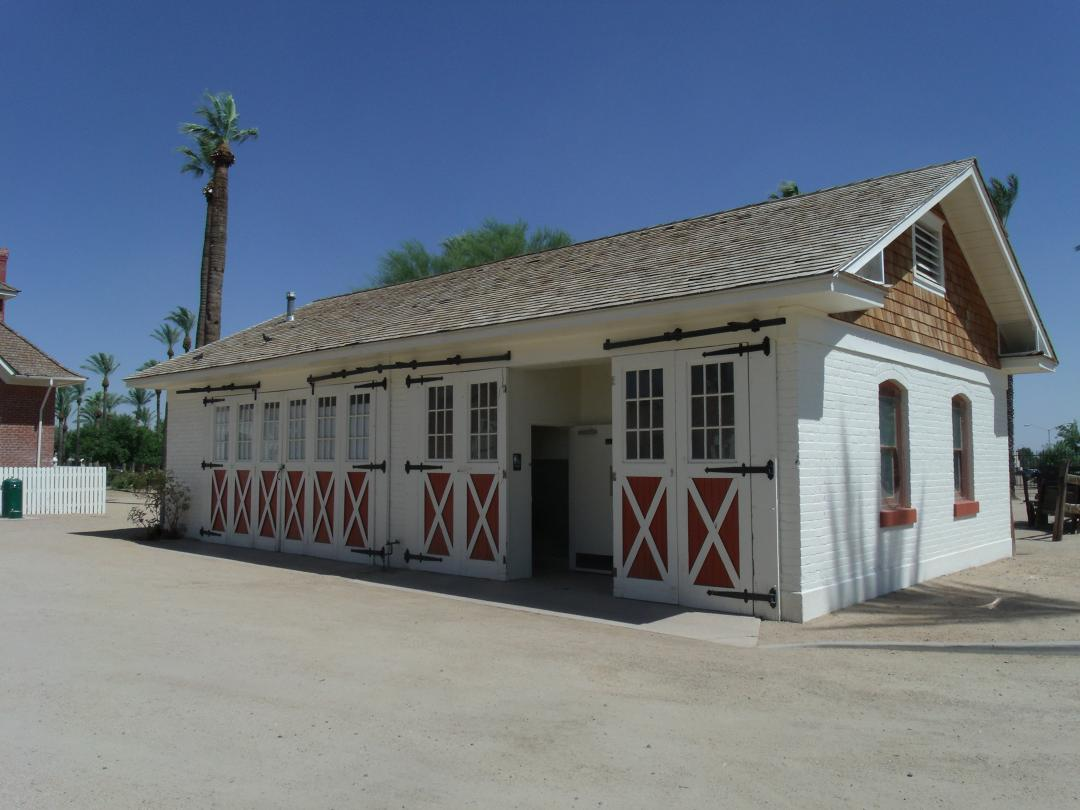
1905 Saguaro Ranch Wagon and auto garage.

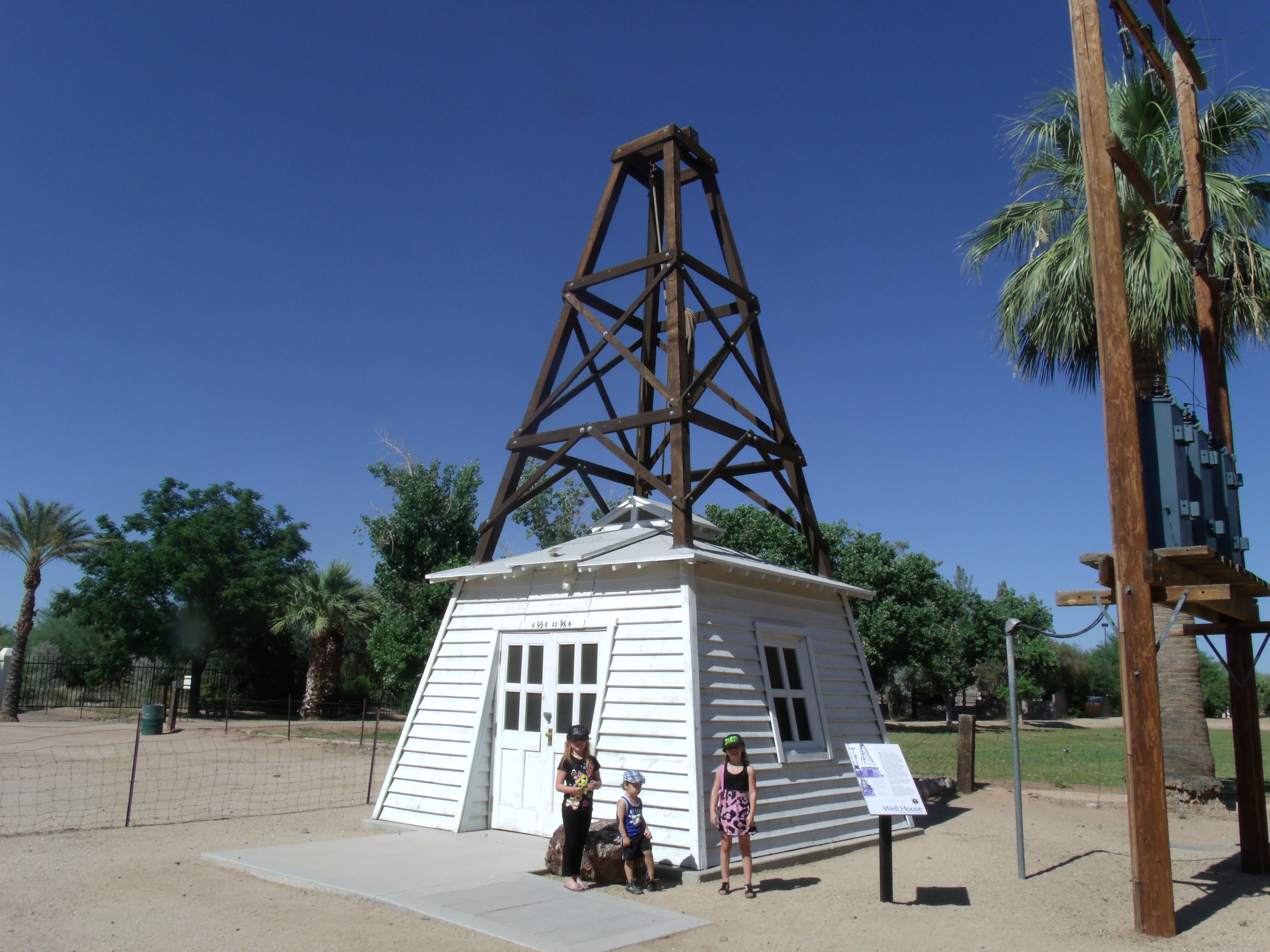
Saguaro Ranch Well House (1920).
Images of the 19th-century interior furnishings and decorations of the Main Mansion and Adobe house in Sahuaro Ranch Park
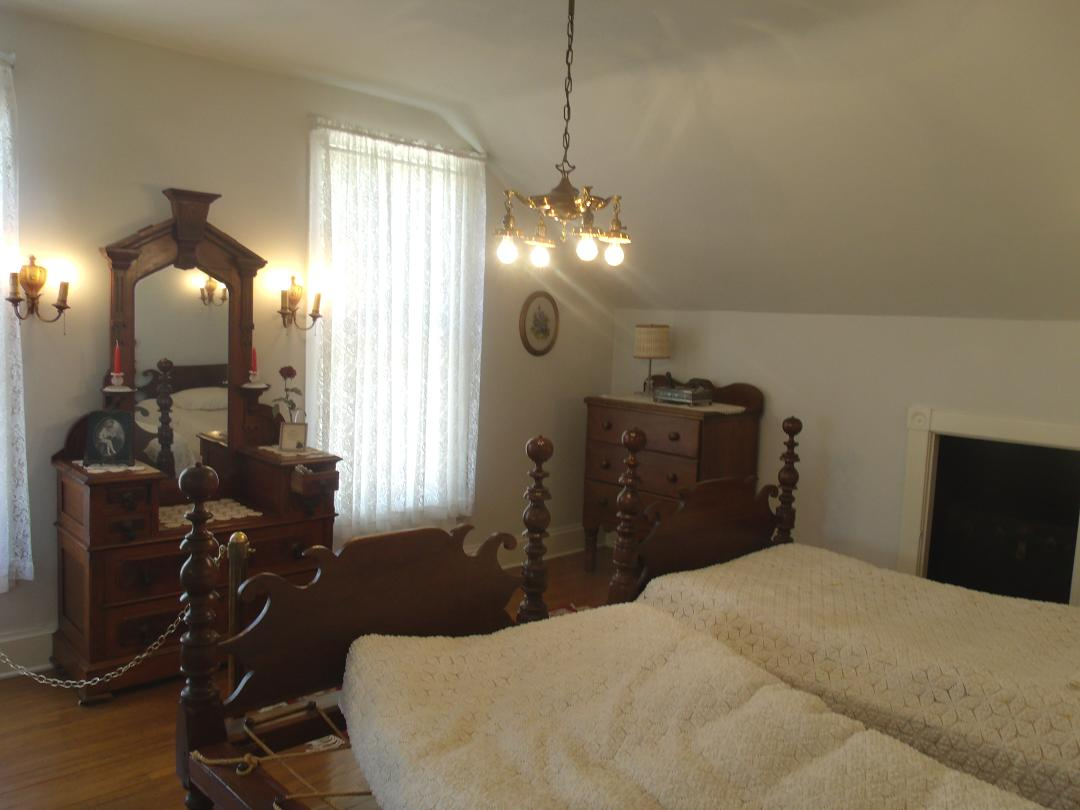
The Smith bedroom on the second floor of the main mansion

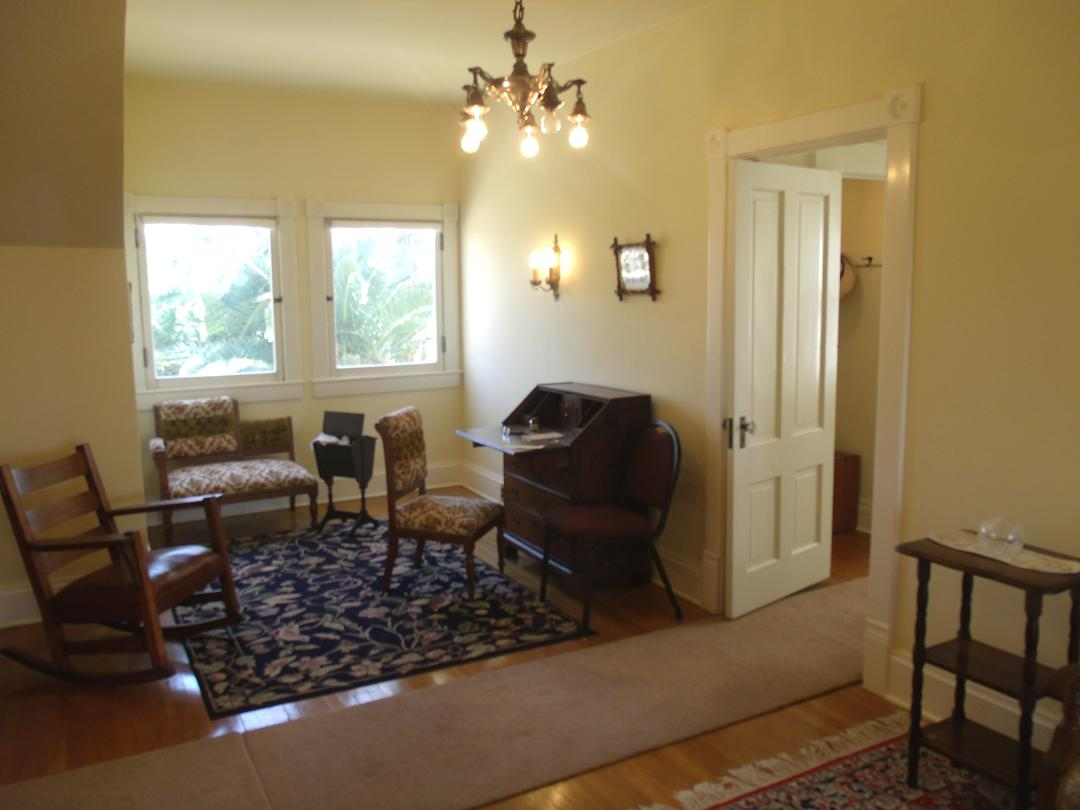
Small study in the hallway of the second floor of the main mansion

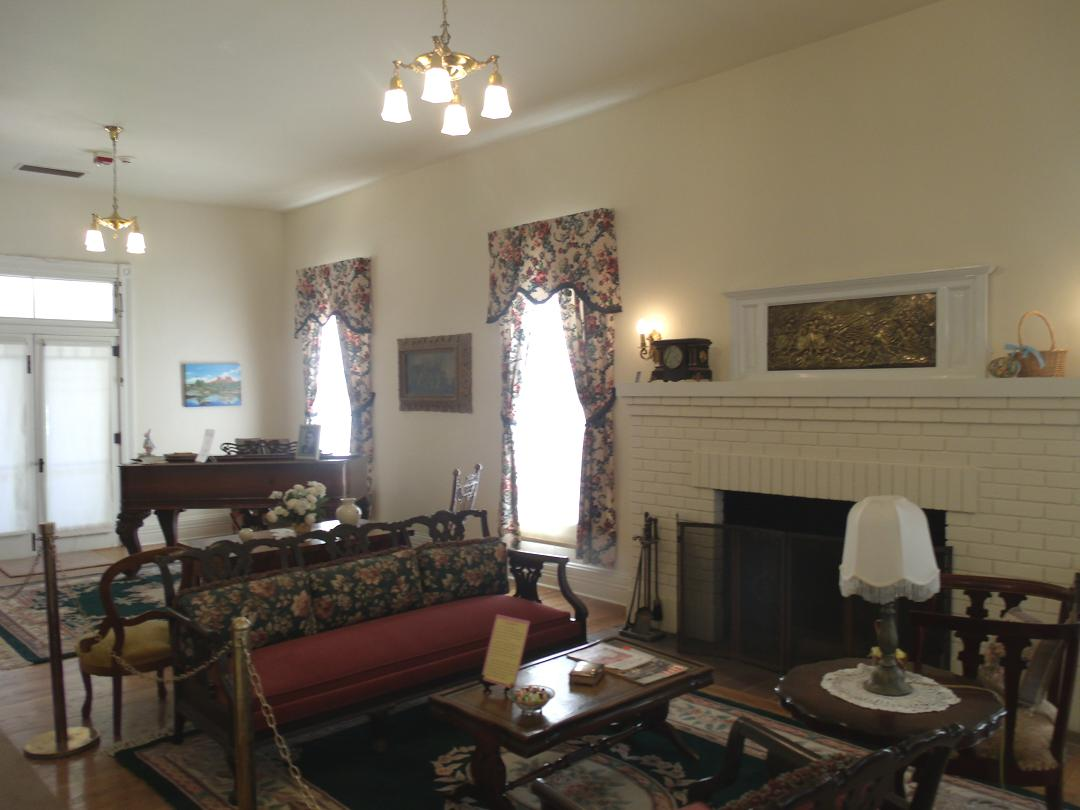
Living room in the first floor of the main mansion

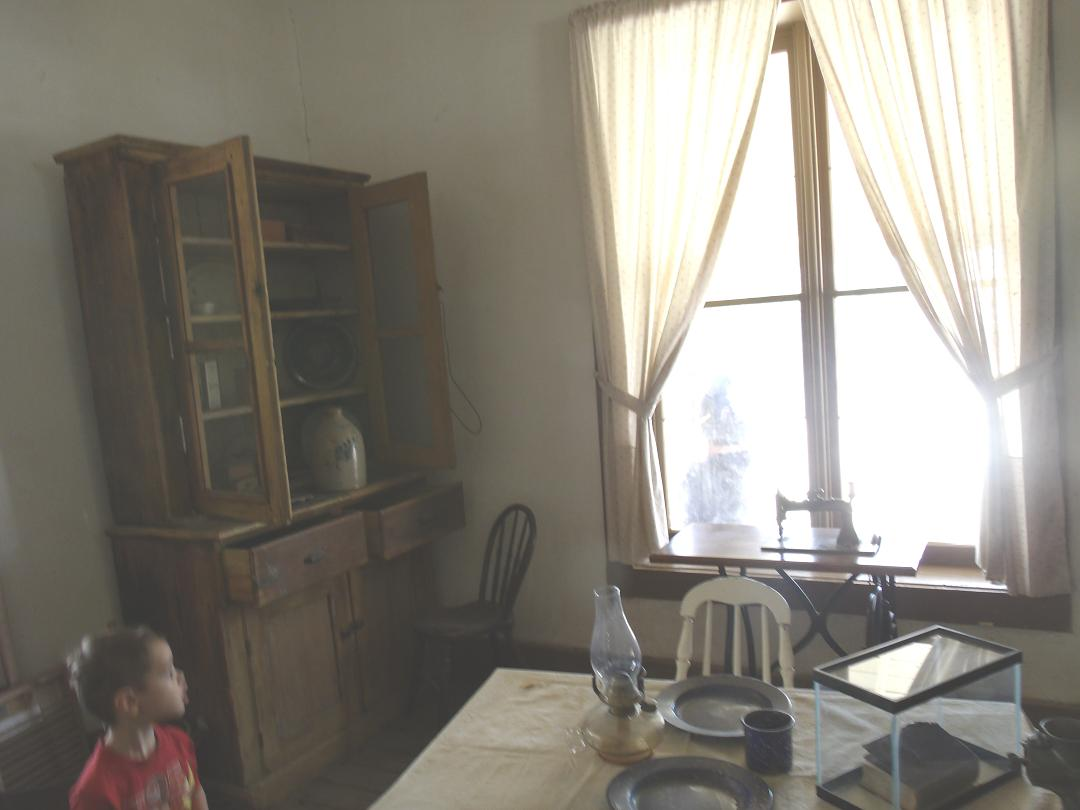
The inside of the old Adobe house, the first structure built in the Sahuaro Ranch

This was an abandoned 19th century farmhouse and barn located in the middle of 61 Ave. between Northern and Olive Avenues. The property was demolished in 2017.

Abandoned late 19th-century farm.
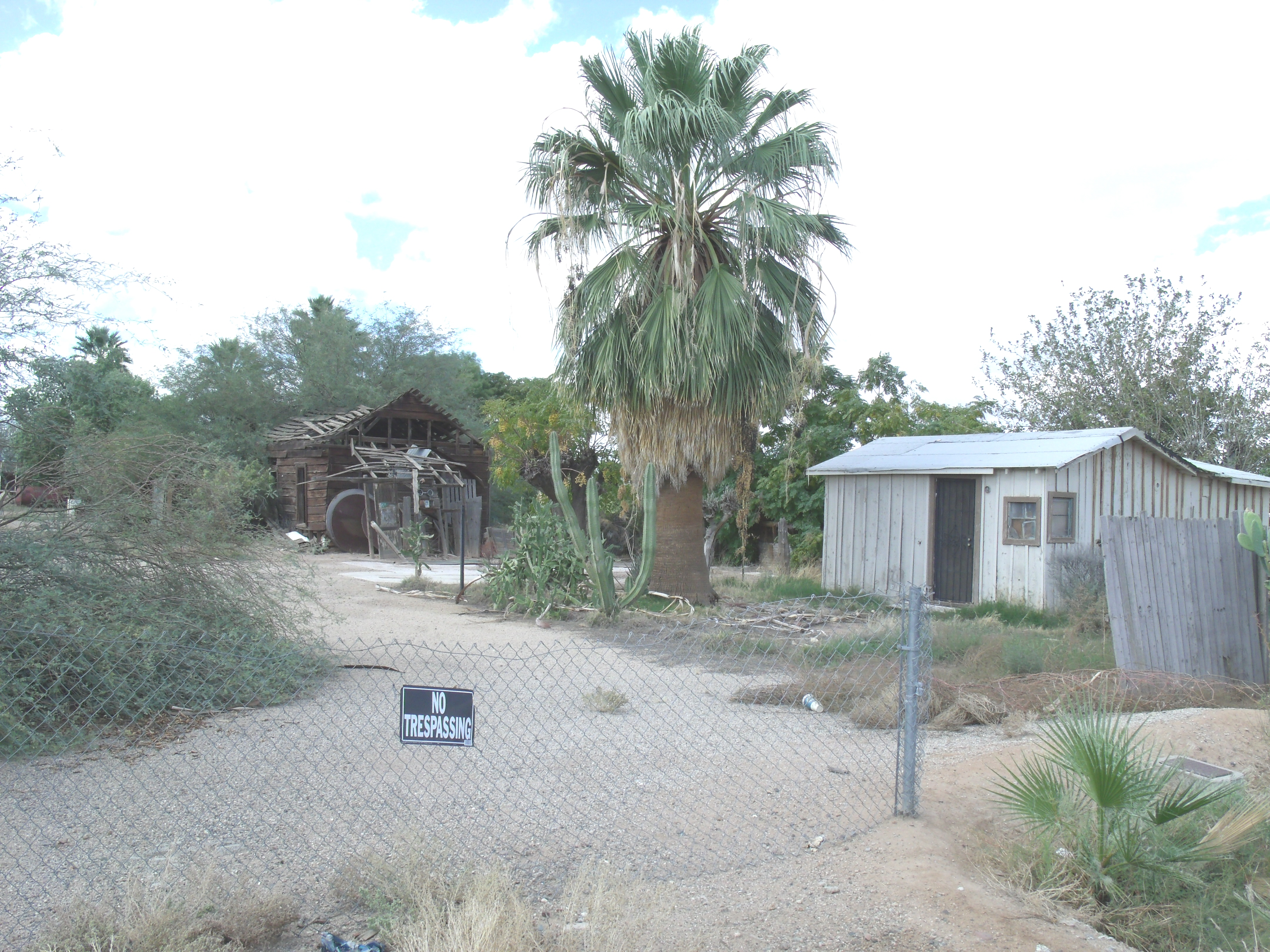
Abandoned late 19th-century farm

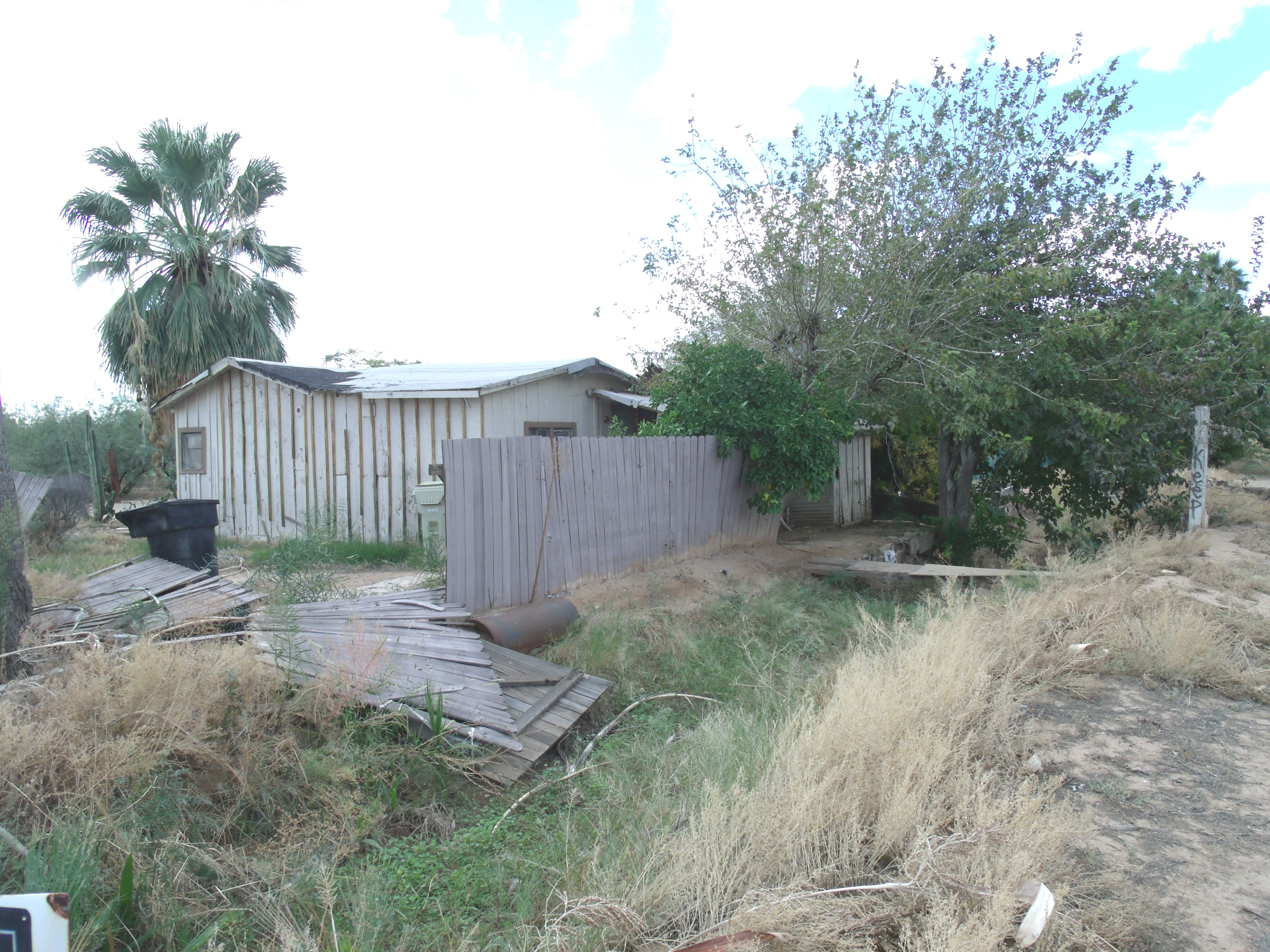
Another view of the abandoned late 19th-century farm

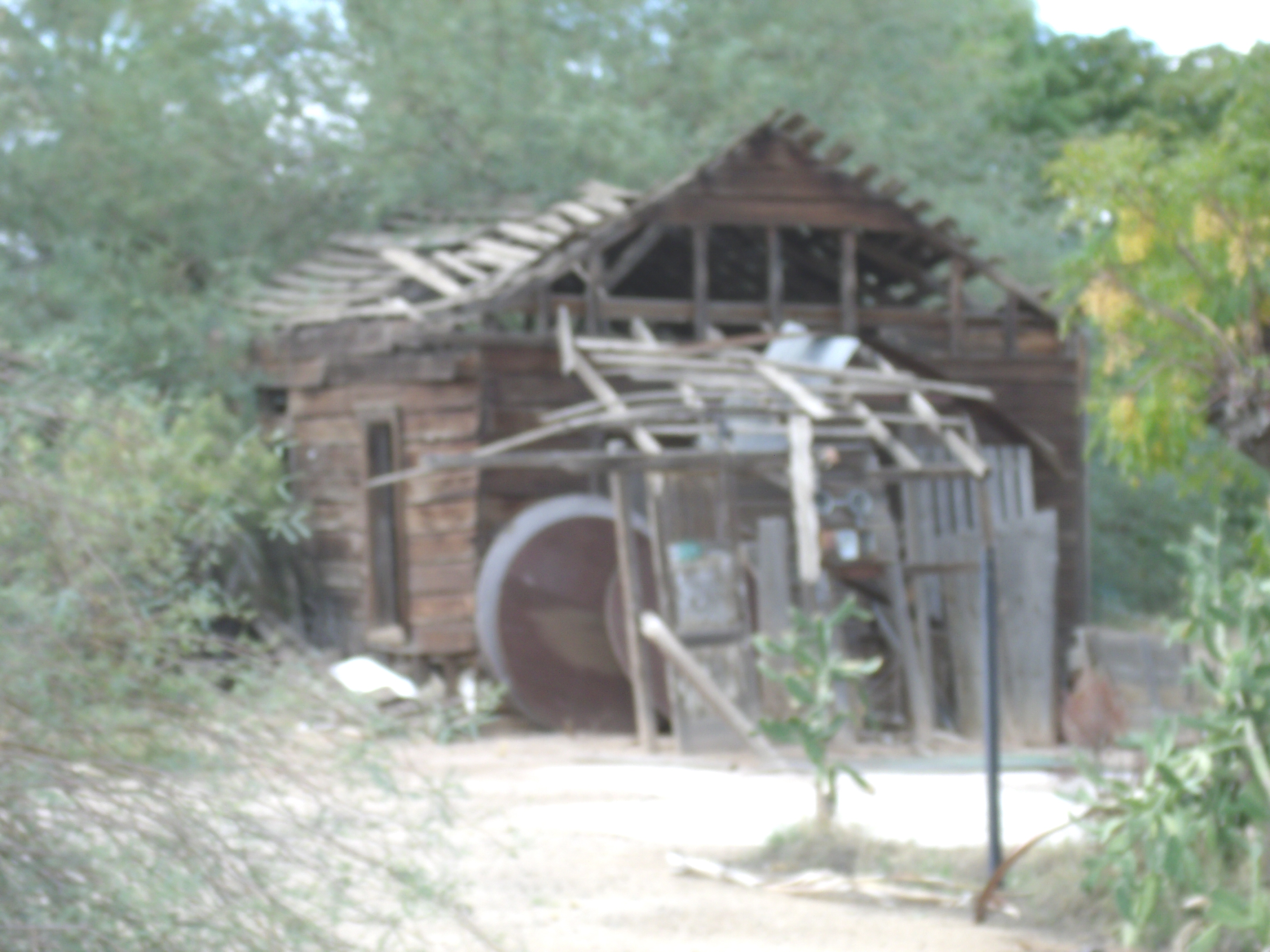
The abandoned barn of the 19th-century farm

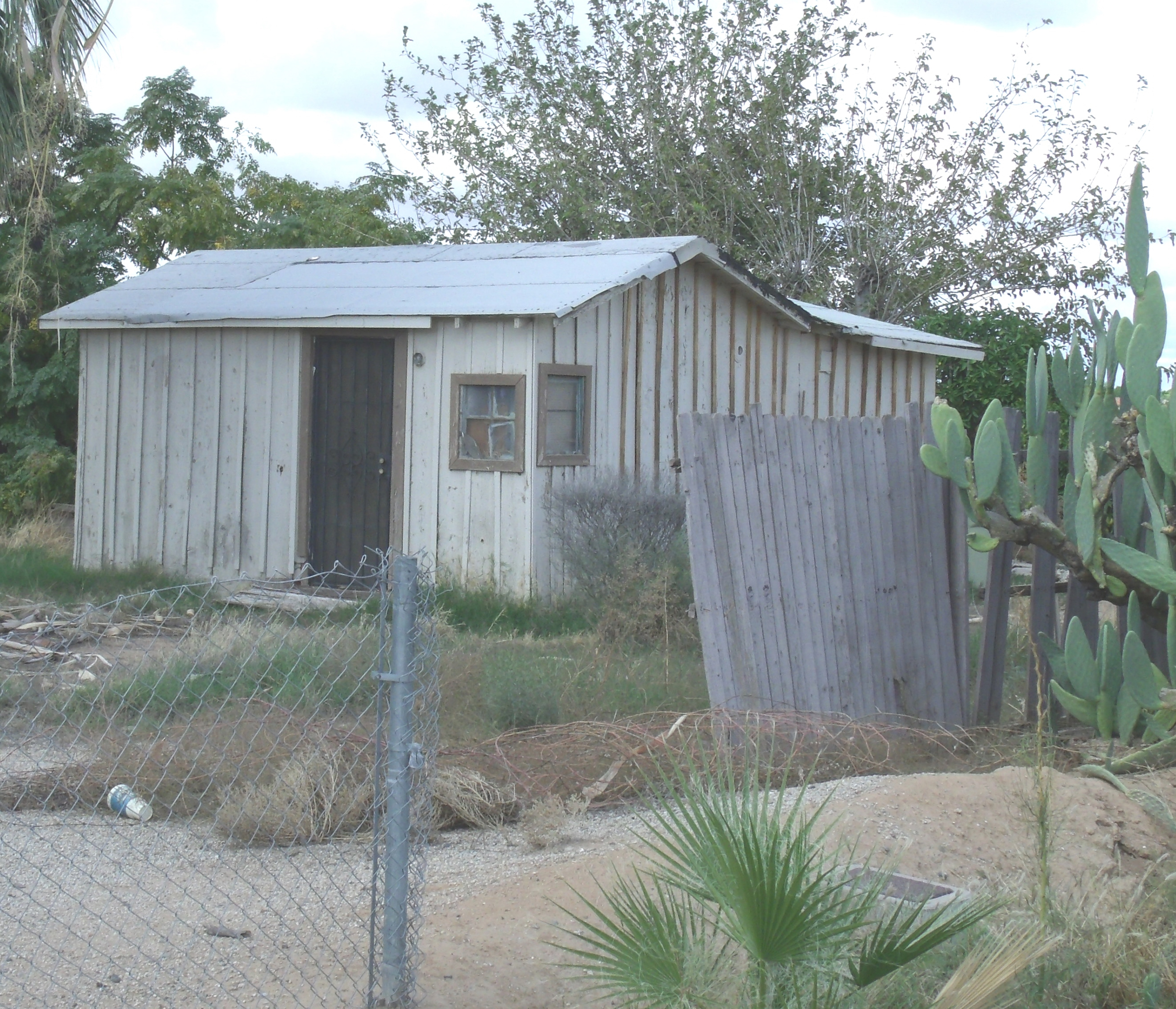
The abandoned 19th-century farm house

== Molokan Farmers Village houses ==
The Russian Spiritual Christians Cemetery, sometimes referred to as the Molokan Cemetery, was established in 1911 shortly after the Molokan's, arrived to buy farmlands in Glendale, Arizona. The Molokans, known as the Spiritual Christians, was a religious group which broke away from the Russian Orthodox Church because they believed that the Russian Government was going to force their youth to serve in the military. This was against their believes. They arrived and established a community in California. Some of these families, among them the Tomachoffs and the Popoffs moved to Glendale, and established a Russian Village. One of the factors which benefited them was the sugar beet factory of that town. The Sugar Beet Factory closed in 1913 and the demand for their agricultural products declined, that and the climate of the area convinced many families to return to California. The cemetery is considered to be a historical site. Pictured are the following:

- Griffith Ave. is a dead end street. It is the only remaining street of the once Russian (Molokan) Farmers Village.
- The first Russian Molokans Church (Spiritual Christians) in Glendale built in 1950 and located at 7402 Griffin Ave. The structure was re-addressed as 6404 75th Ave. The first members of this religion arrived in Glendale in 1911. It was at one time the spiritual center for 200 families. It is listed as historical by the Glendale Arizona Historical Society.
- The Molokan house which once belonged to Harry P. Tolmachoff.
- A Molokan house in Griffin Ave
Molokan Farmers Village houses
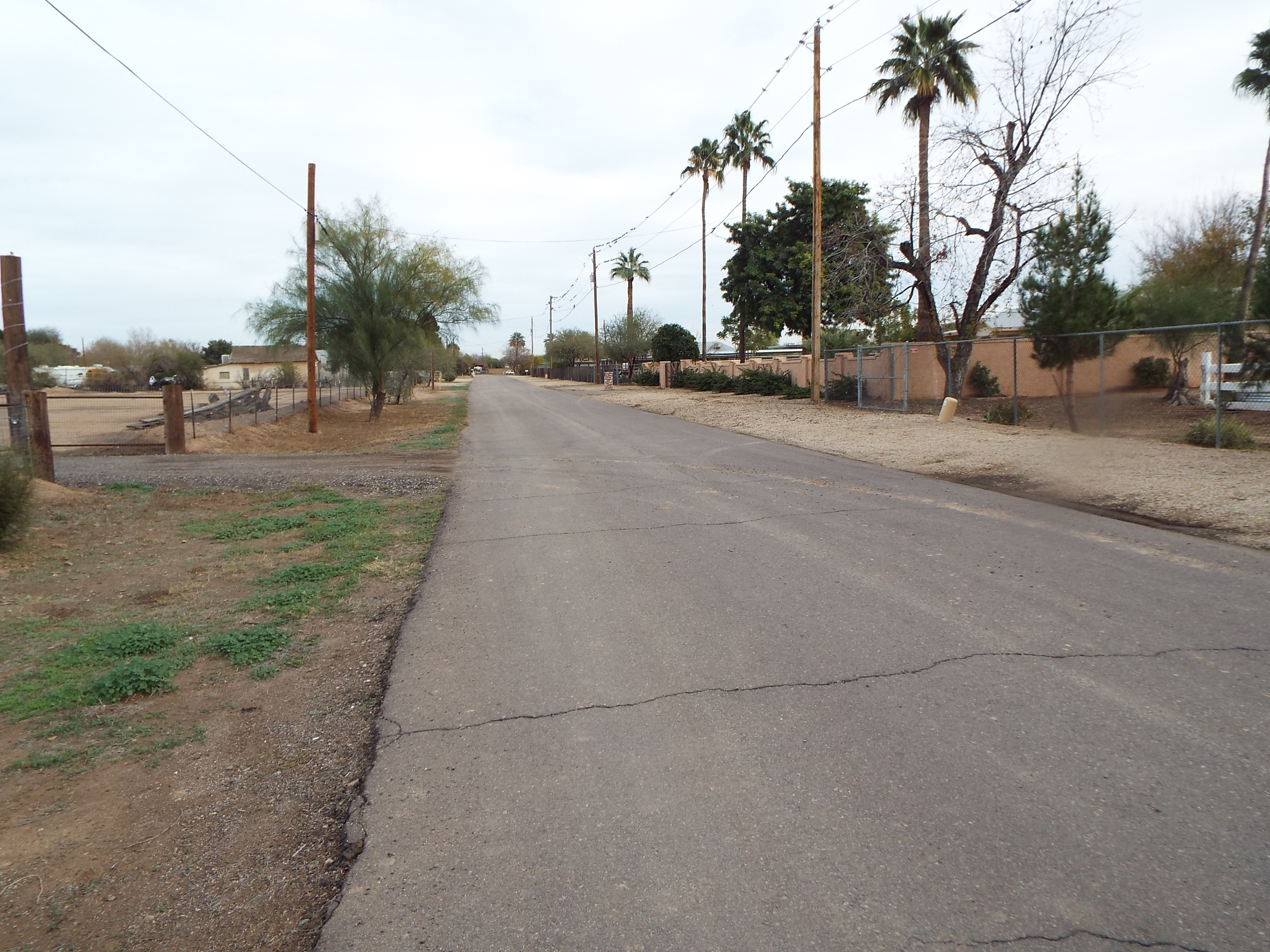
Griffith Ave.

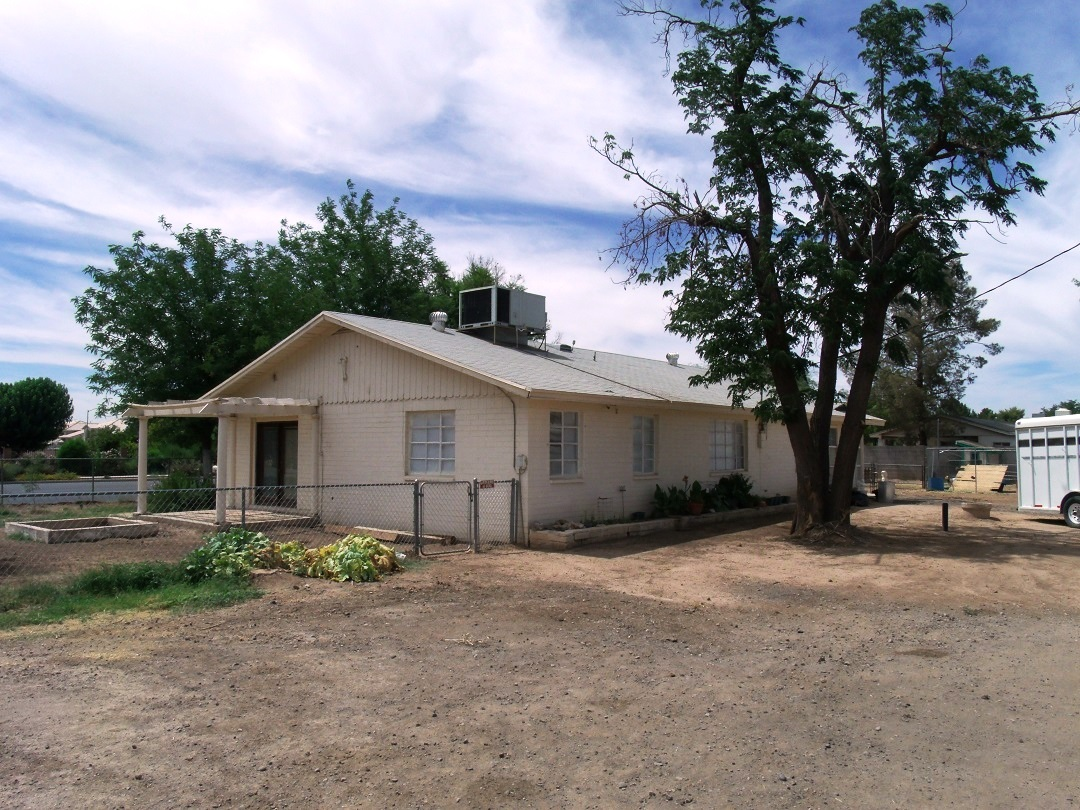
The Harry P. Tolmachoff House

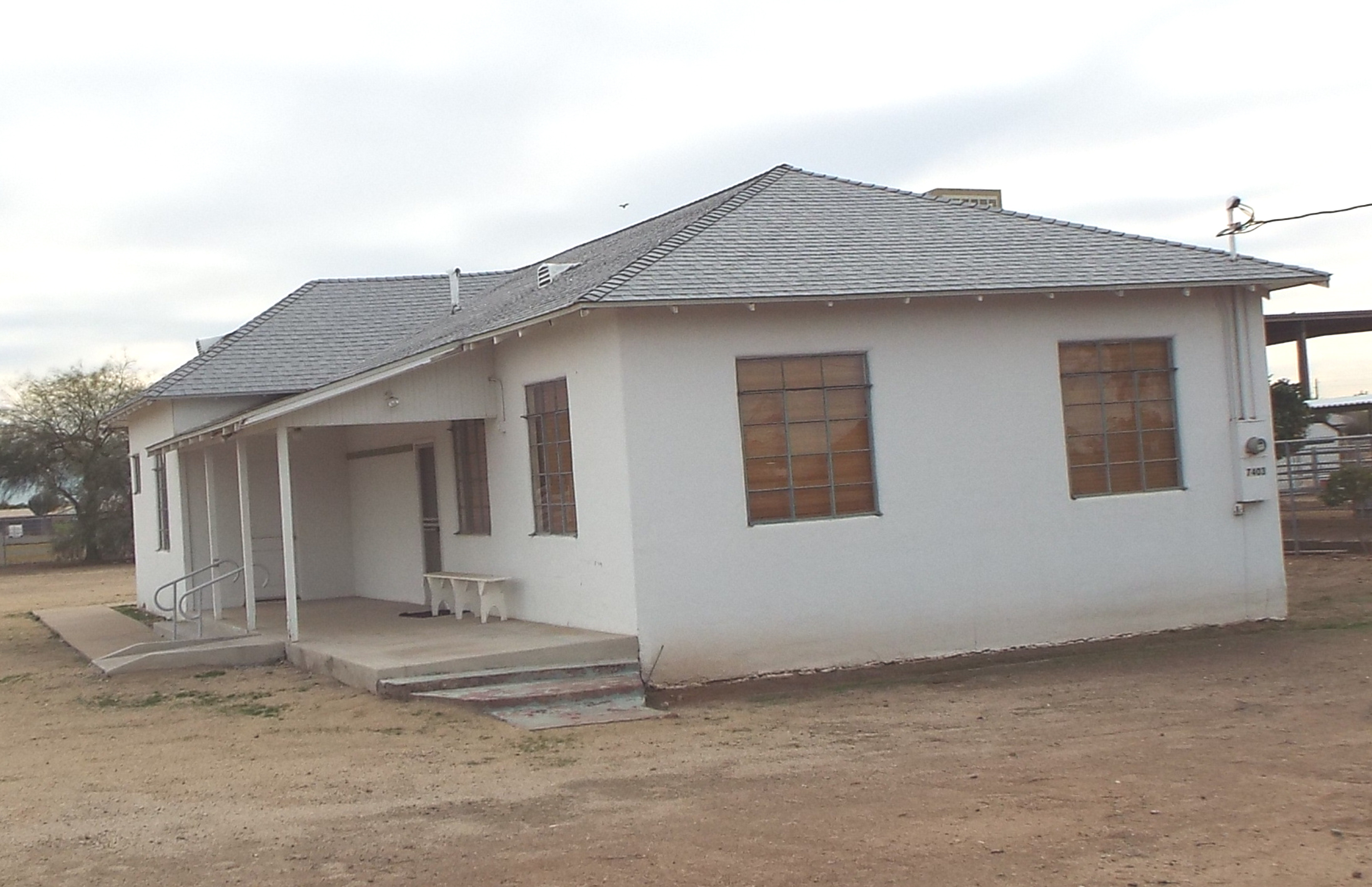
The first Russian Molokans Church (Spiritual Christians)

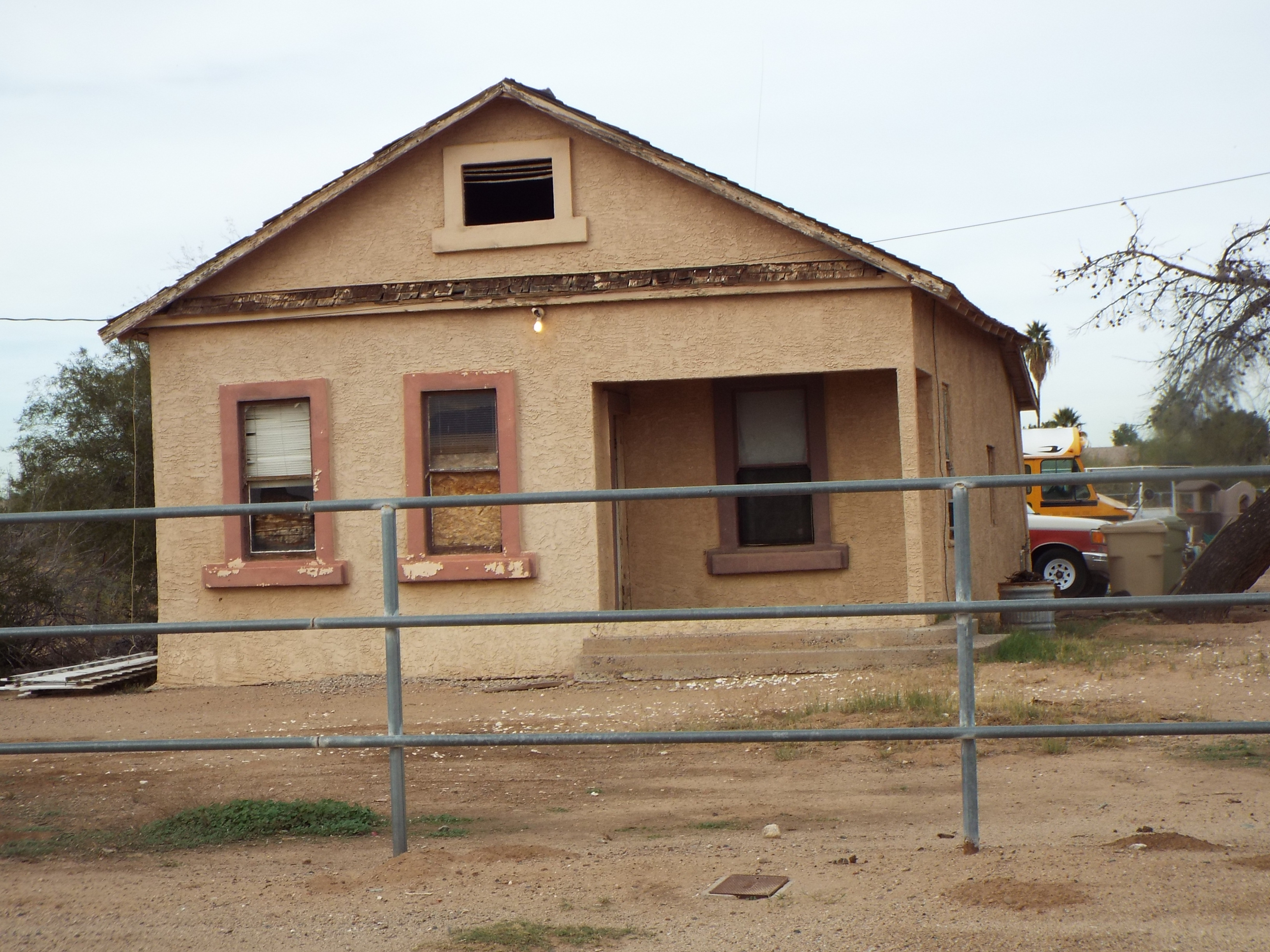
A Molokan house

=== Cemetery of Spiritual Christians from Russia ===
The following is a brief description with images of the historic Cemetery of Spiritual Christians from Russia.

- This cemetery on northeast corner of 75th and Maryland avenues was established after 1912 on land loaned by Pavel Popoff to various tribes of Spiritual Christians from Russia. Most were varieties of Klubnikinisty, Maksimisty, Obshchei, Pryguny, and Sionisty. In 1918–19 about a dozen children died of influenza and were buried in unmarked graves along the east edge. Such unnatural deaths were believed to be "unclean" (nechistyy), and not marked. Traditional old Russian wood grave planks called golubez, pointed with a small roof, represented the "house" (dom) of the deceased. No crosses or images were used because Spiritual Christians are not Orthodox. No records of the early graves exist because the most zealous Spiritual Christians feared the government. In 1920 this cemetery served about 200 families (1000+ people) of mixed Spiritual Christian faiths from Russia, living in four adjacent villages. In the 1920s, most families could not pay their debts and moved to California, some to Mexico. About 1922, Popoff sold the property to a trustee to prevent it from being controlled by his zealous Tolmachoff in-laws. The collection of funds raised to pay for the land was recorded and shows that people who moved to California paid the most, and the entire Tolmachoff contribution was about 2%. In 2016 one gang of Tolmachoff brothers illegally forged documents, lied to police, stole the bank account, and claimed they "inherited" the meeting hall and cemetery property, changed locks and prevented anyone else from using the properties. Glendale Police and Arizona Attorney General avoid prosecuting white collar crime.
- Graves belonging to the Popoff family. Pavel Popoff's wife was a Tomachoff.
- Graves of the Tomachoff families.
- The graves of Nellie and Peter Popoff with Russian inscription.
Cemetery of Spiritual Christians from Russia
(GAHS=Glendale Arizona Historic Society-listed)
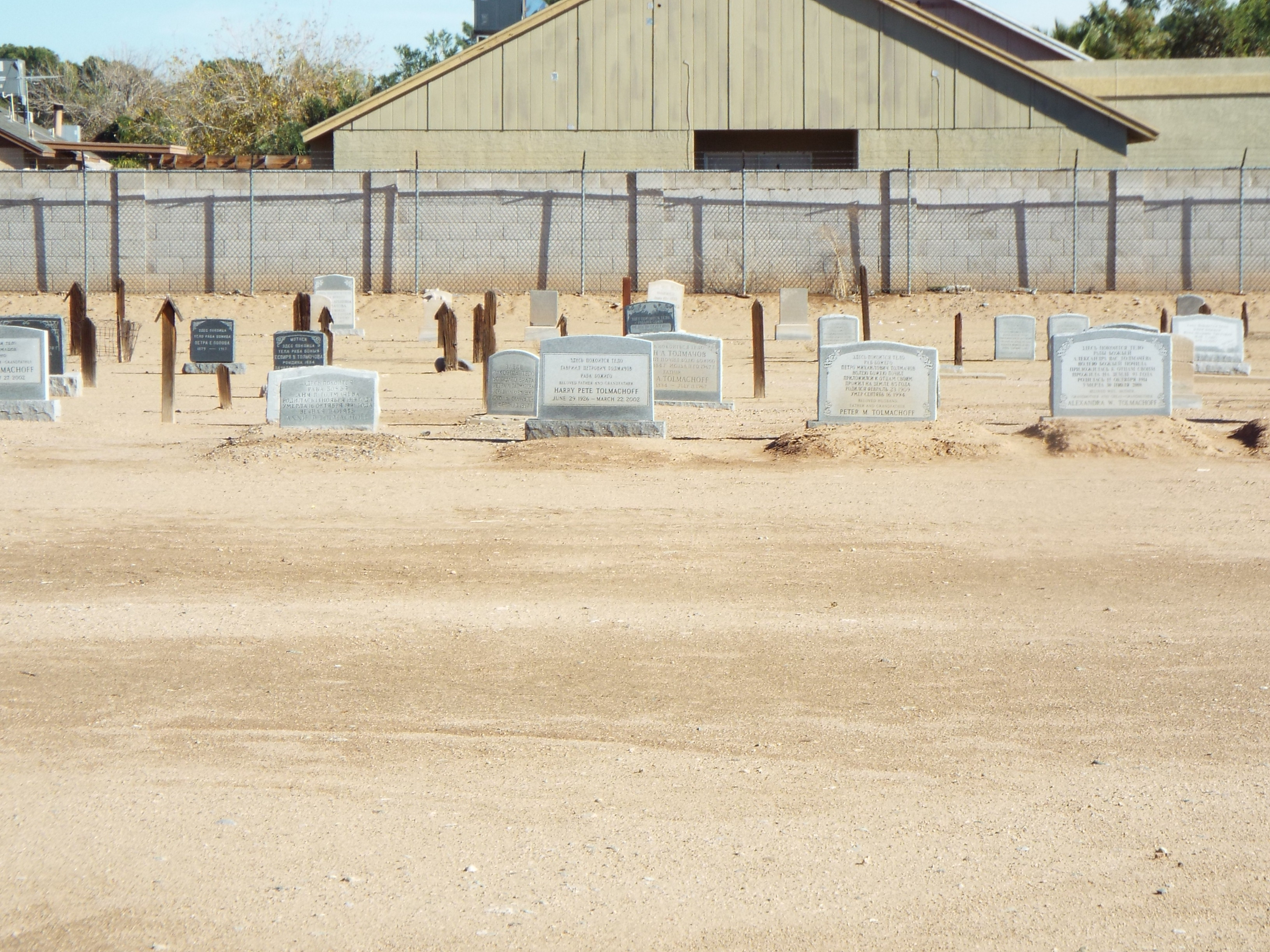
The historic Cemetery of Spiritual Christians from Russia.

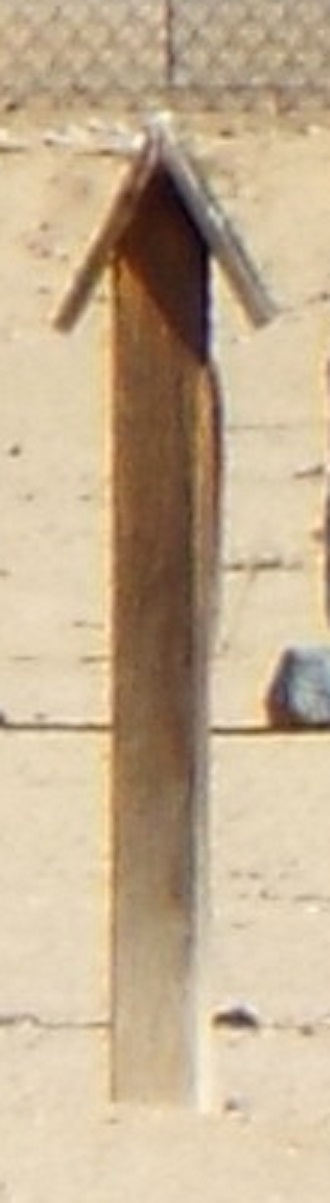
The Old Posts

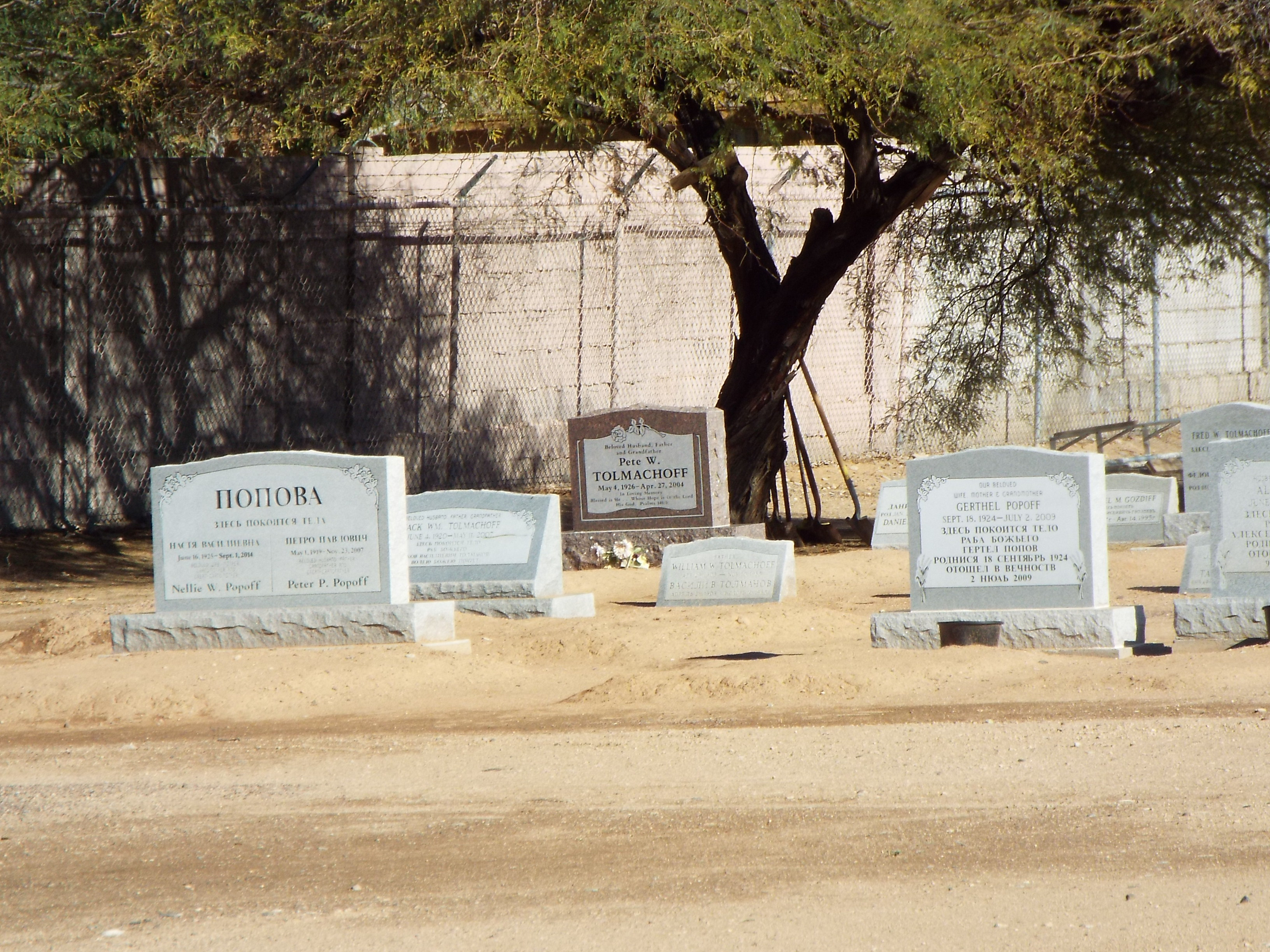
Graves of the Popoff family

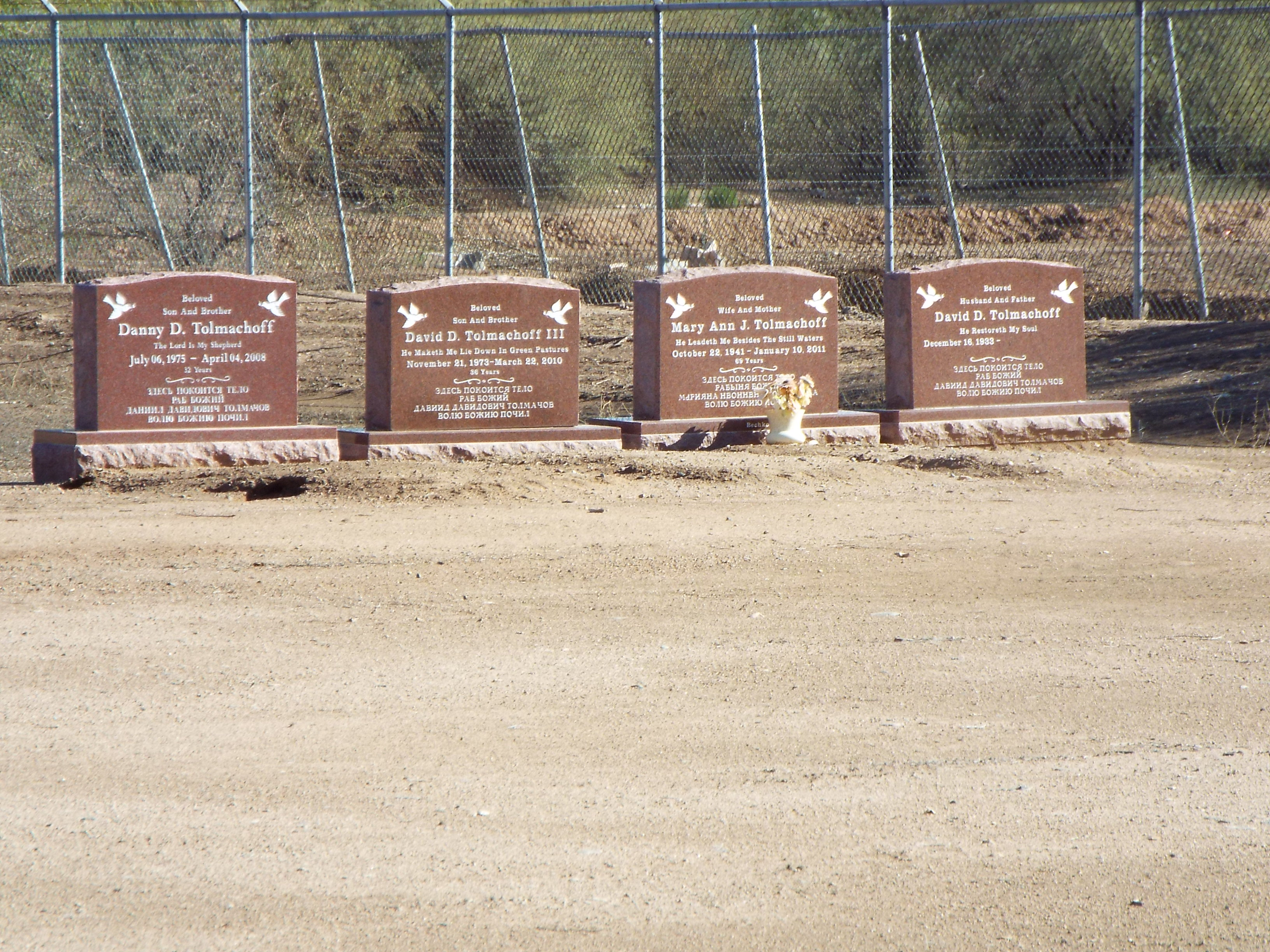
Graves of the Tomachoff family

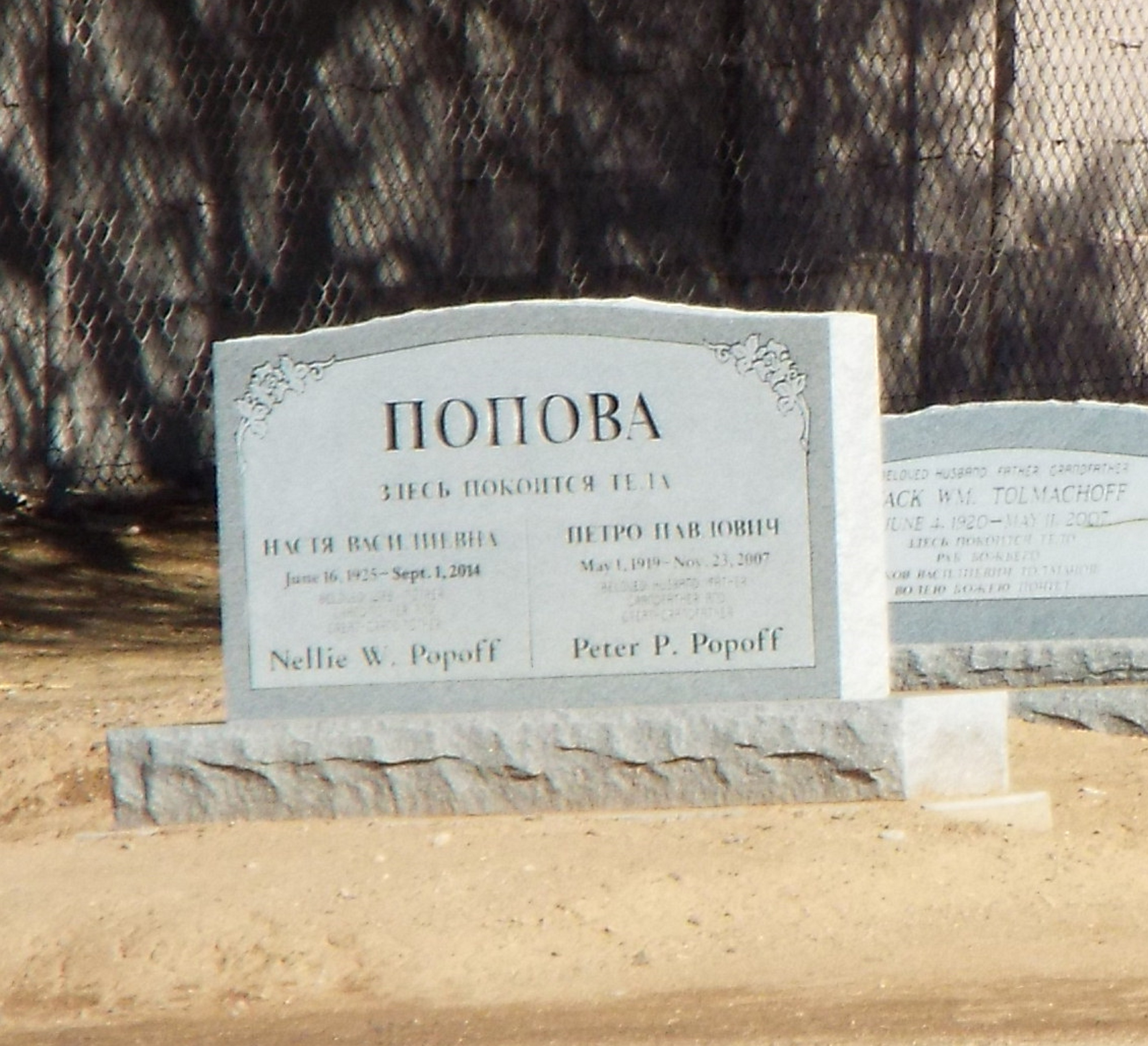
Graves of Nellie and Peter Popoff

== Tolmachoff Farms ==
The historic Tolmachoff Farms in Glendale was established in 1912 by the Tolmachoff family, who were among the early Russian families who immigrated and settled in Glendale, Arizona. The farm is located at 5726 N. 75th Avenue in Glendale.

Tolmachoff Farms

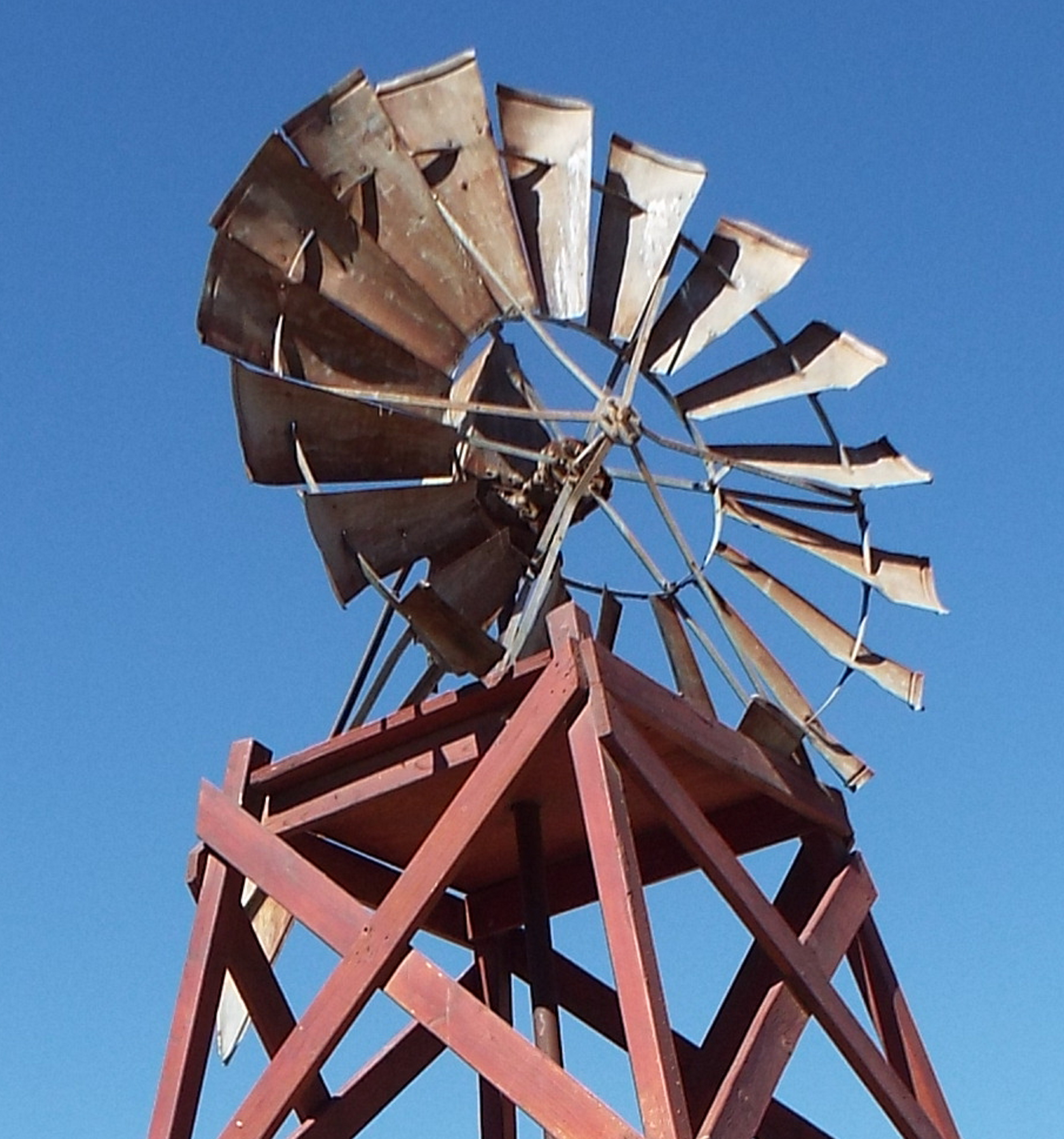
The Steel Star open back-geared steel windmill was manufactured by Flint & Walling Manufacturing Co., Kendallville, Indiana, c. 1910.

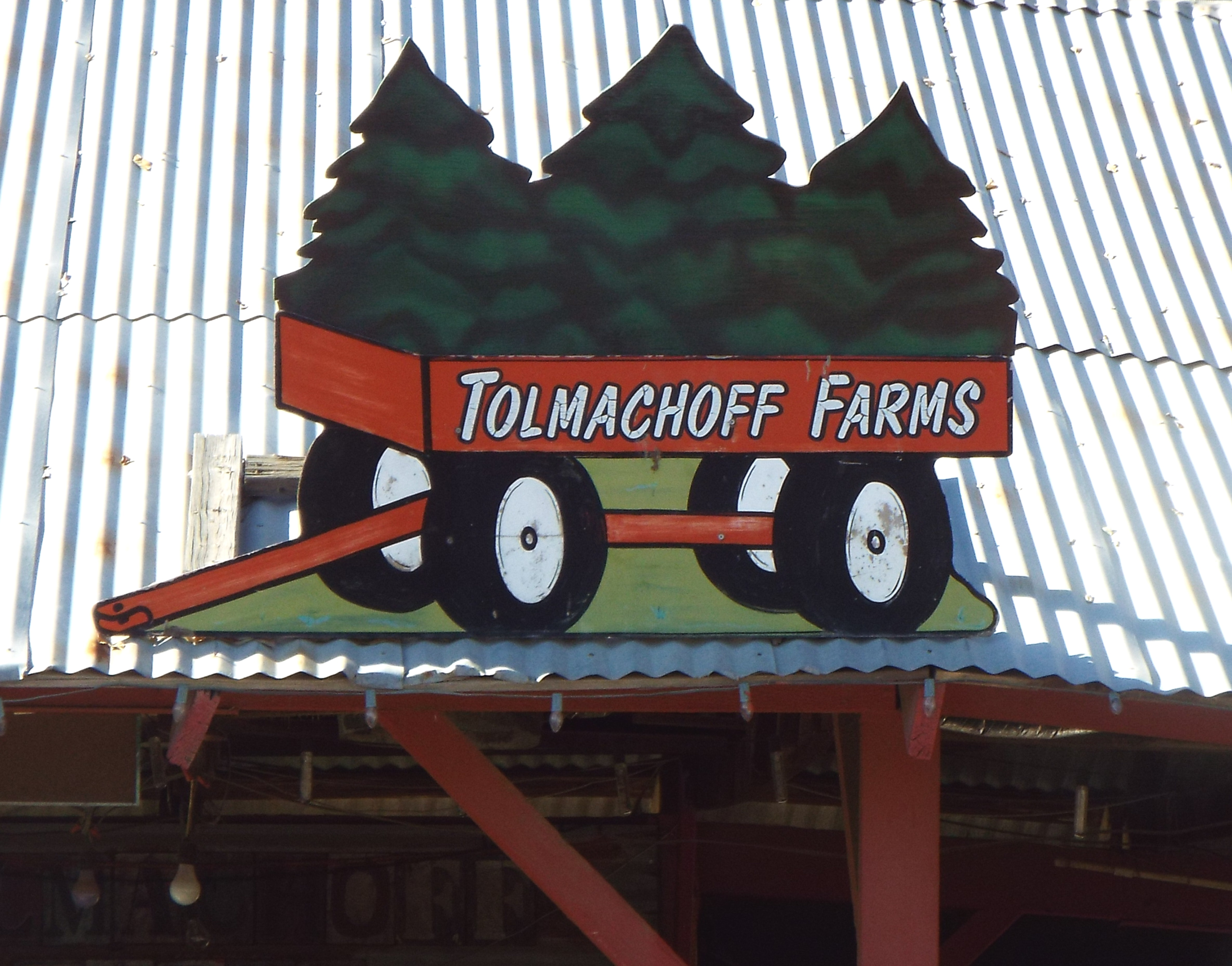
Entrance to the Tomachoff farms

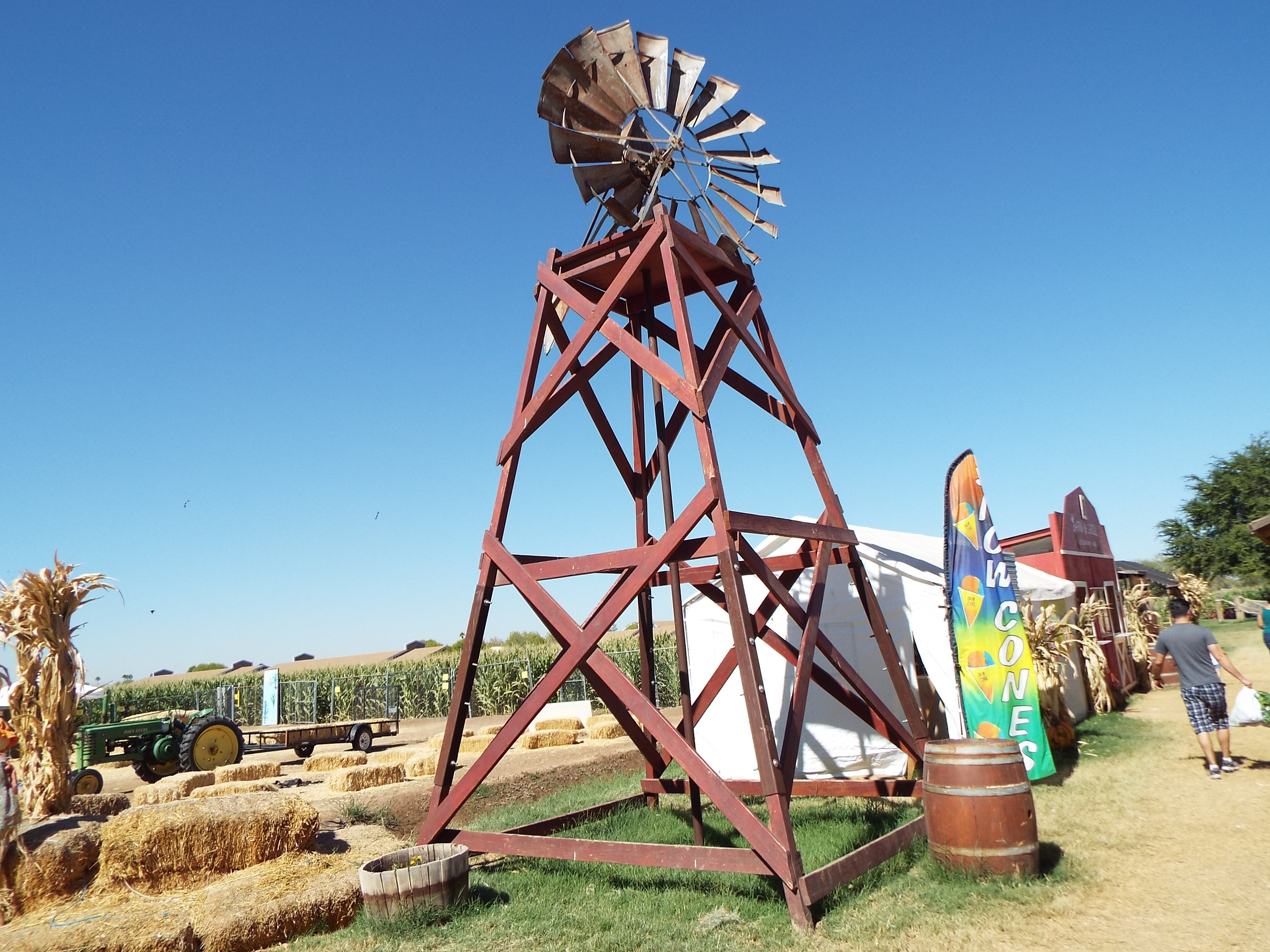
The Steel Star open back-geared steel windmill

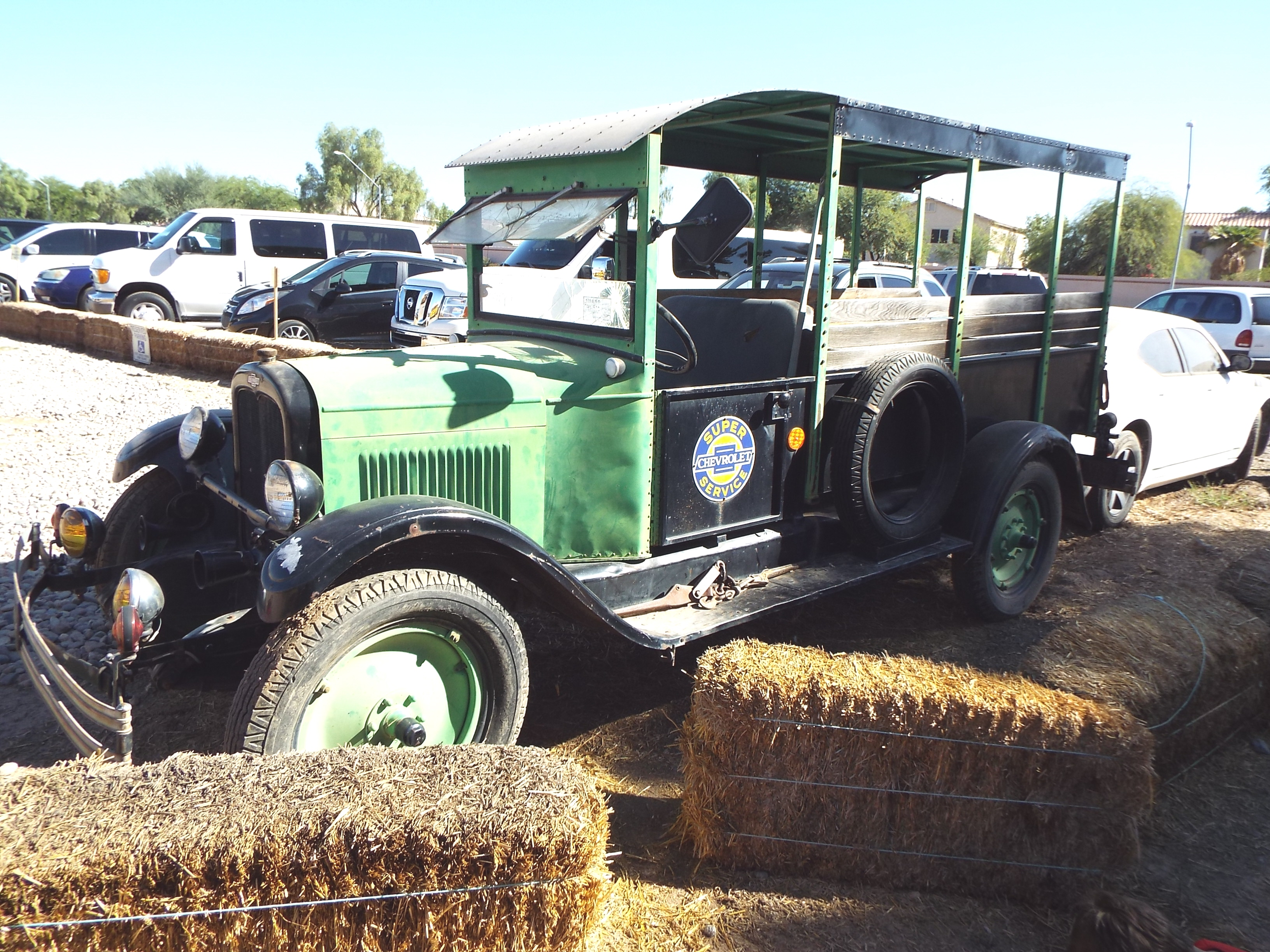
A 1927 Chevrolet truck once used in the historic Tolmachoff Farm

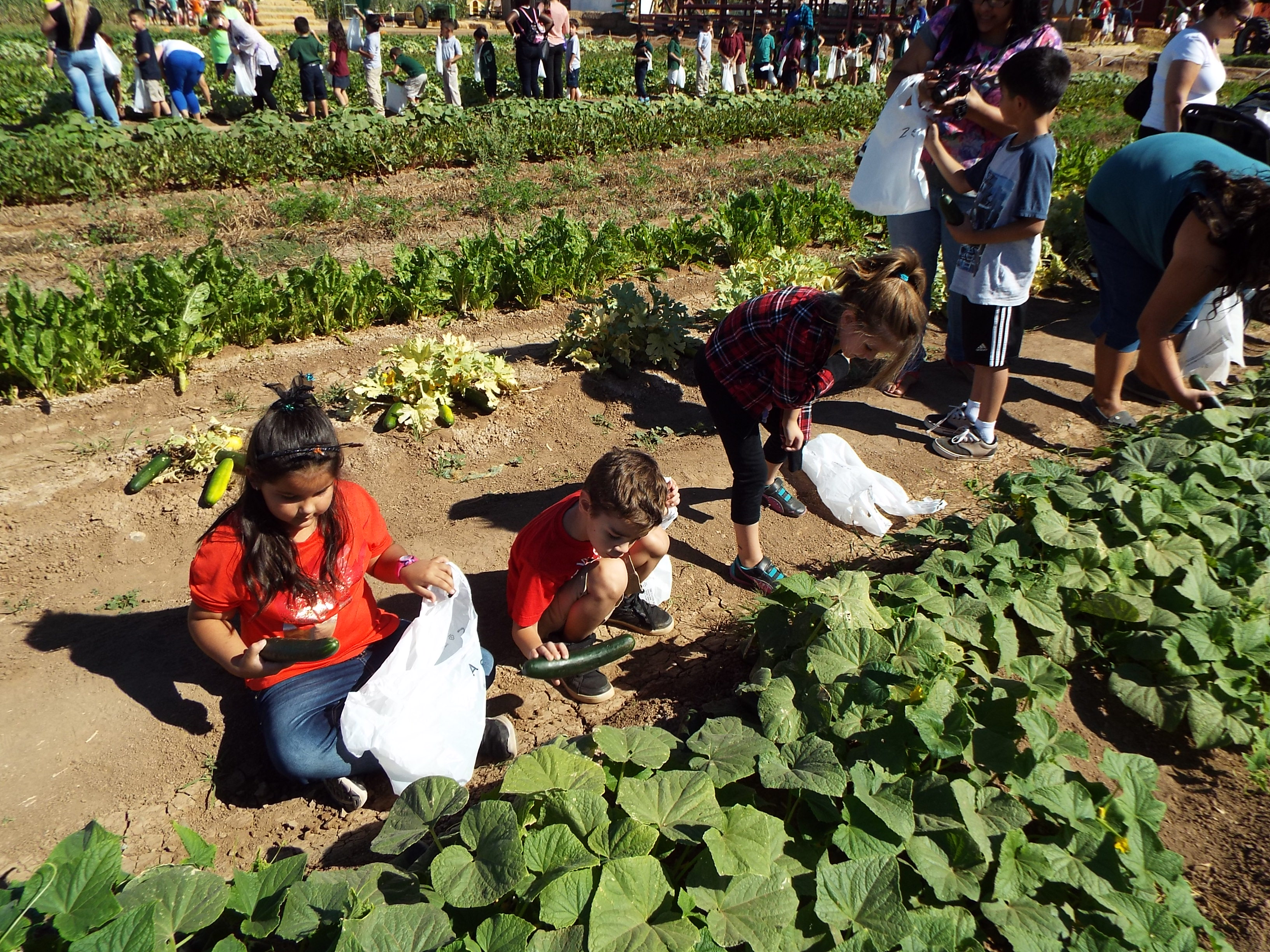
Children farming in the Tolmachoff Farm

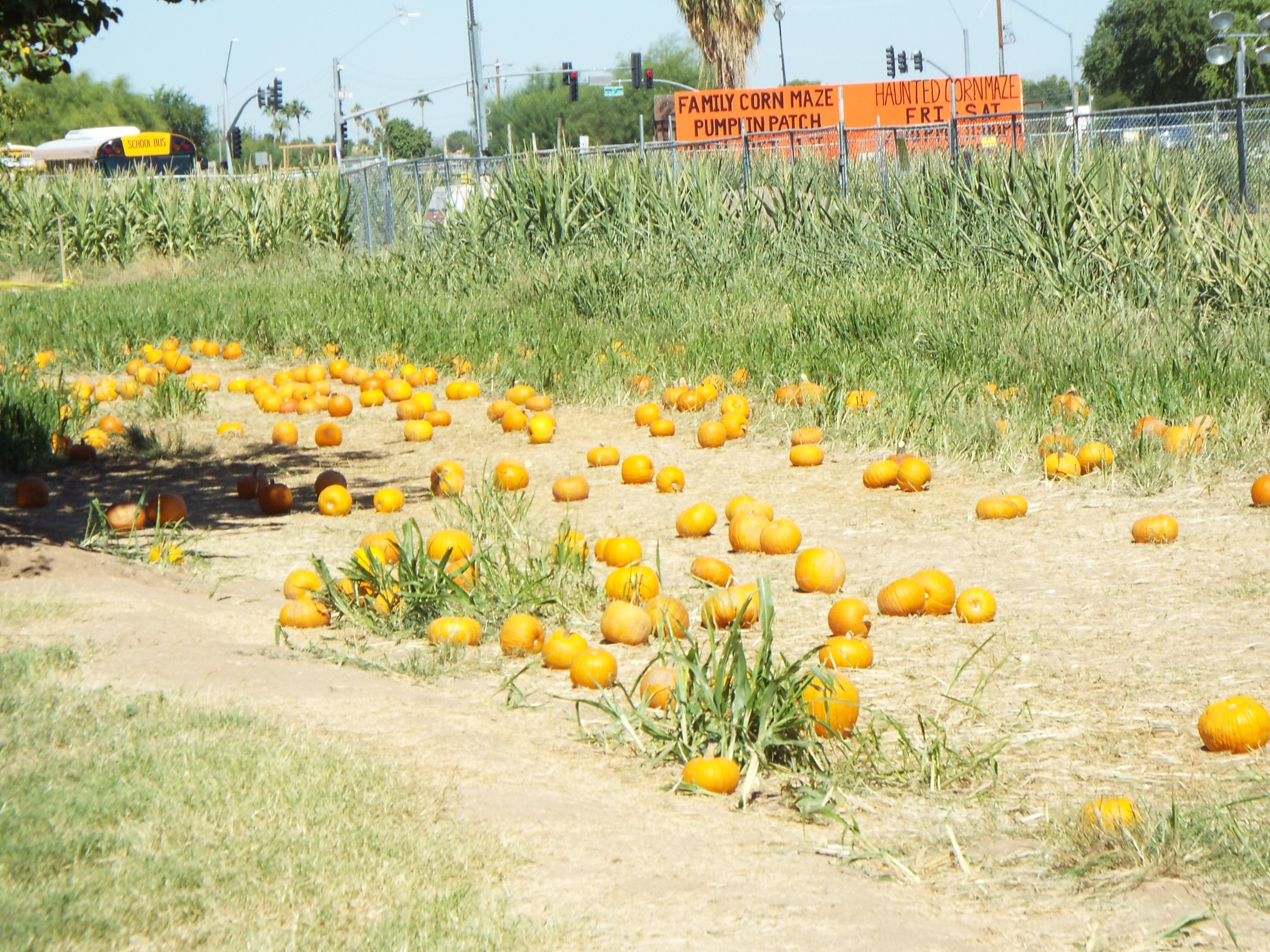
Tolmachoff Farm pumpkin patch

== Catlin Court Historic District ==
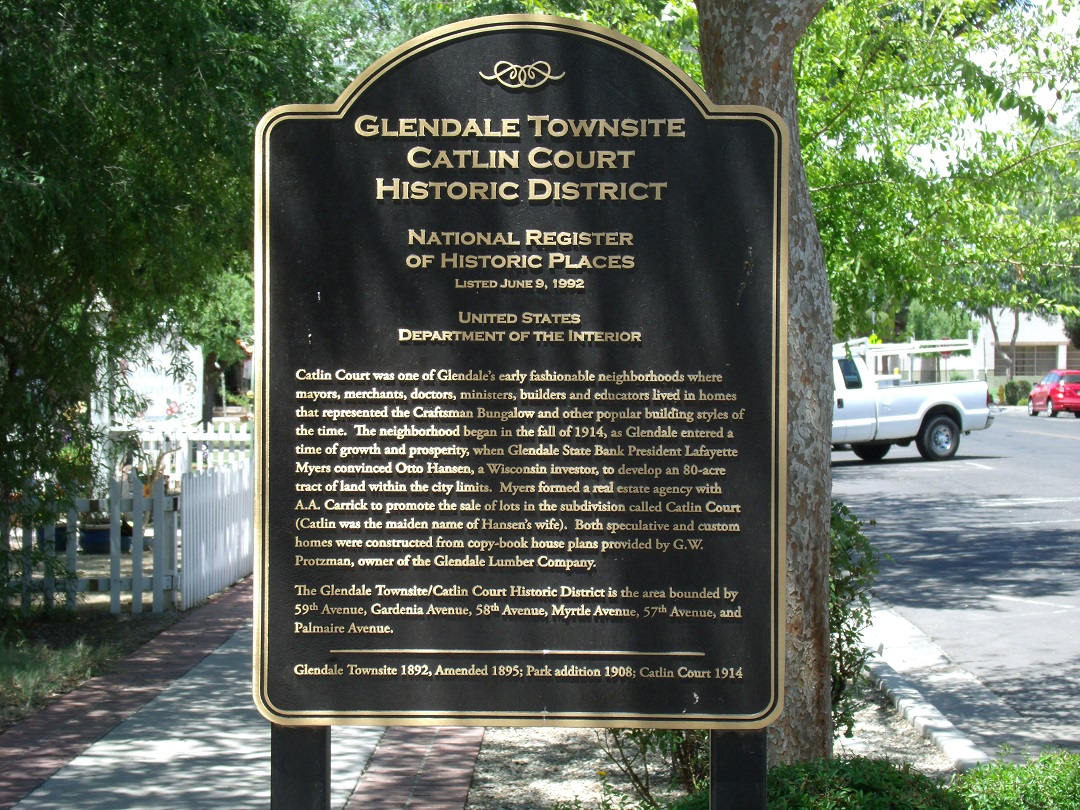
National Register of Historic Places “Catlin Court Historic District” Marker.

The Catlin Court Historic District, established in 1914, is significant for its historic association with an important period in the development of the city of Glendale, Arizona. The Catlin Court Historic District which is located in the area bounded by Gardenia Ave., 59th Ave., Palmarie Ave. and 58th Ave. is one of nine historic districts in Glendale, Arizona listed in the National Register of Historic Places. The district was listed in the National Register of Historic Places on June 9, 1992.

== Thunderbird 1 Army Air Field ==
The historic Thunderbird 1 Army Air Field was built in 1941. The Control Tower served as the Air Control Tower and Officers' quarters during the operation of the Thunderbird 1 Army Air Field, in Glendale. There American, British, Canadian and Chinese pilots trained during WWII. The air field was deactivated in 1945 and is now occupied by the Thunderbird School of Global Management which is located southeast of the intersection of West Greenway Road & North 59th Avenue in Glendale, Arizona. Pictured are the following:

- The Thunderbird Control Tower
- The Thunderbird 1 Army Air Field Airplane Hangar.
- The Thunderbird 1 Army Air Field barracks used during World War II by the pilots.
- The Thunderbird Pilots Memorial dedicated to the American, British, Canadian and Chinese pilots who trained there during WWII.
Thunderbird 1 Army Air Field
Listed as historical in the Glendale Arizona Historical Society.

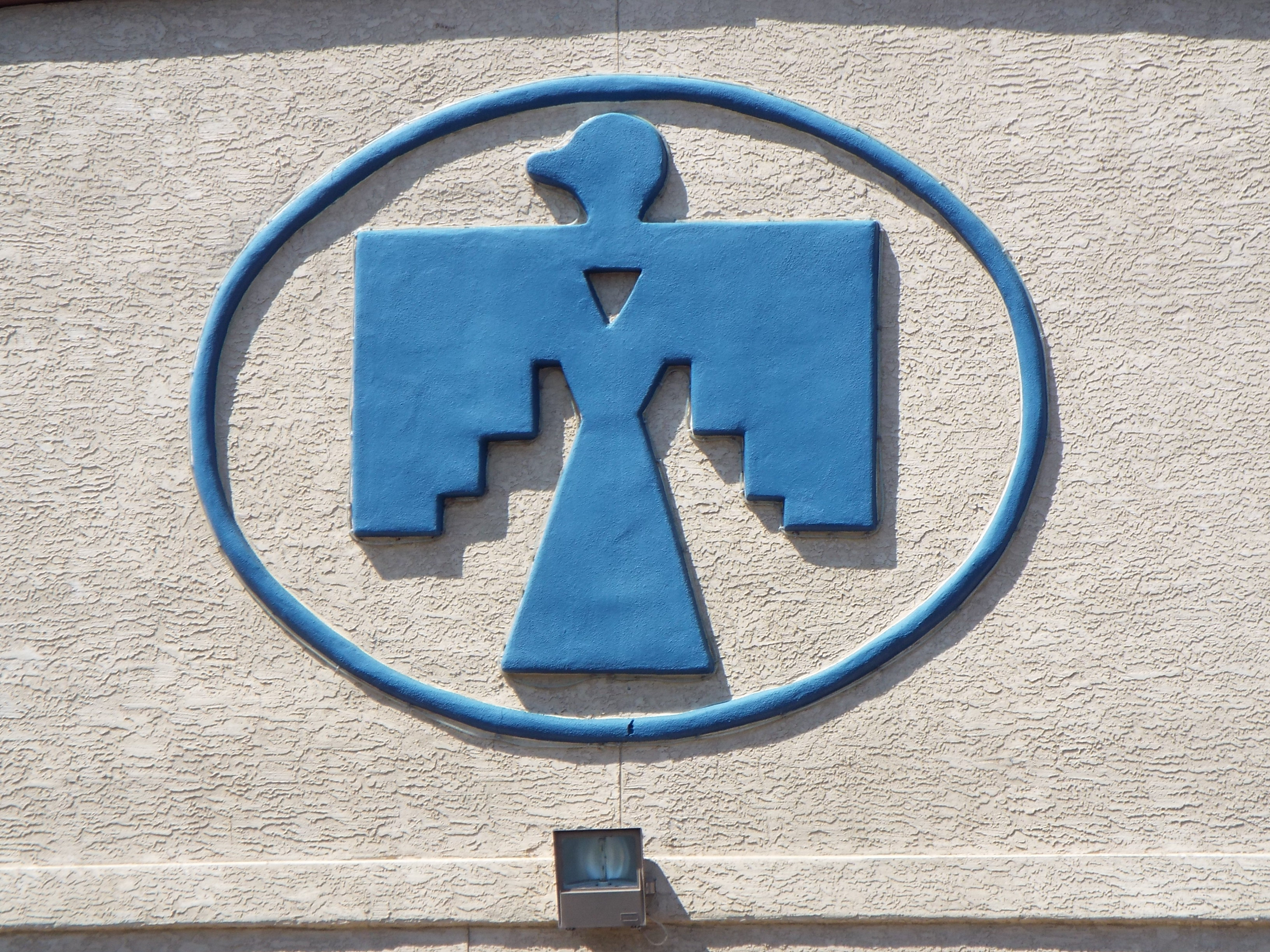
Thunderbird 1 Army Air Field emblem

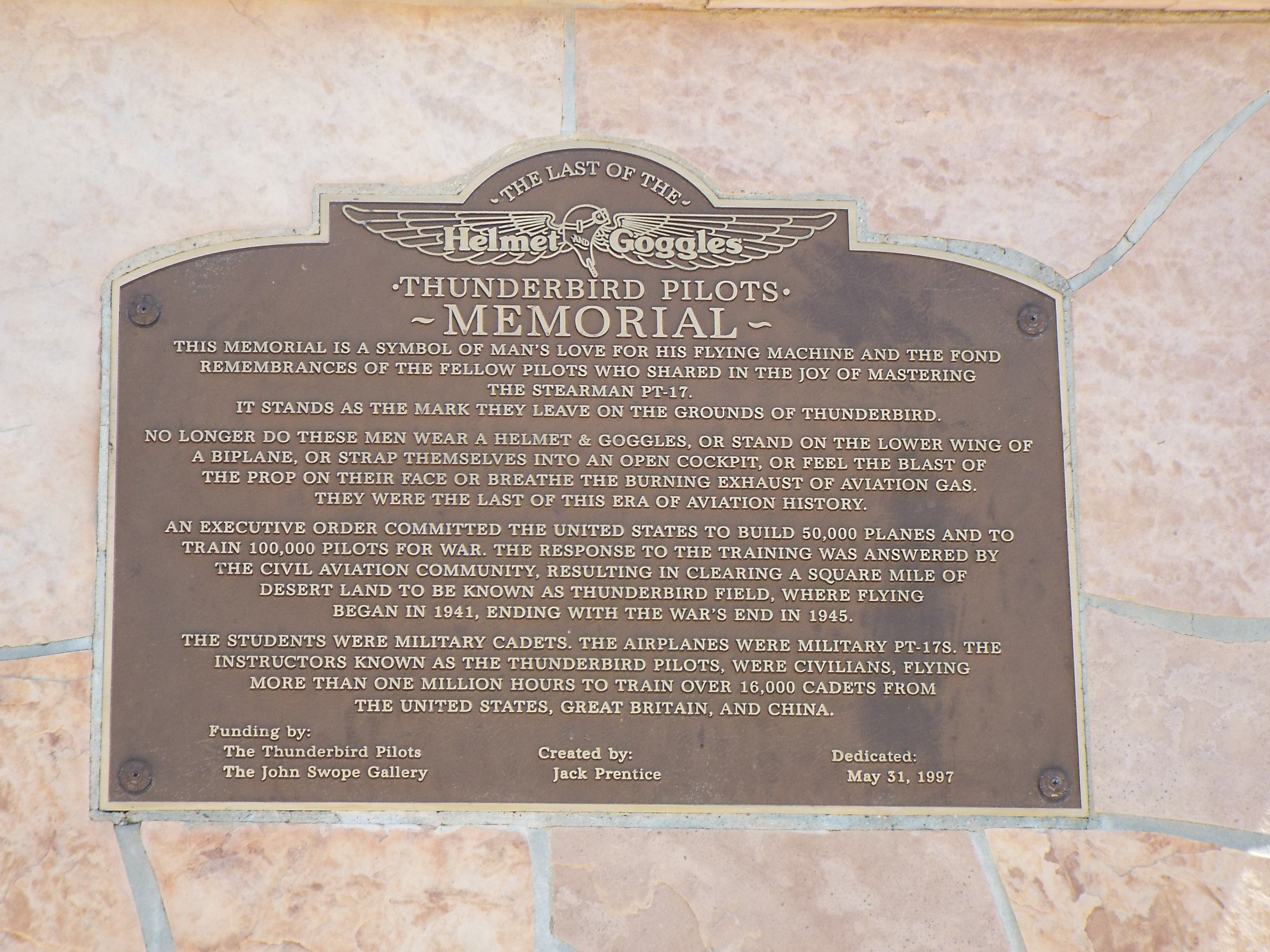
Memorial Plaque

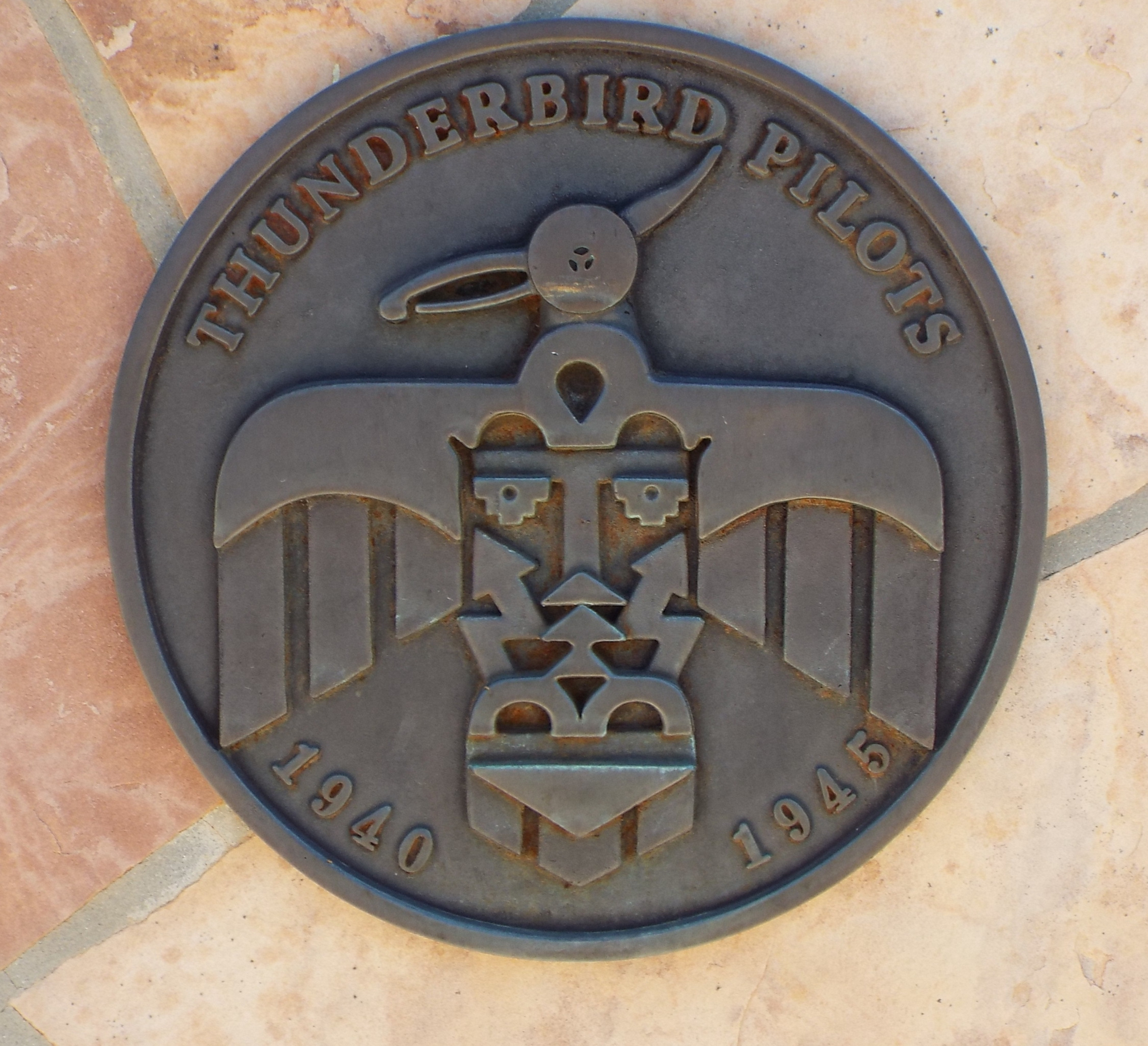
Thunderbird Pilots Memorial Marker

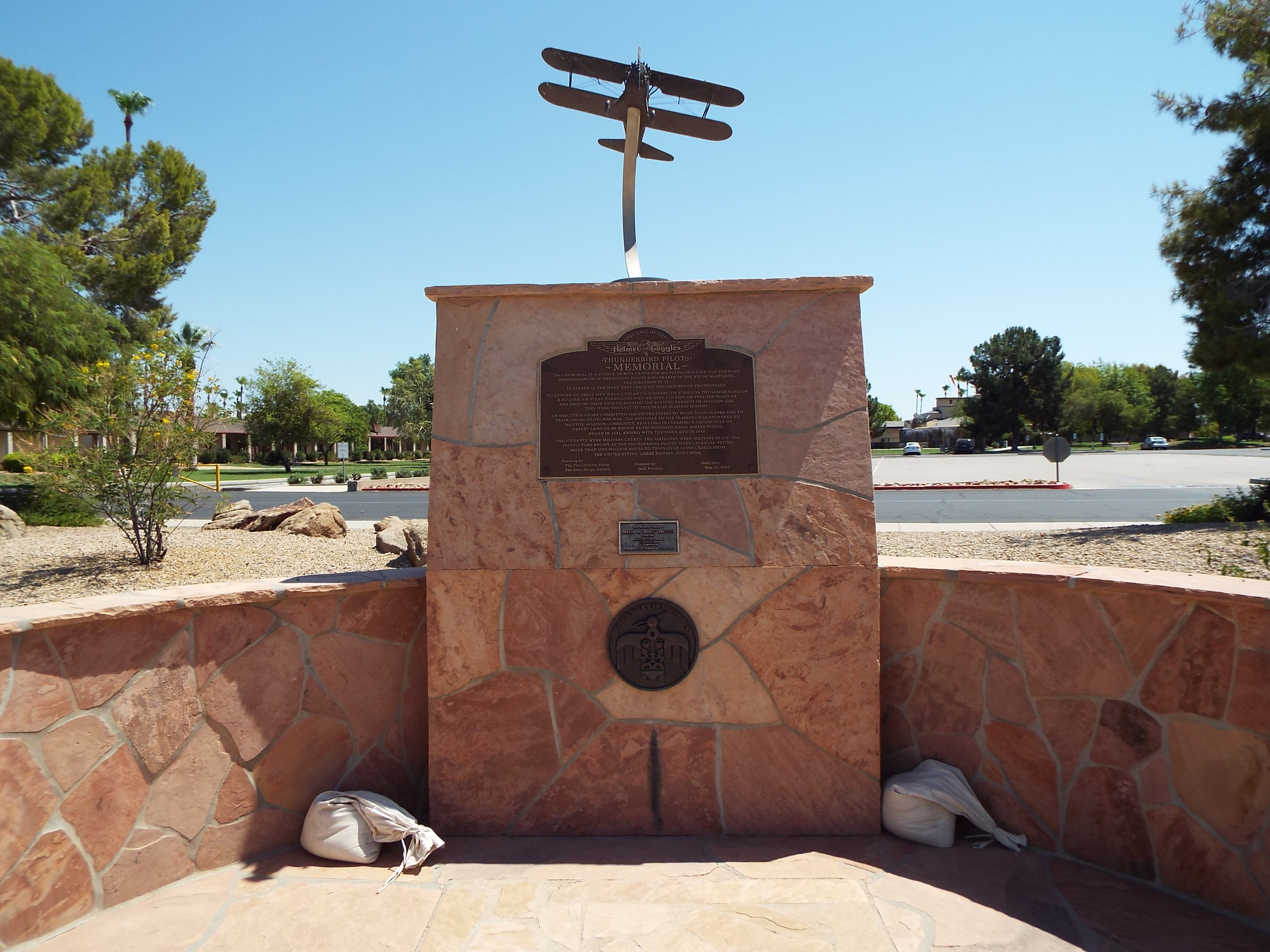
'Thunderbird Pilots Memorial.

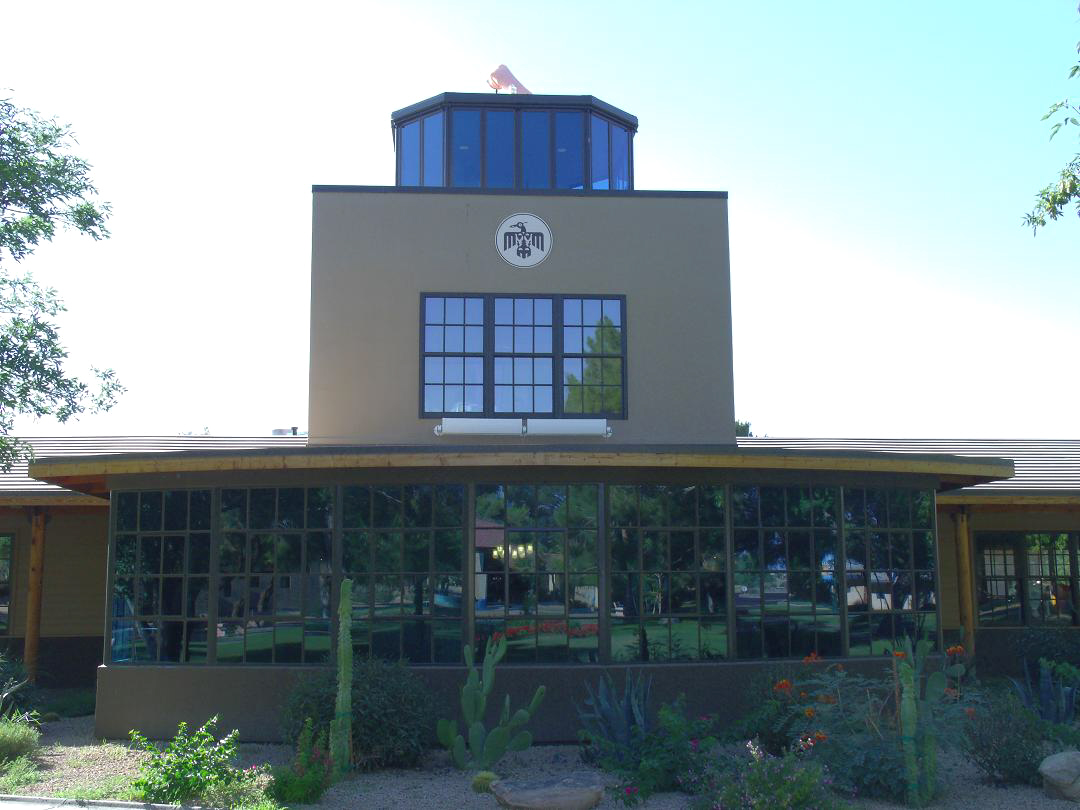
The historic Thunderbird Control Tower.

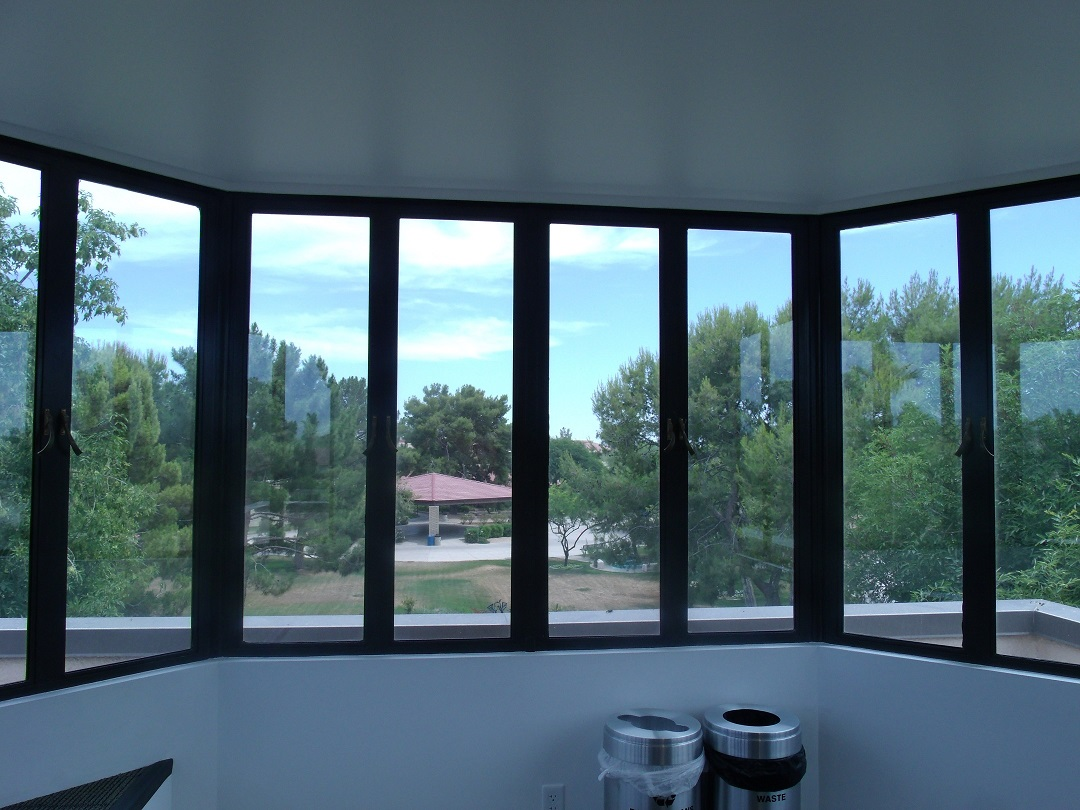
View from the inside of the historic Thunderbird Control Tower station.

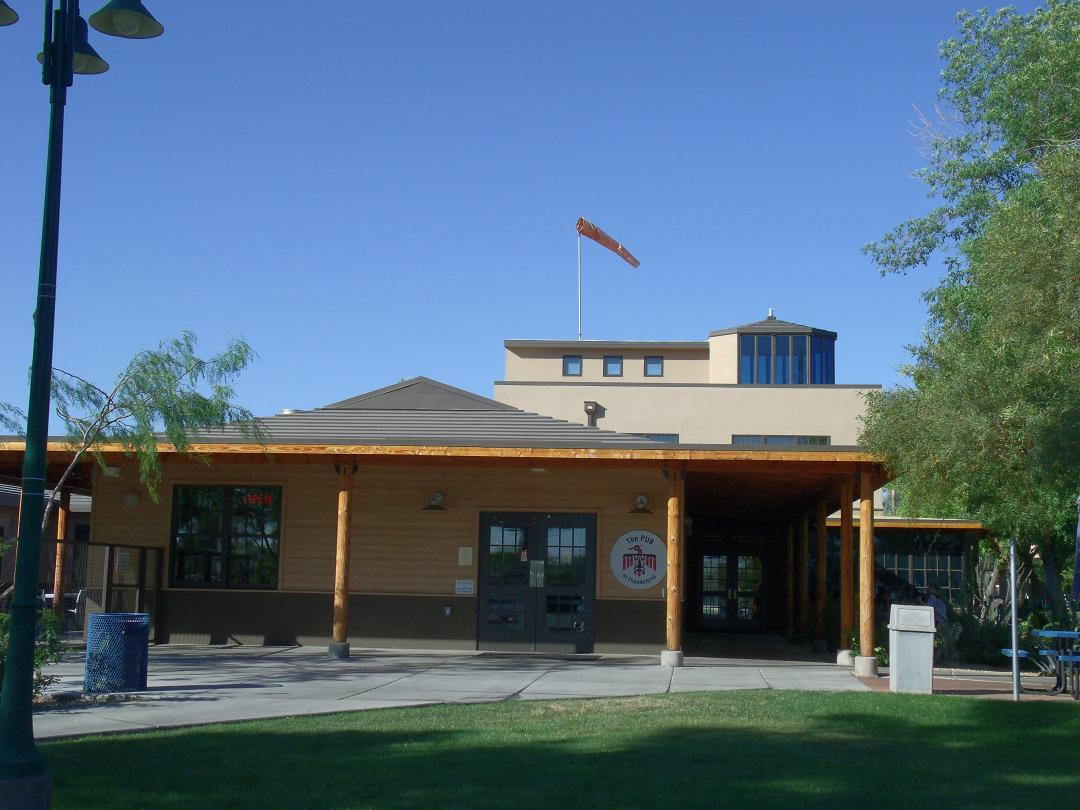
Different view of the historic Thunderbird Control Tower.

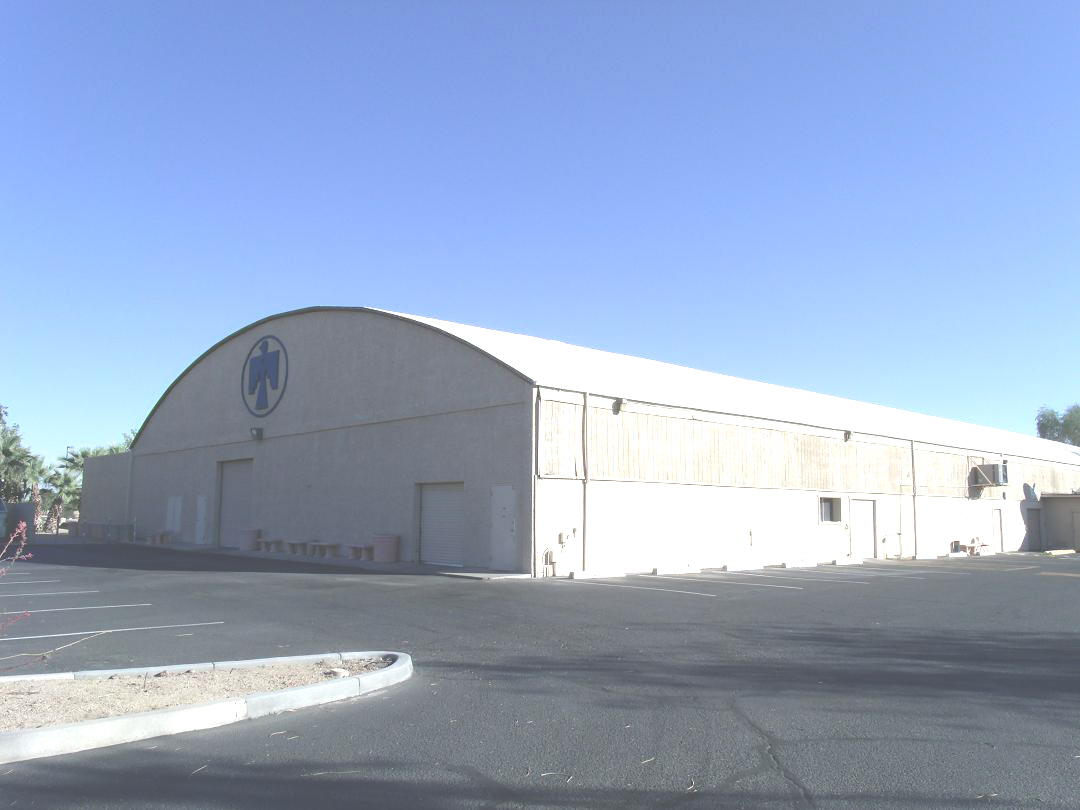
The Thunderbird 1 Army Air Field Airplane Hangar.

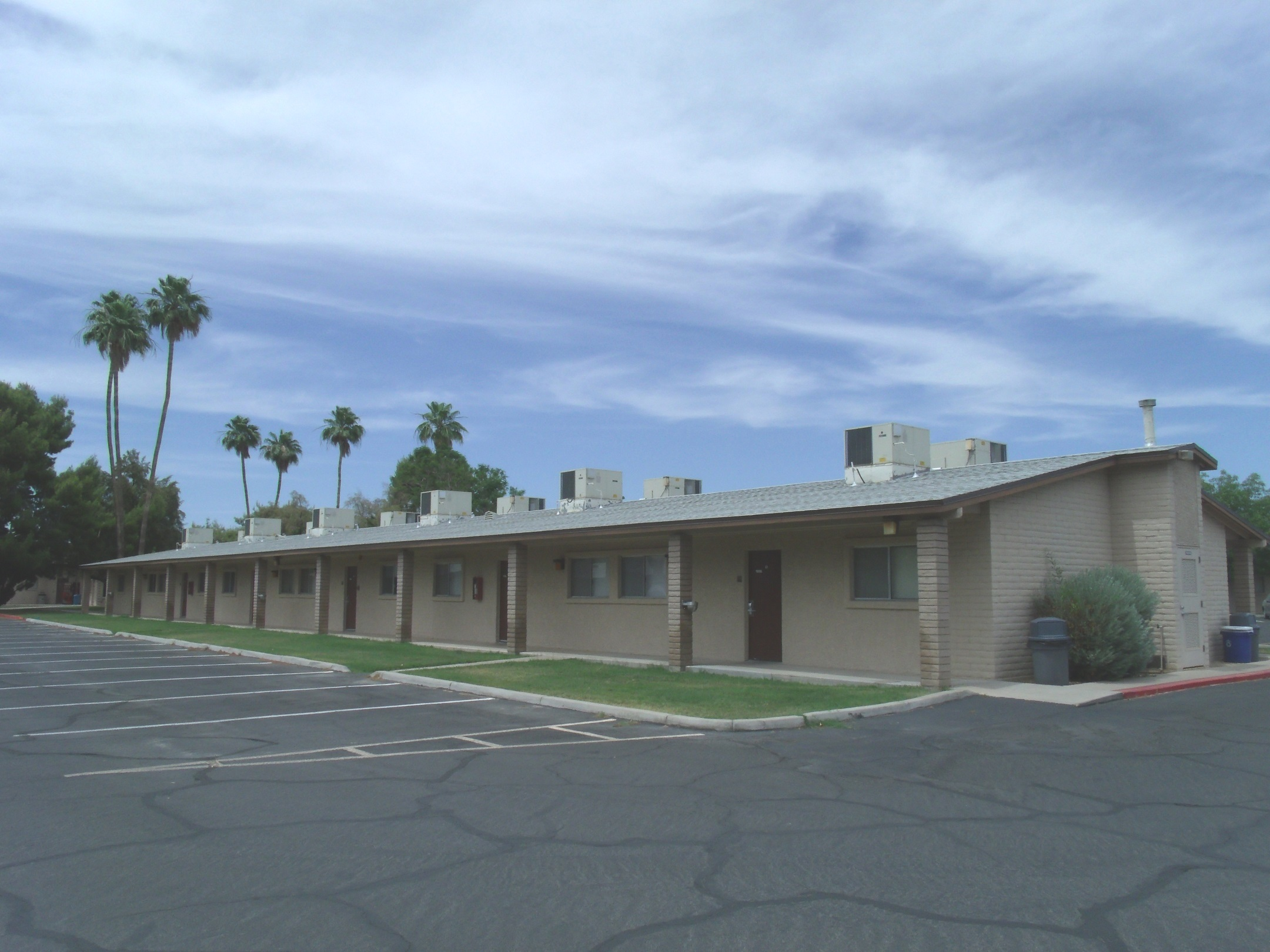
The Thunderbird 1 Army Air Field barracks.

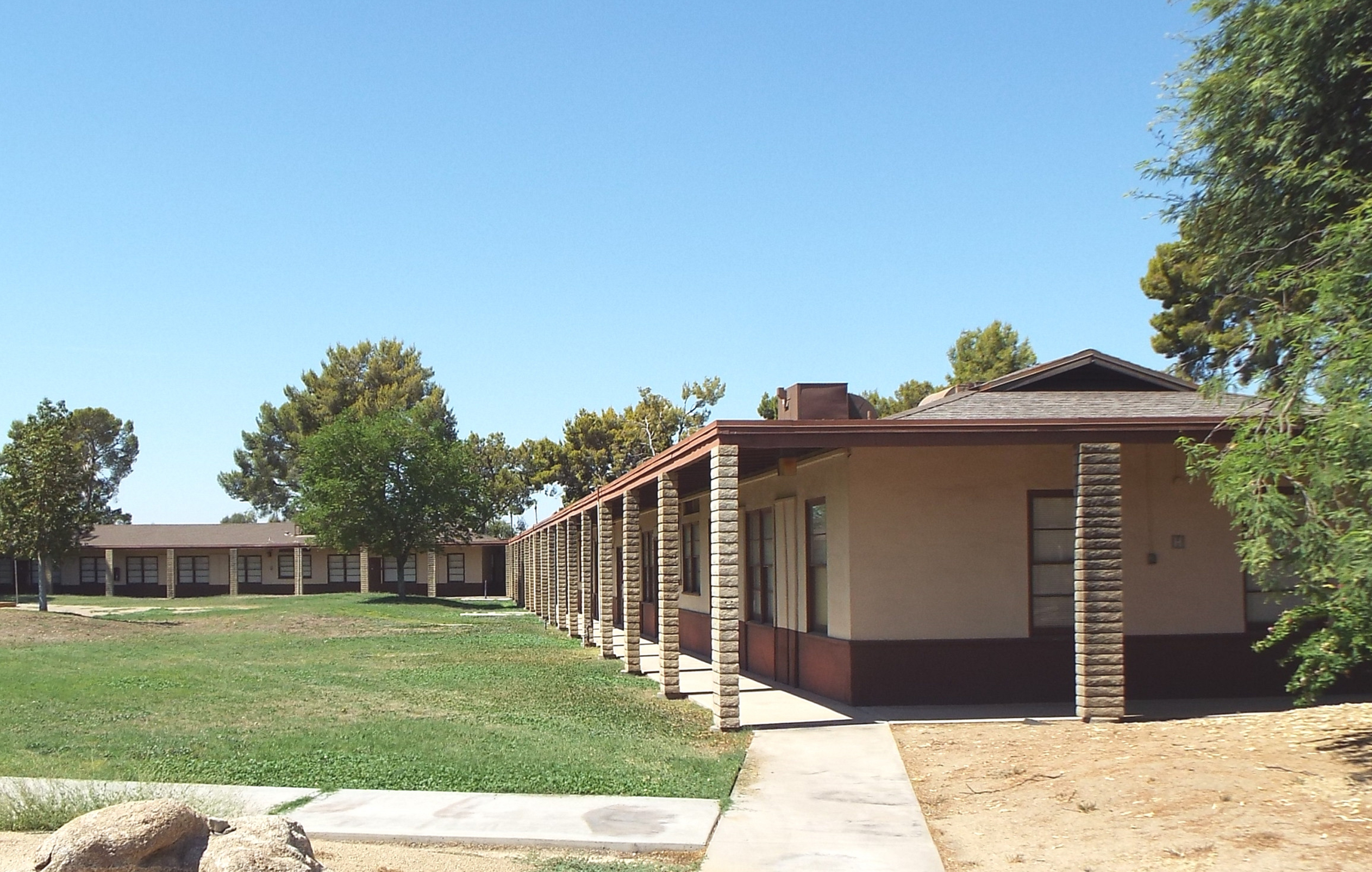
Additional barracks.

== Cemeteries ==
=== Glendale Memorial Park Cemetery ===
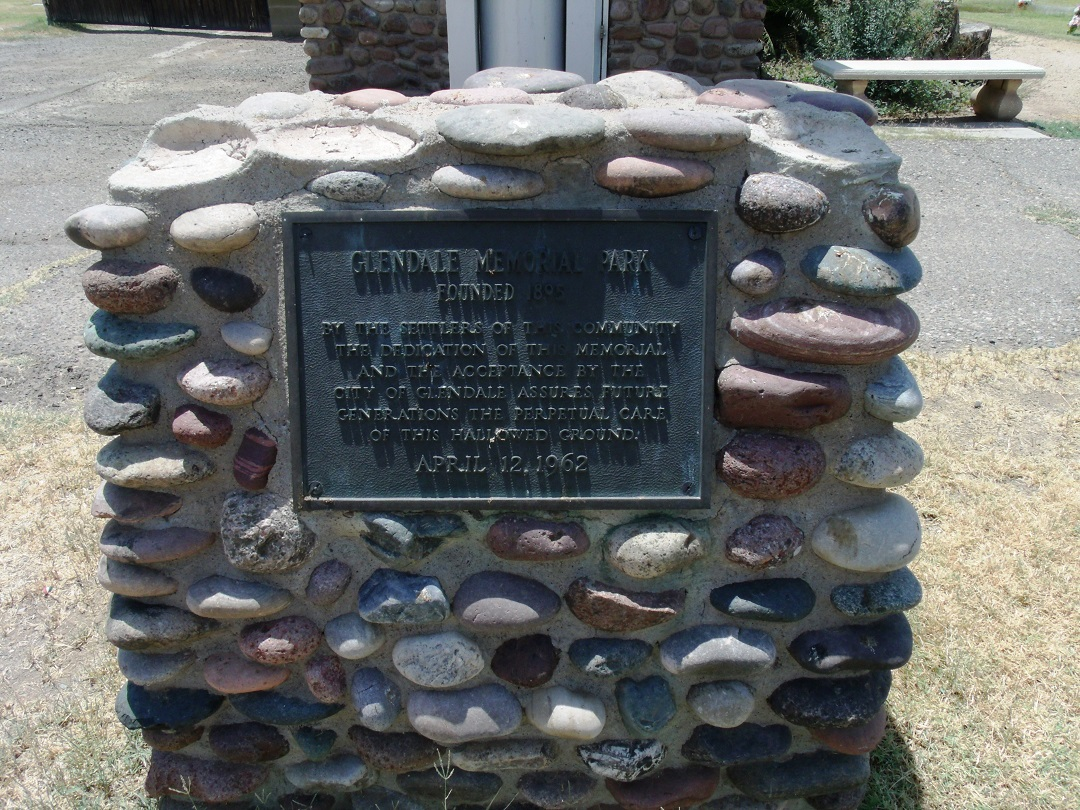
Historical 1895 marker

The Glendale Memorial Park Cemetery is a historic cemetery located at 7844 North 61st Ave. in Glendale, Arizona. The cemetery was originally called Glendale Memorial Park. It is the final resting place of various notable early citizens of Glendale. Among those who are interred in the cemetery are early pioneers, mayors, businessman and veterans who fought in every military conflict in which the United States has been involved starting from the American Civil War onward. Also, in the cemetery there is a memorial and 16 graves of immigrant farmers who perished in 1959 in a bus accident on Central Ave.

=== West Resthaven Park Cemetery ===
West Resthaven Park Cemetery And Funeral Home was founded in 1947 and is located at 6450 West Northern Avenue. Among the notable people which are interred are the founders of the City of Surprise and the founder of Wittmann. Also interred is a Medal of Honor recipient.

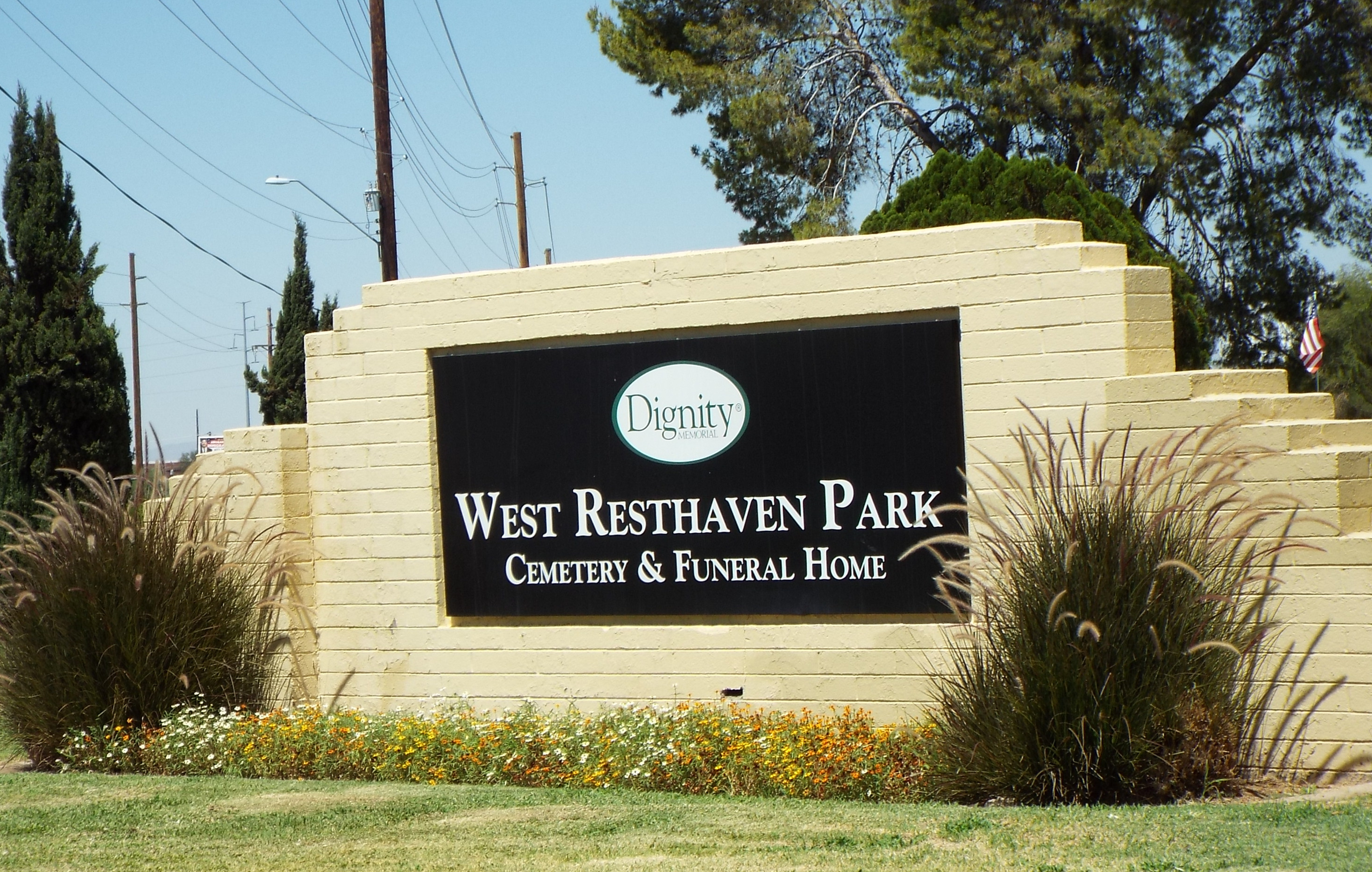
West Resthaven Park Cemetery

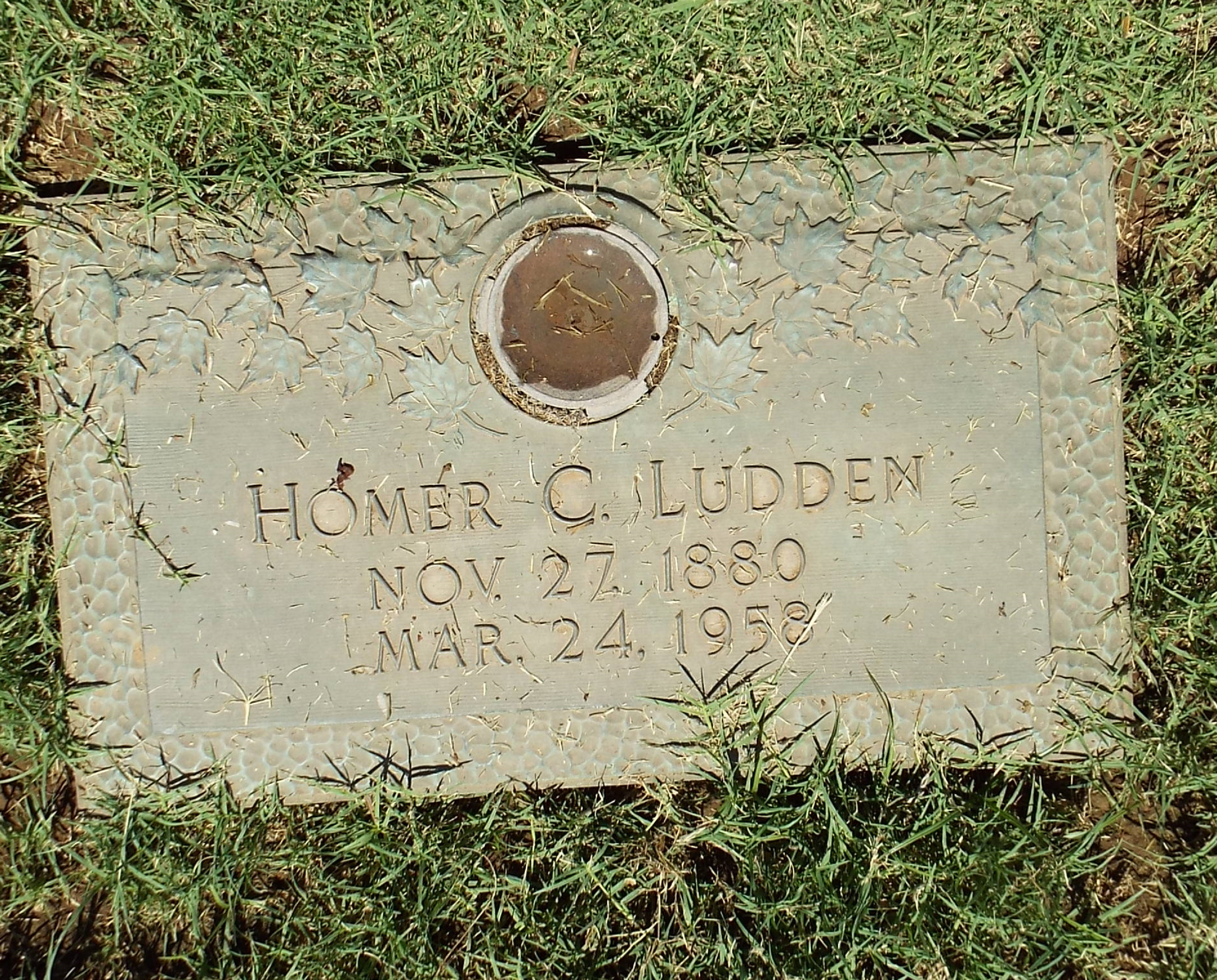
Grave of Homer C. Ludden (1880–1958) Arizona State Legislator and Founder of the City of Surprise, Arizona.

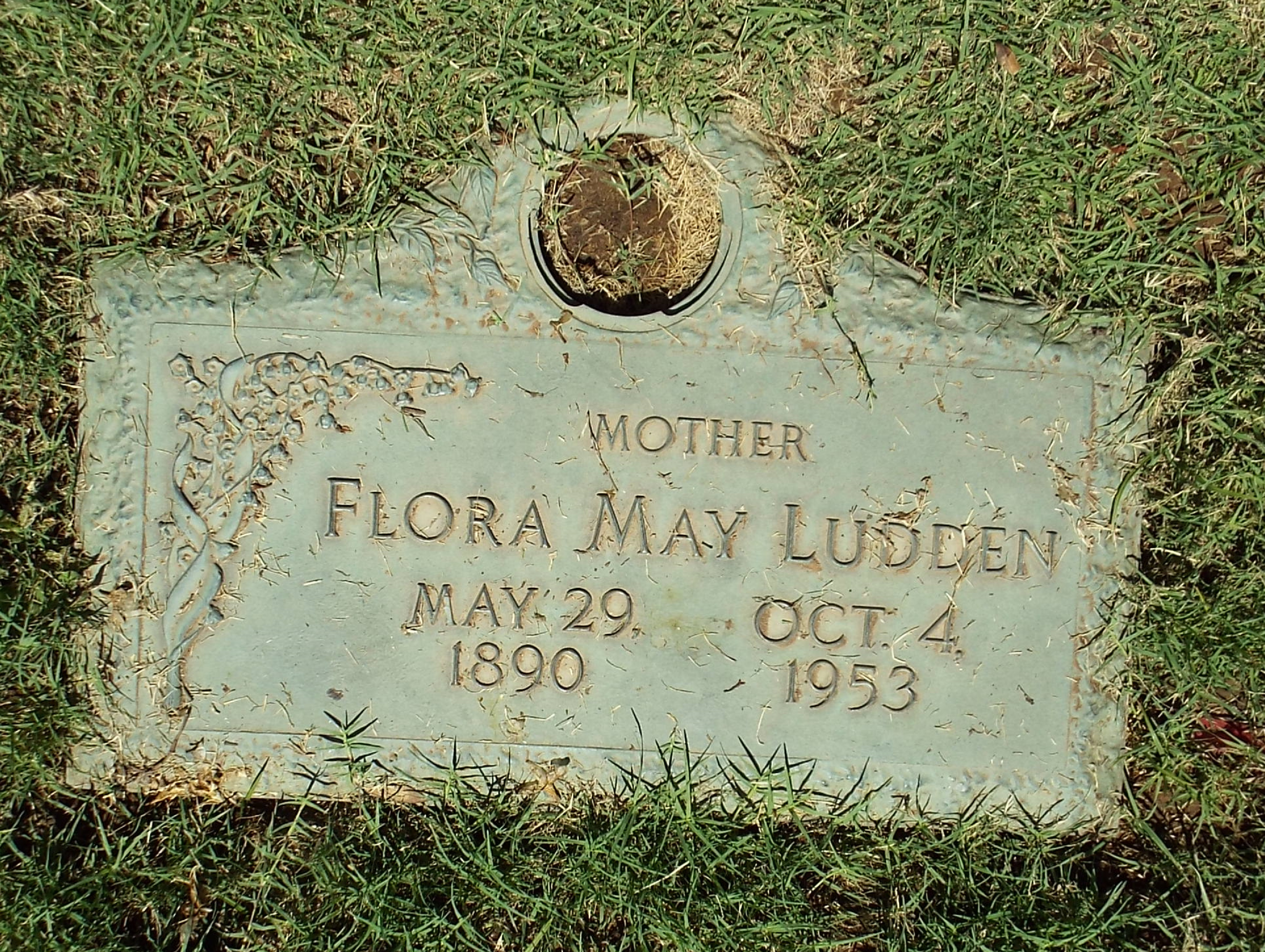
Grave of Flora May Gillett Ludden (1890–1953) Co-founder of the city of Surprise, Arizona.

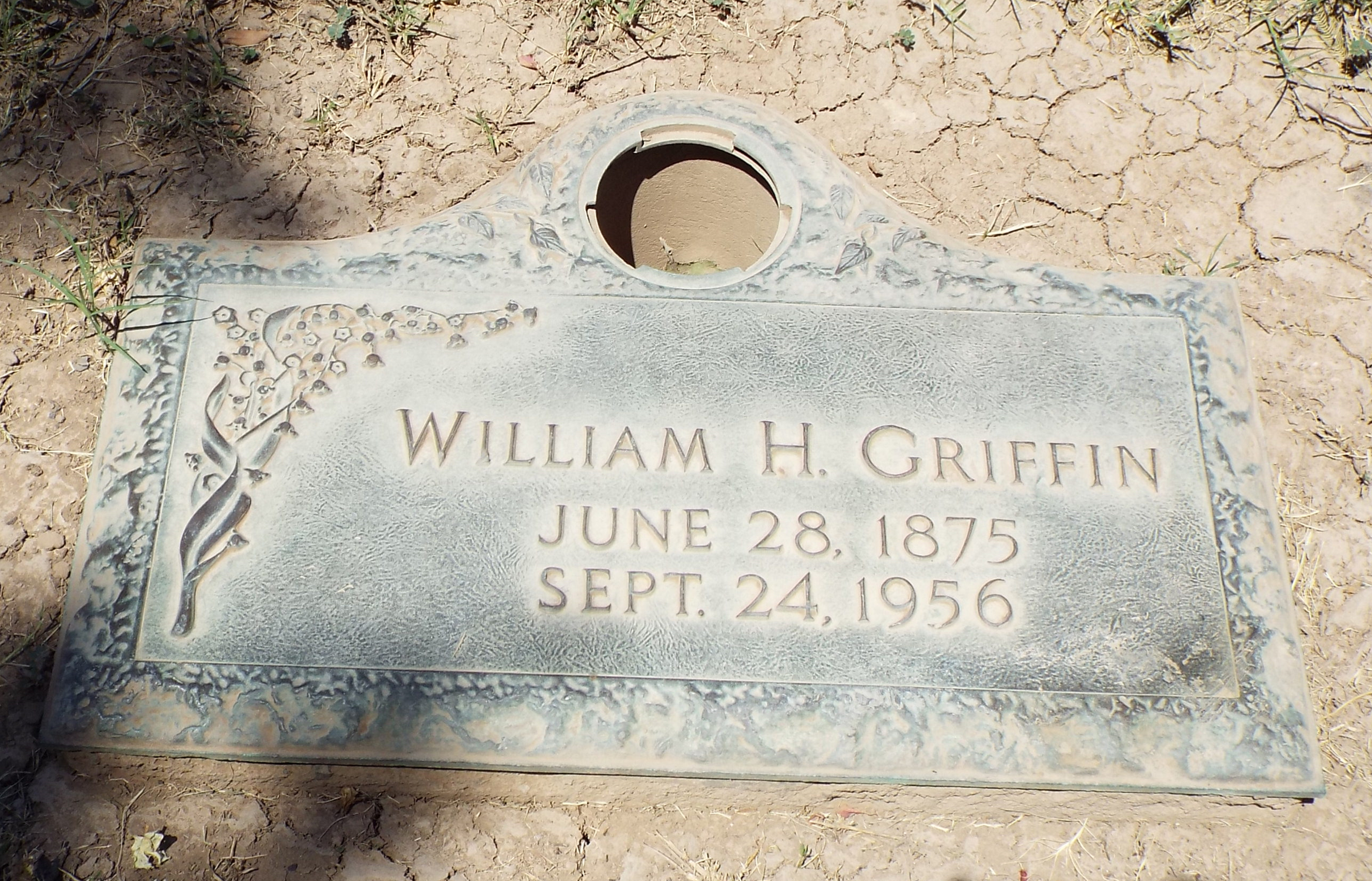
Grave of William Hovey Griffin (1875–1956) founder of the town of Nadaburg (Wittmann, Arizona).

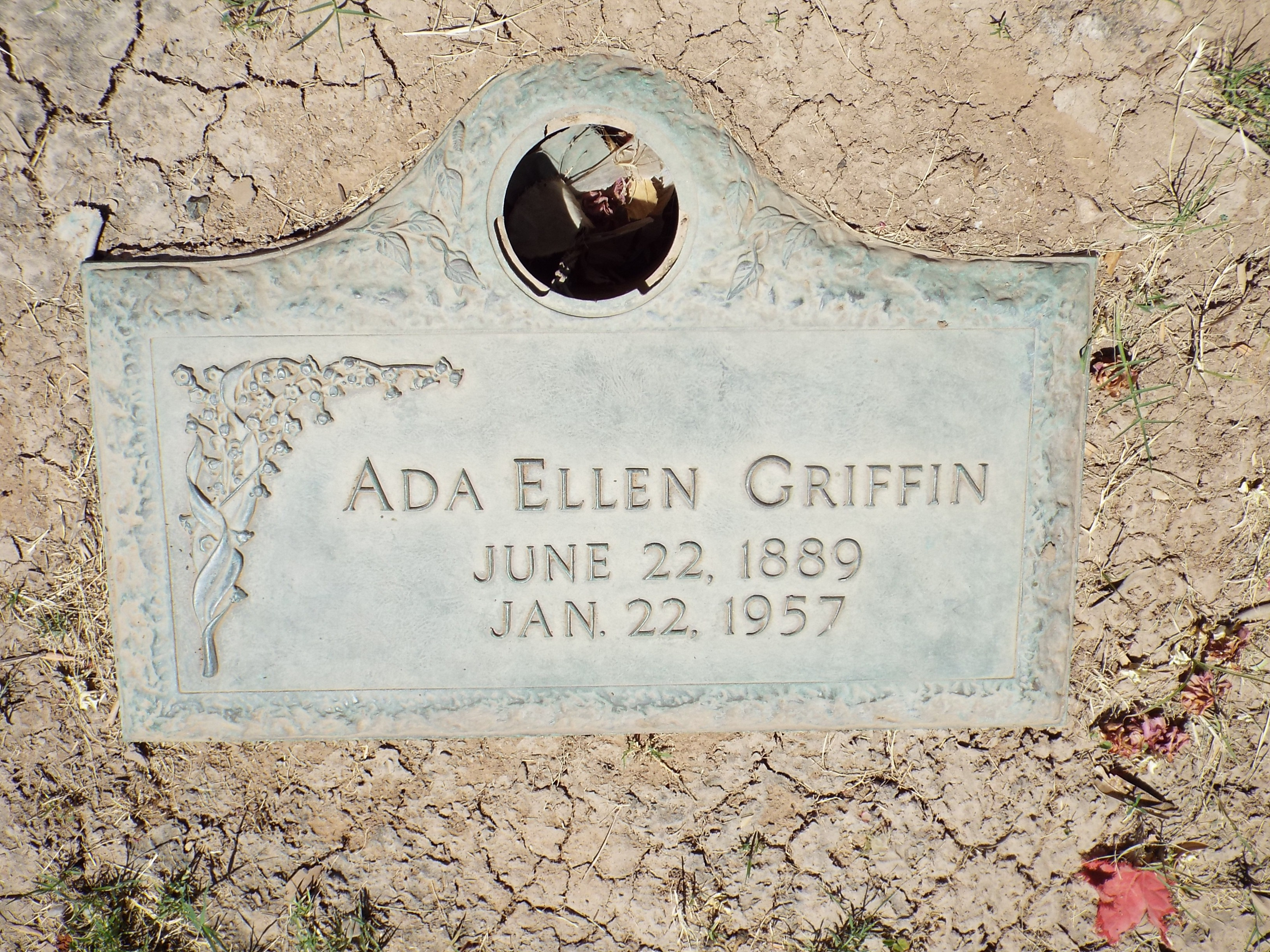
Grave of Ada Ellen Griffin (1889 – 1957) wife of William Hovey Griffin.

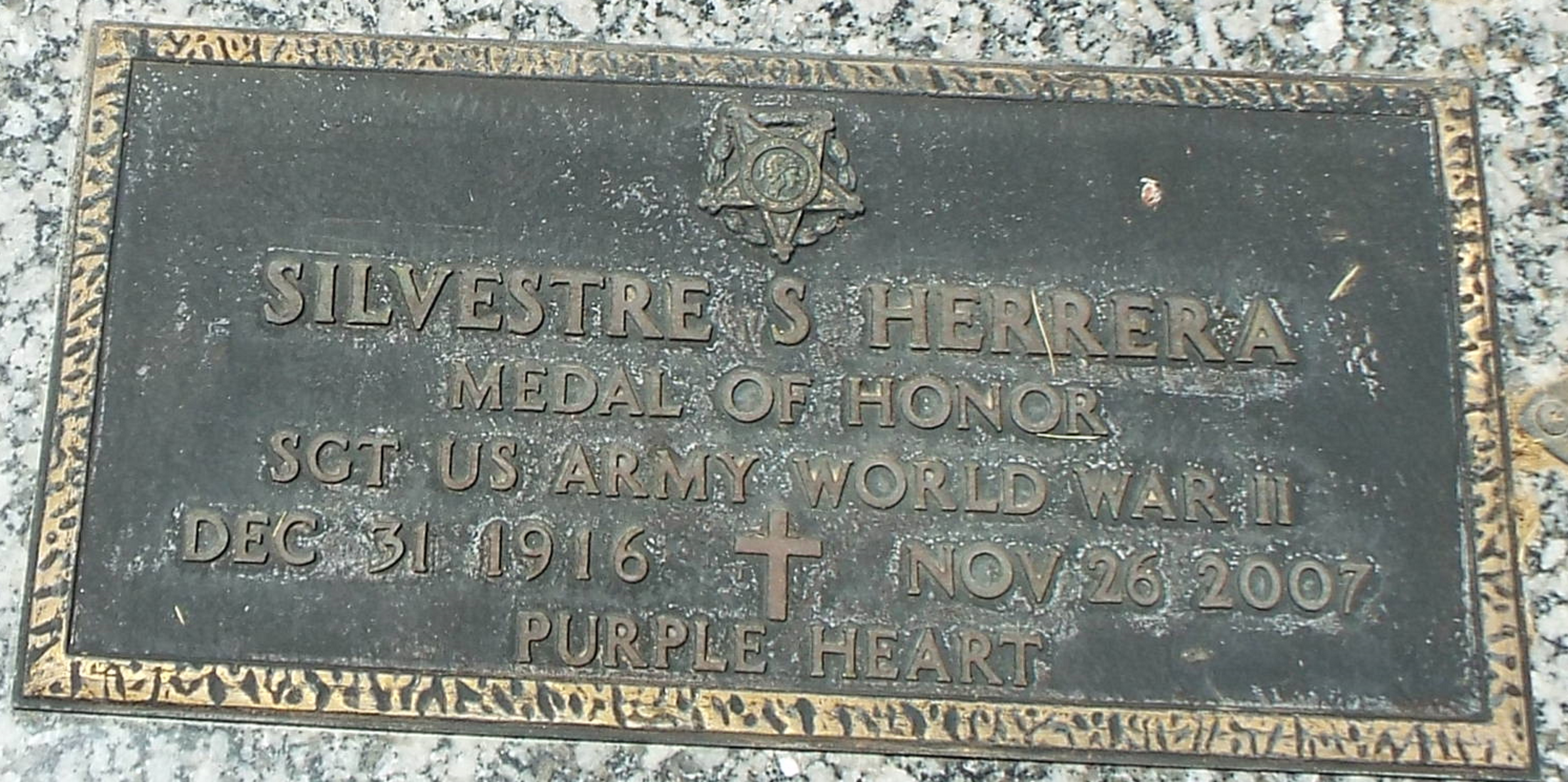
Grave-site of Silvestre S. Herrera located in West Resthaven Park Cemetery, Section 26; Block 16; Lot 1. Hererra was awarded the Medal of Honor in World War II.

== Historic interest ==
The following is a brief description with images of items which are of historical significance to the City of Glendale.

- The grave-site of William John Murphy, founder of Glendale.
- Murphy Park named after William John Murphy the founder of Glendale. The town clock (pictured) was dedicated in 1987 to the memory of Thelma Renick Heatwole (1912–1991), who covered life in the Glendale community for more than 40 years as a newspaper reporter. The park is located at 58th & Glendale Avenues and has a public library.
- Glendale's Fire Bell. When Glendale established its first all Volunteer fire department in 1912, this bell alerted the volunteers, which was made up of the local business owners. The bell was originally located on the towns’ water tank behind the Sine Hardware store at 58th Drive. The bell is now located at Fire Station #151 in Glendale, where it serves as a reminder of that departments pioneer days.
- The 1917 Nash Fire Truck which was the first motorized fire truck of the Glendale Fire Department. It is Model #3017, Truck #98745. Its maximum speed is 16 mph and has a normal freight load capacity of 4000 lbs. The normal weight allowance is 1500 lbs. and the normal weight of the chassis is 3850 lbs. The truck was manufactured by the “Nash Motors Company” and is on exhibit at the Glendale Training Center located at 11330 W. Glendale Ave.
- A 1954 American La France-Foamite 700 Series (California Historical Vehicle 622S) located at 57th Ave. and Bell Road in Glendale, Az.
- A 1947 Plymouth Police Car which was restored and is used in special events. The car is on exhibit at the Glendale Training Center located at 11330 W. Glendale Ave.
- The Glendale Veteran's Memorial located at 5959 West Brown Street in Glendale, Arizona. The City of Glendale acquired historical artifacts that were salvaged from the USS Arizona and the USS Arizona Memorial in Pearl Harbor. The rusted metal pieces are from a portion of the potato locker in the ship's galley. The steel rings were cut from the USS Arizona Memorial flagpole. Legislation passed during the administrations of Presidents Dwight D Eisenhower and John F Kennedy designated the remains a national shrine. This is an image of an artifact or piece of a structure that is listed on the National Register of Historic Places in the United States of America. Its reference number is 66000994.
- A Porter 0-4-0 18" gauge locomotive that was once used as a copper mining locomotive. Built in Pittsburgh, Pennsylvania in 1887, this locomotive was operated by the Detroit Copper Company at their Morenci, Arizona mine. The locomotive is located in the Sahuaro Central Railroad Museum at 23280 N 43rd Ave.
- Japanese Internment Camp Houses from Leupp, Flagstaff. These houses were built in 1943 and are now located in the grounds of the Sahuaro Central Railroad Museum.
- The University of Phoenix Stadium in Glendale, where the 2017 NCAA Final Four was played in.
Historic interest
(GAHS=Glendale Arizona Historic Society-listed)
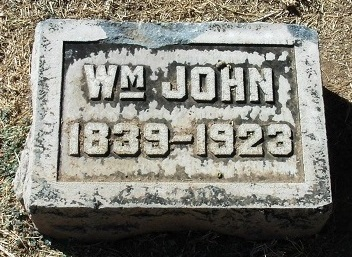
Grave-site of William John Murphy.

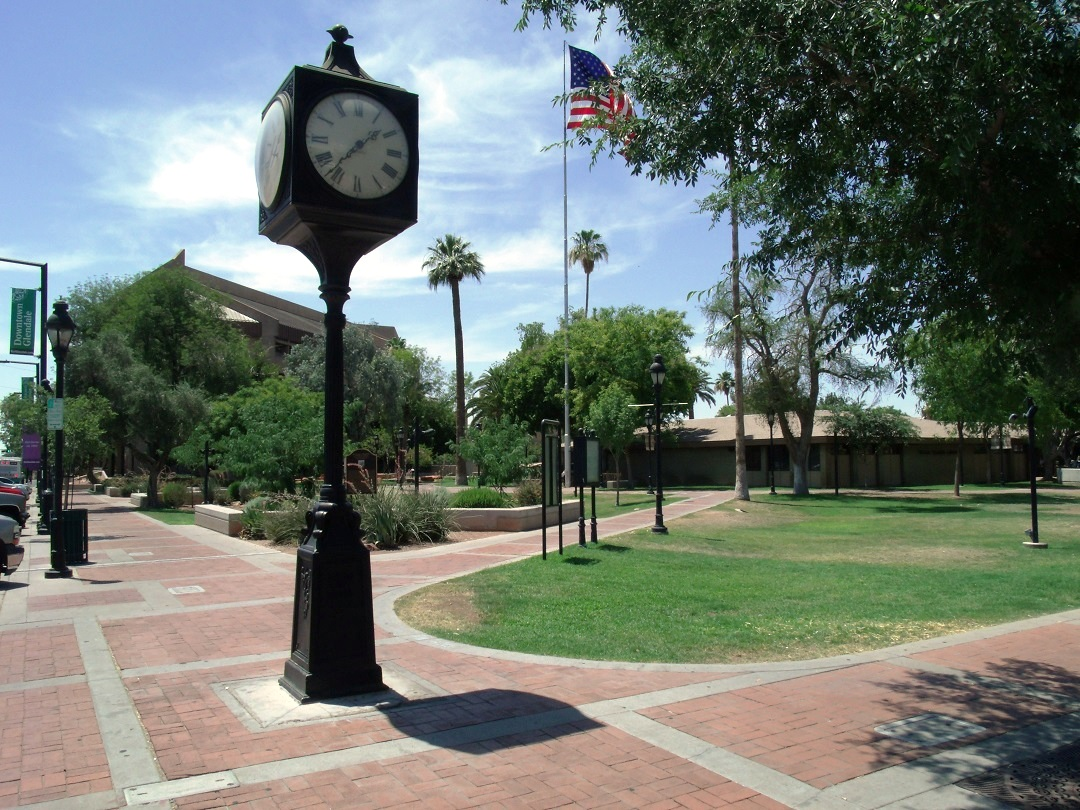
Murphy Park.

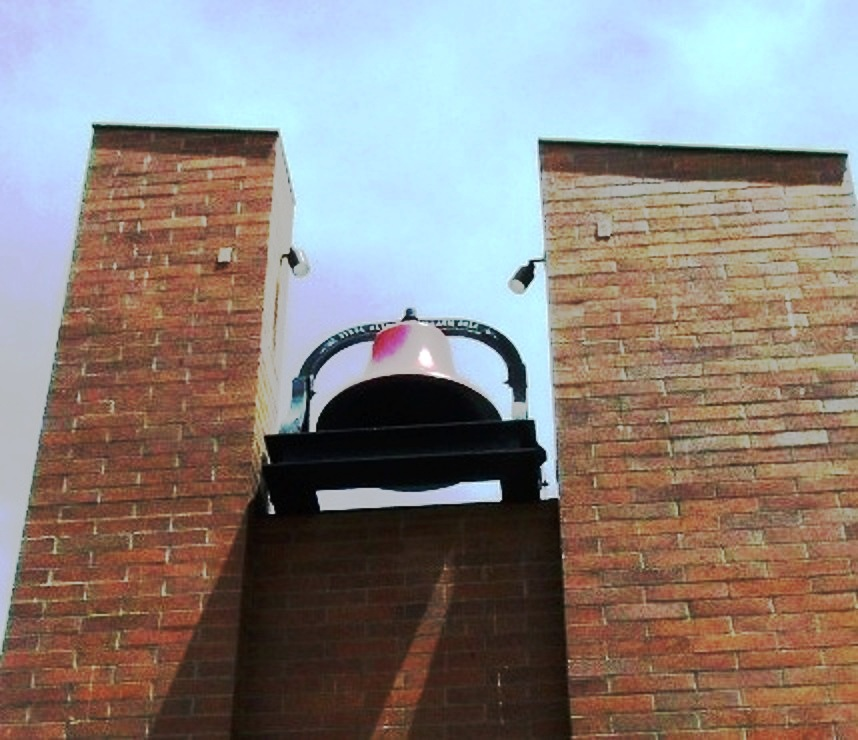
Glendale's Fire Bell.

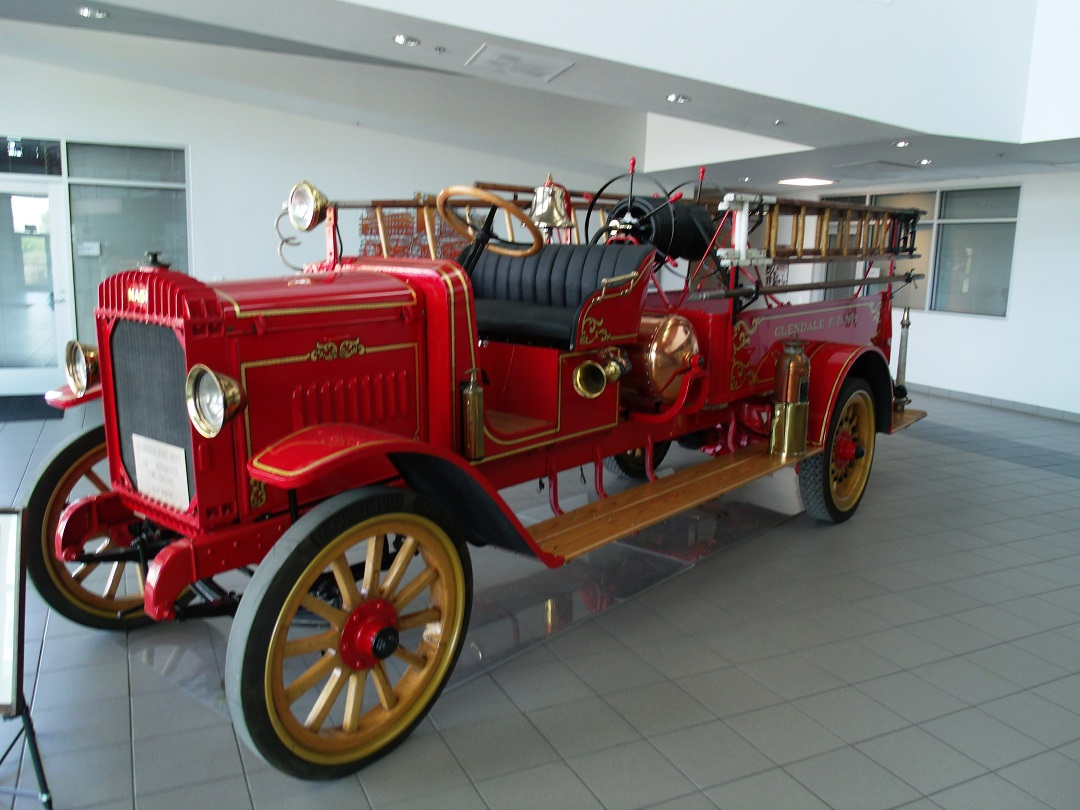
1917 Nash Fire Truck.

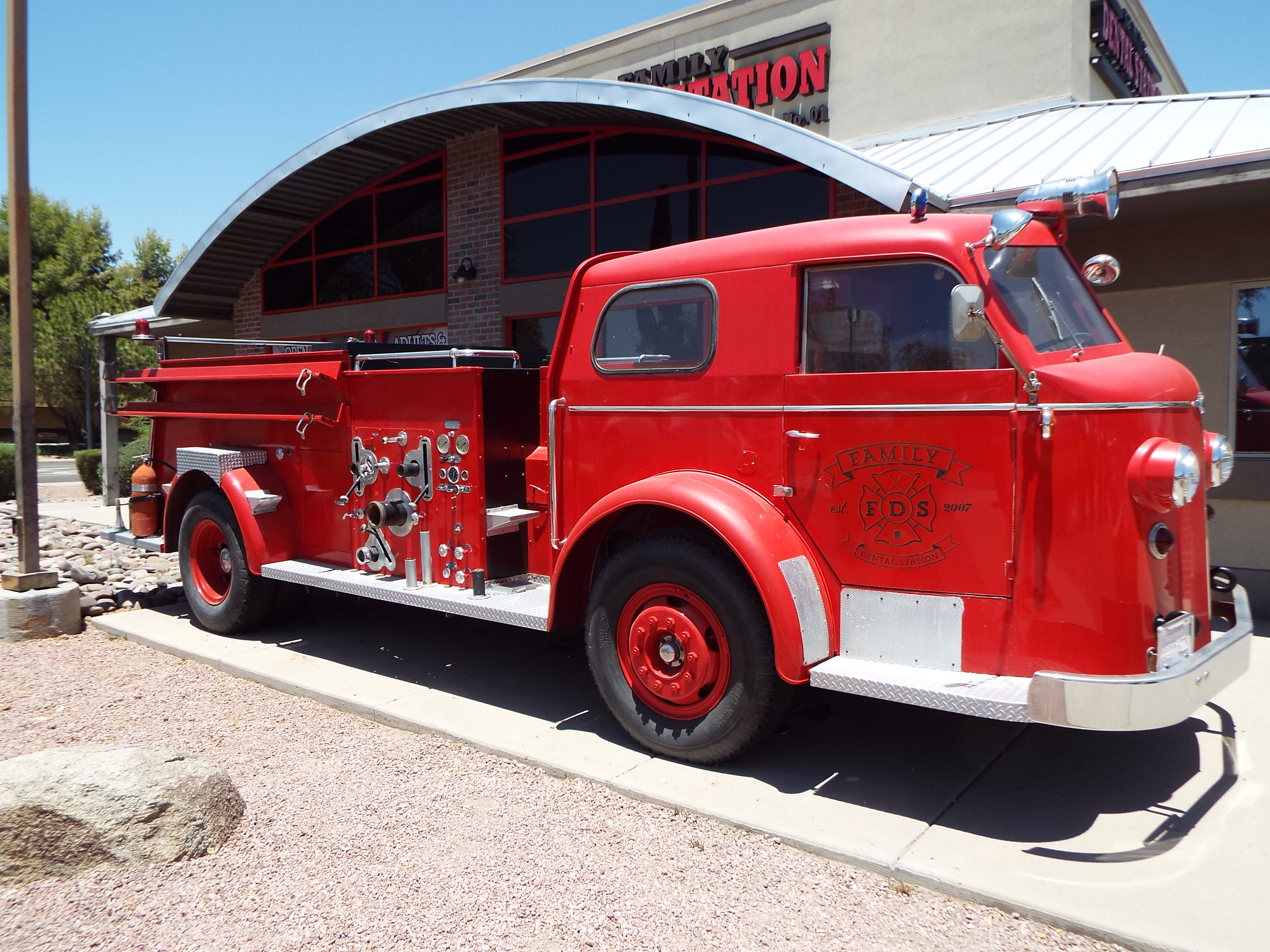
1954 American La France-Foamite 700 Series (California Historical Vehicle 622S).

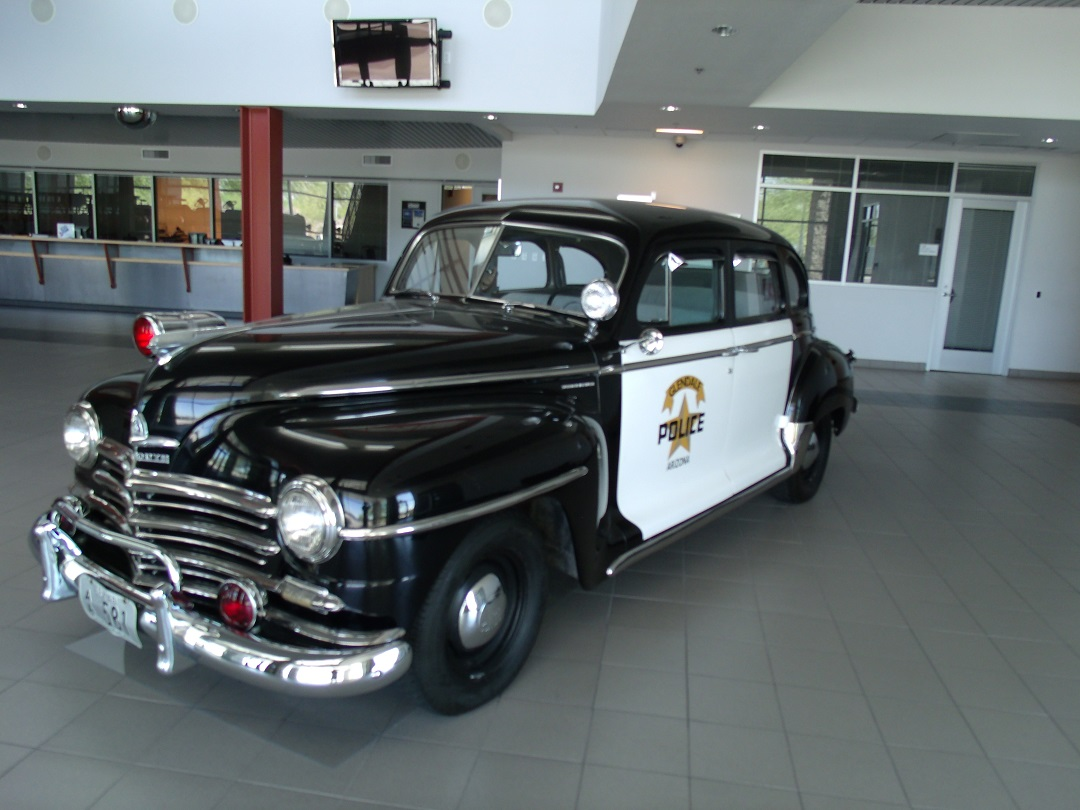
1947 Plymouth Police Car.

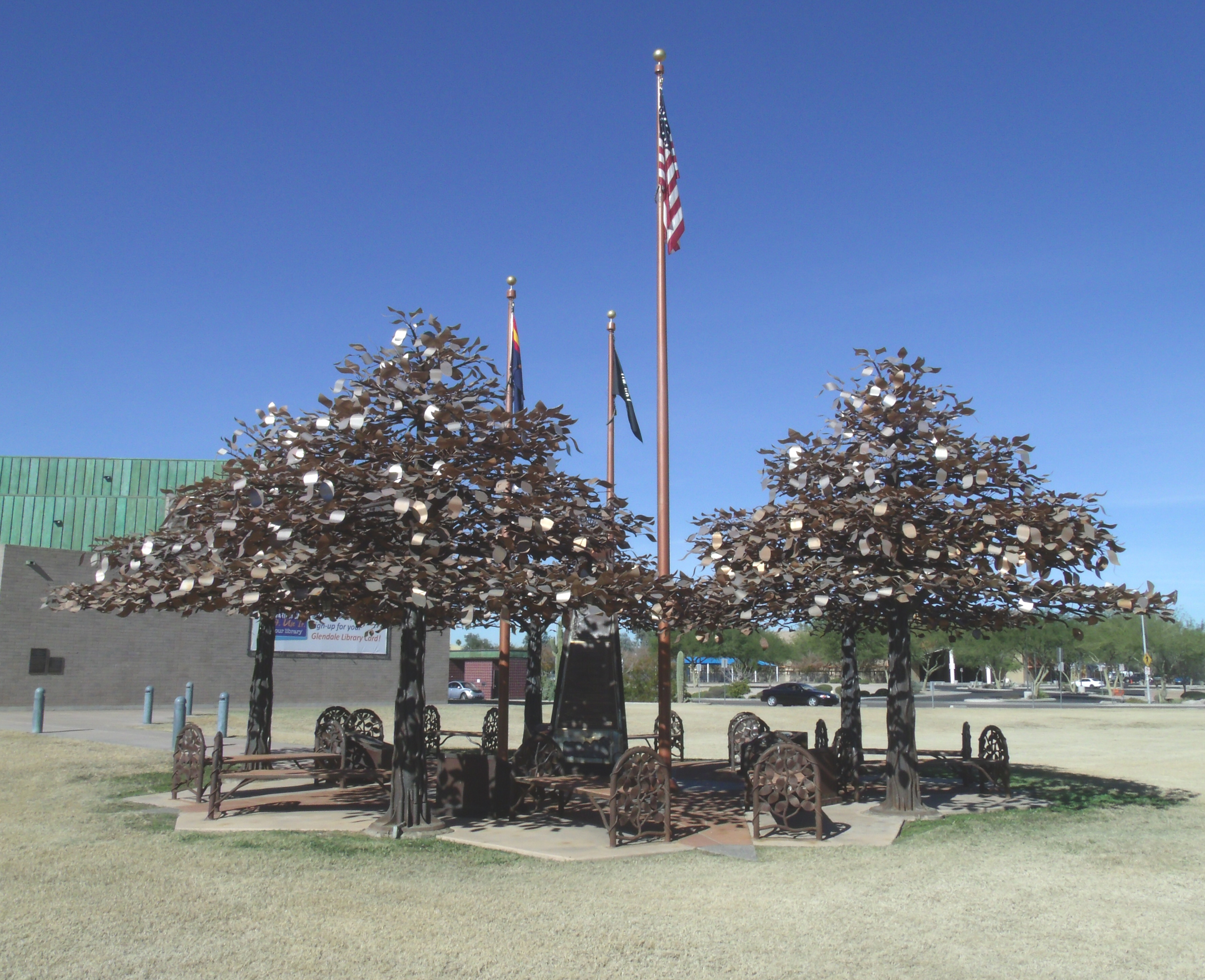
The Glendale Veteran's Memorial.

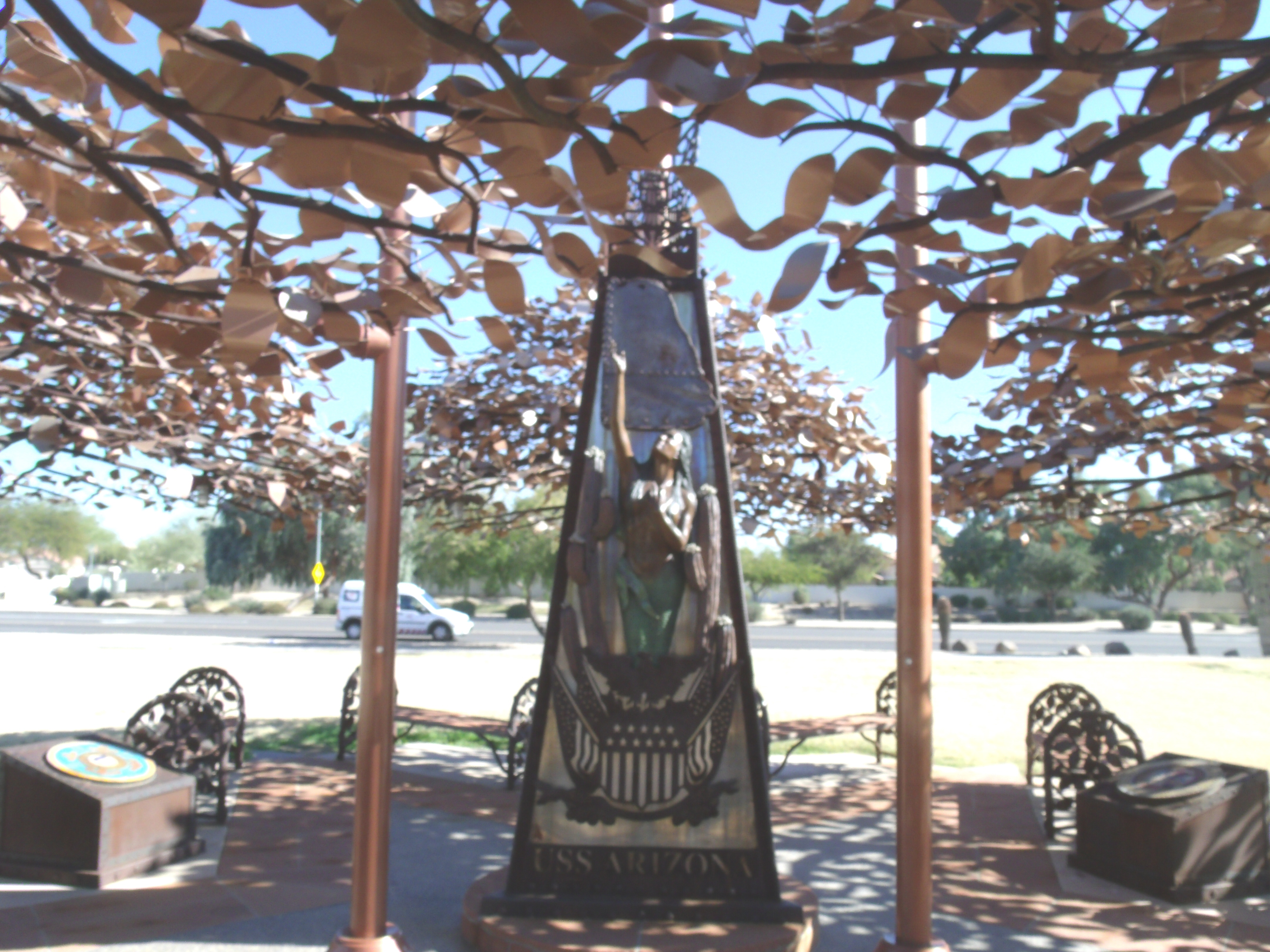
Another view of the Glendale Veteran's Memorial.

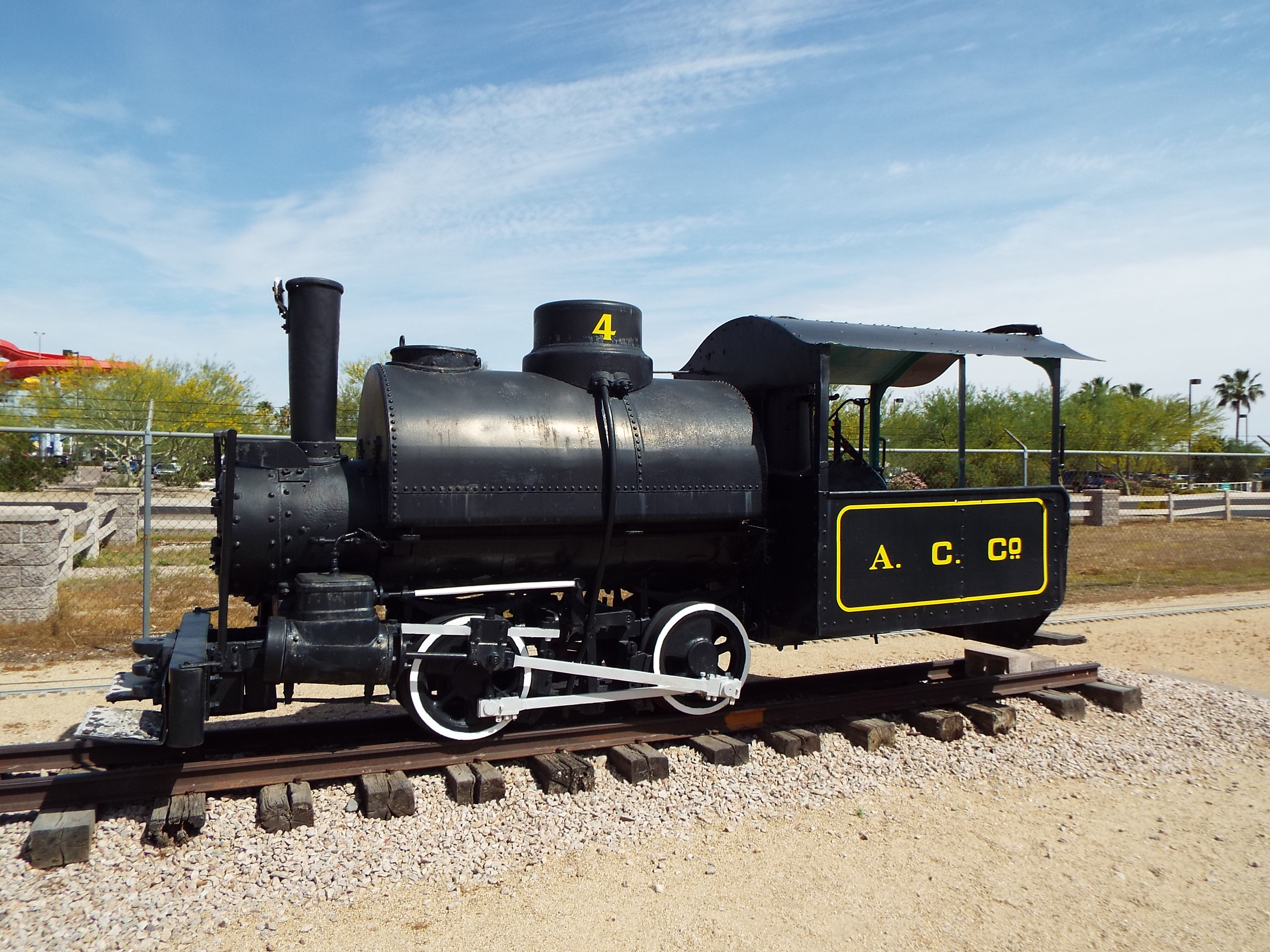
Porter 0-4-0.

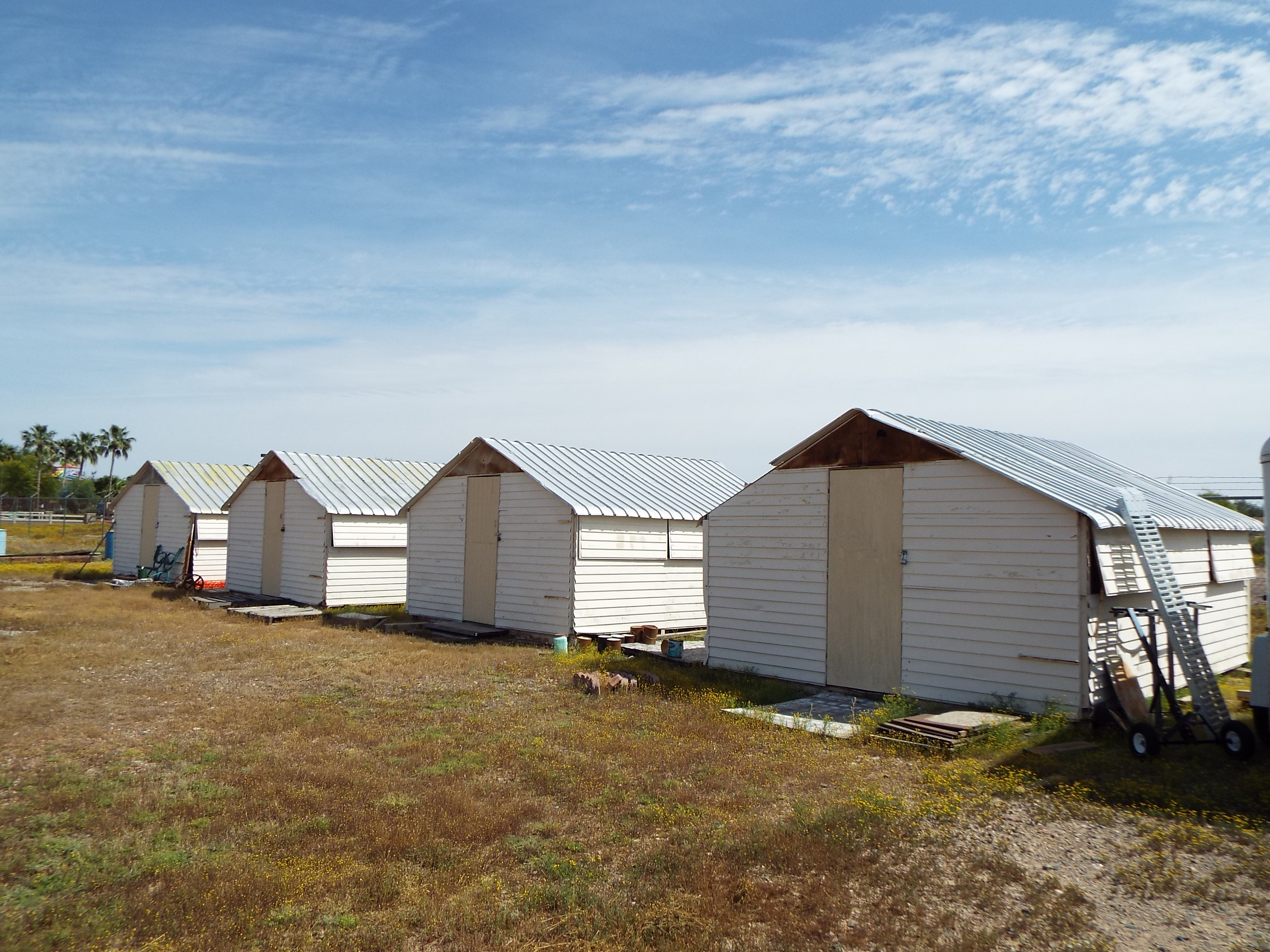
Japanese Internment Camp Houses.

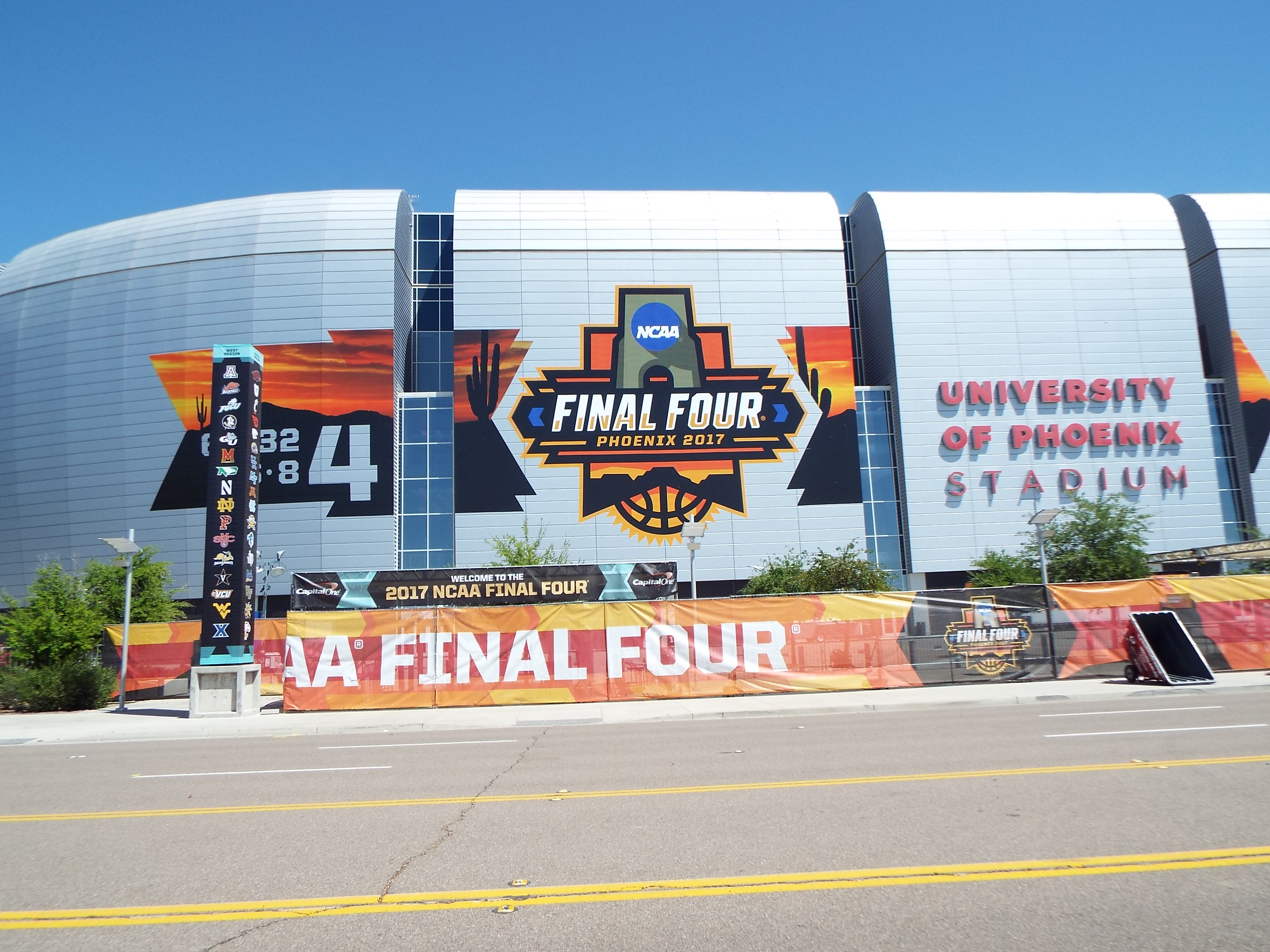
The University of Phoenix Stadium in Glendale.

== See also ==
- Adobe Mountain Desert Park
- Manistee Ranch
- Sahuaro Ranch
- USS Arizona salvaged artifacts
- List of National Historic Landmarks in Arizona
- National Register of Historic Places listings in Arizona
- National Register of Historic Places listings in Phoenix, Arizona
- National Register of Historic Places listings in Maricopa County, Arizona
