= List of Psi Upsilon members =

Psi Upsilon is a North American college fraternity. The following is a list of some of the notable members of Psi Upsilon.

== Academia ==
- Nathan Abbott (Dean of Stanford Law School)
- Charles Kendall Adams (President of University of Wisconsin–Madison, President of Cornell University)
- Herbert Baxter Adams (Professor at Johns Hopkins University)
- Charles Augustus Aiken (President of Union College, Professor at Princeton University)
- James Burrill Angell (President of the University of Michigan)
- Thomas Rutherford Bacon ( Congregational clergyman and professor of history at the University of California.)
- Nicholas Murray Butler (President of Columbia University)
- Clarence G. Child (Dean of the University of Pennsylvania graduate school)
- William S. Clark (President of University of Massachusetts Amherst)
- Rufus Cowles Crampton (President of Illinois College, Founder of Brown's Business College)
- Amos Noyes Currier (President of the University of Iowa)
- David Stuart Dodge (Professor at the Syrian Protestant College, Beirut)
- Hollis B. Frissell (President of Hampton University)
- Adam Gaiser (Professor of Religion at Florida State University)
- William Watson Goodwin (Eliot professor of Greek at Harvard University)
- Alfred Whitney Griswold – president of Yale University
- Daniel B. Hagar (Principal of the Canajoharie Academy, Norwich Academy, and Salem Normal School)
- Benjamin Francis Hayes (Professor at Bates College)
- Charles Rockwell Lanman (scholar of the Sanskrit language)
- George W. Kirchwey (Dean of Columbia Law School)
- Ralza M. Manly (Founder of the Richmond Colored Normal School)
- Edward Duffield Neill (President of Macalester College)
- William Alfred Packard (classical scholar)
- Charles Payne (President of Ohio Wesleyan University)
- James Mills Peirce (Professor at Harvard University)
- Albert Perkins (Principal of Phillips Exeter Academy)
- Rob Reich (political scientist)
- William James Rolfe (educator and Shakespearean scholar)
- James Grafton Rogers (Dean of the University of Colorado Law School, Assistant Secretary of State)
- Richard S. Rust (Founder of the Freedmen's Aid Society)
- John Theodore Saxe (professor at the Albany Academy)
- David Paige Smith (Professor at Yale Medical School)
- Goldwin Smith (Professor at Cornell University
- William Graham Sumner (Professor at Yale University)
- Horace Dutton Taft (Founder of the Taft School)
- James Kingsley Thacher (professor of medicine)
- Sherman Day Thacher (Founder and first headmaster of The Thacher School)
- William Seymour Tyler (Professor at Amherst College, original trustee of Smith College)
- James Lyman Whitney (co-founding organizer of the Library Association)
- John Henry Wright (Dean of the Harvard Graduate School of Arts and Sciences)

== Arts and architecture ==
- Dana Bourgeois (Luthier, writer, lecturer, acoustic guitar maker)
- Bradshaw Crandell (artist and illustrator)
- John Taylor Johnston (President of the Metropolitan Museum of Art)
- Shyam Telikicherla (Architectural designer, engineer, artist and musician)
- Henry Van Brunt (architect and architectural writer)

== Business ==
- Robert Orville Anderson (Founder of the Atlantic Richfield Company)
- William H. T. Bush (Businessman, member of the Bush Family)
- John Cleghorn (Chairman of the Royal Bank of Canada)
- Peter Coors (Founder and CEO of Coors Brewing Company, owner of Colorado Rockies)
- Tony Fadell (Inventor of the iPod, co-inventor of the iPhone)
- William Clay Ford Sr. (VP of Ford Motor Company, owner of Detroit Lions)
- Charles William Harkness (Director at Standard Oil)
- Stephen Mandel (Founder of Lone Pine Capital)
- John Jay Phelps (Railroad Baron)
- Mark Smucker (President & CEO of The J.M. Smucker Company)
- Alexander Henry Stevens (banker)
- John Textor (Executive Chairman of fuboTV; Owner of Premier League Crystal Palace Football Club)
- Cornelius Vanderbilt III (Member of the Vanderbilt family)
- Levi C. Wade (President of the Mexican Central Railway)
- Thomas J. Watson (chairman and CEO of IBM)

== Entertainment ==
- Richard Barthelmess (Actor)
- Michael Bay (Film director known for big-budget action films)
- Bud Collyer (radio actor, announcer, and game show host)
- Greg Giraldo (Stand-up comedian, television personality, and lawyer)
- J. Cheever Goodwin (musical theatre librettist, lyricist and producer)
- Stacy Keach (Actor)
- Frank Tuttle (Hollywood film director and writer)
- Tommy Vietor (Commentator and podcaster)
- Herve D. Wilkins (organist and composer)
- Danny Zuker (television writer and producer)

== Law ==
=== Attorney ===
- Francis N. Bangs (Founder of Davis Polk)
- James William Beekman Jr. (lawyer, President of the Saint Nicholas Society of the City of New York)
- William Allen Butler (President of the Bar Association)
- Frederic René Coudert Sr. (lawyer with Coudert Brothers)
- Roger Sherman Baldwin Foster (Lawyer)
- Reuben T. Durrett (lawyer, Founder Louisville Free Public Library, Main organizer of The Filson Historical Society)
- Charles Hadley Hamilton (City Attorney of Milwaukee)
- Burton Harrison (lawyer Private secretary to Confederate States of America president Jefferson Davis)
- Lewis Cass Ledyard (President of the New York City Bar Association)
- Robert Treat Paine (Lawyer and Philanthropist)
- John Godfrey Saxe II (President of the New York State Bar Association)
- William Andrew Sutherland (Lawyer)
- Thomas Thacher (lawyer)
- Henry Waters Taft (Name Partner at Cadwalader, Wickersham & Taft)
- Albion W. Tourgée (Lead Attorney in Plessy v. Ferguson, founder of Bennett College)

=== Attorney general ===
- Amos T. Akerman (United States Attorney General)
- Beau Biden (Attorney General of Delaware)
- Dwight Foster (Massachusetts Attorney General)
- Alfred S. Hartwell (Attorney General of Hawaii)
- Charles Phelps (Connecticut Attorney General)
- George Washington Woodruff (Attorney General of Pennsylvania, Member of the College Football Hall of Fame)

=== Judges ===
- Elmer B. Adams (United States circuit judge of the United States Court of Appeals for the Eighth Circuit)
- Isaac Atwater (Justice of the Minnesota Supreme Court)
- Darius Baker (Justice of the Rhode Island Supreme Court)
- Wilbur F. Booth (Senior Judge of the United States Court of Appeals for the Eighth Circuit)
- Horace R. Buck (Justice of the Montana Supreme Court)
- Lewis W. Clark (Chief Justice of the New Hampshire Supreme Court, Attorney General of New Hampshire)
- Isaac Clinton Collins (Judge of the Ohio Courts of Common Pleas)
- Norman Staunton Dike (New York Supreme Court Judge)
- Lucilius A. Emery (Chief Justice of the Maine Supreme Judicial Court, Maine Attorney General)
- Samuel Dorr Faulkner (County judge and surrogate of Livingston County, New York)
- Francis Miles Finch (Judge of the New York Court of Appeals)
- John Clinton Gray (Judge of the New York Court of Appeals)
- Howard Clark Hollister (United States district judge of the United States District Court for the Southern District of Ohio)
- Rensselaer Nelson (Judge of the United States District Court for the District of Minnesota)
- Benjamin K. Phelps (New York County District Attorney)
- Joseph Lewis Stackpole (Member of the Board of General Appraisers)
- John Paul Stevens (Supreme Court justice)
- William Kneeland Townsend (Judge of the United States Court of Appeals for the Second Circuit)
- Leonard Eugene Wales (United States district judge of the United States District Court for the District of Delaware)
- Andrew P. Wiswell (Justice of the Maine Supreme Judicial Court)
- Daniel Thew Wright Sr. (Member of the Ohio Supreme Court Commission)

== Literature and journalism ==
- Horatio Alger (Author)
- John Eliot Bowen (Author)
- Hjalmar Hjorth Boyesen (Norwegian-author and college professor)
- Dan Brown (Author of The Da Vinci Code and other notable works)
- Henry Armitt Brown (author and orator)
- Harlan Coben (Author of Myron Bolitar series and other notable works)
- Maunsell Bradhurst Field (poet, diplomat, judge, and author)
- Gilbert Grosvenor (First full-time editor of National Geographic magazine)
- Joseph Converse Heywood (poet)
- Frederic Lawrence Knowles (poet)
- Archibald MacLeish (U.S. Poet Laureate, Three-time Pulitzer Prize recipient, Under-Secretary of State)
- Jason Pinter (Author)
- George P. Putnam (publisher, writer and explorer, Husband of Amelia Earhart)
- Samuel Porter Putnam (journalist, freethinker, critic and publicist)
- Frank Dempster Sherman (poet and academic)
- Louis Judson Swinburne (Author)
- Charles Rumford Walker (Historian, Political Scientist, and Novelist)
- Charles Dudley Warner (Co-author of The Gilded Age: A Tale of Today)
- Edwin Percy Whipple (essayist and critic)
- Robert William Wright (lnewspaper editor, and author)

== Military ==
- Nicholas Longworth Anderson (Colonel of the 6th Ohio Infantry Regiment in the Civil War)
- James Chaplin Beecher (Congregationalist minister and Colonel for the Union Army during the Civil War)
- Charles C. Dodge (Union brigadier general in the Civil War)
- Richard Foster (abolitionist and Union Army officer)
- Charles Henry Howard (Officer in the Union Army during the Civil War)
- Joseph C. Jackson (Union brevet brigadier general in the Civil War)
- Sumner Increase Kimball (General Superintendent of the United States Life-Saving Service)
- Thomas Jefferson Morgan (Commissioner of Indian Affairs, Brevet Brigadier General during the Civil War)
- Reuben D. Mussey Jr. (Union Army colonel during the Civil War)
- Francis Winthrop Palfrey (historian and Civil War officer)
- Isaac Ferdinand Quinby (Union general during the Civil War)
- Edward H. Ripley (Union Army officer in the Civil War)
- George Crockett Strong (Union brigadier general in the Civil War)
- Wheelock G. Veazey (Commander-in-Chief of the Grand Army of the Republic)
- J. Fred. Waring (Senior officer of the Confederate States Army)
- William Collins Whitney (United States Secretary of the Navy)

== Politics ==
=== Presidents and prime ministers ===
- Chester A. Arthur (President of the United States)
- Paul Martin (Prime Minister of Canada)
- Nelson Rockefeller (Vice President of the United States)
- William Howard Taft (President of the United States)

=== Cabinet members ===
- William Cohen (United States Secretary of Defense)
- Porter Goss (Director of the Central Intelligence Agency)
- William Moulton Ingraham (United States Assistant Secretary of War, Mayor of Portland, Maine)
- John Kerry (United States Secretary of State, United States Senator from Massachusetts, 2004 Democratic Nominee for President of the United States)
- Robert Lansing (United States Secretary of State)
- George B. Loring (United States Secretary of Agriculture)
- Franklin MacVeagh (United States Secretary of the Treasury)
- John Negroponte (United States Deputy Secretary of State, Director of National Intelligence, United States Ambassador to the United Nations)
- William Cary Sanger (United States Assistant Secretary of War)
- Frederick W. Seward (United States Assistant Secretary of State)
- Henry L. Stimson (United States Secretary of State)
- William H. Webster (Chair of the Homeland Security Advisory Council)
- Hugh R. Wilson (United States Assistant Secretary of State, United States Ambassador to Germany)

=== Diplomacy ===
- Herbert Wolcott Bowen (U.S. Ambassador to Venezuela)
- John Safford Fiske (Consul of the United States at Leith, Scotland)
- Eugene Schuyler (U.S. Consul General to Egypt, U.S. Minister to Greece, U.S. Minister to Serbia, and U.S. Consul General to Romania

=== Senators ===
- Samuel G. Arnold (United States Senator from Rhode Island)
- John Christopher Burch (Secretary of the United States Senate)
- LeBaron Bradford Colt (United States Senator from Rhode Island)
- Chauncey Depew (United States Senator from New York)
- Orris S. Ferry (United States Senator from Connecticut)
- William P. Frye (United States Senator from Maine)
- Joseph Roswell Hawley (United States Senator from Connecticut, Governor of Connecticut)
- Anthony Higgins (United States Senator from Delaware)
- Alfred B. Kittredge (United States Senator from South Dakota)
- Henry F. Lippitt (United States Senator from Rhode Island)
- Francis G. Newlands (United States Senator from Nevada)
- James W. Patterson (United States Senator from New Hampshire)
- John Sewell Sanborn (Senator for Wellington, Quebec)
- John Coit Spooner (United States Senator from Wisconsin)
- Robert A. Taft (United States Senator from Ohio)
- George P. Wetmore (United States Senator from Rhode Island, Governor of Rhode Island)

=== House of Representatives ===
- William S. Barry (United States Representative from Mississippi)
- Curtis Coe Bean (United States Representative from Arizona)
- Benjamin T. Eames (United States Representative from Rhode Island)
- Constantine C. Esty (United States Representative from Massachusetts)
- Walbridge A. Field (United States Representative from Massachusetts)
- Tom Kean Jr. (United States Representative from New Jersey and former State Senator)
- William Henry Fitzhugh Lee (United States Representative from Virginia)
- Theodore Lyman III (United States Representative from Massachusetts)
- Jonas H. McGowan (United States Representative from Indiana)
- Edward Tylor Miller (United States Representative from Maryland)
- John U. Pettit (United States Representative from Indiana)
- William Walter Phelps (United States Representative from New Jersey)
- James Pike (United States Representative from New Hampshire)
- Clarkson Nott Potter (United States Representative from New York)
- William W. Rice (United States Representative from Massachusetts)
- William Erigena Robinson (United States Representative from New York)
- Julius Hawley Seelye (United States Representative from Massachusetts, President of Amherst College)
- Eli Thayer (United States Representative from Massachusetts)
- James Wakefield (United States Representative from Minnesota, Lieutenant Governor of Minnesota)

=== Governors ===
- Charles B. Andrews (Governor of Connecticut)
- Simeon E. Baldwin (Governor of Connecticut)
- Charles H. Bell (Governor of New Hampshire, United States Senator from New Hampshire)
- Daniel Henry Chamberlain (Governor of South Carolina)
- Walter F. Frear (Territorial Governor of Hawaii)
- W. Averell Harriman (Under-Secretary of State, Secretary of Commerce, Governor of New York)
- Francis Burton Harrison (Governor-General of the Philippines, member of the U.S. House of Representatives from New York)
- George Edwin King (Premier of New Brunswick, Puisne Justice of the Supreme Court of Canada)
- Pendleton Murrah (Governor of Texas)
- Benjamin Odell (Governor of New York)
- Benjamin F. Prescott (Governor of New Hampshire)
- Henry B. Quinby (Governor of New Hampshire)
- Alexander H. Rice (Governor of Massachusetts, member of the U.S. House of Representatives from Massachusetts, Mayor of Boston)
- Henry Roberts (Governor of Connecticut)

=== State and local office holders ===
- Edward Towle Brooks (Member of the Canadian Parliament for Town of Sherbrooke)
- Charles Greene Came (Member of the Maine House of Representatives)
- John Morton Eshleman (Lieutenant Governor of California)
- Oran Faville (Lieutenant Governor of Iowa)
- Willard Cutting Flagg (Member of the Illinois State Senate)
- Samuel Abbott Green (Mayor of Boston, Massachusetts)
- Freeman Clark Griswold (Member of the Massachusetts House of Representatives)
- William H. Haile (Lieutenant Governor of Massachusetts, Mayor of Springfield, Massachusetts)
- Edward Griffin Parker (Member of both houses of the Massachusetts Legislature)
- James Hammond Trumbull (Secretary of the State of Connecticut)
- Timothy L. Woodruff (Lieutenant Governor of New York)

=== Other politics ===
- Dean Conant Worcester (Philippine Secretary of the Interior)
- Kenneth R. Weinstein (Walter P. Stern Distinguished Fellow at Hudson Institute)

== Religion ==
- Maltbie Davenport Babcock (clergyman, author of This is My Father's World)
- Herman Norton Barnum (Christian missionary stationed in Kharpert)
- Benjamin Brewster (Episcopal Bishop of the Maine and Missionary Bishop of Western Colorado)
- Thomas Frederick Davies (Bishop of the Bishop of Michigan in the Episcopal Church)
- Andrew Flinn Dickson (minister and author)
- Henry Martyn Dexter (Congregational clergyman and author)
- Angus Dun (Bishop of the Episcopal Diocese of Washington)
- George Zabriskie Gray (Clergyman, educator and theologian of the Episcopal Church in the United States)
- Henry Hamilton Hadley (theologian)
- Charles Richmond Henderson (Baptist minister and sociologist)
- George Hendric Houghton (Protestant Episcopal clergyman)
- Henry Harris Jessup (Presbyterian missionary)
- Edwin Stevens Lines (Bishop of the Episcopal Diocese of Newark, New Jersey)
- Abram Newkirk Littlejohn (Bishop of the Episcopal Diocese of Long Island)
- Willard Francis Mallalieu (bishop of the Methodist Episcopal Church)
- Jacob Merrill Manning (Congregational clergyman)
- Theodore T. Munger (Congregational clergyman, theologian and writer)
- Isaac Lea Nicholson (Bishop of the Episcopal Diocese of Milwaukee)
- William Woodruff Niles (Bishop of the Episcopal Diocese of New Hampshire)
- Sidney Catlin Partridge (Bishop of Kyoto and Bishop of the Episcopal Diocese of West Missouri)
- William Stevens Perry (Bishop of the Episcopal Diocese of Iowa)
- Thomas Scott Preston (Roman Catholic Vicar-General of New York)
- B. T. Roberts (Methodist bishop)
- Henry Martyn Scudder (Missionary)
- Walter Ashbel Sellew (Bishop of the Free Methodist Church)
- George Franklin Seymour (Bishop of the Episcopal Diocese of Springfield)
- John Franklin Spalding (Bishop of Colorado)
- Augustus Hopkins Strong (Baptist minister and theologian)
- Henry Winter Syle (First deaf person to be ordained a priest in the Episcopal Church in the United States)
- James H. Van Buren (Bishop of the Episcopal Diocese of Puerto Rico)
- George Roe Van De Water (Episcopal priest)
- Erastus Wentworth (Methodist Episcopal minister, missionary to Fuzhou, China)

== Science ==
- Erwin Hinckley Barbour (geologist and paleontologist)
- William G. Binney (Malacologist)
- Hamilton Castner (industrial chemist)
- Daniel Cady Eaton (botanist)
- George Bird Grinnell (anthropologist, historian, naturalist, and writer)
- Henry Williamson Haynes (archaeologist)
- Henry Guernsey Hubbard (entomologist and horticulturist)
- Newton Spaulding Manross (scientist and engineer)
- Othniel Charles Marsh (professor of Paleontology, President of the National Academy of Sciences)
- Ken Ono (Mathematician)
- Thomas Burr Osborne (Biochemist, Discovered Vitamin A)
- Alpheus Spring Packard (entomologist and palaeontologist, founder of The Naturalist)
- John Addison Porter (professor of chemistry and physician, Namesake of the John Addison Porter Prize, Founder of the Scroll and Key senior society)
- Maurice Howe Richardson (surgeon)
- Ogden Rood (physicist)
- Henry Reed Stiles (physician)
- Dennis Tito (engineer, entrepreneur, and astronaut)
- Henry Shaler Williams (geologist)

== Sports ==
- Dick Barrett (Baseball player)
- Jay Berwanger (First Heisman Trophy winner)
- Chuck Carney (Football and basketball player)
- William Herbert Corbin (Football player)
- Thomas Bayne Denègre (Captain of the Yale rowing team)
- Jack Depler (Football player and coach)
- Fred Folsom (University of Colorado football coach, namesake of football stadium)
- William P. Graves (Head coach of North Carolina Tar Heels football)
- Louis K. Hull (Football player)
- Hank Ketcham (Inductee of the College Football Hall of Fame)
- Ed Marinaro (Actor and football player)
- Eugene Lamb Richards (Football player)
- Sam Schmidt (Former Indy Racing League driver and current NTT IndyCar Series and Indy Lights series team owner)
- Amos Alonzo Stagg (Pioneering college football coach)
- Ray Tompkins (Football player)
- Henry Twombly (Football player)
- Alexander Hamilton Wallis (Football player)
- John Wildhack (Athletic director at Syracuse University)
- Bud Wilkinson (Oklahoma Sooners football coach)
