= Manross =

Manross is a surname of Irish and Scottish Gaelic origin. Notable individuals with this surname include:

- Mary Manross, American politician
- Newton Spaulding Manross (1825–1862), American mining engineer
- Park Manross (1895–1951), member of the Canadian House of Commons
