= John Coleman (artist) =

American sculptor and painter

- Known for: Sculpture, Oil painting
- Notable work: Addih-Hiddisch, Hidatsa Chief; Visions of Change
- Movement: Art of the American Southwest
- Awards: Kieckhefer Award; James Earl Frazer Award
- Website: colemanstudios.com

John Coleman is an American sculptor and painter. His subject matter focuses on the American West, especially Native American historical and mythological figures of Southwestern United States. His works are held in the permanent collections of the Briscoe Western Art Museum, The James Western and Wildlife Museum, Desert Caballeros Western Museum, Joslyn Art Museum, Gilcrease Museum, National Cowboy & Western Heritage Museum, Phoenix Art Museum, Tucson Museum of Art, and Western Spirit: Scottsdale's Museum of the West.

== Early life and education ==
Coleman was born in 1949 in Southern California, and grew up in Manhattan Beach, California. He was the second child of three boys born to Mark and Jean Coleman. From a young age, he developed an interest in art, which was encouraged by his parents, especially his mother who used to take him to art stores during the family's trips to Laguna Beach. At the age of seventeen, he began working as an illustrator for a syndicated columnist and later at Butler Publications in California. However, Coleman never graduated from his California high school due to his learning difficulties caused by dyslexia. After marrying his high school girlfriend Sue Coleman, the couple moved to Parker, Arizona, where they had a business selling awnings for mobile homes.

== Career ==
Coleman eventually became a real estate developer in Arizona. In 1972, he and his wife moved to Prescott, Arizona. They purchased an 11-acre mobile home park, renovating it and acquiring the adjacent properties to develop several businesses including a storage facility, gas station, car wash and motel. The success of his business allowed him to dedicate his time to artistic pursuits.

Coleman began sculpting in his early forties and only became a full-time sculptor in 1994. He re-immersed himself in the art world and his newly awakened appreciation for sculpture by attending classes at the Scottsdale Artist School. In 1999, Coleman became a member of National Sculpture Society, and was later inducted as a fellow of the professional sculptors society. With encouragement from Ray Swanson, the former president of the Cowboy Artists of America (CAA), he applied to join and was inducted into the CAA in 2001. Coleman himself would later serve as president of the CAA in 2009.

Beginning in 2004, Coleman created a series of sculptures based on the works of Karl Bodmer and George Catlin, artists and explorers of the American West. His interest in Bodmer and Catlin began a decade prior as he was researching Native American attire and became fascinated by the two artists' unique works which are rare representations of Native Americans before the advent of the photograph. The first life-sized sculpture from this series, Addih-Hiddisch, Hidatsa Chief won the gold medal in sculpture and the Kieckhefer Award for Best of Show at CAA's Sale & Exhibition in 2004. The piece is currently held in the permanent collection of the Phoenix Art Museum and the Joslyn Art Museum Sculpture Garden. In 2012, Coleman created and donated a new piece named The Greeter, Black Moccasin Meeting Lewis & Clark to be installed at Green-Wood Cemetery in Brooklyn, New York. The eighty-percent life-size statue depicts the Hidatsa chief and is based on a painting by Catlin who was later buried in the Gregory family plot, to which this statue will serve as a marker.

Another notable work by Coleman, Visions of Change is a large bronze sculpture depicting a Native American atop a hill overlooking a stampede of bison juxtaposed against an American cowboy standing over a group of Longhorns also streaming down what appears like the other side of the hill. The sculpture is in the permanent collection of the Tucson Museum of Art.

== Personal life ==
Coleman married Sue Coleman when he was nineteen years old. They had attended the same high school and now live in Prescott, Arizona, where he has an art studio and private showroom. The Colemans have two daughters and five grandchildren.

== Awards and honors ==
- Gold Medal for Sculpture and Kieckhefer Award for Best of Show, Cowboy Artists of America Sale & Exhibition (2004).
- James Earl Frazer Award for Sculpture, Gold Medal for Sculpture and Nona Jean Hulsey Buyers' Choice Award for 1876: Gall—Sitting Bull—Crazy Horse, Prix de West (2009), National Cowboy & Western Heritage Museum.
- Gold Medal for Sculpture, and Kieckhefer Award for Best of Show for The Game of Arrows, Cowboy Artists of America (2009).
- Gold Medal for Drawing, Cowboy Artists of America's Sale & Exhibition (2009).

== Notable exhibitions ==
- Wildlife and Western Visions Art Show (2004), Raymond James Financial Center, St. Petersburg, Florida.
- Caught in Time: The Sculpture of John Coleman (2005), Desert Caballeros Western Museum, Wickenburg, Arizona.
- Gilcrease Rendezvous (2010), Gilcrease Museum, Tulsa, Oklahoma.
- Honored Life: The Art of John Coleman (2013), Eiteljorg Museum of American Indians and Western Art, Indianapolis, Indiana.
- John Coleman: Past/Present/Future (2016), Western Spirit: Scottsdale's Museum of the West, Scottsdale, Arizona.
- Spirit – Lives – Legends (2016), Legacy Gallery, Scottsdale, Arizona.
