= Western Spirit: Scottsdale's Museum of the West =

Western Spirit Museum: Scottsdale's Museum of the West
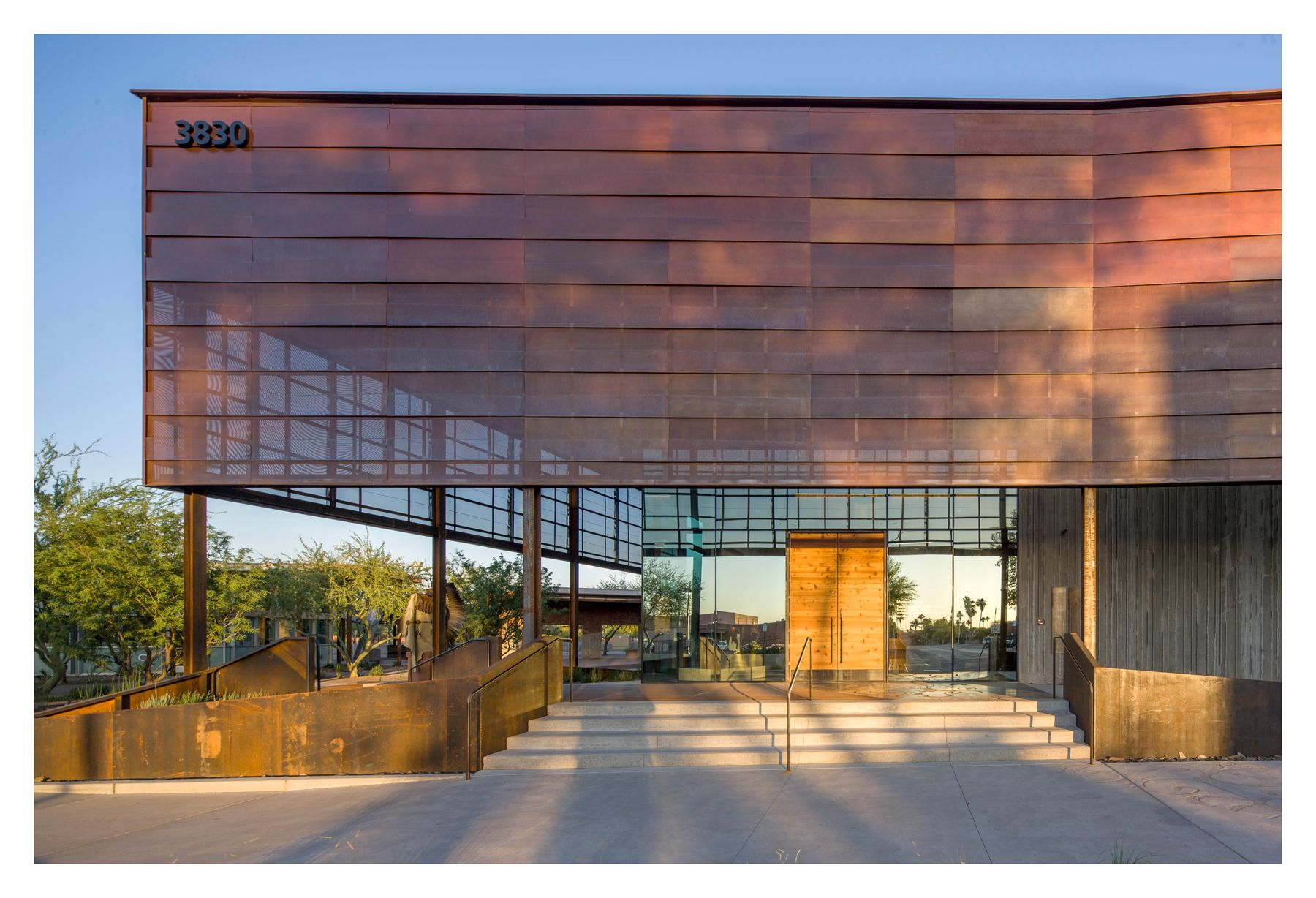
- Established: 2015
- Location: 3830 N. Marshall Way; Scottsdale, Arizona 85251; United States
- Coordinates: 33.4924°N 111.9285°W
- Type: Museum
- Executive director: Todd Bankofier
- CEO: Todd Bankofier
- Curators: Andrew Patrick Nelson, PhD
- Website: westernspirit.org

Western Spirit Museum: Scottsdale's Museum of the West is located in Old Town Scottsdale, Arizona on the former site of the Loloma Transit Station (N Marshall Way and E 1st St). It opened in January 2015. The two-story, 55,000-square-foot museum features the art, culture and history of 19 states in the American West, Western Canada, and Mexico.

== History ==
Opened in 2015, Western Spirit: Scottsdale's Museum of the West was conceived by former Scottsdale mayor Herb Drinkwater, who served from 1980 to 1996. The 43,000 square foot museum broke ground on January 20, 2014. Located in Old Town Scottsdale, Western Spirit is owned by the City of Scottsdale and operated by the Scottsdale Museum of the West, a non-profit organization incorporated in 2007. A board of trustees, through the museum director, oversees day-to-day operations.

The building houses eight exhibition spaces, the 135-seat Virginia G. Piper Charitable Trust Theater and Auditorium, the Christine and Ted Mollring Sculpture Courtyard, and the Sue and Robert Karatz Museum Store.

Western Spirit has been a Smithsonian Affiliate since 2015.

From 2016 to 2025, True West Magazine named Western Spirit "The Nation's Best Western Museum."

Notable past exhibitions include Maynard Dixon's American West; By Beauty Obsessed: Gilbert Waldman Collects the West; Charles M. Russell: The Women in His Life and Art; Marjorie Thomas: Arizona Art Pioneer; and The Taos Society of Artists.

Mike Fox served as director/CEO from 2008 to 2022. Dr. James Burns, former director of the Arizona Historical Society, became executive director of Western Spirit in October 2021.

== Mission and vision ==
Mayor Drinkwater and others who shared his vision saw an opportunity for Scottsdale, known as "The West's Most Western Town", to establish itself as a center for the study and appreciation of the region's history, encompassing Indigenous peoples, Spanish and Mexican settlers, and Western pioneers, and to become a place "where the Old West meets the New West." Founding director and CEO Mike Fox said, "We are not a museum of objects, but a museum of ideas." Storytelling is the heart of Western Spirit's mission, immersing visitors in the unique heritage of the region—"illuminating the past to shape our future." Rotating exhibitions of artworks, artifacts, and cultural objects, interactive experiences, presentations, performances, and events allow visitors to explore and discover the American West for themselves.

== Architecture and grounds ==
Christiana Moss and Christopher Alt of the architectural firm Studio MA, based in Clifton, New Jersey and Phoenix, Arizona, designed the building. Landscape architects Colwell and Michele Shelor of Phoenix, Arizona designed the grounds.

Both interior and exterior spaces are LEED Gold Standard certified for conserving natural resources.

The surfaces, materials, colors, shapes, and building techniques are intended, as Moss says, to "describe what the West means in physical form and what it can mean for visitors and residents." The concrete ribbing on the exterior of the building mimics the ribs of the saguaro cactus, serving not only a decorative purpose but providing passive vertical shade. The "weeping wall" in the courtyard collects rainwater and recycles 100% of the condensation from the air conditioning system; this water flows into landscaping on the museum grounds. Decorative patterns made to age naturally over time echo Western saddles, old barns, and leather tooling. The use of Western red cedar throughout the lobby area brings a fragrance from the landscape indoors and adds to the environmental effect of the building.

As Moss observes, "The upper galleries represent the New West, shading and protecting the lower galleries, which represent the history and stories of the Old West, while the Courtyard serves as the center of the museum, though the design isn't linear—it's circular, spiral. It allows you to wander and find your own way through the museum with a kind of pioneering, exploring spirit."

== Inaugural exhibitions ==
The exhibits rotate periodically; the 2015 opening presented the following:

- Inspirational Journey: The Story of Lewis & Clark. Contemporary Western representational artist Charles Fritz (1955– ) retraced the route of the expedition (1804–1806) and chronicled it in 100 paintings. This exhibition will be displayed until October 31, 2016.
- Process and Materiality: The Bronze Artistry of John Coleman with Erik Petersen
- Will James: Cowboy Artist and Author. This exhibit presented the paintings, drawings, etchings, books, and ephemera of Will James (1892–1942) until May 31, 2016.
- The A.P. Hays Spirit of the West Collection featured saddles, spurs, holsters, revolvers and other quintessentially Western items on loan from Abe Hays, collector and founder of Arizona West Galleries in Scottsdale. The items show the union of the practical and the aesthetic.
- Fine Art of the American West: People and Places. Works by artists such as Charles Bird King, Georgia O'Keeffe, Ed Mell, Allan Houser, Kate T. Cory, and Marjorie Thomas reveal the variety of themes, styles, and imagery of Western art.
- Confluence of Cultures in the American West: A Selection of Contemporary Artists
- Courage and Crossroads: A Visual Journey through the Early American West

== Exhibition history ==
=== Recent ===
Featuring over 900 photographs and associated objects, Light and Legacy: The Art and Techniques of Edward S. Curtis celebrated the life and works of photographer, ethnographer, and adventurer Edward Curtis (1868–1952). From 1900 to 1930, Curtis traveled the land west of the Mississippi from Arizona to the High Arctic, visiting over 80 Indigenous peoples and creating thousands of images, audio recordings, and the earliest motion pictures of Native Americans, all while making tremendous contributions to the art and science of photography. Curtis's 20-volume publication, The North American Indian, remains unmatched in American ethnographic annals for its scope, depth, empathy, and artistry. This exhibition was on view through April 30, 2023.

=== Ongoing ===
- Courage & Crossroads: A Visual Journey through the American West: A presentation style pipe tomahawk given to Meriwether Lewis on the Lewis and Clark Expedition, Kit Carson's messenger pouch, and other rare and unique objects tell the story of the American West in the 19th and early 20th centuries alongside more than 100 paintings and sculptures by artists ranging from Thomas Moran and Alfred Jacob Miller to Frederic Remington, Charles M. Russell, and the Taos Founders. On loan from the Peterson Family Collection, these works attest to Board of Trustee Tim Peterson’s interest in Native American culture, the Fur Trapper period, and the early days on the Western frontier.
- Canvas of Clay: Hopi Pottery Masterworks from The Allan and Judith Cooke Collection: This exhibition celebrates six centuries of the Hopi people and culture with more than 65 of the finest examples of Hopi pottery from The Allan and Judith Cooke Collection. An interactive video describes the creation of Hopi pottery, with a special segment on the Cookes and the inspiration for their collection. Historic and contemporary masterworks include 18 pieces by Nampeyo, the most famous of the Hopi potters, as well as works by 22 additional master potters including Nampeyo's descendants. Western Spirit has acquired an additional 72 pieces from the collection, which will be rotated into the exhibition.
- Dr. Rennard Strickland's Profound Legacy: The Golden West on the Silver Screen: This exhibition, in memory of Dr. Rennard Strickland celebrates his life and legacy with posters and lobby cards selected from his world-renowned collection of more than 7,000 Western and Indian movie poster graphic arts, amassed over 50 years. Arizona State University Foundation for A New American University and Western Spirit are stewards of this collection of national and international importance for present and future generations.
- The A.P. Hays Spirit of the West Collection: This exhibition includes 1,400 Old West items, such as revolvers, rifles, saddles, knives, holsters, spurs, chaps, badges, many exceedingly rare, from the collection of Scottsdale gallerist A.P. Hays. Themes include working cowboys, Wild West shows, Western gear made in prisons, rodeos and fairs, Western movies and parades, outlaws and lawmen, Western saloons, and illustrations.
- Of Spirit and Flame: John Coleman Bronzes from the Collection of Frankie and Howard Alper: This includes more than 20 bronze sculptures by Arizona-based, award-winning sculptor and painter John Coleman, one of the nation's most celebrated contemporary interpreters of the American West. An interactive video kiosk allows visitors to learn about the lost-wax casting process of bronze sculpture.

=== Past ===
- Arizona Highways: The Art of Our Photography - November 12, 2021 - January 16, 2022
- The Morton and Donna Fleischer American Military Saddle Collection - October 1, 2020 – 2021
- The Abe Hays Family Maynard Dixon Collection - October 1, 2020 – May 24, 2021
- Maynard Dixon's American West - October 15, 2019 – August 2, 2021
- By Beauty Obsessed: Gilbert Waldman Collections the West - September 10, 2019 – August 23, 2021
- Will James: Cowboy & Artists & Author - May 7, 2019 – August 18, 2019
- Charles M. Russell: The Women in His Life and Art - November 20, 2018 – April 14, 2019
- New Beginnings: An American Story of Romantics and Modernists in the West - October 16, 2018 – September 15, 2019
- New Acquisitions from the Herberger Collection - September 11, 2018 - November 25, 2018
- A Spotlight on Contemporary Hopi Ceramicists and Katsina Doll Carvers - February 13, 2018 – November 25, 2018
- The Art of Joe Beeler: A Western Original - January 16, 2018 – October 28, 2018
- Western Edge: Humor and Playfulness in Contemporary Western Art - January 9, 2018 – September 9, 2018
- Of Spirit and Flame: John Coleman Bronzes from the Collection of Frankie and Howard Alper - June 2017 – January 17, 2021
- The Rennard Strickland Collection of Western Film History - June 20, 2017 – September 30, 2018
- Grand Canyon Grandeur - June 6, 2017 – December 31, 2017
- The Taos Society of Artists - January 10, 2017 – April 30, 2017
- The Scottsdale Craftsmen: A 70-Year Legacy - December 20, 2016 - February 11, 2018
- Marjorie Thomas: Arizona Art Pioneer - December 20, 2016 – January 7, 2018
- John Coleman: Past/ Present/ Future - September 17, 2016 – May 31, 2017
- Lone Wolf (Hart M. Schultz): Cowboy, Actor & Artist - June 21, 2016 – August 31, 2016
- A Salute to Cowboy Artists of America and a Patron, The Late Eddie Basha: 50th Years of Amazing Contributions to the American West - November 7, 2015 – May 31, 2016
- Will James: Cowboy & Artists & Author - January 15, 2015 – December 2016
- Confluence of Cultures in the American West: A Selection of Contemporary Artists from the Peterson Collection - January 15, 2015 – January 13, 2019
- Inspirational Journey: The Story of Lewis and Clark, Featuring the Artwork of Charles Fritz - January 15, 2015 – October 30, 2016
- The Heritage Hall: Photographs and Biographies of People Who Have Made a Contribution to the American West, Past and Present - January 15, 2015 – 2016
- Process and Materiality: The Bronze Artistry of John Coleman with Erik Petersen - January 15, 2015 – October 11, 2015
- Fine Art of the American West: People and Places - January 15, 2015 – October 11, 2015

== The Sue and Robert Karatz Museum Store ==
Unique offerings celebrate the western lifestyle at Western Spirit’s Sue and Robert Karatz Museum Store, the “Best Place to Get AZ Stuff," according to Phoenix Magazine. The store has pottery, glassware and kitchen gear, books, jewelry, children's items, and more. All purchases are tax-free and benefit the museum's non-profit organization. Admission to the store is free. Museum members receive up to 15% off purchases.
