= Lord Arthur's Bed =

2008 play by Martin Lewton

- Original language: English
- Written by: Martin Lewton
- Characters: Donald; Jim
- Subject: Reliving the lives of Victorian transvestites Ernest Boulton and Frederick Park through the eyes of contemporary gay culture
- Genre: Drama
- Setting: 2000s; Apartment in London's West End

Premiere
- Date: 14 May 2008
- Place: Brighton Festival; Brighton, England

Lord Arthur's Bed is a play by English playwright Martin Lewton. The play premiered at the Brighton Festival on 14 May 2008. It subsequently toured nationally in 2008, and transferred to Dublin in 2009.

The play is set in 2008 following the Civil Partnership of the two protagonists, who find themselves living in a house once occupied by Lord Arthur Clinton MP and transvestite Ernest Boulton. It caused some considerable scandal on its opening in Brighton, when the Brighton newspaper "The Argus" led a story on the play with the headline "Sexually Explicit Play to be Staged in Church". As a result, the play sold out throughout its Brighton run.

== Characters ==
- Donald
- Jim

== Productions ==
The original (2008) tour was produced at the following venues:

- The Brighton Fringe
- The Carriageworks Theatre, Leeds
- The Rondo Theatre, Bath
- The Victoria Theatre, Settle
- The Square Chapel, Halifax
- The Lowry, Manchester
- The Drill Hall, London

In May 2009 the play was performed at the New Theatre in Dublin as part of the 2009 International Dublin Gay Theatre Festival

== Cast ==
The original (touring) cast was as follows:

- Donald : Paul Kendrick
- Jim : Paul Spruce

At the New Theatre in Dublin in May 2009, the cast was as follows:

- Donald : Spencer Charles Noll
- Jim : Paul Spruce

At The King's Head in March–April 2010, the cast was as follows:

- Donald : Spencer Charles Noll
- Jim : Ruaraidh Murray

== Awards and nominations ==
- 2009 Michael Mac Liammoir award for best actor: Spencer Charles Noll
