= Mary Manross =

American politician

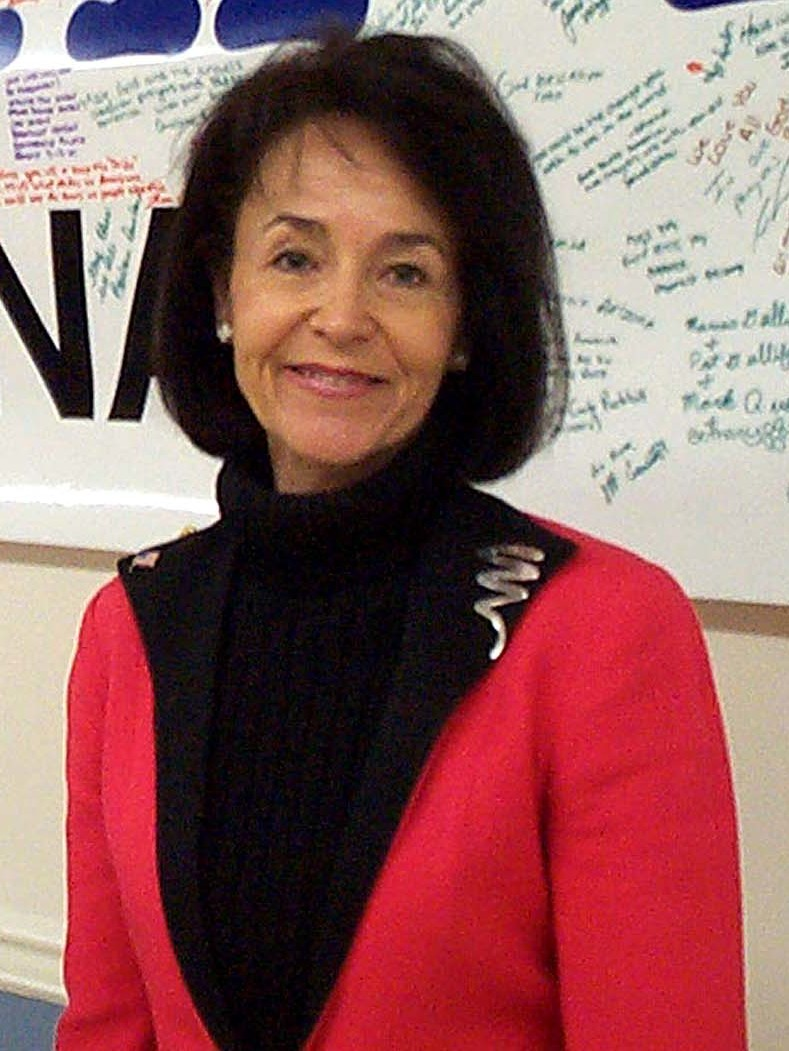

Mayor of Scottsdale
- In office June 2000 – September 2009
- Preceded by: Sam Campana
- Succeeded by: Jim Lane

Personal details
- Party: Democratic
- Spouse: Larry Manross
- Education: University of California at Los Angeles (BA); Minot State University

Mary Manross is an American politician who served as the 10th Mayor of Scottsdale, Arizona. First elected in June 2000 until September 2009, she served two terms and lost her campaign for a third term as mayor in the November 2008 runoff mayoral election to her opponent, former Certified Public Accountant and businessman and former city councilmember Jim Lane.

== Education ==
Manross earned a Bachelor of Arts in political science from the University of California at Los Angeles and a teaching credential from Minot State University.

== Career ==
Before her election as councilwoman, Manross served on several city government commissions and in leadership positions for local charitable organizations, as well as being campaign manager for Mayor Herb Drinkwater's 1984 and 1988 mayoral campaigns.

Manross served four terms on the Scottsdale city council from 1992 to 2000. Although the election and office of the mayor of Scottsdale is nonpartisan, Manross is a registered Democrat. Manross was endorsed by both the Democratic governor Janet Napolitano and the Republican Senator John McCain, and the Scottsdale Area Chamber of Commerce as well as the Sierra Club. Prior to the challenge from Jim Lane, her party affiliation was not an impediment in the conservative, largely Republican city of Scottsdale.

As mayor, Manross was instrumental in leading the city council to approve workplace protections for LGBT employees.

State-mandated changes in the election calendar which moved the traditional spring city election to align with fall federal and state elections brought more partisan voters into play in the 2008 election. Manross lost to Republican Jim Lane by less than 1/2 of 1 percent of the vote.

== Election history ==
Scottsdale Mayoral General Election 2000
Candidate	Votes	%
Mark D. Bristow	3,841	11.58
Ross Dean	13,756	41.52
Merlin D. Gindlesperger	1,061	3.20
Mary Manross	14,301	43.13

Scottsdale Mayoral Runoff Election 2000
Candidate	Votes	%
Ross Dean	14,298	44.21
Mary Manross	17,964	55.55

Scottsdale Mayoral General Election 2004
Candidate	Votes	%
Cynthia Lukas	5,507	15.40
Mary Manross (Incumbent)	16,903	47.26
David Ortega	7,627	21.33
Bob Usdane	5,663	15.83

Scottsdale Mayoral Runoff Election 2004
Candidate	Votes	%
Mary Manross (Incumbent)	21,949	66.43
David Ortega	11,007	33.32

Scottsdale Mayoral General Election 2008
Candidate	Votes	%
Mary Manross (Incumbent)	16,986	49.44
Jim Lane	17,373	50.56
