= List of mayors of Scottsdale =

The city of Scottsdale, Arizona has had 12 mayors since its incorporation in 1951.

No.	Name	Term start	Term end	Ref.
1	Malcolm White	1951	1958	
2	Mort Kimsey	1958	1962	
3	William Schrader	1962	1964	
4	John Woudenberg	1964	1964	
5	C.W. "Bill" Clayton	1964	1966	
6	Bud Tims	1966	1974	
7	William Jenkins	1974	1980	
8	Herbert Drinkwater	1980	1996	
9	Sam Campana	1996	2000	
10	Mary Manross	2000	2009	
11	W.J. "Jim" Lane	2009	2021	
12	David Ortega	2021	2025	
13	Lisa Borowsky	2025	Incumbent	
