= Jim Lane (mayor) =

American politician

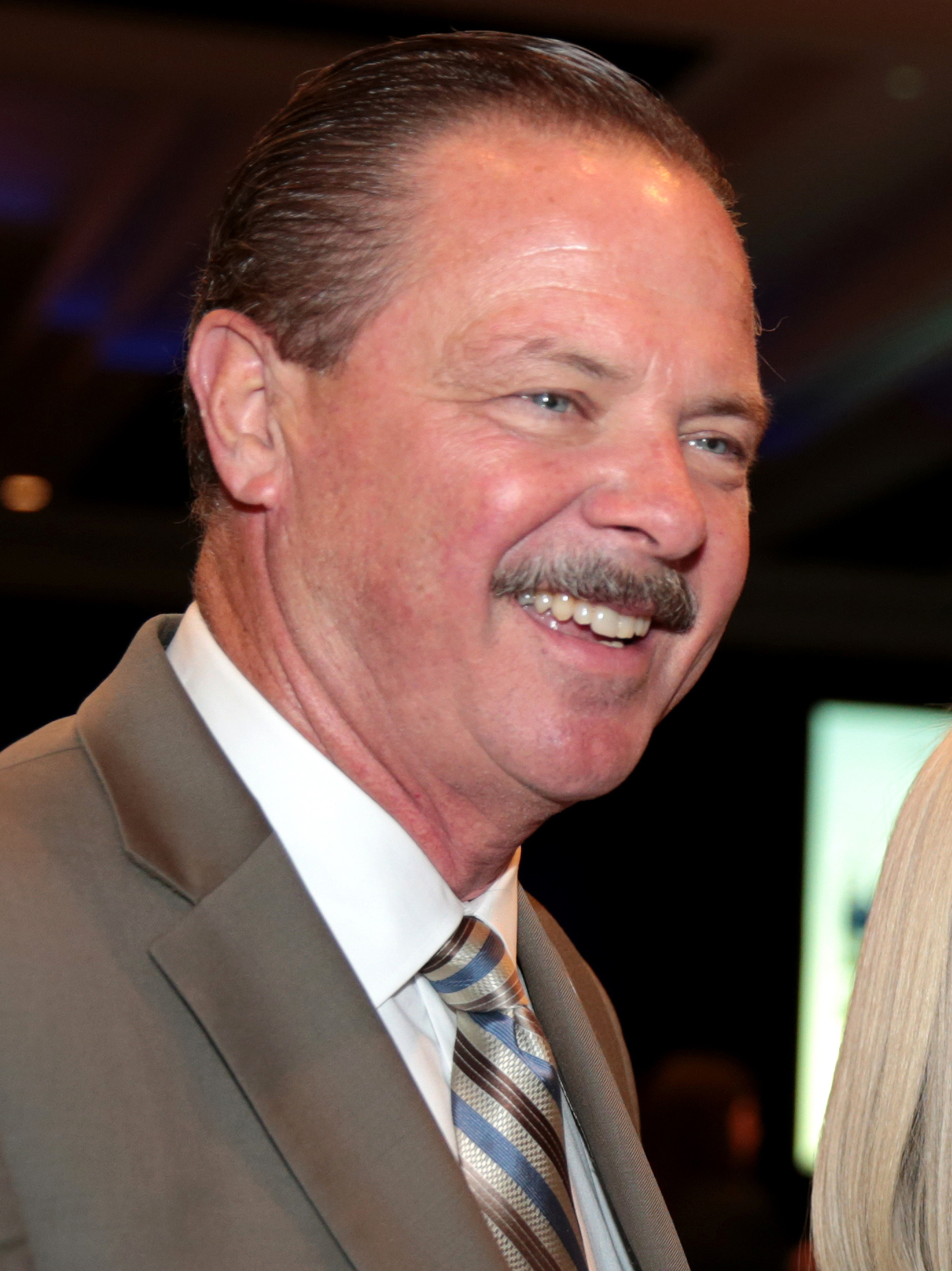
- Lane in 2017

Mayor of Scottsdale
- In office January 1, 2009 – January 1, 2021
- Preceded by: Mary Manross
- Succeeded by: David Ortega

Personal details
- Born: February 22, 1951 (age 75) New Jersey, U.S.
- Party: Republican
- Spouse: Joanne Lane
- Education: Saint Joseph's University (BS)
- Website: Lane's official mayoral website

W. J. "Jim" Lane is an American politician and businessman who served as mayor of Scottsdale, Arizona from 2009 to January 2021, when term limits forced his departure. A member of the Republican Party, he was first elected to the Scottsdale City Council in 2004, but note all municipal elections are non-partisan. Lane is a resident of the city's northern portion.

== Early life and education ==
A native of New Jersey, Lane attended Seton Hall Preparatory School in West Orange. He then earned a BS in accounting from Saint Joseph's University. Lane moved to Scottsdale in 1973.

== Career ==
Prior to entering politics, Lane was a businessman; he was described as a "technology consultant" by the Arizona Republic during his first political campaign. After college, Lane worked as a certified public accountant and financial statement auditor for KPMG for 20 years, between 1976 and 1996. Lane was elected president and chief operating officer of StatesWest Airlines on January 31, 1990. Shortly after, StatesWest Airlines discontinued all flying under its own name and entered into an agreement with USAir to operate as US Airways Express. He is the owner of Scottsdale-based internet service provider, financial consulting, and telecommunications company Chatham Hill Group LLC. Lane was also an adjunct instructor of business and accounting at Scottsdale Community College. Lane spent several years as an officer of the Board Of Management of the Scottsdale Paradise Valley YMCA.

=== Politics ===
In the summer of 2001, Lane was appointed to the city of Scottsdale's Fire and Emergency medical services Advisory Committee. He came to prominence locally for leading opposition to the proposed termination of the city's fire protection contract with Rural/Metro, and he co-chaired the Know Enough to Vote NO Committee, which advocated against Propositions 200 and 201. In April, 2003 Lane authored op-eds in the Phoenix Business Journal and the Scottsdale Republic in favor of retaining Rural/Metro, arguing that the existing private fire and EMS services were "excellent" and the measures would end up costing more while Scottsdale was experiencing a budget deficit. His effort was successful and the ballot measures were defeated by a wide margin, but Rural/Metro decided a few months later to abandon its work in Scottsdale after its contract expired in 2005, leading to the establishment of Scottsdale's municipal fire department. In a subsequent op-ed, Lane placed blame for the development on the International Association of Firefighters labor union, who had backed the measures, and were in failed contract negotiations with Rural/Metro.

==== City Council ====
Lane's early political involvement established the fiscal conservatism and engagement in economic issues that he would later run on. In 2004, Lane was a candidate for the Scottsdale City Council. He ran as a political outsider, criticizing the dominant political culture. Lane pledged to foster greater transparency and accountability, cut taxes, and reduce spending, especially by ending preferential treatment and subsidies for businesses. He supported all three measures on the ballot with the City Council vote, which would increase the sales tax to support the McDowell Sonoran Preserve purchases and increase police and fire funding. He also campaigned on revitalization of south Scottsdale, noise reduction at the Scottsdale Airport (which he lives near), and ensuring the smooth creation of Scottsdale's new fire department. Lane's candidacy for city council was endorsed by the Scottsdale Area Chamber of Commerce, the Arizona Republic, and the Coalition of Pinnacle Peak, a local fiscal responsibility political action committee. In a March primary election, all but one of the council candidates failed to secure the amount needed to avoid a runoff election. Lane places third in a field of nine candidates competing 4 open seats. The six candidates that moved on to the May 2004 general election placed in the same order as in the runoff; with the second-most votes, Lane was elected to the Scottsdale City Council. Lane was inaugurated to his first term on the city council on June 8, 2004.

Soon after his election, Lane joined other new council members-elect in criticizing the outgoing council's decision to vote on a controversial new compensation plan for the city manager on their last meeting, calling provisions that restricted the city council's ability to remove the city manager a violation of the city charter. An opponent of the city's expenditures on the development of the Los Arcos Mall site, in July 2004 Lane opposed the proposed ASU Scottsdale Center for New Technology and Innovation (later known as SkySong) on the same site, which he considered a risky investment not worth the city's subsidy. Lane expressed support for the banning of all subsidies and tax incentives for private businesses by the city government, and supported state legislation making such practices illegal. After Lane and fellow conservative Bob Littlefield were left out of the budget subcommittee's membership, Lane accused Mayor Mary Manross of politicizing the subcommittee appointments. In late 2005, Lane voted against the installation of photo radar speed enforcement on the Loop 101 freeway. Lane was sharply critical of three fellow council members during the Scottsdale's city council 2006 election, after, in what became a minor scandal, secretly "having a shill, Karl J. Kulick, represent himself as an independent voter to challenge" a candidate, who was disqualified for coming just under the signature requirement. However, Lane and some other council members raised eyebrows by endorsing candidates for the first time, rather than remaining neutral as had previously been traditional for sitting city council members; the candidate Lane endorsed, Bob Littlefield, was one of the council members Lane had accused of deceptive campaign practices. In 2007, Lane voted against a proposed plan to extend protections against discriminatory hiring practices to gay and transgender employees; the measure ultimately failed. In December 2007, a similar measure was passed by the City Council, again with Lane's opposition.

Lane was forbidden by term limits from running in 2020, and was replaced by David Ortega.

== Election history ==
Scottsdale City Council General Election 2004
Candidate	Votes	%
Henry Becker	10,065	8.6
Steve Capobres	7,487	6.4
Bill Crawford	8,873	7.6
Betty Drake	22,166	19.0
Merlin Gindlesperger	3,788	3.3
Jim Lane	17,502	15.0
Ron McCullagh	18,126	15.5
Tony Nelssen	11,684	10.0
Kevin Osterman	16,751	14.4

Scottsdale City Council Runoff Election 2004
Candidate	Votes	%
Henry Becker	8,694	10.5
Bill Crawford	7,739	9.3
Jim Lane	17,991	21.7
Ron McCullagh	19,774	23.8
Tony Nelssen	11,496	13.9
Kevin Osterman	17,153	20.7

Scottsdale Mayoral General Election 2008
Candidate	Votes	%
Mary Manross (Incumbent)	17,098	49.2
Jim Lane	17,463	50.3

Scottsdale Mayoral General Election 2008
Candidate	Votes	%
Mary Manross (Incumbent)	51,258	49.6
Jim Lane	51,848	50.2
