= Joseph C. Jackson =

Joseph Cooke Jackson
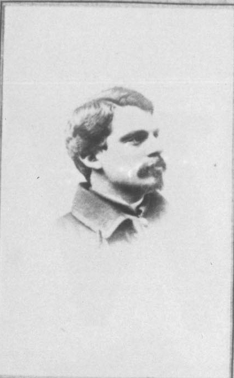
- Born: August 5, 1835; Newark, New Jersey, U.S.
- Died: May 22, 1913 (aged 77); New York City, U.S.
- Burial place: Cedar Hill Cemetery, Hartford, Connecticut, U.S.
- Alma mater: Yale University
- Spouse: Katharine Perkins Day (m. 1864–1913)
- Children: 4
- Military career
- Allegiance: United States (Union)
- Branch: United States Army (Union Army)
- Rank: Colonel; Bvt. Brigadier General
- Unit: 1st New Jersey Infantry Regiment
- Commands: 26th New Jersey Infantry Regiment
- Conflicts: American Civil War; Peninsula campaign; Siege of Yorktown; Seven Days Battles; Northern Virginia campaign; Second Battle of Bull Run; Maryland campaign; Battle of Antietam; Battle of Fredericksburg

Joseph Cooke Jackson (August 5, 1835 – May 22, 1913) was an American Brevet Brigadier General and lawyer who participated in the American Civil War. He commanded the 26th New Jersey Infantry Regiment and participated in at least 21 battles of the war throughout his military career. He was also the Commissioner of Naval Credits, saving thousands of resources for his home state. Jackson was also a prestigious lawyer, becoming the assistant United States District Attorney of the Southern District of New York in 1870.

== Early years ==
Joseph was born on August 5, 1835, at Newark, New Jersey as one of several children of John Peter Jackson and Elizabeth Huntington Wolcott Jackson as well as a descendant of the Huntington family. Jackson was educated at the Newark Academy, the Phillips Academy and finally at Yale University with 21 society and college honors with extra studies at the New York University and Harvard University. Jackson was then a member of the New York State Bar Association in 1860 and would begin actively practicing his legal career before the outbreak of the American Civil War.

== American Civil War ==
At the outbreak of the war, Jackson volunteered to be Aide-de-Camp for Brigadier General Robert Anderson. Jackson was then made 2nd Lieutenant of the 1st New Jersey Infantry Regiment at Company C on October 11, 1861. Jackson was then made Aide-de-Camp of Philip Kearny and was made as a part of Kearny's staff. During this time, Jackson was offered to command the 61st New York Infantry Regiment as a full Colonel but Jackson declined. Around the end of 1861, Jackson was made a part of William B. Franklin's general staff after Kearny was killed at the Battle of Chantilly and on August 20, 1862, was promoted to captain. Jackson then participated in the Seven Days Battles before being assigned to the VI Corps of the Army of the Potomac. He also participated in the Siege of Yorktown, the Second Battle of Bull Run, the Battle of Antietam and the Battle of Fredericksburg. After Jackson was promoted to Lieutenant Colonel on December 2, 1862, Jackson was made the United States Commissioner of Naval Credits. During his service within that office, Jackson managed to get the state to avoid a draft of troops, supplying almost 2,000 naval enlistments and saving the entire state of New Jersey $1,000,000 from bounties according to Governor Joel Parker. Around 1864, Jackson married Katharine Perkins Day and proceeded to have 4 children with her. Jackson was then promoted to full colonel as well as brevetted Brigadier General on March 13, 1865, for "faithful and meritorious services in the field".

== Legal career ==
After being mustered out, Jackson continued his legal career at New York City before being admitted into the United States Supreme Court and Jackson began getting involved within the State Courts of New York and New Jersey. In 1870, Jackson became the assistant District Attorney of the Southern District of New York in 1870. He was also a counselor of the United New Jersey Railroad and Canal Company, the Orange and Alexandria Railroad, the East Tennessee, Virginia and Georgia Railway, the Memphis and Charleston Railroad and numerous other banks and corporations. Jackson was also an active member of the Republican Party in New York and New Jersey, actively advocating for it. He was also a member of the Society of Political Reform and an active participant in the removal of Police Commissioner Gardner and Oliver Charlick. For many years, Jackson was the director of the New York City Mission as well as the vice president of the Yale Alumni Association of the City of New York. In 1888, Jackson acted as Grand Marshal for James G. Blaine as Jackson was a frequent contributor of the press. Jackson was also a member of the Union League Club and the Law Institute.
