= Ray Swanson =

American painter (1937–2004)

- Born: October 4, 1937; Alcester, South Dakota, U.S.
- Died: December 17, 2004 (aged 67)
- Education: Northrop Aeronautical Institute
- Occupation: Painter
- Spouse: Beverly Anderton
- Children: 1 son, 1 daughter

Ray Swanson (October 4, 1937 – December 17, 2004) was an American painter of the American West, especially Native Americans.

== Early life ==
Swanson was born on October 4, 1937, in Alcester, South Dakota. His grandfather was an "amateur painter," and his brother Gary was also a painter. Swanson graduated from the Northrop Aeronautical Institute in 1960.

== Career ==
Swanson began his career as an engineer in California, and he opened a gallery in Oak Glen, San Bernardino County, California, in the 1960s. In 1973, he left California to establish the Christian Academy of Prescott in Prescott, Arizona, in 1973. He later moved to Carefree, Arizona, where he opened a studio.

Swanson became a professional painter of the American West, especially Native Americans. His paintings depicted the lives of the Hopi, Zuni and Navajo tribes. He often painted on the Navajo Nation reservation. Swanson's paintings were not caricatures of Native Americans but realistic depictions, and they were thus "positively received by the Indian community."

Swanson was a member of the Cowboy Artists of America from 1986 to 2004. He won a gold medal from the National Academy of Western Art in 1975. His work was added to the collection of the Phippen Museum in Prescott.

== Personal life and death ==
Swanson married Beverly Anderton; they had a son, Steven, and a daughter, Pamela. He died on December 17, 2004. His funeral was held at the Desert Springs Bible Church in Phoenix, Arizona.
