= Thomas Bayne Denègre =

American lawyer

Denegre on June 15, 1914

Thomas Bayne Denègre, Sr. (January 18, 1893 – June 1967) of New Orleans, Louisiana was captain of the Yale University sport rowing team.

== Biography ==
He was born on January 18, 1893, in New Orleans, Louisiana. He was captain of the sport rowing team and graduated from Yale University in 1914. He served in France as first lieutenant in the Louisiana National Guard's Washington Artillery during World War I.

Denègre then attended Tulane Law School and practiced law in New Orleans. He married Alma Baldwin and had three children including World War II submarine commander Thomas Bayne Denègre, Jr. He died in June 1967 in Biloxi, Mississippi.
