= Jacob Merrill Manning =

American clergyman

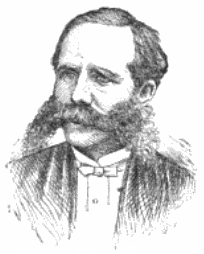
- Born: December 31, 1824; Greenwood, New York
- Died: November 29, 1882 (aged 57); Portland, Maine
- Education: Amherst College; Andover Theological Seminary
- Occupation: Clergyman

Jacob Merrill Manning (December 31, 1824 – November 29, 1882) was a prominent Congregational clergyman, active in Boston, Massachusetts.

== Biography ==
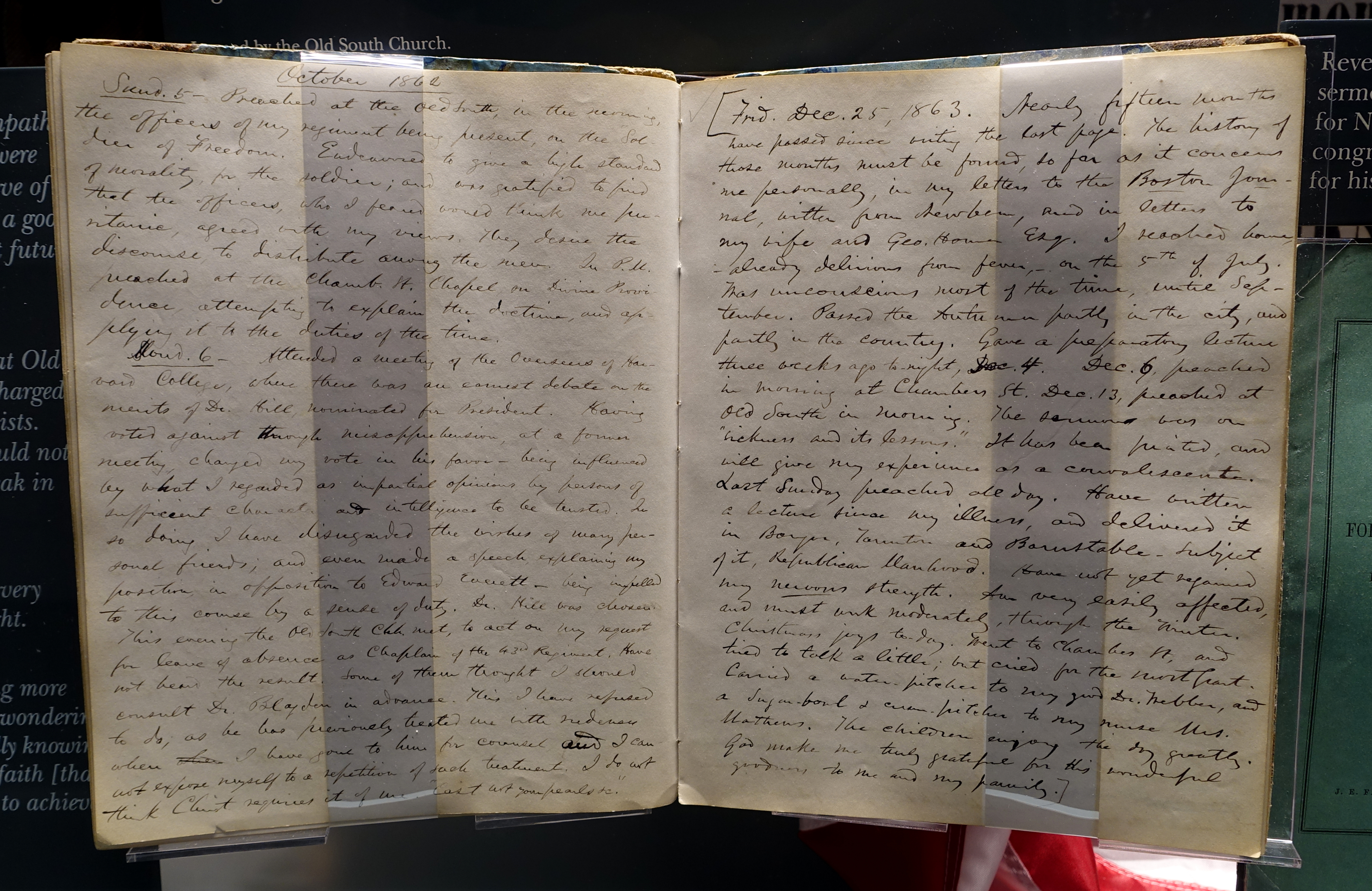
Diary of Jacob Merrill Manning

Manning was born in Greenwood, New York, graduated from Amherst College in 1850, studied theology at Andover Theological Seminary, and in 1854 was ordained as pastor of the Mystic Church in Medford, Massachusetts. In 1857 he became assistant pastor of Old South Church, Boston, where he became pastor in 1872 until he stepped down on March 15, 1882. He served as chaplain to the Massachusetts State Senate in 1858-1859, chaplain to the 43d Massachusetts regiment in 1862-1863. In addition, he was a member of the Boston school board, and overseer of Harvard University from 1860 to 1866, trustee of the Massachusetts state library from 1865 to 1882, and lecturer at Andover Theological Seminary from 1866 to 1872.

He published numerous sermons and addresses, and was a widely popular speaker. Among his best-known lectures was one on Samuel Adams, and among his orations the one that he delivered in May 1861, on the raising of the National flag upon the steeple of the Old South Church, and his eulogy on Henry Wilson at the state-house, Boston, in 1875.

He died in Portland, Maine.

== Selected works ==
- The Death of Abraham Lincoln, 1865
- Peace under Liberty
- Half Truths and The Truth, 1873
- Helps to a Life of Prayer, 1875
