= Joseph Converse Heywood =

Joseph Converse Heywood (1834 - December 19, 1900) was a lawyer and writer of dramatic poems. Born in Cumberland County, Maine, he trained at Harvard University and became a lawyer before pursuing literary interests and settling in a palace in Rome. He wrote poems.

In 1869 he filed a patent for improvements to weighing machines.

Oscar Wilde was not a fan of his poem about Salome, but American critics were more favorable.

== Writings ==
- Salome, the Daughter of Herodias (1862), reissued in 1872 with Antoniois and Salone: How Will it End? A Romance as a trilogy
- How they Strike One, three Authors (1877)
- Sforza, A Tragedy in Venice (1885)
- Lady Merton: A Tale of the Eternal City (1891)
- Il Nano Italiano: A Libretto (1892)
