= John Safford Fiske =

Consul of the United States (1838–1907)

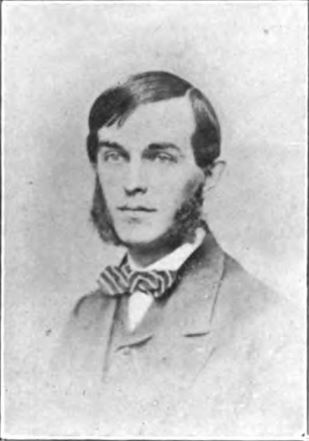
John Safford Fiske as a young man

John Safford Fiske (January 18, 1838 – June 11, 1907) was an American diplomat who served as a Consul of the United States at Leith, Scotland. He was forced to leave his post after being involved in a sex scandal.

== Biography ==
John Safford Fiske was born on January 18, 1838, in Ashtabula, Ohio, the son of Isaac Hubbard Fiske (1811–1877) and Mary Safford (1816–1876). He attended Williston Seminary, in Easthampton, Massachusetts and in 1859 went to Yale College, graduating in 1863.

From 1863 to 1864 he worked as a deputy clerk in Albany for the New York State Senate. In 1865 he was a private tutor near New York City. In October 1867 he was nominated by President Andrew Johnson the United States consul in Leith, Scotland.

While abroad Fiske was involved in the scandal concerning Ernest Boulton and Frederick Park. In 1868, when Boulton and Park were in Edinburgh, Fiske had an affair with Boulton. After Boulton went back to London, Fiske continued to send him love letters. In 1870 Fiske was in London, where he was arrested and charged with "conspiracy to commit buggery". He decide to resign as a United States consul to avoid the involvement of his country in the scandal, even if he continued to maintain that he was innocent. In 1871, Fiske was acquitted, as there was no evidence against him of a crime being committed.

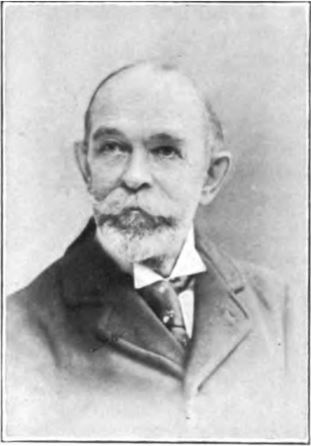
John Safford Fiske

After the trial, Fiske went to Düsseldorf, Germany, where he lived for a year, spending most of the time painting, almost exclusively architectural subjects. He returned to the US, where he spent the following three years. By May 1874 he was again in Europe, where he lived for the rest of his life, first in Düsseldorf, and then Pinneberg (Holstein), Ecouen, near Paris (where he lived "with an English friend"), and from 1876 to 1877 in Constantinople. In the end Fiske settled in Italy, at Alassio, in 1882.

In 1873 he published a translation of Caine's Voyage aux Pyrénées. He also wrote of current events to various newspapers, from Sweden, Russia, Germany, Turkey, Greece, and Italy. He contributed to The Nation (New York) since its founding. In 1893 he contributed a good number of articles to the Dictionary of Architecture, edited by Russell Sturgis. He was a reporter for the World's Columbian Exposition in Chicago in 1893. He was a lecturer on art and architecture at Hobart College, Geneva, New York. In 1897 he received a L.H.D (honorary degree) from Hobart College and when he died in 1907, he left 4,000 books to the college.
