= Louis Judson Swinburne =

American author (1855–1887)

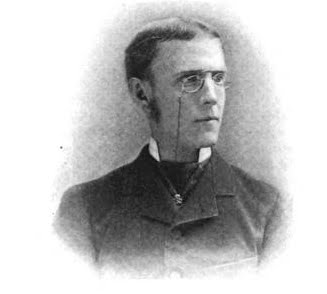
- Swinburne in a 1906 publication
- Born: August 24, 1855; Albany, New York, U.S.
- Died: December 9, 1887 (aged 32); Colorado Springs, Colorado, U.S.
- Education: Yale College
- Occupation: Writer
- Father: John Swinburne

Louis Judson Swinburne (August 24, 1855 – December 9, 1887) was an American writer.

== Early life ==
Louis Judson Swinburne was born on August 24, 1855, in Albany, New York, to Harriet (née Judson) and John Swinburne.

In 1870, Swinburne lived in Europe for a period with his family. His father was in charge of the camp hospital service attached to the French army. In 1875, he printed Paris Sketches with a private circulation about the incidents of his life during the Siege of Paris. In 1872, he returned to Albany. He wrote an essay on the novels of William Black and was commended by Black in a personal letter for his analysis. He graduated from Yale College in 1874. He won the De Forest Literary Prize.

== Career ==
Swinburne had poor health his last year in college and in 1880, he went west in search of better health. He moved to a sheep ranch in Colorado and lived in Colorado for the remainder of his life.

Swinburne rewrote Paris Sketches. He completed for early publication a volume of essays and a work on English Romanticism.

== Personal life ==
Swinburne did not marry. He died of a hemorrhage of the lungs on December 9, 1887, in Colorado Springs, Colorado.
