= Matt Cook (historian) =

British historian and academic

Professor Matt Cook FRHistS
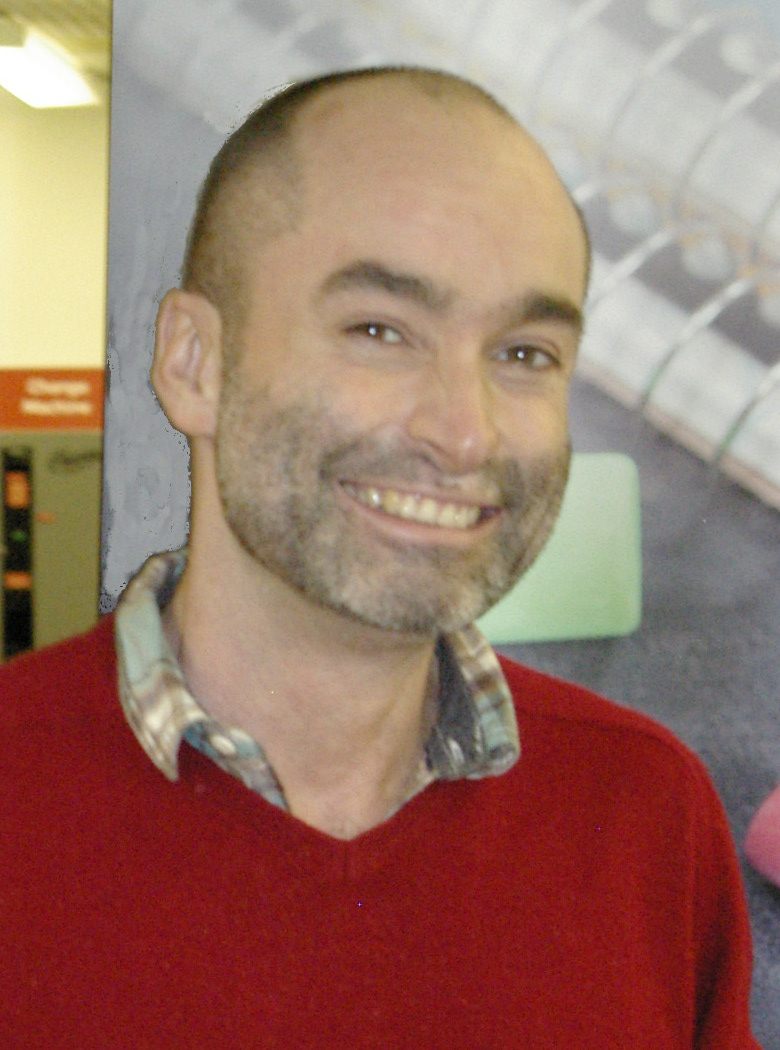
- Born: 1969 (age 56–57)
- Title: Jonathan Cooper Professor of the History of Sexuality
- Children: 3

Academic background
- Education: University of Sheffield (BA); Queen Mary University of London (MA, PhD)

Academic work
- Discipline: History
- Sub-discipline: History of sexuality; LGBT history; Cultural history; History of London
- Institutions: Keele University; Birkbeck, University of London; Mansfield College, Oxford

Matthew "Matt" Cook FRHistS (born 1969) is an English social and cultural historian specializing in LGBTQ and queer history. Since October 2023, he has served as the Jonathan Cooper Chair of the History of Sexuality at Mansfield College, Oxford University. The appointment makes him the UK's first professor of LGBTQ+ history.

Cook was educated at a state secondary school in Staffordshire and received his BA from the University of Sheffield and his MA and PhD from Queen Mary University of London. He then served as a lecturer at Keele University from 2002 to 2005. He went on to teach for 18 years at Birkbeck College, University of London, where he ultimately was named professor of modern history and head of the Department of History, Classics and Archaeology. While at Birkbeck he also directed the Raphael Samuel History Centre.

Cook worked with the National Trust in 2017 on their Prejudice and Pride programme and co-authored its associated guidebook. He has also advised on archival projects related to the history of gender and sexuality, including English Heritage's Pride of Place and the Pitt Rivers Museum's Beyond the Binary. He is a series editor of the Queer and Trans Histories series at Manchester University Press and a member of the editorial board of History Workshop Journal.

== Personal life ==
Cook is gay. He has three children.

== Selected publications ==
- London and the Culture of Homosexuality, 1885–1914 (Cambridge: Cambridge University Press, 2003).
- A Gay History of Britain: Love and Sex Between Men Since the Middle Ages (Oxford: Greenwood, 2007); editor and lead author.
- Queer 1950s: Rethinking Sexuality in the Post-War Years (Basingstoke: Palgrave Macmillan, 2012); co-editor with Heike Bauer.
- Queer Cities, Queer Cultures: Sexuality and Urban Life in Post-1945 Europe (London: Continuum, 2014); co-editor with Jennifer Evans.
- Queer Domesticities: Homosexuality and Home Life in Twentieth-Century London (London: Palgrave, 2014).
- Prejudice & Pride: Celebrating LGBTQ Heritage (London: National Trust, 2017); co-author with Alison Oram.
- Queer Beyond London: LGBTQ Stories from Four English Cities (Manchester: Manchester University Press, 2022); co-author with Alison Oram.
- Writing Queer History (London: Bloomsbury, 2026).
- A Queer Scrapbook: Britain and Ireland since 1945 (Manchester: Manchester University Press, 2026); co-editor with Justin Bengry, Rebecca Jennings and E-J Scott.
