= Samuel Dorr Faulkner =

American politician

Samuel Dorr Faulkner (November 14, 1835 – August 9, 1878) was a New York lawyer, judge, and politician.

== Life ==
Faulkner, son of Hon. James Faulkner and Minerva (Hammond) Faulkner, was born in Dansville, New York, November 14, 1835.

He entered Yale College at the age of 20, graduating in 1859 with an older and a younger brother. After graduation, he studied law in the Albany Law School, and was admitted to the bar in May, 1860. In the following November he entered into partnership with S. Hubbard, Esq., for the practice of law in Dansville, which co-partnership existed till 1864, when Hubbard was elected County Judge. In 1862, Faulkner was appointed Supervisor of Dansville, to fill a vacancy, and was elected to the same position in the two succeeding years. In 1866 he was elected to the New York State Assembly as a Democrat, in a district which was strongly Republican, and in 1871 was elected County Judge and Surrogate, overcoming an opposition majority of over 1,000. In 1874 he received the Democratic nomination for US Congress in his district, and in the situation of parties at that time his election would have been certain if he had consented to run; but the state of his health would not permit him to enter the canvass. In the fall of 1877 he was rd-elected County Judge and Surrogate for a second term of six years, overcoming as before a very large opposition majority.

In the fall of 1873, his unremitting application to judicial and professional duties brought on a hemorrhage of the lungs which compelled him to spend the remaining winters of his life in Florida or Colorado. From each of these visits he returned apparently much strengthened, but only to exhaust himself again by close attention to his duties. On July 22, 1878, while returning home from a session of court, the horse he was driving stumbled and fell, and the shock which he received from the accident brought on a succession of hemorrhages, which caused his death, at Dansville, on August 9, in the 43rd year of his age. He was unmarried.
