= Herman Norton Barnum =

Christian missionary

- Born: December 5, 1826 near Auburn, New York
- Died: 1910; Harpoot, Turkey
- Occupation: Christian missionary

Herman Norton Barnum (December 5, 1826 – May 19, 1910) was a Christian missionary stationed in Kharpert. In his 1910 obituary by the Andover Theological Seminary, Barnum was called "one of the most competent missionaries sent out from America." During the Hamidian massacres, Barnum's actions prevented a three-story structure, from being burned down by Turkish troops while 300 Armenians—including schoolchildren—were inside.
