= Shyam Telikicherla =

Shyam Telikicherla is an architectural designer, engineer, artist and musician from the Washington, DC area. He is currently based in Chicago, IL. Currently a member of the band Cassettes on Tape and formerly a member of the band Metropolitan.

== Discography ==
Cassettes on Tape

- Cathedrals EP - 2012

METROPOLITAN

- Down For You is Up - 2002
- The Lines They Get Broken - 2005

Meghan Hayes

- Snow On the Waves - 2000
- Give the Guard a Break - 2005
