= Newton Spaulding Manross =

American scientist and engineer

Newton Spaulding Manross (June 20, 1825 – September 17, 1862) was an American scientist and engineer.

== Early life and education ==
He was born in Bristol, Connecticut. He graduated from Yale College in 1850. He sailed for Europe the day after graduation, and spent a year and a half in studying chemistry at the University of Göttingen. He received the degree of Doctor of Philosophy from that university in 1852.

== Career ==
After spending three months in traveling on Continental Europe, mainly in visiting mines, Manross returned to the United States in the summer of 1852. The following year he spent at his home in Bristol, constructing machinery. In the fall of 1853 he sailed for the Orinoco in an exploring company in search of mining investment, and spent four or five months in examining the gold, region of the Yuruarí River, between the Orinoco and Amazon River. He returned home by way of Trinidad in the spring of 1854. In the spring of 1856 he went to the Isthmus of Panama, where he passed the summer in exploring for coal, iron, and other minerals in Chiriquí Province. Immediately after his return he set out for Mexico, where he was engaged for six months in searching for coal and iron, principally in the district between the City of Mexico and the Pacific coast. During this trip he visited many of the great silver districts, and descended into the craters of El Jorullo and Popocatépetl. He returned home in July, 1857, and for several years remained in Bristol, (Forestville,) Conn, engaged in perfecting mechanical and chemical inventions.

For one year, Manross was a professor of chemistry at Amherst College. He subsequently raised a company of volunteers and became captain of the 16th Connecticut Infantry Regiment's K Company.

He was the author of several papers in the American Journal of Science and Arts, and was already eminent for his scientific attainments when he gave up his life for his country.

== Personal life ==
Manross married Charlotte H. Royce on November 3, 1857. He died during the Battle of Antietam on September 17, 1862.
