= Herb Drinkwater =

American politician (1936–1997)

Mayor of Scottsdale, Arizona
- In office 1980–1996
- Preceded by: Bill Jenkins
- Succeeded by: Sam Campana

Personal details
- Born: August 28, 1936 New York
- Died: December 28, 1997 (age 61) Scottsdale, Arizona

Herbert Raymond Drinkwater (August 28, 1936 – December 28, 1997) was an American politician from the state of Arizona. Herbert Raymond Drinkwater, was the oldest child of Herbert Drinkwater (1909-1992) and Alice Estella Bumstead (1913-1987). His father was born in England, his mother in New York, where they married and had their first child: Herbert. After World War II, the family moved to Phoenix where Herbert Sr was a high school math teacher.

Drinkwater was mayor of Scottsdale from 1980 to 1996, when he was diagnosed with salivary gland cancer.

== Personal ==
One of Drinkwater's sons, Mark Drinkwater, used to own Drinkwater's City Hall Restaurant at the Scottsdale Airport in Scottsdale. Mark was also part of the ownership group at Drinkwater's City Hall Steakhouse in downtown Scottsdale but sold the restaurant in 2007 and the name changed to Mastro's City Hall Steakhouse.

== Legacy ==
The city of Scottsdale has a boulevard named after him; a statue of Drinkwater was built at the boulevard. The statue was dedicated on May 10, 2003.
