= List of Arizona companies =

Location of Arizona

Arizona is a state in the southwestern region of the United States. The region's second-quarter 2018 gross state product was $344.6 billion, with growth driven by the information and manufacturing sectors. The state ranked #17 on Forbes' list of Best States For Business in 2018, noting strong economic and job growth forecasts. Arizona's economy historically relied on the "five C's": copper, cotton, cattle, citrus, and climate. While Arizona's copper mining is still the nation's primary source of the metal, services and manufacturing are now the drivers of the state's economy.

== Notable firms ==
This list includes notable companies with primary headquarters located in the state. The industry and sector follow the Industry Classification Benchmark taxonomy. Organizations which have ceased operations are included and noted as defunct.

Notable companies Status: P=Private, S=State; A=Active, D=Defunct
Name	Industry	Sector	Headquarters	Founded	Notes	Status	
Align Technology	Health care	Health care equipment	Tempe	1997	Clear aligners and dental scanners	P	A
All Aboard America!	Industrials	Transportation services	Mesa	1936	Motorcoach operator	P	A
Amkor Technology	Technology	Semiconductors	Tempe	1968	Semiconductors	P	A
Apache Nitrogen Products	Basic materials	Chemicals	St. David	1920	Nitrogen products for mining and fertilizer	P	A
Apollo Education Group	Consumer services	Specialized consumer services	Phoenix	1973	Education	P	A
Arizona Financial Credit Union	Financials	Banks	Phoenix	1936	Credit unions and financial services	P	A
Arizona Public Service	Utilities	Conventional electricity	Phoenix	1885	Utility, part of Pinnacle West Capital	P	A
ASARCO	Industrials	Mining	Tucson	1888	Metals and mining	P	A
Avnet	Industrials	Electrical components & equipment	Phoenix	1921	Electronics	P	A
Axon Enterprise	Industrials	Electronic equipment	Scottsdale	1991	Manufacturer of body cameras and LEO equipment	P	A
Banner Health	Healthcare	Healthcare providers	Phoenix	1999	Healthcare and hospitals	P	A
Barrett-Jackson	Consumer services	Recreational services	Scottsdale	1971	Collector car auction company	P	A
Bashas'	Consumer services	Food retailers & wholesalers	Chandler	1932	Grocery stores	P	A
Benchmark Electronics	Industrials	Manufacturing	Tempe	1979	Contract manufacturing	P	A
Best Western	Consumer services	Hotels	Phoenix	1946	Hotels	P	A
Cable One	Consumer Services	Specialized consumer services	Phoenix	1997	Internet and cable service provider	P	A
Carlisle Companies	Industrials	Manufacturing	Scottsdale	1917	Construction and automotive materials	P	A
Carvana	Consumer goods	Specialty reatilers	Tempe	2013	Auto dealer	P	A
Circle K	Consumer services	Specialty retailers	Tempe	1951	Convenience store chain	P	A
Cold Stone Creamery	Consumer services	Restaurant	Scottsdale	1988	Ice cream parlor	P	A
Cruise America	Consumer services	Specialized consumer services	Mesa	1972	Recreational vehicle rental and sales	P	A
DDC-I	Technology	Software	Scottsdale	1985	Real-time operating system developer	P	A
Desert Financial Credit Union	Financials	Banks	Phoenix	1939	Financial services	P	A
Discount Tire	Consumer services	Specialty retailers	Scottsdale	1960	Tire retailer	P	A
DriveTime	Consumer services	Specialty retailers	Tempe	2002	Auto dealer	P	A
Everspin Technologies	Technology	Semiconductors	Chandler	2008	MRAM memory products	P	A
Fender	Consumer goods	Recreational products	Scottsdale	1946	Musical instruments	P	A
First Solar	Industrials	Electrical components & equipment	Tempe	1999	Photovoltaic manufacturer	P	A
Four Peaks Brewery	Consumer goods	Brewers	Tempe	1996	Brewery	P	A
Freeport-McMoRan	Basic materials	Mining	Phoenix	1912	Metals and mining	P	A
Fry's Food and Drug	Consumer services	Food retailers & wholesalers	Tolleson	1954	Grocery stores	P	A
Fulton Homes	Consumer goods	Home construction	Tempe	1975	Homebuilder	P	A
GoDaddy	Technology	Internet	Tempe	1997	Domain registrar and web hosting	P	A
Grand Canyon Airlines	Industrials	Airlines	Tusayan	1927	Sightseeing and charter airline	P	A
Grand Canyon University	Consumer services	Specialized consumer services	Phoenix	1949	Education	P	A
Harkins Theatres	Consumer services	Recreational services	Scottsdale	1933	Movie theaters	P	A
Hensley & Co.	Consumer goods	Brewers	Phoenix	1955	Beverages	P	A
HonorHealth	Health care	Health care providers	Scottsdale	1927	Nonprofit health care network	P	A
Insight Enterprises	Technology	Software	Tempe	1988	Information technology	P	A
JDA Software	Technology	Software	Scottsdale	1985	Software	P	A
Kahala Brands	Consumer Services	Restaurants & bars	Scottsdale	1998	Fast-food franchisor	P	A
Keap	Technology	Software	Chandler	2001	Sales software	P	A
Knight-Swift Transportation	Industrials	Trucking	Phoenix	2017	Transportation	P	A
Kona Grill	Consumer services	Restaurants & bars	Scottsdale	1998	Restaurant chain	P	A
Leslie's Poolmart	Consumer services	Home improvement retailers	Phoenix	1963	Pool supplies retailer	P	A
Limelight Networks	Technology	Software	Tempe	2001	Content delivery network	P	A
Local Motors	Consumer goods	Automobiles	Phoenix	2007	Automotive manufacturing	P	A
Magellan Health	Healthcare	Healthcare providers	Scottsdale	1969	Managed healthcare	P	A
Massage Envy	Consumer services	Specialized consumer services	Scottsdale	2002	Massage services	P	A
Meritage Homes Corporation	Consumer goods	Home construction	Scottsdale	1985	Home construction	P	A
Mesa Air Group	Transportation	Airline	Phoenix	1980	Regional airline	P	A
Microchip Technology	Technology	Semiconductors	Chandler	1989	Semiconductors	P	A
Mobile Mini	Industrials	Containers & packaging	Phoenix	1983	Portable storage	P	A
Namecheap	Technology	Internet	Phoenix	2000	Domain registrar and web hosting	P	A
Nextiva	Telecommunications	Fixed line telecommunications	Scottsdale	2008	Cloud communications and customer experience software	P	A
NortonLifeLock	Financials	Financial services	Tempe	1982	Fraud detection	P	A
ON Semiconductor	Technology	Semiconductors	Phoenix	1999	Semiconductors	P	A
OneAZ Credit Union	Financials	Banks	Phoenix	1951	Credit unions and financial services	P	A
OnTrac	Industrials	Delivery services	Chandler	1991	Package delivery	P	A
Osaic	Financials	Investment services	Scottsdale	2002	Wealth management and brokerage services	P	A
P. F. Chang's China Bistro	Consumer services	Restaurants & bars	Scottsdale	1993	Restaurant chain	P	A
Parsons Xtreme Golf	Consumer goods	Recreational products	Scottsdale	2014	Sporting equipment	P	A
Peter Piper Pizza	Consumer services	Bars & restaurants	Phoenix	1973	Pizza restaurant chain	P	A
PetSmart	Consumer services	Specialty retailers	Phoenix	1986	Retail	P	A
PING	Consumer goods	Recreational products	Phoenix	1959	Sporting equipment	P	A
Pinnacle West Capital	Utilities	Conventional electricity	Phoenix	1985	Utility holding company	P	A
Reliance, Inc.	Basic materials	Iron & steel	Scottsdale	1939	Metals service center operator	P	A
Republic Services	Industrials	Waste & disposal Services	Phoenix	1998	Waste management	P	A
Resideo	Industrials	Electronic equipment	Scottsdale	2018	Home automation, security, and fire detection products	P	A
Rogers Corporation	Basic materials	Specialty materials	Chandler	1832	Engineered materials for electronics and industrial uses	P	A
Rural Metro	Business services	Emergency services	Scottsdale	1948	Firefighting services	P	A
Salt River Project	Utilities	Alternative electricity	Tempe	1903	Utility	S	A
Shamrock Farms	Consumer goods	Farming & fishing	Phoenix	1922	Farm collective	P	A
Sprouts Farmers Market	Consumer services	Food retailers & wholesalers	Phoenix	2002	Grocery stores	P	A
StandardAero	Industrials	Aerospace	Scottsdale	1911	Aircraft maintenance, repair, and overhaul	P	A
Swift Transportation	Industrials	Trucking	Phoenix	1966	Merged with Knight Transportation to form Knight-Swift Transportation in 2017	P	D
Taylor Morrison	Consumer goods	Home construction	Scottsdale	2007	Home construction	P	A
Tilted Kilt Pub & Eatery	Consumer services	Restaurants & bars	Tempe	2003	Restaurant chain	P	A
TriWest Healthcare Alliance	Health care	Health care providers	Phoenix	1996	Health benefit management	P	A
U-Haul	Consumer services	Specialized consumer services	Phoenix	1945	Transportation and storage rentals	P	A
Universal Technical Institute	Consumer services	Specialized consumer services	Scottsdale	1965	Education	P	A
Versum Materials	Industrials	Manufacturing	Tempe	2016	Chemicals production	P	A
Viad	Business services	Marketing	Phoenix	1996	Live event organizer	P	A
Viavi Solutions	Technology	Telecommunications equipment	Chandler	2015	Network test, measurement, and optical technology	P	A
Walbro	Industrials	Manufacturing	Tucson	1950	Vehicle components manufacturing	P	A
WebPT	Technology	Software	Phoenix	2008	Rehabilitation therapy software	P	A
Western Alliance Bancorporation	Financials	Banks	Phoenix	1994	Regional bank holding company	P	A

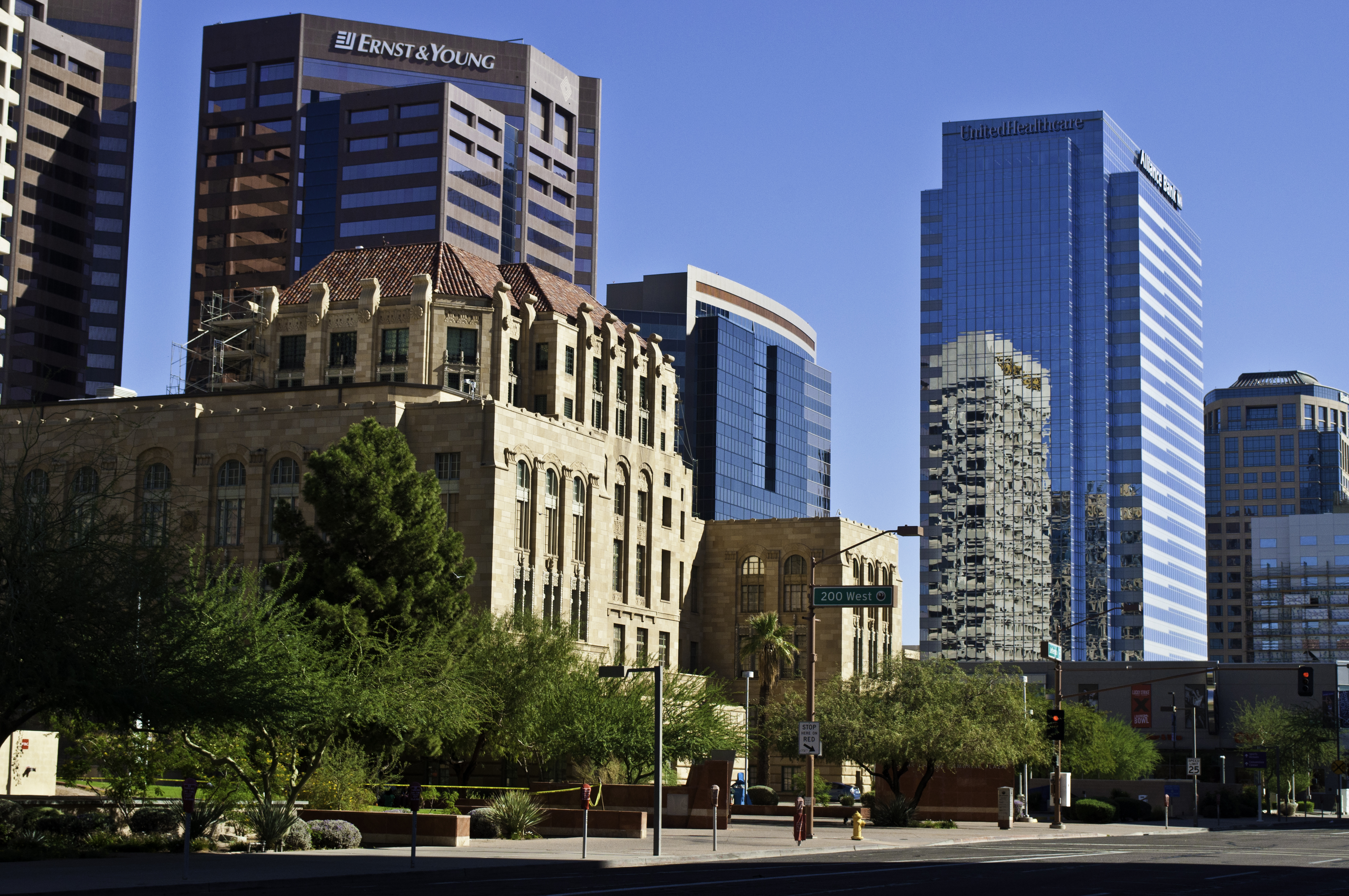
Downtown Phoenix, Arizona

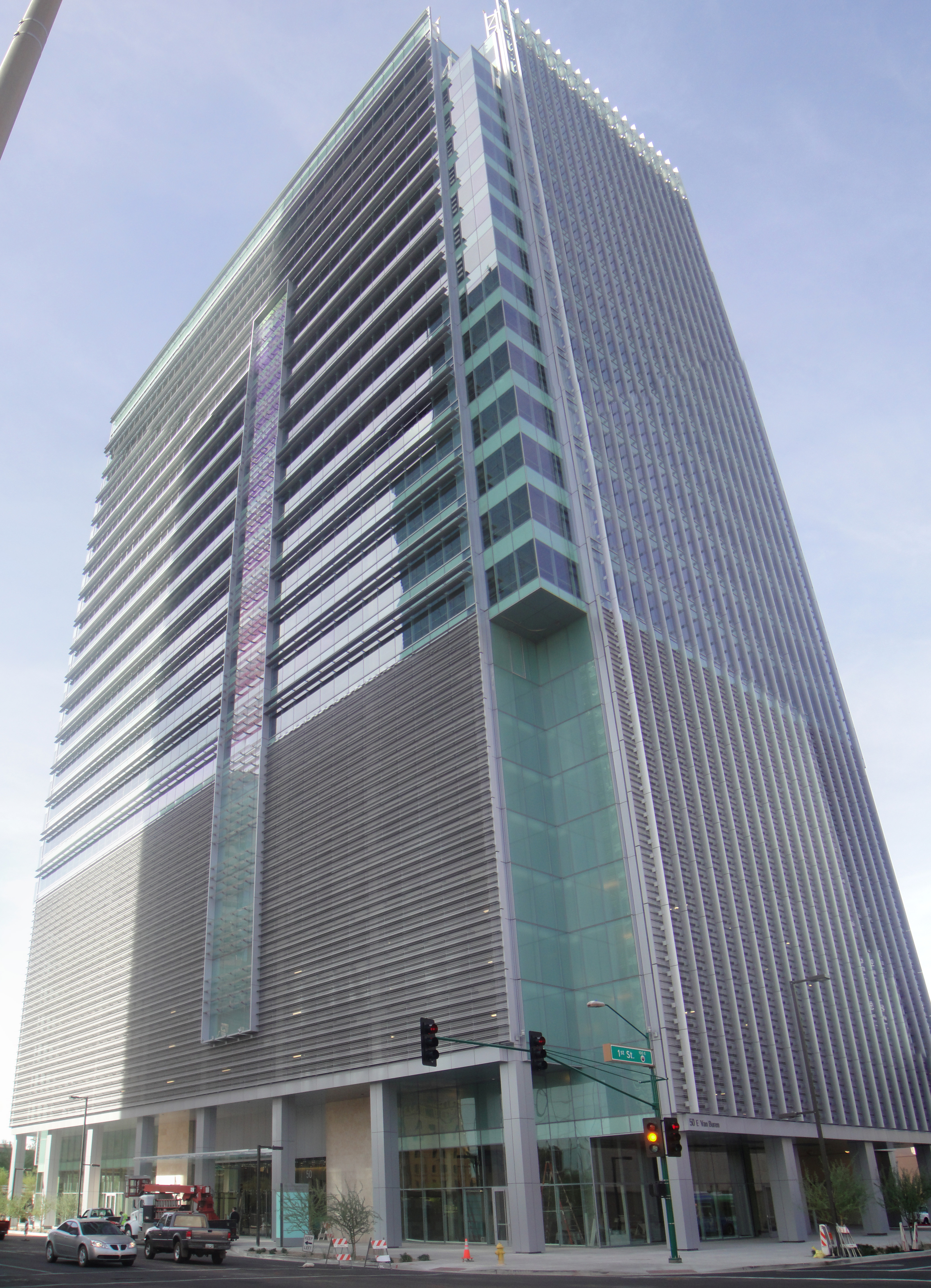
Freeport-McMoRan mining headquarters at the Freeport-McMoRan Center

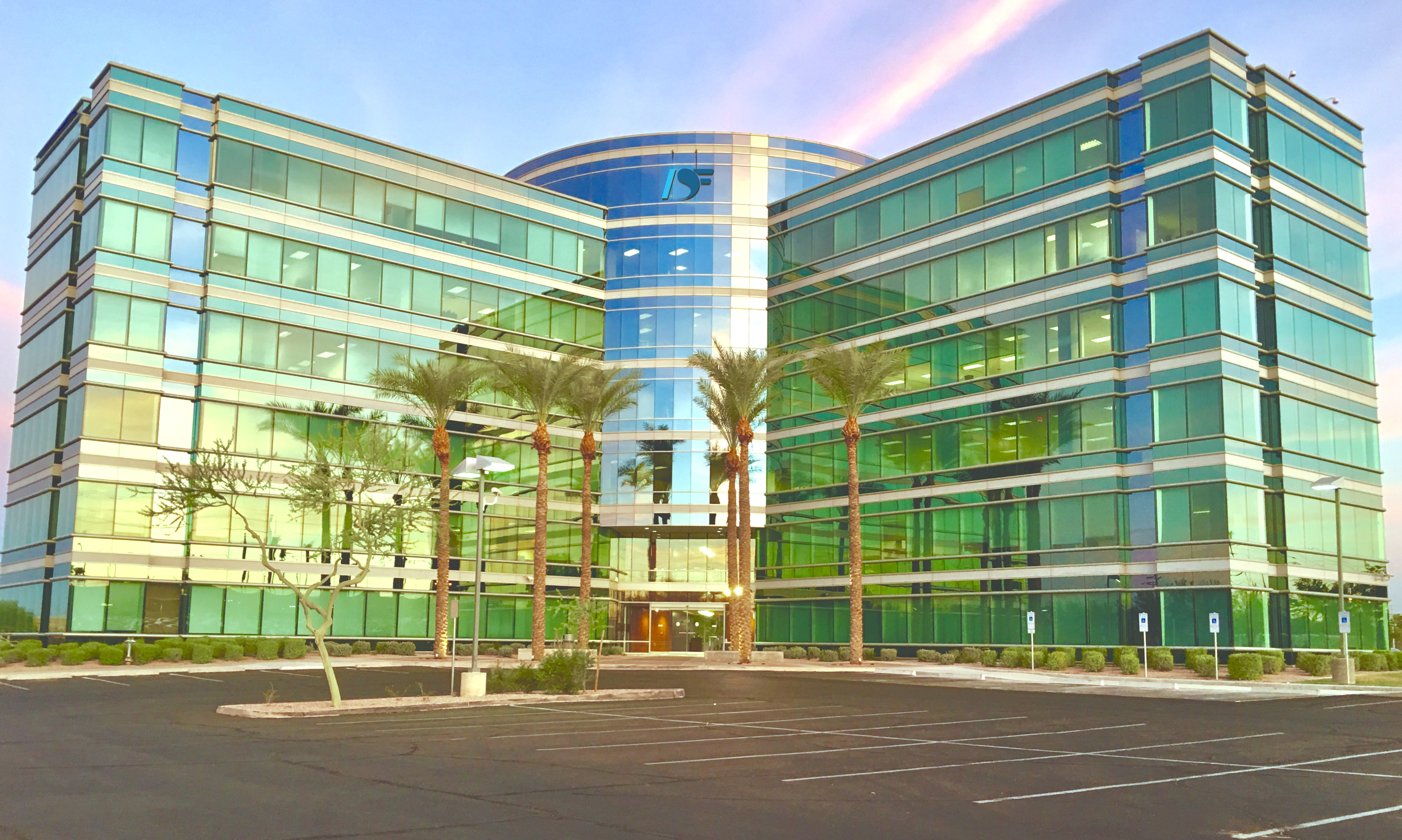
Desert Financial Credit Union headquarters in Phoenix

== See also ==
- List of corporations in Phoenix
- List of companies of the United States by state
- Copper mining in Arizona
- Silver mining in Arizona
