= List of corporations in the Phoenix metropolitan area =

This is a list of companies based or having major operations in the Phoenix metropolitan area.

== Fortune 100 ==
2020 listings:

- Wal-Mart (1)
- Amazon.com (2)
- UnitedHealth Group (7)
- Costco Wholesale (14)
- Cardinal Health (16)
- JPMorgan Chase (17)
- Walgreens Boots Alliance (19)
- Verizon Communications (20)
- Bank of America (25)
- Home Depot (26)
- Wells Fargo (30)
- State Farm (36)
- Target (37)
- United Parcel Service (43)
- Lowe's (44)
- Intel (45)
- FedEx (47)
- American International Group (66)
- American Express (67)
- Delta Air Lines (68)
- Allstate (72)
- Nationwide Insurance (74)
- Best Buy (75)
- Coca-Cola (88)
- Honeywell International (92)

== Fortune 500 ==
- Avnet (169)
- Freeport-McMoRan (221)
- Republic Services (305)
- PetSmart (386)
- Insight Enterprises (409)
- Magellan Health (432)

== Fortune 1000 ==
- Sprouts Farmers Market (502)
- ON Semiconductor (512)
- Microchip Technology (522)
- Carlisle Companies (563)
- Taylor Morrison (567)
- NortonLifeLock (573)
- Carvana (651)
- Amkor Technology (639)
- Knight-Swift Transportation (679)
- Pinnacle West Capital Corporation (701)
- First Solar (770)
- GoDaddy (787)
- Benchmark Electronics (930)

General Dynamics and Subsidiaries Northrop Grumman

== NLJ 250 law firms ==
- Ballard Spahr (76)
- Snell & Wilmer (104)
- Lewis and Roca (213)
- Fennemore Craig (220)

== Other significant corporate headquarters and franchisors ==
- Amkor Technology (Tempe)
- Apollo Education Group (Phoenix)
- Arizona Federal Credit Union (Phoenix)
- Arizona Public Service (Phoenix)
- Arizona Republic (Phoenix)
- Axon (Scottsdale)
- Banner Health (Phoenix)
- Bashas' Supermarkets (Chandler)
- Best Western (Phoenix)
- Cable One (Phoenix)
- Casino Arizona (Scottsdale)
- Choice Hotels (Scottsdale)
- Circle K (Tempe)
- Cold Stone Creamery (Scottsdale)
- DDC-I (Phoenix)
- Desert Schools Federal Credit Union (Phoenix)
- Dillon Aero (Scottsdale)
- Discount Tire (Scottsdale)
- DriveTime (Phoenix)
- Fender Musical Instruments Corporation (Scottsdale)
- Forever Living Products (Scottsdale)
- FreeLife (Phoenix)
- Four Peaks Brewery (Tempe)
- Fry's Food and Drug (Tolleson)
- Fulton Homes (Tempe)
- Grand Canyon University (Phoenix)
- Harkins Theatres (Scottsdale)
- Hensley & Co. (Phoenix)
- JDA Software Group (Scottsdale)
- Kahala Brands (Scottsdale)
- Keap (Chandler)
- Kona Grill (Scottsdale)
- Leslie's Swimming Pool Supplies (Phoenix)
- Limelight Networks (Tempe)
- Massage Envy (Scottsdale)
- Meritage Homes Corporation (Scottsdale)
- Mesa Air Group (Phoenix)
- Microchip Technology (Chandler)
- Mobile Mini (Tempe)
- ON Semiconductor (Phoenix)
- OnTrac (Chandler)
- P.F. Chang's China Bistro (Scottsdale)
- Peter Piper Pizza (Phoenix)
- Ping Golf (Phoenix)
- Pure Flix Entertainment (Scottsdale)
- Rural Metro (Scottsdale)
- Salt River Project (Phoenix)
- Shamrock Farms (Phoenix)
- Tilted Kilt (Tempe)
- U-Haul (Phoenix)
- Universal Technical Institute (Phoenix)
- Versum Materials (Tempe)
- Viad (Phoenix)
- Western Alliance Bancorporation (Phoenix)

== Other corporations with significant operations ==
- Alaska Airlines - commercial airline
- Albertsons - retail
- Amazon.com - online retailing
- American Airlines - commercial airline
- Applied Materials - semiconductors
- Alliant Techsystems Inc. - aerospace
- Boeing - aerospace and defense
- Centurylink - telecommunications
- Charles Schwab - financial services
- Cox Communications - telecommunications
- Dignity Health - healthcare
- Discover Card - financial services
- Edward Jones Investments - financial services
- Freescale Semiconductor - semiconductors
- General Dynamics C4 Systems - aerospace and defense
- GE Finance Franchise Corporation
- Home Depot - retail
- Honeywell International - conglomerate
- Humana - health care
- Hyundai Engineering (HEC) - engineering & construction services
- IBM - computer hardware
- Infusionsoft - software
- Intel - semiconductors
- Local Motors - automotive manufacturing
- Kroger - retail
- Marriott International - hospitality
- Mayo Clinic - health care
- Medtronic - medical equipment
- Motorola - telecommunications
- Northern Trust - financial services
- Opendoor - real estate
- PTI Securities & Futures
- PulteGroup - home construction
- Raytheon - aerospace and defense
- Safeway - retail
- Southwest Airlines - commercial airline
- State Farm - insurance
- Target Corporation - retail
- U.S. Foodservice - food industry
- USAA - financial services
- Vanguard Group - financial services
- Wal-Mart - retail
- Walgreens - retail
- Yelp, Inc. - sales
- ZipRecruiter - recruiting services

== See also ==
- List of Arizona companies
