= AFCU =

AFCU may refer to:

- America First Credit Union
- Arizona Financial Credit Union
- Arkansas Federal Credit Union
- Armed Forces Christian Union, a UK organisation of Christians in the military
- Association of Franciscan Colleges and Universities
