= Arizona Financial Theatre =

Performance venue in Phoenix, Arizona

Coordinates: 33°26′55″N 112°4′45″W

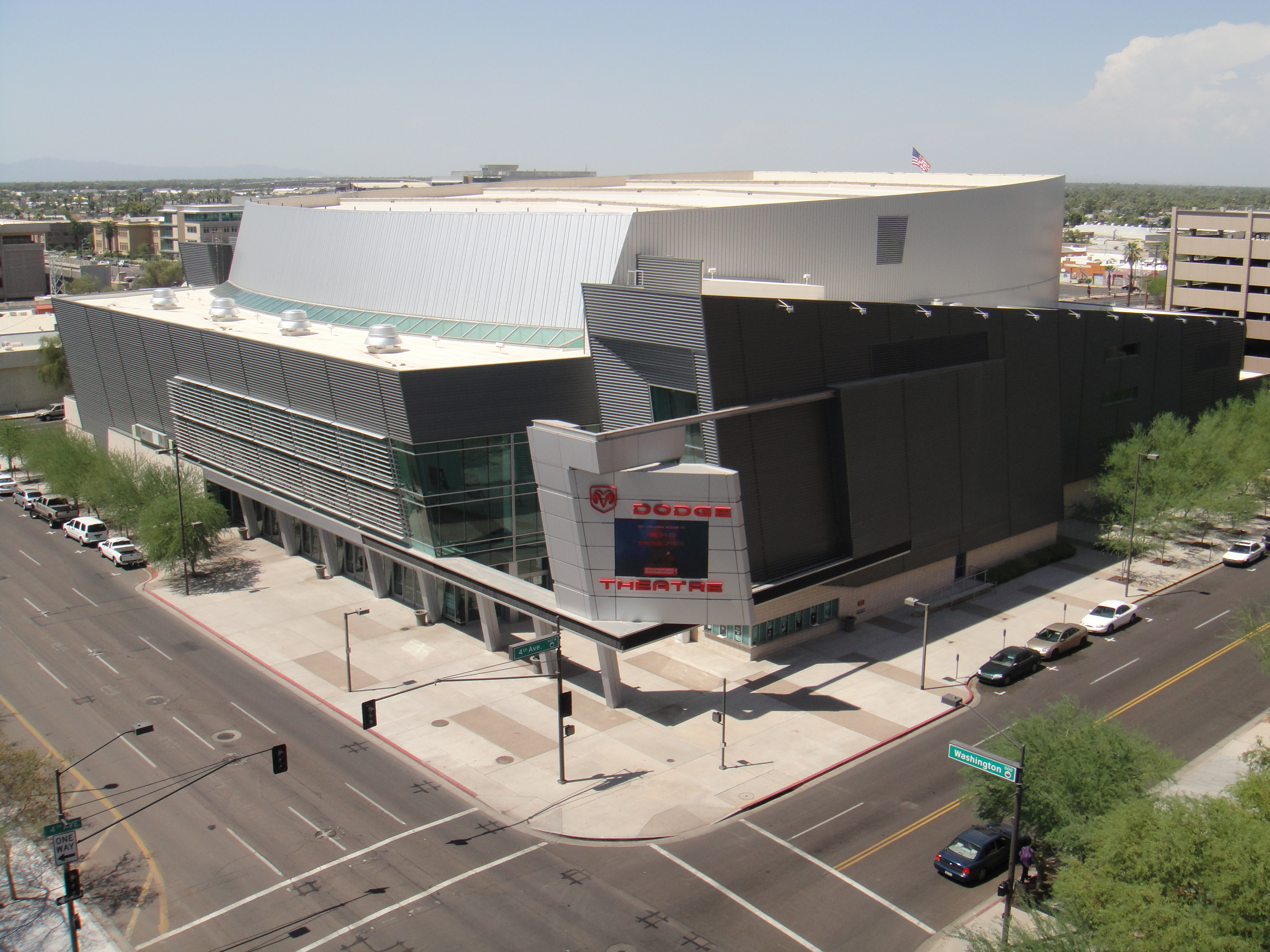
- Exterior view of the theatre (c.2009)
- Interactive map of Arizona Financial Theatre
- Former names: Dodge Theatre (2002–2010); Comerica Theatre (2010–2019); Arizona Federal Theatre (2019–2022)
- Address: 400 West Washington Street
- Location: Phoenix, Arizona, U.S.
- Owner: JDM Partners; City of Phoenix
- Operator: Phoenix Downtown Theatre LLC; Live Nation
- Capacity: 5,000

Construction
- Groundbreaking: September 2000
- Opened: April 11, 2002
- Architect: Dan Meis of NBBJ
- General contractor: CORE Construction

Website
- arizonafederaltheatre.com

The Arizona Financial Theatre (formerly known as the Dodge Theatre, the Comerica Theatre and the Arizona Federal Theatre) is a multi-use theatre in Downtown Phoenix, Arizona. The venue seats 5,000 people.

== History ==
Jerry Colangelo, longtime former owner of the Phoenix Suns and Arizona Diamondbacks, was one of the original investors. The facility, designed by Dan Meis of NBBJ, was designed to fill the need for performers that don't need a huge sports stadium, but are too large for the smaller, intimate venues.

Construction began in September 2000 with CORE Construction as general contractor. It opened in the spring of 2002 as part of the ongoing redevelopment efforts in Downtown Phoenix, and reached the 2 million mark in attendance in 2009. Live Nation began operating the venue in 2007. The theater's name was first changed in October 2010 after Comerica Bank acquired the naming rights.

On December 18, 2019, the theatre was renamed to Arizona Federal Theatre, as Arizona Federal Credit Union owned the naming rights. On July 11, 2022, the theatre was renamed once again to Arizona Financial Theatre after the rebranding of Arizona Federal Credit Union into Arizona Financial Credit Union.

== Events ==
The theatre was the stage for the comedy movie Blue Collar Comedy Tour: The Movie. In addition to this, George Lopez's most recent HBO Special, America's Mexican, was aired live at the venue. Rock group Chickenfoot recorded their live album Get Your Buzz On there and it also hosted the 2010 WWE Hall of Fame Induction Ceremony and the 2015 NFL Honors. It is also a venue for Broadway and family stage shows that play the Phoenix area, and in the theater's first few years the Arizona edition of the Radio City Christmas Spectacular took place at the venue.
