= Ontraport =

- Industry: Small business software
- Founded: 2006
- Founder: Landon Ray
- Headquarters: Santa Barbara, California, United States
- Key people: Landon Ray (CEO); Lena Requist (President); Pin Chen (Chief Technology Officer)
- Products: SaaS
- Services: Business software, CRM, Marketing automation, Web development, Email marketing, ECommerce, Landing Pages, Sales Force Management, Membership software, Affiliate marketing
- Revenue: $10+ million
- Number of employees: 40+
- Website: ontraport.com

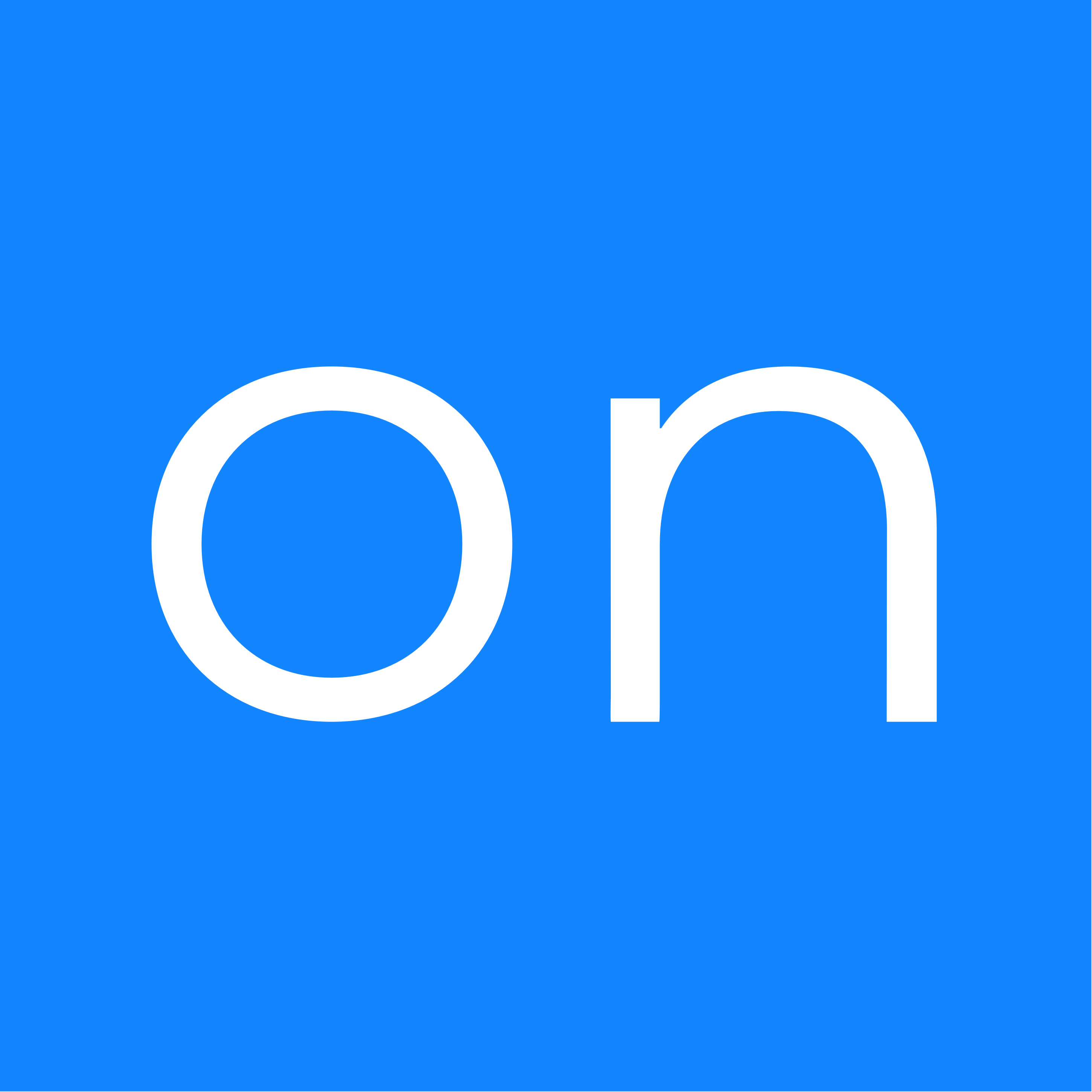
Ontraport logo

Ontraport is a "business automation software for entrepreneurs, solopreneurs and small businesses" that incorporates tools like CRM, marketing automation, ECommerce and reporting.

== Overview ==
Ontraport offers customer relations management services that help with content management, such as creating and hosting webpages; lead tracking, which includes collecting customer data and behavior; traditional marketing approaches, such as e-mail, SMS, social media, and direct mail; managing online payments, including automated billing; and workflow automation, such as for recruiting.

== History ==
Landon Ray, Pin Chen and Steven Schneider founded Ontraport in 2006 in Santa Barbara, California. The three started the small business automation platform from a backyard yurt and released Office AutoPilot (predecessor of Ontraport) in 2008.

== Company Overview ==
The company's headquarters is based in Covina, California and has 40+ employees.

== Software and Services ==
Ontraport offers a subscription-based sales and marketing software for small businesses and entrepreneurs. Features include business automation, campaign builder, CRM, ECommerce, email marketing, SMS and postcards, landing pages, marketing automation, marketing tracking, membership sites, metrics dashboard, partner program and sales force automation. All of the tools are centered around the visual campaign builder launched in 2017.
