= Meny Hoffman =

American businessman

Meny Hoffman is the chief executive officer of Ptex Group, an Inc. 500/5000-ranked marketing agency located in Brooklyn, NY, and a published business author. In 2010, he was honored with an Official Proclamation by Brooklyn Borough President Marty Markowitz for his work in encouraging entrepreneurism amongst New York businesses. He is an active member in the Brooklyn Chamber of Commerce.

In 2012, Hoffman delivered a live keynote presentation to over 3,000 people as a finalist at the InfusionCon (Infusionsoft) marketing automation conference in Phoenix, Arizona. He is also the founder of Let’s Talk Business, an email series that is sent to over 7,000 online subscribers each week, which discusses effective business strategies for growing businesses.

Hoffman collaborated on The Only Business Book You’ll Ever Need, a book on business and marketing strategy. He and his company have been featured in Crain’s Magazine, The Daily News, and the American Express OPEN Forum.
