= OnTrac Logistics, Inc. =

American logistics company

OnTrac Logistics
- Type: Private
- Industry: Logistics
- Predecessor: California Overnight
- Founded: 1991; 35 years ago in South San Francisco, California
- Successor: OnTrac
- Headquarters: Chandler, Arizona, United States
- Number of locations: 35 facilities, 633 drop boxes (2018)
- Key people: Robert E. Humphrey, Jr. (CEO)
- Services: Logistics
- Divisions: OnTrac (Overnight Division); OnTrac Messenger; OnTrac International
- Website: ontrac.com

OnTrac Logistics, Inc., was a privately held logistics company that contracted regional shipping services in the Western United States. In 2021, OnTrac Logistics was acquired by East Coast delivery firm LaserShip for $1.3 billion; the combined business's branding was later reverted to OnTrac.

== History ==
The company was founded in California in 1991 as California Overnight and was formed from acquisitions of several small Canadian and American courier companies and expanded to seven additional states: Arizona, Nevada, Oregon, Washington, Utah, Colorado and Idaho. Initial customers were document shippers who sought an alternative to overnight delivery in California versus national carriers.

In 2021, the Virginia-based company LaserShip acquired Ontrac Logistics to establish a national parcel delivery service to challenge FedEx and UPS, with the combined company being called "LaserShip/OnTrac." In 2022, LaserShip and OnTrac Logistics finished combining their networks and launched their e-commerce transcontinental parcel delivery service covering 74% of the U.S population, according to LaserShip Chief Commercial Officer Josh Dinneen.

In 2023, the two companies announced they would combine under the name OnTrac.

== Controversies ==
In 2014 OnTrac faced a class action lawsuit filed by Capstone Law APC on behalf of current and former drivers who worked for Express Messenger Systems, Inc. dba OnTrac (“OnTrac”) in a California location and were misclassified as independent contractors. The lawsuit alleged the multiple violations against OnTrac including willfully misclassifying employees as “exempt” from overtime and other protections under the Labor Code. The lawsuit was later settled out of court.

== See also ==
- Volumetric weight
- Logistics
