= Stamford Town Center =

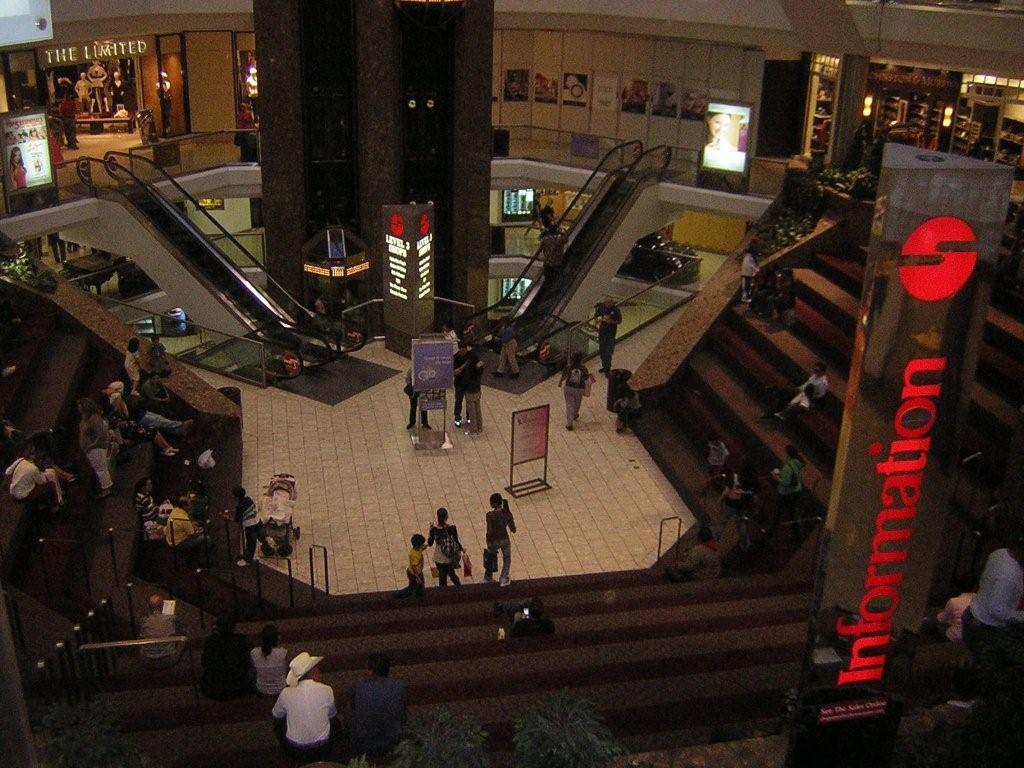
- The Grand Court of Stamford Town Center in 2006.
- Location: Stamford, Connecticut
- Coordinates: 41.053236°N 73.536242°W
- Opened: June 17, 1982
- Developer: F.D. Rich Co. Taubman Centers
- Owner: Stamford Town Center LLC
- Num. of anchor tenants: 3
- Floor area: 761,000 sq ft (70,700 m^{2})
- Public transit: 311, 312, 328, 333, 334, 341, 344
- Website: shopstamfordtowncenter.com

Stamford Town Center is an urban shopping mall located in Downtown Stamford, Connecticut. The 761,000-square-foot (70,700 m^{2}) mall is the eighth largest in Connecticut, with space for about 130 stores and restaurants. The mall's three anchors are a 250,000-square-foot (23,000 m^{2}) Macy's, Barnes and Noble, and Pickleball America. The latter opened in the nearly 80,000-square-foot (7,432 m^{2}) anchor space previously occupied by Saks OFF 5th in September 2023.

== History ==
=== Construction ===
Built by F.D. Rich Co and Taubman Centers, Stamford Town Center opened on June 17, 1982 as part of an urban renewal project and had been the location of tenement structures that once lined Greyrock Place, the street which is its primary address.

The mall was a significant part of Stamford's urban renewal efforts, and thus its construction was not without controversy. Upon the mall's opening, the city of Stamford reoriented nearby Bedford Street and Summer Street to be one-way, in order to make the mall more accessible via car, a move which harmed surrounding businesses. An opinion piece in the New York Times lamented the destruction of once lively housing complexes which hosted lower-income residences, which was done to make way for the mall.

=== Launch and success ===
The mall launched with two anchors: Macy's and J.C. Penney. Saks Fifth Avenue opened its store in the mall on March 12, 1983, and served as the mall's third anchor. From its opening, the mall was very popular and drew shoppers and tourists from as far as the New York City boroughs and even internationally, and was considered "one of the country's most successful malls" by the 1990s, despite stiff nearby competition. In July 1994, it was announced the mall's J.C. Penney would move out, and would be replaced by a Filene's.

=== 2000s redevelopment ===
In May 2006, the southern portion of the mall, along Tresser Boulevard, was demolished and redeveloped. The redevelopment of the former Filene's anchor emphasized being more pedestrian-friendly, and improving the nearby better streetscape. This portion of the mall, which included Filene's, was replaced with space for six new restaurants, and Connecticut's largest Barnes & Noble, the latter of which opened in 2008.

The initial opening of the Plaza (which included Barnes & Noble, H&M, California Pizza Kitchen, Così, Kona Grill, and P.F. Chang's) occurred on November 1, 2007. Mitchell's Fish Market opened on December 8, 2007, while the Capital Grille opened on February 25, 2008. Famous Dave's Bar-B-Que had planned to open in this new space, but pulled out of the project. Plan B Burger Bar opened on August 4, 2012.

=== Change in ownership ===
On October 23, 2020, Taubman sold the mall to furniture chain Safevieh.

== Filmography ==
- Scenes from a Mall featured scenes at the Stamford Town Center

== Anchors ==
- Macy's (250,000 sq ft, 23,000 m^{2}) – opened in 1982
- Barnes and Noble – opened in 2008
- Pickleball America - opened in September 2023

=== Former anchors ===
- JCPenney (160,000 sq ft, 15,000 m^{2}) – opened in 1982, closed in 1994
- Filene's (160,000 sq ft, 15,000 m^{2}) – opened in 1994, closed in 2005, demolished in 2006, in the former JCPenney Space
- Saks Fifth Avenue (78,000 sq ft, 7,200 m^{2}) – opened in 1983, closed in 2014, reopened as Saks Fifth Avenue OFF 5TH in 2015
- Saks Fifth Avenue OFF 5TH (78,000 sq ft, 7,200 m^{2}) – opened in 2015, closed in 2021, relocated to the old Lord & Taylor store at High Ridge Road in 2022

== Gallery ==
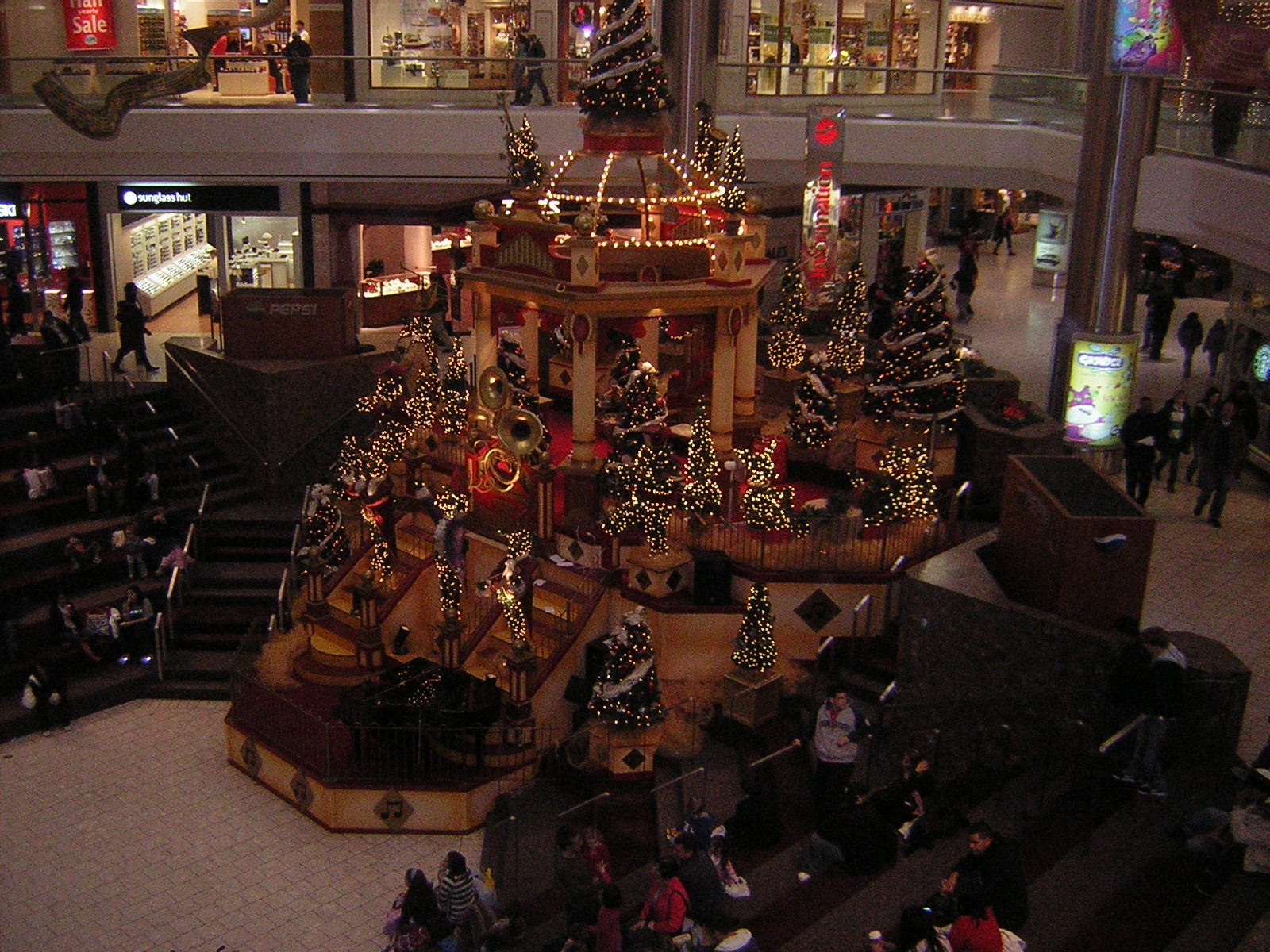
Inside the Stamford Town Center during the 2007 holidays.

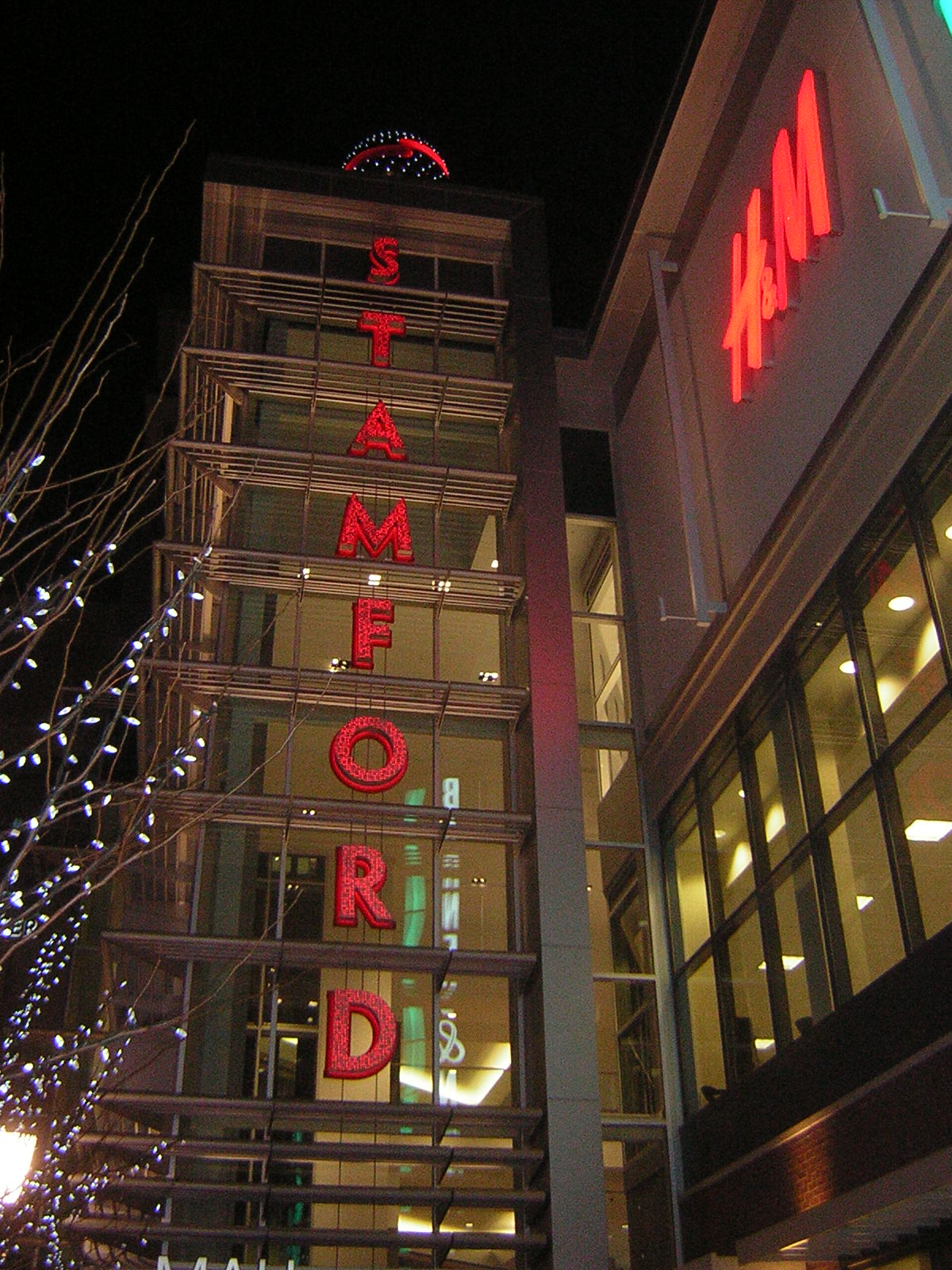
The Plaza at the Stamford Town Center. H&M (closed in 2020) is shown here.

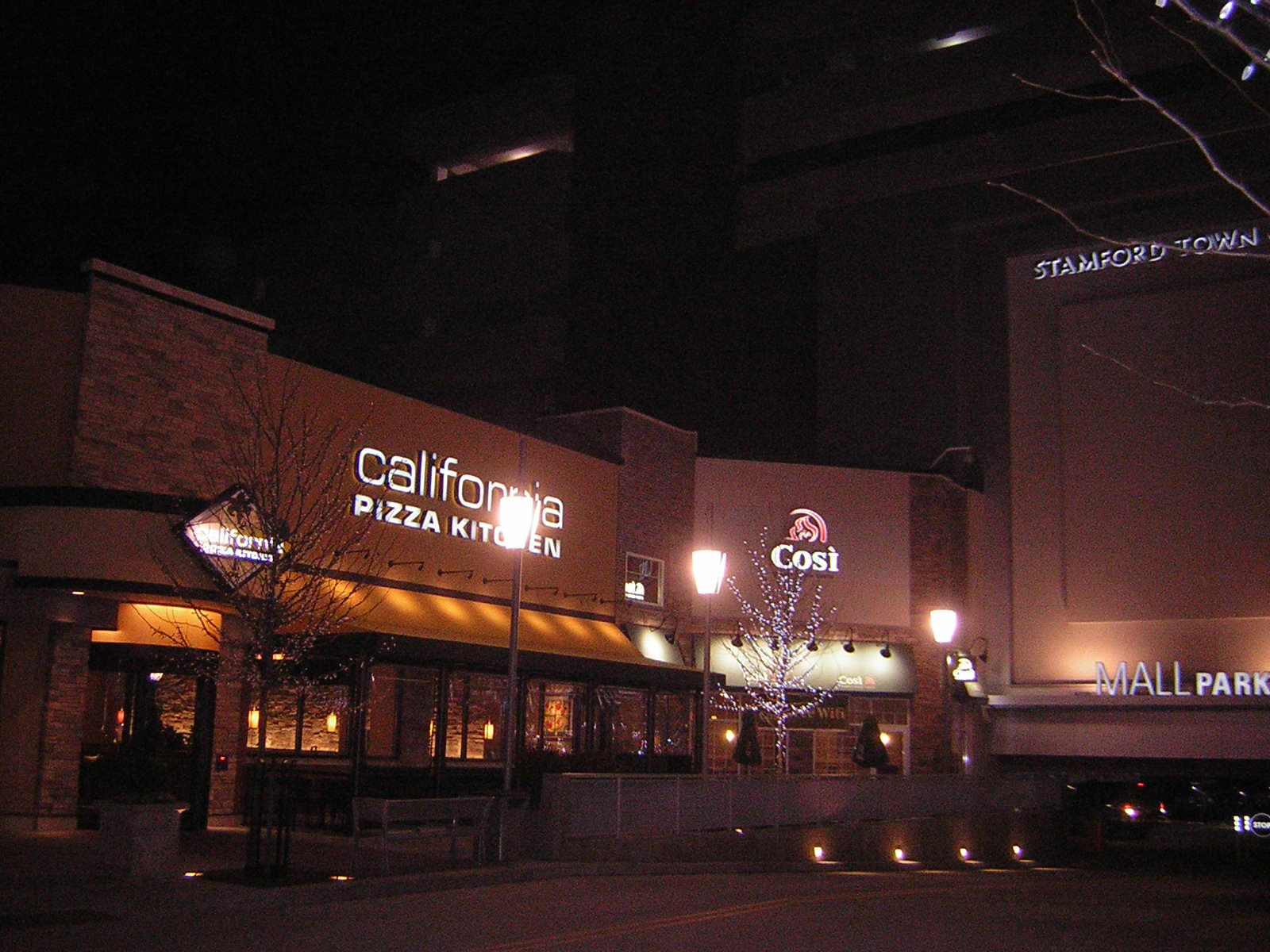
The Plaza at the Stamford Town Center. California Pizza Kitchen (closed in 2018) and Così (closed in 2016).

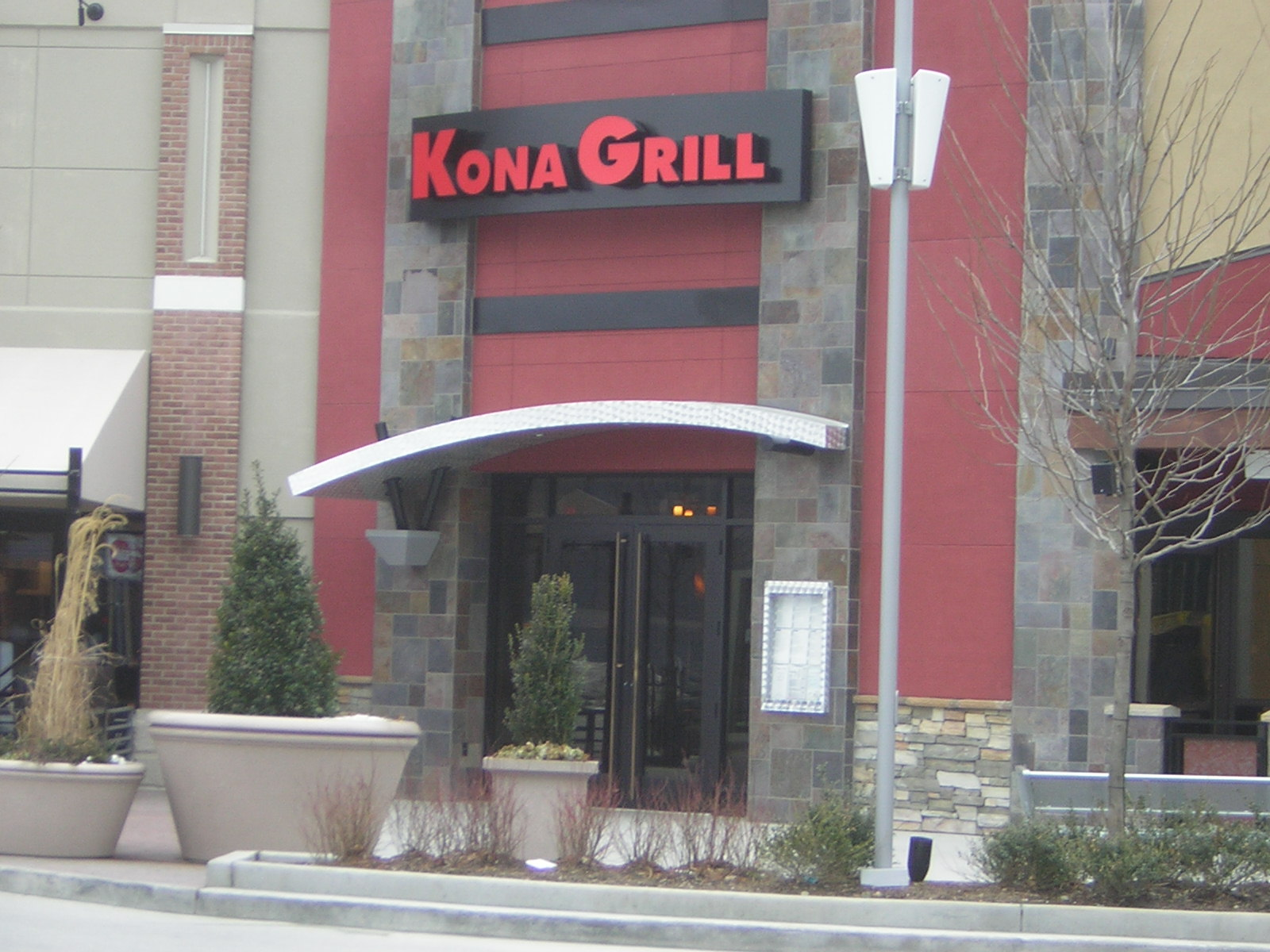
Kona Grill at The Plaza at Stamford Town Center (closed in 2019).

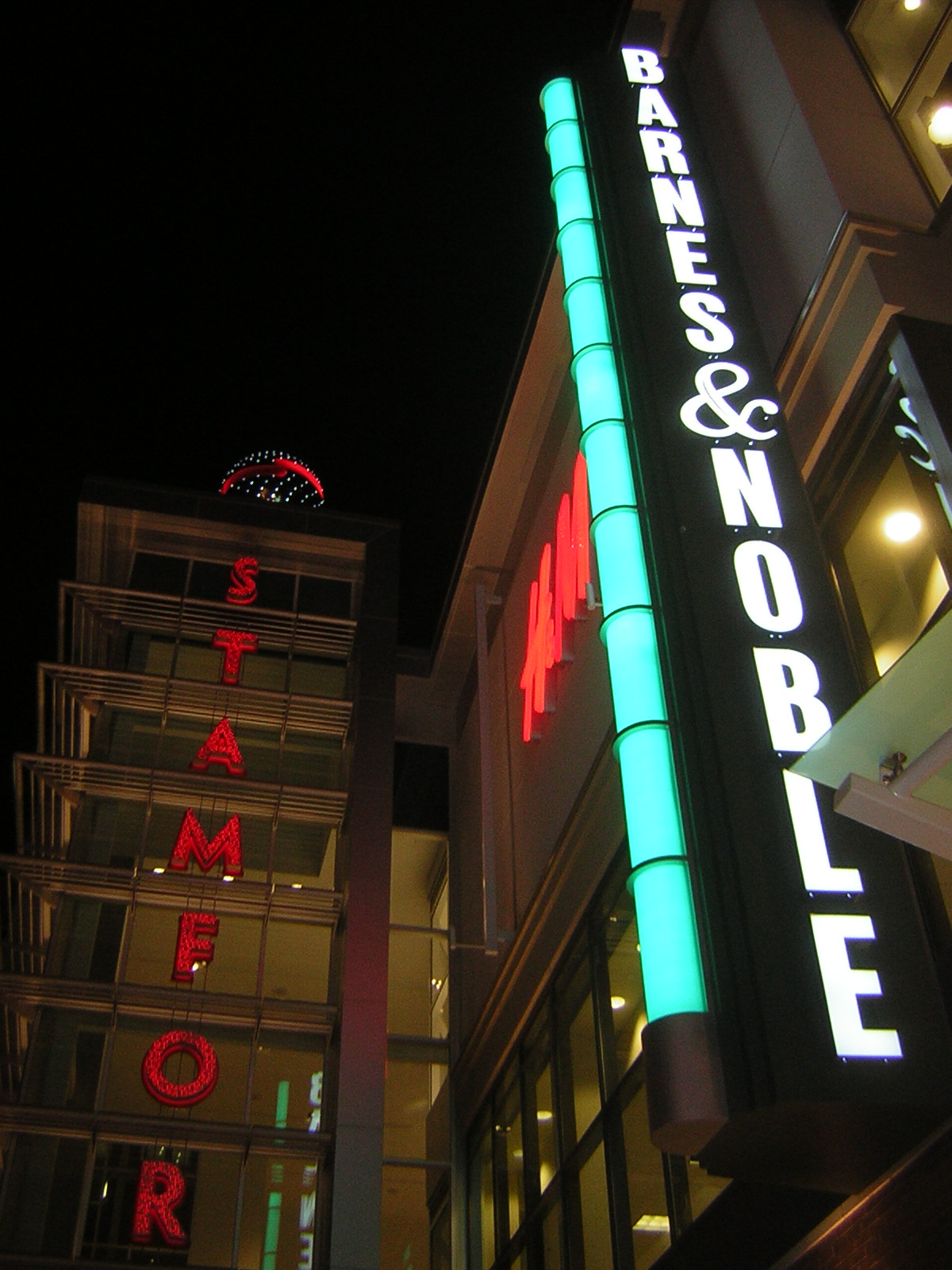
The Largest Barnes & Noble in Connecticut.

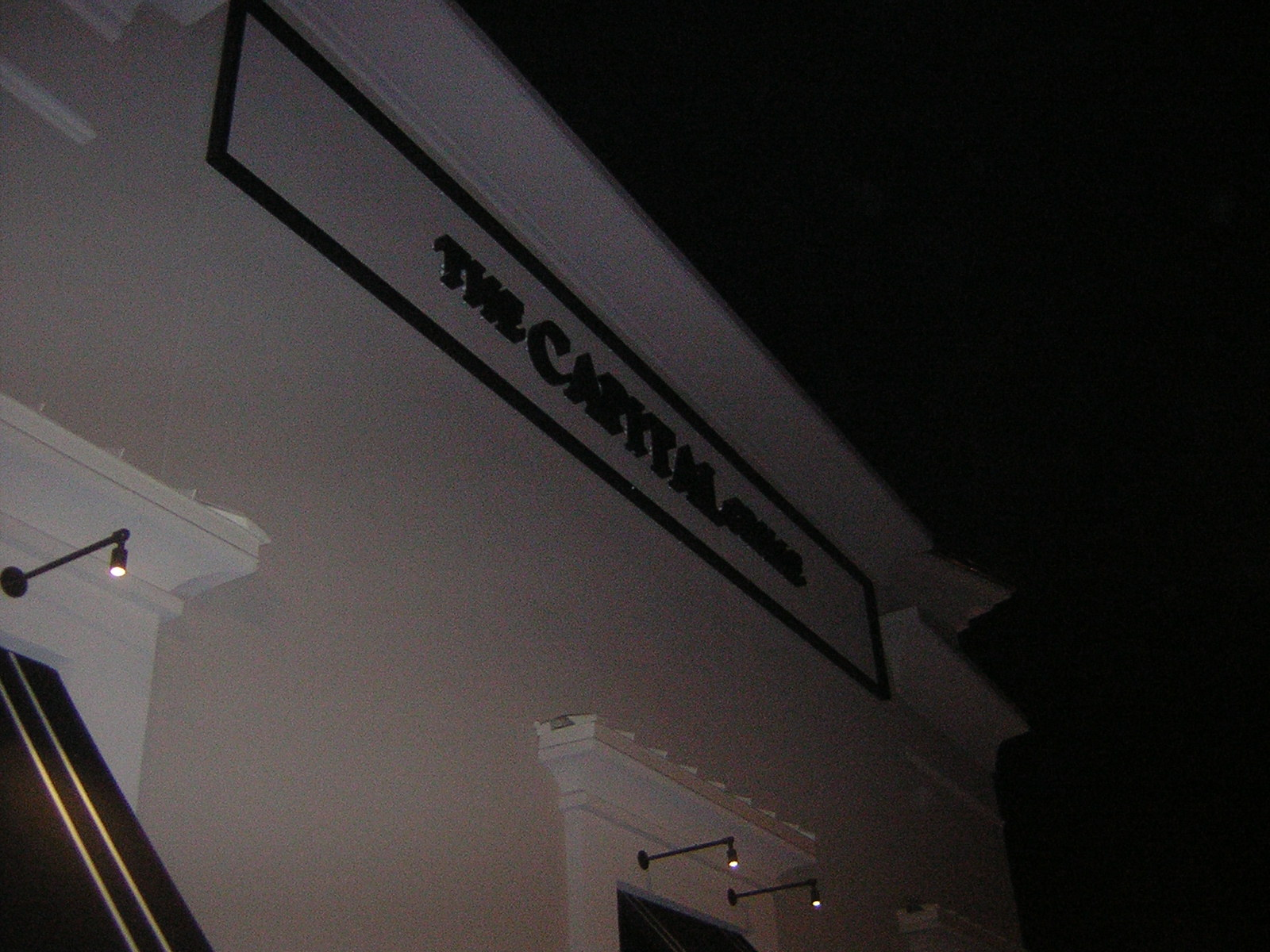
The Capital Grille.

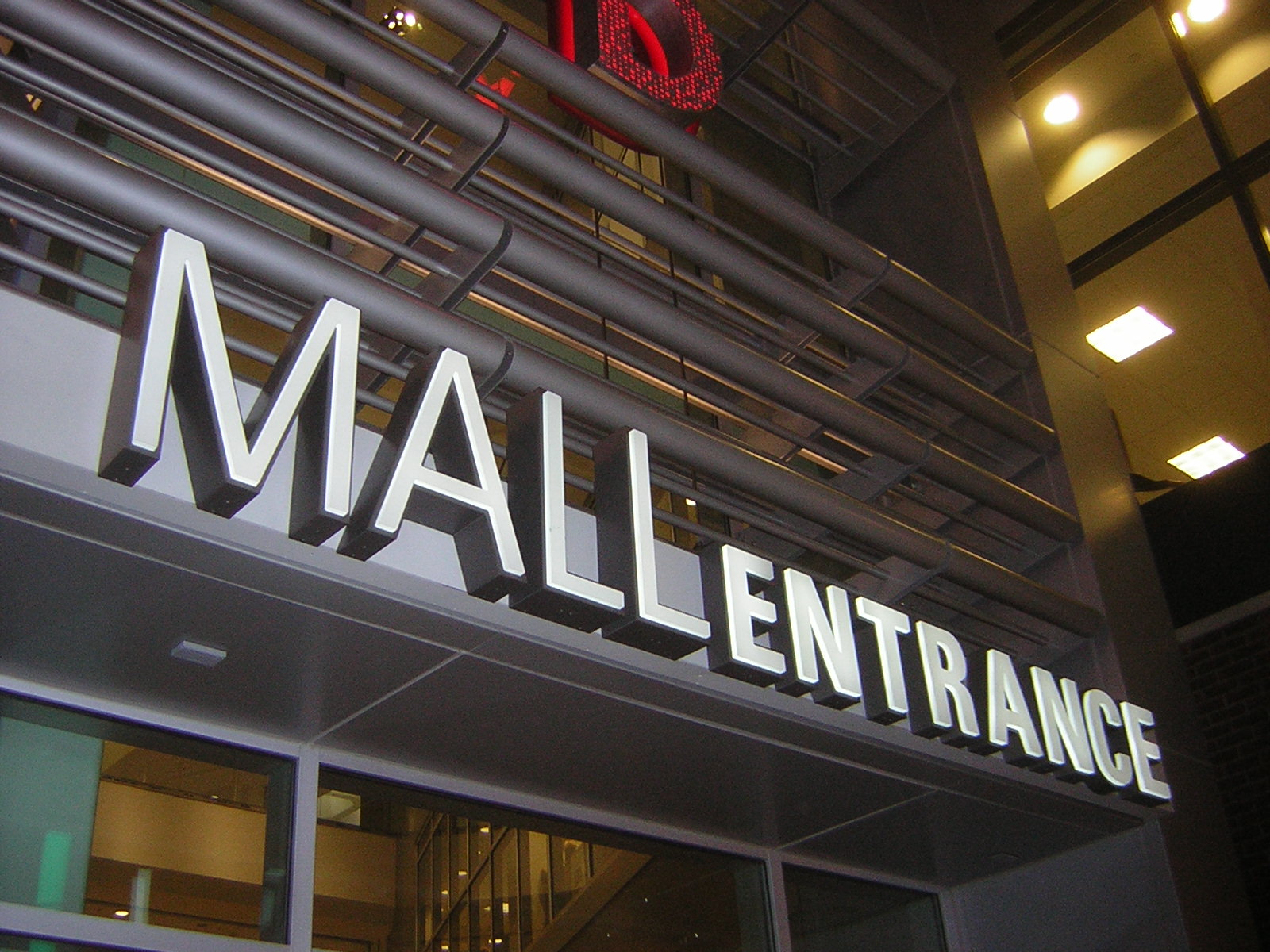
The entrance to the main mall from the Plaza.
