= Desert Financial Arena =

Multi-purpose arena in Tempe, Arizona

- The Desert, The Well (Former)
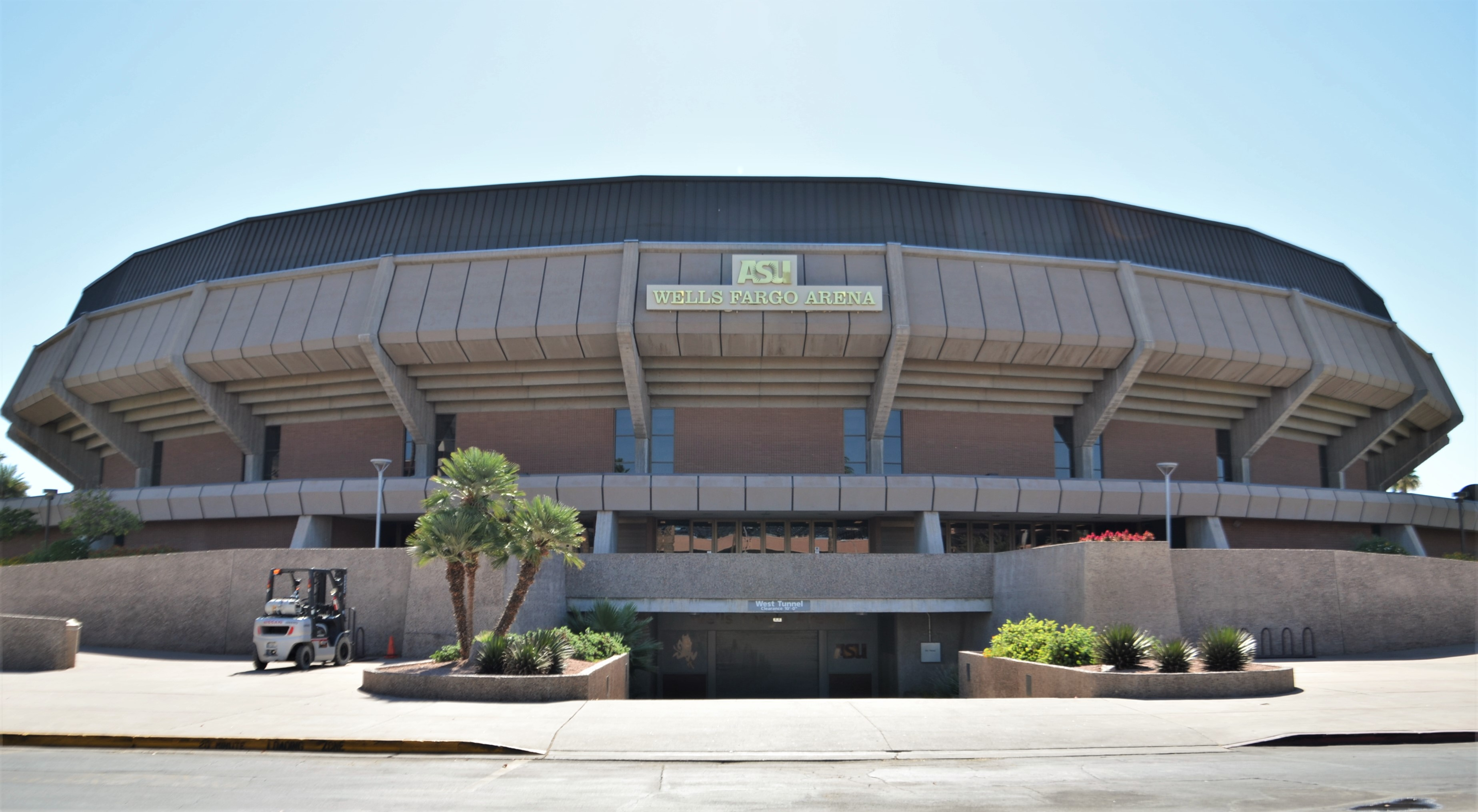
- 2014

- Location in Arizona Location in the United States
- Former names: ASU Activity Center (1974–97); Wells Fargo Arena (1997–2019)
- Address: 600 E Veterans Way
- Location: Tempe, Arizona, United States
- Coordinates: 33.424524°N 111.930948°W
- Owner: Arizona State University
- Capacity: 14,198
- Public transit: Veterans Way/College Ave

Construction
- Groundbreaking: 1972
- Opened: April 29, 1974
- Cost: $8 million ($61.6 million in 2025 dollars)
- Architect: Drover, Welch & Lindlan, Inc.
- General contractor: Olson Construction Company

Tenants
- Arizona State Sun Devils men's basketball (NCAA) (1974–present); Arizona State Sun Devils women's basketball Arizona State Sun Devils women's volleyball

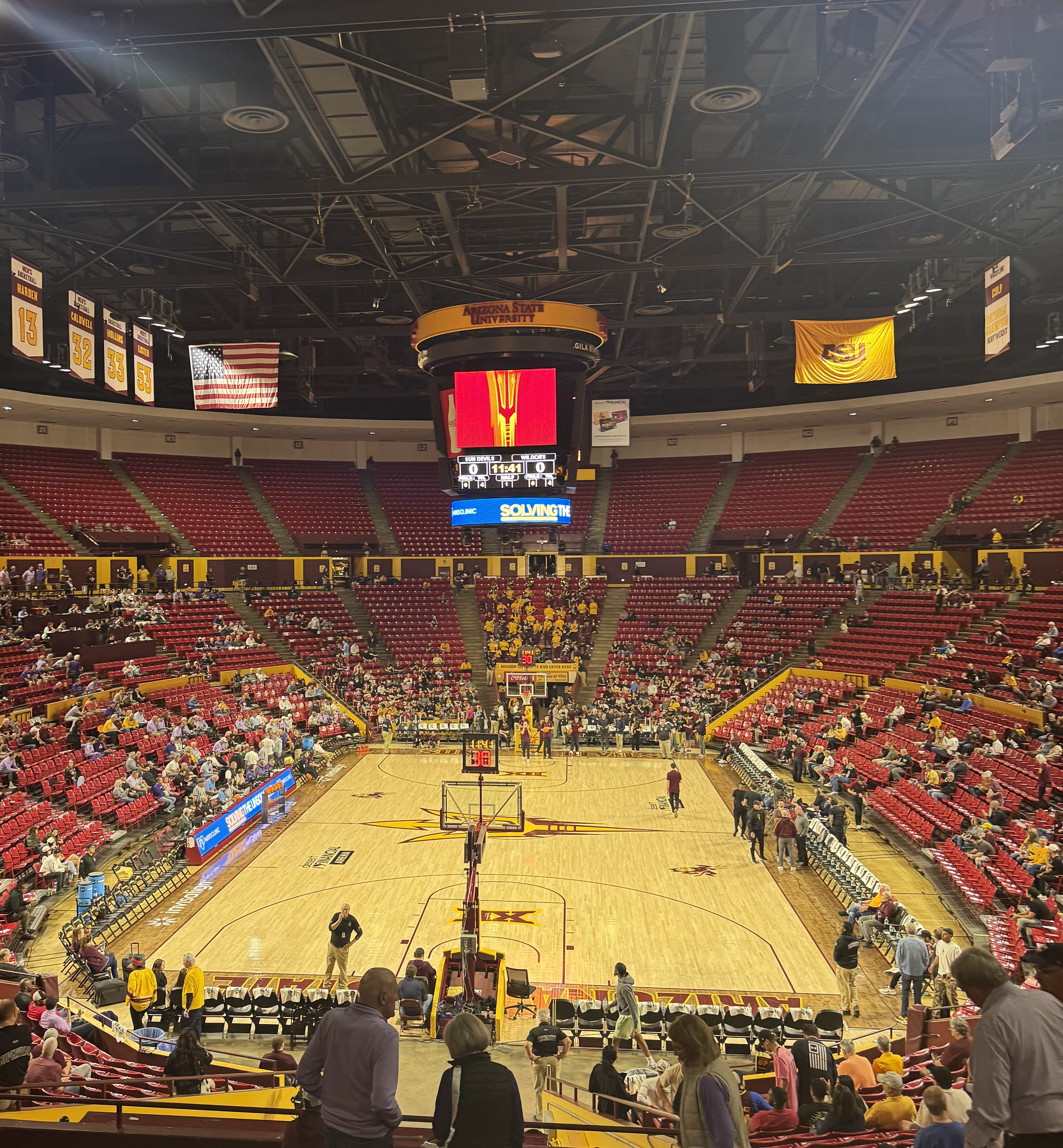
Interior of Desert Financial Arena before a game between Arizona State and Kansas State, February 4, 2025

Desert Financial Arena (formerly ASU Activity Center and Wells Fargo Arena) is a 14,198-seat multi-purpose arena located at 600 E Veterans Way in Tempe, Arizona, United States, in the Phoenix metropolitan area. It sits immediately east of Mountain America Stadium on the northern edge of the Tempe campus of Arizona State University (ASU).

Constructed in the spring of 1974 as the University Activity Center (or the "You-Ack") and at the cost of $8 million, it is the home of men's basketball, women's basketball, and women's volleyball and former home of women's gymnastics and men's wrestling. The facility also plays host to graduation ceremonies and a variety of concerts and shows. The building replaced Sun Devil Gym as the primary arena for the Sun Devils' basketball team.

The former naming rights for the arena were purchased by Wells Fargo & Co. in 1997. The current naming rights for the arena were purchased by Desert Financial Credit Union in 2019 for $1.5 million for 5 years.

== Design ==
The structure is 403 feet (123 m) long, 340 feet (100 m) wide and six stories high. The structure contains offices and locker rooms for men's basketball, women's basketball, women's volleyball, and the men's and women's track and field team, along with a weight room, coaches and film rooms, and an equipment room.

In 2010, a temporary wall was placed on the upper bowl, reducing the arena's capacity from 13,947 to 10,754 due to the lack of fans attending games. In 2018, due to the success of the men's basketball team, the wall was removed, increasing the capacity to 14,100.

== Events ==
Bruce Springsteen & the E Street Band performed at the arena on November 5, 1980 during the River Tour. Video and audio of the show were released in 2015 in conjunction with the band's The Ties That Bind commemorative box set, and their performance of "Badlands" was included on 1986's Live 1975–85 album.

U2 performed the first two dates of 1987's The Joshua Tree Tour at the arena on April 2 and 4. The band was originally scheduled to perform the night of April 3 instead of 4, but frontman Bono had partially lost his voice due to an accident involving a spotlight during tour rehearsals while performing Bullet the Blue Sky, which resulted in his chin being cut open. Thus, the second night's show was held off one day while he could rest and heal.

The arena hosted the 1st and 2nd rounds of the NCAA Women's Basketball Tournament in both 2015 and 2016.

== See also ==
- List of NCAA Division I basketball arenas
