= Nextiva =

Arizona-based American company

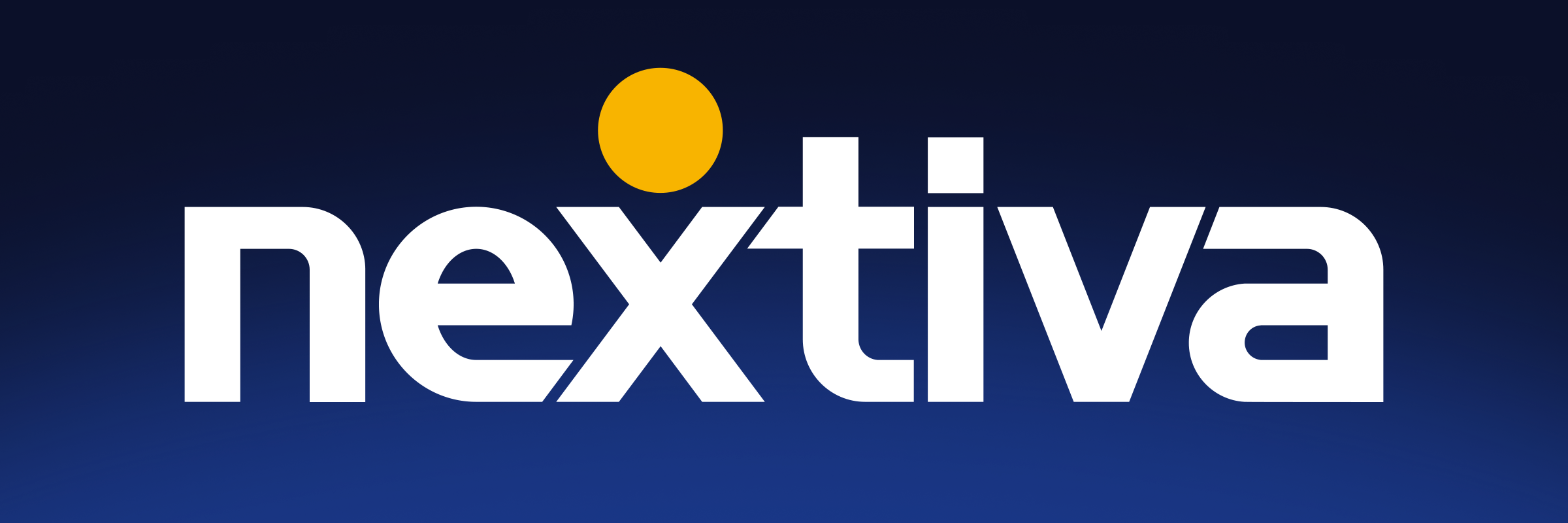

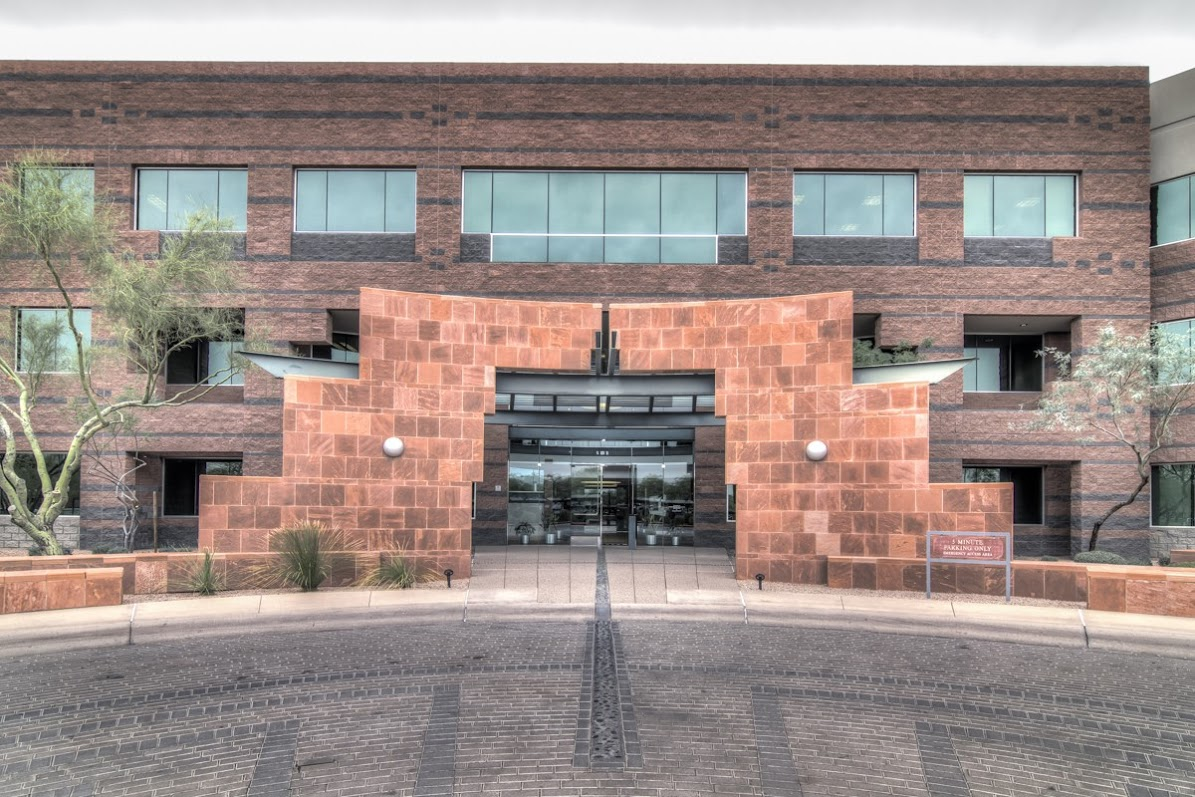
- Entrance of Nextiva in Scottsdale, Arizona
- Company type: Private
- Industry: Customer Experience Management
- Founded: 2008
- Headquarters: Scottsdale, Arizona, United States
- Key people: Tomas Gorny (CEO)
- Revenue: ▲$350 Million (2024)
- Number of employees: 1000+ (2023)
- Website: https://nextiva.com

Nextiva is a customer experience management (CXM) company based in Scottsdale, Arizona. Nextiva focuses on the area of cloud-based communication Nextiva indicates its telephone and other technology services are currently used by 150,000 businesses.

== History ==
Nextiva was founded in 2006. Six years later, Nextiva had approximately one hundred and twenty workers. According to Deloitte, Nextiva's growth rate in 2014 was estimated to be 1548%. By June 2016, Nextiva's revenue was close to $100 million. In January 2017, they had sales of $110 million and a staff of 700. As of 2020, Nextiva had a revenue of $200 million.

At the end of 2022, the company laid off 14% of their work force.

In 2024, Nextiva began developing its operations in India.

== Product line ==
Nextiva produces a unified communication platform called NextOS. The access to the platform is provided by subscription. NextOS is available as the desktop application in WindowsOS and MacOS, as well as mobile application for Android and iOS.

NextOS renders the services of cloud-based communication, CRM, videoconferencing, mail service, analytics, screen sharing, AI and machine learning. The platform integrates with Outlook, Google Cloud products, QuickBooks, DropBox and ZenDesk.
