= Kona Grill =

US multinational restaurant chain

Kona Grill Inc.
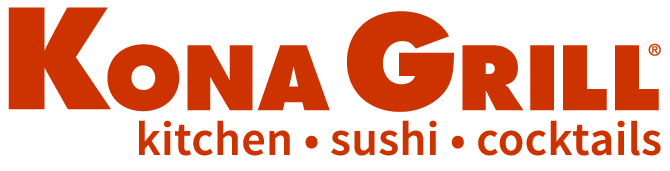

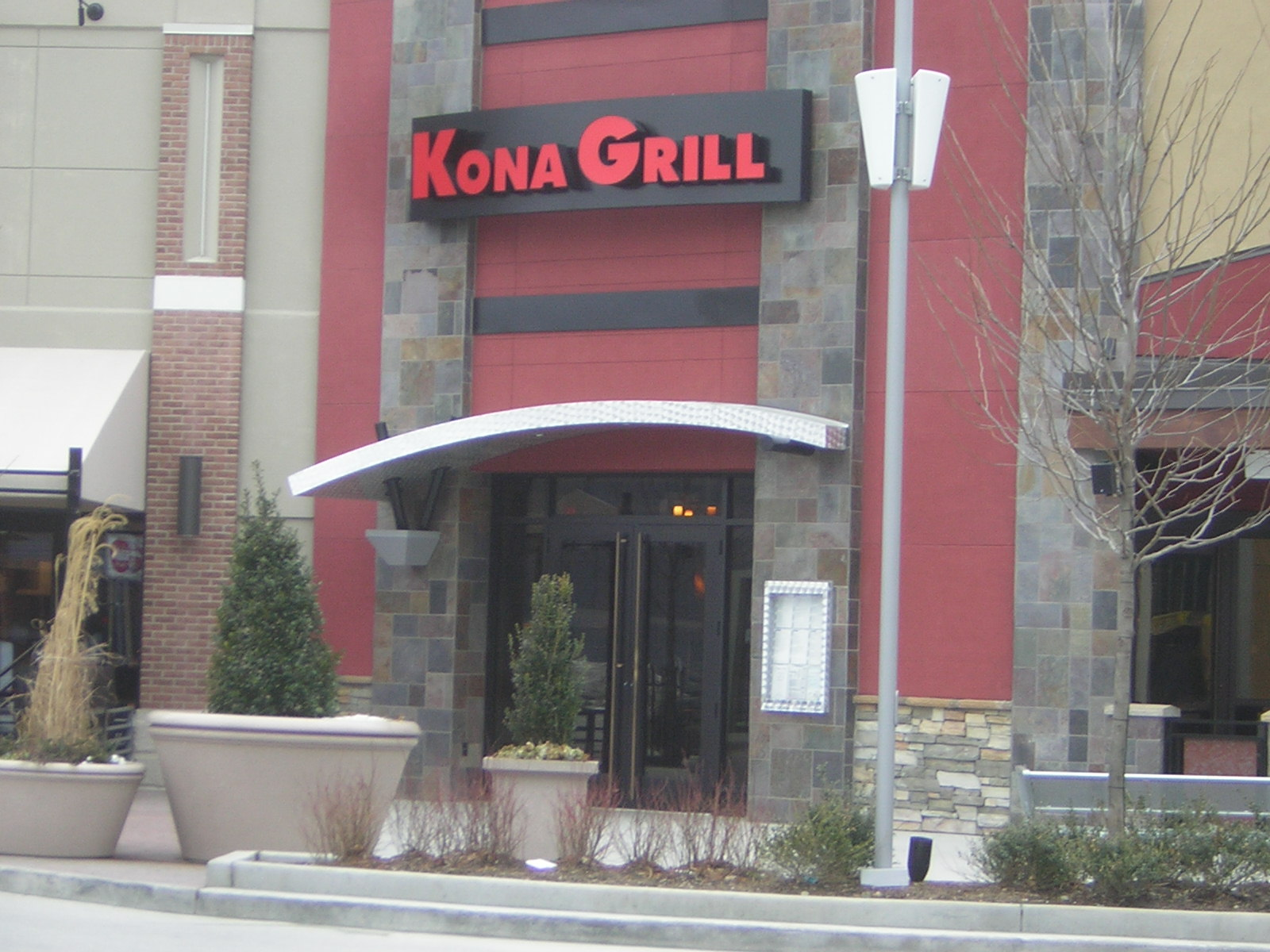
- Kona Grill at Stamford Town Center, now closed
- Company type: Subsidiary
- Founded: 1998; 28 years ago
- Headquarters: Denver, Colorado
- Number of locations: 46 (2017)
- Areas served: United States, Mexico, United Arab Emirates
- Key people: Christi Hing (CEO)
- Revenue: ▼US$ 37.4 million (September 30, 2018)
- Net income: US$-22m (2016)
- Total assets: US$108m (2016)
- Parent: One Group Hospitality Inc.
- Website: konagrill.com

Kona Grill, Inc. is a casual restaurant company based in Denver, Colorado serving American cuisine, sushi, and cocktails. The company owns and operates around 40 restaurants in 23 U.S. states, as well as three international locations operating under franchise agreements. In 2019, STK Parent company, One Hospitality Group purchased Kona Grill for $25 million.

== History ==
Kona Grill first opened its doors on September 18, 1998, at the Scottsdale Fashion Square. The restaurant's predecessor was a sushi concept called Sushi on Shea that opened in Scottsdale in 1994. Restaurant founder, Michael McDermott, decided to create Kona Grill with more American-themed menu items. The new restaurant was made to have a modern ambiance. McDermott sold Sushi on Shea in 2002 to focus on expanding Kona Grill.

Kona Grill went public on August 16, 2005, with an initial public offering of $11 per share on the NASDAQ. The company raised $28.8 million and grew its restaurant base to 9 locations by December 31, 2005.

By 2014, Kona Grill had grown to 26 restaurants in 17 states. In 2014, it saw same-store sales growth in 14 out of its past 15 quarters with an increase of 6.2%, ranking the concept in the top quartile of the casual dining segment and marking it as one of the fastest growing restaurants that year.

In August 2017, Kona opened its first international franchise location at Fashion Drive in Monterrey, Mexico. It opened a location at Al Seef in Dubai, UAE that November, and a location in Vaughan, Canada in December 2017.

On March 4, 2019, Kona Grill hired Piper Jaffray to seek a merger or the sale of Kona Grill

On April 30, 2019, Kona Grill filed for Chapter 11 bankruptcy protection. Locations across the country including in Arizona, Texas, Hawaii, Puerto Rico and Virginia closed the spring of 2019.

== Corporate ==
On March 21, 2019, Shawn Hassel took a seat on the Board of Directors as Chair of the company's Strategic Alternatives Committee. On March 27, 2019, Kona Grill's Executive Chairman Berke Bakay resigned. A federal bankruptcy court has approved the sale of 24 Kona Grill polished-causal restaurants for $20.3 million to Williston Holding, reported by Restaurant Business on July 26, 2019.
