= Leslie's =

U.S. retail company, based in Arizona

Leslie's, Inc.
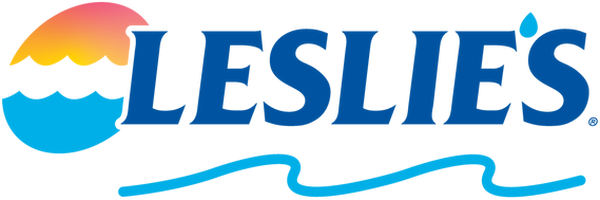
- Trade name: Leslie's Swimming Pool Supplies
- Type: Public
- Traded as: Nasdaq: LESL; S&P 600 component
- Industry: Retail
- Founded: 1963; 63 years ago
- Founder: Phil Leslie
- Headquarters: Phoenix, Arizona, U.S.
- Number of locations: 930 (2020)
- Products: Pool and spa supplies
- Revenue: ▼US$1.24 billion (2025)
- Net income: ▼ −US$237 million (2025)
- Owner: Publicly traded
- Website: lesliespool.com

Leslie's, Inc., operating as Leslie's Swimming Pool Supplies, is the largest retailer of swimming pool supplies and related products. The company is headquartered in Phoenix, Arizona, and has a particularly strong retail presence in Arizona, California, Florida, Georgia and Texas.

== Stores ==
Leslie's operates over 975 stores in 37 states throughout the United States. According to a company representative, it employs 3,500 people year-round and adds hundreds of seasonal employees, bringing its workforce to above 5,000 during its peak summer season.

The firm stocks essential pool maintenance and cleaning supplies, in addition to pool accessories and pool toys, and has more than 30,000 items available through the company's other distribution channels, such as its website and special order processes.

Leslie's also sells its own brand of pool supplies, which accounted for a large portion of the company's total sales in 2009.

== Products ==
Leslie's sells a full range of supplies for pool maintenance, including chemicals, cleaning devices, equipment and parts, as well as recreational and safety products for swimming pools. Leslie's also sells supplies for hot tub/spa maintenance as well as, patio and backyard furniture and accessories.

== History ==
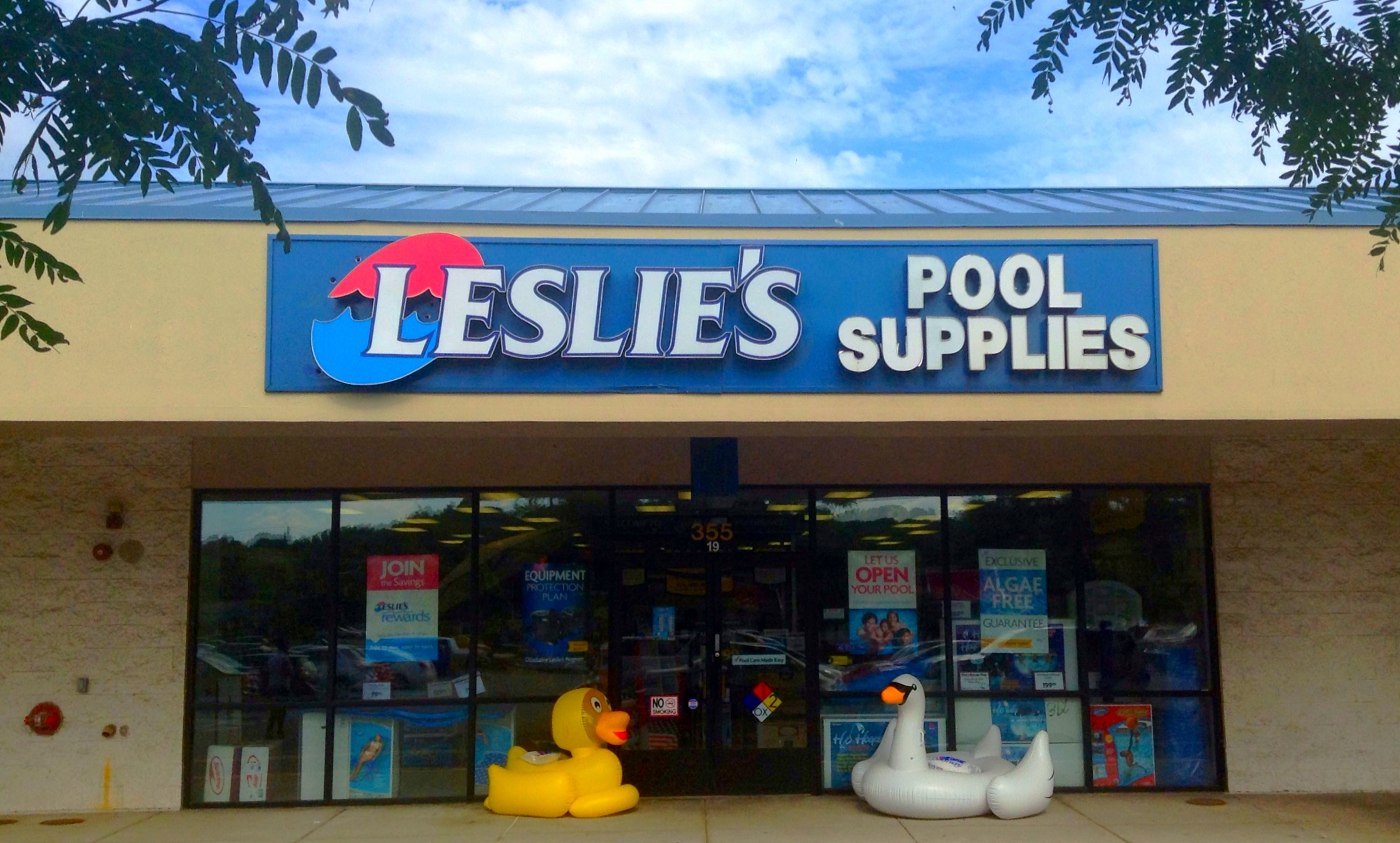
A Leslie's store in North Haven, Connecticut

Leslie's was founded in 1963 by Phil Leslie, Jr. (son of Hollywood comedy writer Phil Leslie, Sr.) in a single location in North Hollywood, Los Angeles. Leslie, together with partner Raymond Cesmat, began the company by opening a chain of swimming pool supply stores in the Greater Los Angeles area.

The two founding partners, Leslie and Cesmat, began fighting over the future of the company in the late 1980s, and Cesmat determined he wanted to sell his stake. In 1987, Leslie offered to buy Cesmat's stock at a prior agreed-upon price, but Cesmat would not accept. Cesmat filed to have the corporation dissolved, and in 1988, a California superior court judge ordered the company be sold. The company was acquired, in a hostile take-over, for $23 million by private equity firm Hancock Park Associates. Leslie received $10 million from the sale of the company but was vocal that the company had been taken from him, as the sale was highly leveraged and court-ordered. Following the sale of the company, managers at most Leslie's stores refused to open their stores in an expression of loyalty to Mr. Leslie. Ultimately, the new ownership and management were able to replace managers of stores that refused to open.

By the early 1990s, the company was again generating profits, and the company listed its stock on NASDAQ. A 1991 initial public offering raised $28 million for the sale of 47% of the company, using the cash to repay debt and fund an expansion of the business. From the beginning of 1989 through the end of 1996, Leslie's grew from 66 to 259 company-owned and operated stores, including 23 stores added in September 1992 through the acquisition of Sandy's Pool Supply, Inc., which Mr. Leslie half-owned and had expanded from just two stores.

In 1997, the company was taken private for $140 million by Hancock, assisted by private equity firm Leonard Green & Partners. In 2010, Leonard Green explored a sale of the company targeting in excess of $1 billion for the company. In lieu of a sale, Leonard Green ultimately sold a substantial stake in the company to CVC Capital Partners and GSO Capital Partners.

In 2014, Leslie's comprised over 750 stores, expanding to 910 by 2015. In 2017 Leslie's Poolmart was acquired by L Catterton, which claims to be the largest consumer-focused private equity firm in the world. In February 2020, Michael Egeck assumed the role of chief executive officer. In October 2020, the company filed IPO again. On November 2, 2020, the company announced the closing of their initial public offering of 46,000,000 shares of common stock. September 9, 2024, Leslies, Inc. announced resignation of Michael Egeck and appointment of Jason McDonell as its new Chief Executive Officer and newest Board member.

On September 25, 2026, Nasdaq notified Leslie’s that its common stock was subject to delisting after the shares traded below the $1 minimum bid requirement for 30 consecutive business days. The company was ineligible for Nasdaq’s normal compliance period because it had completed a reverse stock split within the previous year. Nasdaq is scheduled to suspend trading in Leslie’s shares on October 6, 2026; the company said it does not intend to appeal the decision.

On September 30, 2026, Leslie's filed for Chapter 11 bankruptcy protection with plans to cut its debt by 90% and sell itself to creditors. The move came amid pressures from weather-related disruptions, higher input costs and weak consumer spending in the pool industry, with the company planning to exit bankruptcy in early 2027. As part of the bankruptcy, the company permanently closed 76 underperforming stores immediately, with additional closures potentially occurring in an effort to "better align its footprint with the long-term needs of the business."
