= OnTrac =

US regional last-mile delivery company

LaserShip, Inc.
- Trade name: OnTrac Final Mile
- Type: Private
- Industry: Transport
- Founded: 1986; 40 years ago
- Headquarters: Vienna, Virginia, U.S.
- Number of locations: Over 102 facilities (2026); 18 sortation centers (2026)
- Area served: Continental United States
- Key people: Mike Brown, CEO; Akash Chauhan, COO; Arjun Sainath, CTO
- Website: ontrac.com

LaserShip, Inc., which brands itself OnTrac Final Mile, is a last-mile transportation company that services the continental United States. Founded in 1986 as Laser Courier, the company is based in Vienna, Virginia, and has sorting centers in 31 states.

In 2021, LaserShip acquired west coast delivery service OnTrac Logistics, Inc. for $1.3 billion. The two entities merged their delivery networks to form a transcontinental delivery network and rebranded their combined services to OnTrac Final Mile.

== History ==
LaserShip began as a document delivery service in 1986. In the 1990s, LaserShip landed in the small parcel business during the dot-com boom. In 1999, the company partnered with Barnes & Noble to provide same-day shipping services in New York City.

In March 2014, LaserShip added four states to its service area: New Hampshire, Rhode Island, West Virginia and Delaware. This expanded the LaserShip footprint by 44 percent, reaching an additional 8.5 million consumers. Also in March 2014, LaserShip acquired Cleveland-based last-mile delivery company Prestige Delivery Systems, further expanding services to Ohio, Kentucky, Michigan and Indiana.

As of 2016, LaserShip had 63 distribution centers and four sorting centers servicing 22 states and Washington, D.C., and handled deliveries for Amazon's Same Day Service.

In early 2018, the company was purchased by private equity firm Greenbriar Equity Group.

In April 2019, LaserShip was awarded the International Supply Chain Protection Organization (ISCPO) Carrier Certification; the company has also achieved compliance with ISCPO Carrier Security Requirements.

In May 2021, LaserShip expanded into Tennessee, opening three new branches in Memphis, Knoxville, and Nashville. This expansion added 979 new zip codes, an 18 percent increase in their delivery coverage.

In October 2021 LaserShip acquired west coast delivery service OnTrac Logistics, Inc. for $1.3 billion, equivalent to $1.54 billion in 2025.

In early 2023 LaserShip and OnTrac expanded to Texas, growing the combined LaserShip and OnTrac delivery network to cover 68% of the U.S. population.

In April 2023, the company announced plans to change its name to OnTrac.

== Disputes and settlements ==
OnTrac has been criticized for drivers roughly handling goods, including throwing and driving over packages. LaserShip drivers have also been reported for damaging and stealing the personal property of recipients. The company has been penalized by multiple governments for misclassifying drivers as independent contractors.

=== Package tossing, property damage, and theft ===
In 2017, numerous news reports backed up by surveillance camera footage depict LaserShip delivery drivers recklessly tossing packages onto customers' property. A New York magazine article entitled "LaserShip, Amazon's New Shipping Partner, Might Be the Most Hated Company on the Internet" features a compilation video showing numerous such incidents at over a dozen different households, with packages ending up on porches, in front lawns, and on driveways.

=== Misclassification and non-payment of drivers ===
In April 2014, the company reached a class-action settlement of $800,000 (equivalent to $1.09 million in 2025) with drivers in Massachusetts who accused the company of misclassifying them as independent contractors. In November 2015, a class action lawsuit was filed in the United States District Court for the Southern District of New York alleging that workers were denied overtime payments, were unlawfully denied earned compensation, and for other violations of the Fair Labor Standards Act. The results of this litigation are pending.

In June 2019, LaserShip was ordered to pay $597,000 (equivalent to $751,786 in 2025) to drivers in New Jersey who had been classified as independent contractors after an investigation by the US Department of Labor.

=== Cigarette settlement ===
In September 2014, LaserShip reached a $5 million (equivalent to $6.8 million in 2025) settlement with the city of New York over deliveries of untaxed cigarettes originating from Indian reservations. The original suit alleged that LaserShip had delivered more than 120,000 cartons between 2011 and 2013 violating federal and state laws and resulting in tax losses of $1.9 million, equivalent to $2.63 million in 2025. The case was prosecuted under the Prevent All Cigarette Trafficking (PACT) Act, the Contraband Cigarette Trafficking Act, the Racketeer Influenced and Corrupt Organizations (RICO) Act, and New York Public Health Law 1399-ll. Under the settlement agreement, LaserShip ended all cigarette shipments.
