= Small business software =

Small business software refers to software specifically designed to help small business owners run their operations better, cut costs, and replace paper processes.

The small business software industry covers a wide variety of tools and packages, ranging from small business CRM software and Human Resource Management Systems (HRMS), to accounting, office productivity, and communications software. Companies like Salesforce and Zoho Corporation provide cloud-based software platforms, typically available as subscriptions, to provide management, analytical, and marketing software.

The most pressing issue for small businesses has been to organize their financial records, mostly due to government requirements in tax reporting. This perhaps explains why accounting software for small business seems to be a growing market.

== See also ==
- Accounting software
