= Massage Envy =

American massage and skin care franchisor

- The company's logo
- Founded: 2002; 24 years ago
- Headquarters: Scottsdale, Arizona, U.S.
- Number of locations: ~1,000 (2022)
- Area served: United States
- Key people: Todd Schrader (CEO)
- Website: massageenvy.com

Massage Envy Franchising LLC is an American massage, body care, facial and skin care national franchisor, based in Scottsdale, Arizona. The Massage Envy franchise network is the largest provider of results-driven massages and skin care in the United States, and has nearly 1,000 independently owned and operated franchise locations. Massage Envy was established in 2002 and began franchising in 2003.

== Corporate overview ==
Massage Envy is based in Scottsdale, Arizona. Its network of franchised locations is the largest provider of therapeutic massages and skin care in the United States. The Massage Envy franchise network uses a membership-based business model, Massage Envy franchised locations are collectively the largest American employer of massage therapists and estheticians. In addition to massage therapy, facials, skin peels, and microderm infusion, Massage Envy franchises offer stretch therapy and skin care products.

Todd Schrader is the chief executive officer (CEO), and succeeded Beth Stiller who was CEO from late 2019 to early 2024.

== History ==
Massage Envy was founded in 2002 and started franchising in 2003. By late 2008, Massage Envy franchisees collectively employed more than 8,000 professionals at 420 independently owned and operated locations in 36 U.S. states. The Massage Envy franchise network expanded its membership-based business model in 2009 by adding facials and other spa services. There were approximately 650 franchised locations by late 2010. Forbes ranked Massage Envy number 20 on their 2012 list of "Top 20 Franchises for the Buck". According to the magazine, franchises required an initial investment averaging $455,505 and made over $1 million in annual sales in 2010. Massage Envy partnered with Susan G. Komen for the Cure for a campaign called "Massage for the Cure", which raised over $1.4 million by August 2010.

There were more than 1,100 locations in 49 U.S. states, as of March 2022. The Massage Envy franchise network expanded its skin care products and service offerings in 2017 to include Image Skincare and PCA Skin as well as non-surgical procedures such as chemical peels and microderm abrasion. The company also announced plans for its franchisees to remodel more than 700 locations, and to launch new body stretch, facial, and massage services over the next few years. In late 2017, Entrepreneur reported there were 1,189 franchises, with startup costs ranging from $434,800 to approximately $1 million.

In November 2017, BuzzFeed reported that over 180 women had "filed sexual assault lawsuits, police reports, and state board complaints against Massage Envy spas, their employees, and the national company" over allegations of sexual misconduct. The women also accused Massage Envy of ignoring or mishandling most of the cases they reported to the company. According to BuzzFeed's article, Massage Envy requires internal investigations of reported abuse, but does not provide significant instruction on how they should be conducted, and it does not require that law enforcement be notified except in states with laws requiring such notification. The article also stated that employees of Massage Envy franchises were not equipped to conduct internal investigations into abuse allegations. In response, the company issued a statement describing the incidents as "heartbreaking". The company's statement also noted that the Massage Envy franchise network had performed over 125 million massages during their more than 15 years of operation, but added that "even one incident is too many". The company founded a safety advisory council with industry executives and a representative from the anti-sexual assault advocacy organization Rape, Abuse & Incest National Network (RAINN). Massage Envy also added a "Commitment to Safety" to their website to make clients aware of implemented changes.

The company announced a private label skin care brand CyMe (pronounced "see me") in 2018. According to Women's Wear Daily, skin care accounted for approximately seven percent of the company's business, as of April 2018. The Massage Envy franchise network also launched assisted stretch services in 2018, featuring proprietary methods administered by a massage therapist. Entrepreneur ranked Massage Envy number 358 on its 2019 "Franchise 500" list.

The Massage Envy network has funded massage therapy research conducted by the Massage Therapy Foundation, as well as the Touch Research Institute, part of the University of Miami's Miller School of Medicine. In December 2018, Massage Envy announced a partnership with the Cortiva Institute, the largest group of massage therapy and skincare schools in the U.S., to provide development and employment opportunities through Massage Envy franchise locations for Cortiva graduates at Massage Envy clinics.

In 2015, Adweek reported that the company hired a new lead agency and spent approximately $15 million annually on advertising and marketing, with franchisees spending an additional $40 million annually in local markets. The company rebranded in 2016, targeting baby boomers and millennials; the "Because Everything" campaign promoted massage as holism rather than a luxury, and featured men, who made up 25 percent of Massage Envy's clientele.

The Massage Envy network spent $17.9 million on measured media in the U.S. in 2017. Fallon Worldwide became the company's Agency of record in 2018. Massage Envy launched a brand awareness campaign "Keep your body working" in early 2019. The campaign, expected to cost $20–25 million, includes radio and television ads, as well as digital video and social media placements. It continues to focus on holism and replaces the previous tagline, "Making the most of every body".

=== Sponsorships ===
In 2017 and 2018, Massage Envy sponsored the PGA Tour and was the "official total body care sponsor" of Player Performance Centers, mobile trailers staffed with chiropractors, personal trainers, and physical therapy professionals to administer massage and stretch therapy to players. As part of the sponsorship, Massage Envy partnered with ten professional golfers as spokespeople for "The Streto Method", a proprietary method created by experts in chiropractic treatments, ergonomics, and massage therapy to deliver the company's "Total Body Stretch" service offering. Spokespeople who appeared in television advertisements, wore branded clothing, or used logo-emblazoned equipment included Jamie Lovemark, Patrick Rodgers, and Justin Thomas. The method started being offered at franchised locations in mid 2017. In 2018, the sponsorship expanded to include the PGA Tour Champions and The Players Championship, and Hailey Ostrom was a spokesperson.
