= Rural Metro =

American private fire department company

Rural/Metro Fire Dept., Inc
- Trade name: Rural Metro Fire Department
- Type: Private
- Industry: Firefighting, emergency service
- Founded: 1948
- Founder: Lou Witzeman
- Headquarters: Union Grove, Alabama, United States
- Revenue: $140 million
- Parent: Solomon Safety Group (formerly Brindlee Fire Services)
- Website: www.ruralmetrofire.com

Rural/Metro Fire Dept., Inc is an American private fire department that provides fire protection and emergency medical services to homes and businesses in unincorporated locations throughout the United States, primarily under a subscription-based model. Municipalities, fire districts, airports, and industrial customers also contract with Rural Metro Fire to provide fire protection, prevention, and emergency medical services.

Rural Metro Corporation, is a private ambulance company owned and operated by American Medical Response, and is no longer associated with Rural Metro Fire Department.

Rural/Metro Fire Dept., Inc. is the full legal name; however, the department typically operates as Rural Metro Fire or Rural Metro Fire Department for ease and consistency within the fire service industry.

== History ==
The company was founded by Lou Witzeman, a newspaper reporter, after he witnessed a house fire near his home just outside the city limits of Phoenix, Arizona in 1948. There was no fire department established for the area; so Witzeman, feeling something had to be done, purchased a fire engine and proceeded to go door to door asking residents to subscribe to the new fire service by paying an annual membership fee (in lieu of taxes). This was the origin of the Rural Fire Department, later named Rural Metro Fire Department. In the 1980s, the company expanded into ambulance service. Rural Metro Corporation began listing shares in 1993 on the NASDAQ exchange under the stock symbol RURL.

In 2011 investment fund Warburg Pincus purchased Rural Metro Corporation in a $438 million cash deal. By early 2013 Rural Metro Corporation filed for Chapter 11 restructuring in Federal Court in Delaware after missing an interest payment on its debt. The reorganization would see bondholders infuse $135 million in new capital. Some contracts were renegotiated but no services were affected.

In 2015, Rural Metro Corporation merged with American Medical Response and senior management was released or merged into the parent corporation. In 2018, both American Medical Response and Rural Metro Corporation became part of Global Medical Response.

In 2024, Solomon Safety Group (formerly Brindlee Fire Services) purchased Rural Metro Fire Department from Global Medical Response. Rural Metro Corporation (Rural Metro Ambulance), which is a separate legal entity, was not a part of the sale and remains a private ambulance company owned and operated by American Medical Response.

== Community Fire Protection Services ==
Rural Metro Fire provides fire protection services primarily under a subscription-based model to individual homeowners and commercial property owners in unincorporated areas that do not offer municipal fire protection services in various areas of the United States. These areas are not included within municipal fire department boundaries or paid for by property taxes. It is the business model that Rural Metro Fire was founded upon. In other areas, municipalities contract with Rural Metro Fire partners to provide fire protection, prevention and emergency medical services. In the event that Rural Metro Fire Department provides services to non-subscribers either in or around the communities they serve, the property owner is billed after the incident to recoup costs associated with the emergency.

== Specialty Fire Protection Services ==
Rural Metro Fire also provides fire protection, safety, and rescue services for airports, industrial facilities, and wildland fire prevention and protection, operating under Rural Metro Fire Department and Capstone Fire and Safety Management. The specialty services maintain membership in the following organizations: National Fire Protection Association (NFPA), International Association of Fire Chiefs (IAFC); Aircraft Rescue and Fire Fighting Working Group (ARFF WG); American Association of Airport Executives (AAAE); AAAE-Great Lakes Chapter; Louisiana Airport Managers and Associates (LAMA), and ISNetworld.

== See also ==
- Fire Department
- Emergency medical services
- Rescue
