= Keap =

E-mail marketing and sales platform company

- Type: Private
- Industry: Small business customer relationship management, Email marketing, E-commerce
- Founded: 2001
- Headquarters: Chandler, Arizona
- Key people: Clate Mask, CEO and Co-founder; Scott Martineau, Senior Vice President of Product Strategy
- Services: Saas, Marketing and sales automation software, CRM software
- Revenue: $100 million (2017)
- Number of employees: 650+
- Website: keap.com

Keap (formerly Infusionsoft) is a private company that offers an e-mail marketing and sales platform for small businesses, including products to manage customers, customer relationship management, marketing, and e-commerce. It is based in Chandler, Arizona.

The company received $54 million in venture capital from Goldman Sachs in early 2013. In total, the company has generated over $125 million in funding.

== History ==
Infusionsoft was founded in 2001 by brothers Scott and Eric Martineau in Mesa, Arizona with now CEO Clate Mask.

As of January 2019, the company was known as Keap.

In February 2020, The improvements have emerged after the small business selling and marketing software company modified its name in January 2019 after 18 years of operation as Infusionsoft to Keap and started providing non-tech experienced businesses with a smaller, simplified variant of their apps.

On October 29, 2024,Thryv Holdings announced a strategic acquisition of Keap, .

== Company overview ==
Keap offers an integrated email marketing platform for small business users.

The Keap platform can create and host Web forms and links, execute automated campaigns, track ROI, provide customer sales updates, database management and e-commerce functionality.
