= Meritage Homes Corporation =

U.S. homebuilding company

Meritage Homes
- Type: Public
- Traded as: NYSE: MTH; S&P 600 component
- Industry: Home construction
- Founded: 1985
- Founders: Steve Hilton, William "Bill" Cleverly
- Headquarters: Scottsdale, Arizona, U.S.
- Key people: Steven J. Hilton (Founder, Executive Chairman of the Board, Emeritus CEO); Phillippe Lord (CEO); Larry W. Seay (Former CFO and Executive VP)
- Net income: US$423 million (2020)
- Number of employees: 1,570 (2020)
- Subsidiaries: Monterey Homes; Meritage Active Adult
- Website: www.meritagehomes.com

Meritage Homes Corporation is a publicly traded American real estate development company that constructs a variety of single-family detached homes across the United States. It is the fifth largest home builder in the United States, based on 2023 home sales. The company also develops active adult communities and luxury real estate in Arizona.

The company is headquartered in Scottsdale, Arizona.

== History ==
Meritage Homes was founded in 1985 as Monterey Homes in Scottsdale, Arizona, by Steve Hilton and William "Bill" Cleverly.

In 1997, the company changed its name to Meritage Homes Corp, and began trading on the New York Stock Exchange under the symbol MTH.

In 2011, the company unveiled its first net-zero energy homes, in Buckeye, Arizona.

In July 2014, the company acquired Douglasville, Georgia-based Legendary Communities, the owner operator of almost 4,000 home sites, for nearly $130 million.

In 2015, the company promoted its Sierra Crest development in Fontana, CA as California's first net-zero energy community.

In April 2019, the company built its first all-electric, zero-net-energy townhome community, in Irvine California. In December, the Wall Street Journal reported how large home builders like Meritage were targeting millennials by producing a larger number of less expensive, entry-level homes.

== Operations ==
Meritage is headquartered in Scottsdale, Arizona, and divides its operations into four regions: West, Central, East and South. It develops homes for entry level and first move-up buyers, including "net zero" energy efficient homes that provide as much power as they consume. The company trades on the NY Stock Exchange under the symbol MTH, and is also listed in the S&P SmallCap 600 Index.

== Awards and recognition ==
In 2021, the company was listed as one of Forbes' best mid-sized companies, ranking #39 on the list.

For several years they have been a Top 10 home builder according to Builder's Top 100 Home Builder rankings. In 2023, they were the 5th largest builder.

== Customer complaints ==
Multiple customers have reported issues with their single family homes. They have described blue tape, cracks, fissures and issues within newly built homes.
