= Benchmark Electronics =

Electronics manufacturer

Benchmark Electronics, Inc.
- Type: Public
- Traded as: NYSE: BHE; S&P 600 component
- Industry: Electronics manufacturing services
- Founded: 1979
- Headquarters: Tempe, Arizona, U.S.
- Key people: David Moezidis, President and Chief Executive Officer
- Revenue: ▼US$2.659 billion (FY 2024)
- Operating income: ▼US$76.049 million (FY 2024)
- Net income: ▼US$24.852 million (FY 2024)
- Total assets: ▼US$2.134 billion (FY 2024)
- Total equity: ▲US$1.105 billion (FY 2024)
- Number of employees: 11,840 (Dec 2025)
- Website: www.bench.com

Benchmark Electronics Inc. is an American engineering and manufacturing company headquartered in Tempe, Arizona. Founded in 1979, the company provides engineering and manufacturing services to original equipment manufacturers in several industries, including aerospace and defense, medical, industrial, advanced computing and communications, and semiconductor capital equipment. The company is publicly traded on the New York Stock Exchange under the ticker symbol BHE.

== History ==
Benchmark Electronics was founded in 1979 as Electronics, Inc. a manufacturing subsidiary of medical device company Intermedics. In 1986, Intermedics sold a majority interest in the company to Electronic Investors Corporation, a group formed by former Intermedics executives. Electronics, Inc. and Electronic Investors Corporation merged in 1988 to form Benchmark Electronics. The company completed an initial public offering in 1990 and transferred its stock listing from the American Stock Exchange to the New York Stock Exchange in 1997.

In 1998, Benchmark acquired Lockheed Martin Commercial Electronics Company in Hudson, New Hampshire. The following year, the company acquired AVEX Electronics, which operated manufacturing facilities in the Americas and Asia, and Stratus Computer Holdings of Dublin, Ireland. In 2000, Benchmark reported annual revenue of more than $1 billion. In 2002, the company opened a manufacturing facility in Suzhou, China, and acquired ACT Manufacturing's operations in Thailand.

Benchmark expanded through a series of acquisitions during the 2000s and 2010s. The company acquired electronics manufacturing and engineering services provider Pemstar in 2007. In 2013, Benchmark acquired Suntron Corporation and the electronics manufacturing services business of CTS Corporation. In 2015, it acquired Secure Technology Company, a provider of engineered electronics and subsystems for industrial, aerospace, and defense applications.

In 2017, Benchmark announced plans to relocate its corporate headquarters from Texas to Arizona. The company opened its global headquarters in Tempe, Arizona, in 2019.

In September 2025, Benchmark appointed David Moezidis as president and announced that he would succeed Jeff Benck as chief executive officer upon Benck's retirement. Moezidis became president and chief executive officer on March 31, 2026.

== Operations ==
Benchmark provides engineering, manufacturing, and supply chain services for original equipment manufacturers. Its capabilities include design engineering, new product introduction, printed circuit board assembly, subsystem and system integration, precision machining, testing, fulfillment, and aftermarket support. The company serves customers in the advanced computing and communications, aerospace and defense, industrial, medical, and semiconductor capital equipment markets.

Benchmark operates engineering, manufacturing, and precision technologies facilities in North America, Europe, and Asia, including locations in the United States, Mexico, the Netherlands, Romania, Thailand, China, Malaysia, and Singapore.
