= Desert Financial Credit Union =

Credit union in Arizona

- Type: Credit union
- Industry: Financial services
- Founded: 1939
- Headquarters: Phoenix, Arizona; United States
- Number of locations: 50+ traditional and in-store branches in central Arizona plus e-Branch online
- Area served: Arizona
- Key people: Jeff Meshey, President & CEO
- Services: Savings; checking; auto loans; mortgage loans; home equity loans; personal loans; mortgages; credit cards; investments; online banking; business loans; wills & trusts; financial planning
- Total assets: $9B USD (September 2025)
- Number of employees: 1,400
- Subsidiaries: Desert Financial Services, LLC Desert Financial Wealth Management SwitchThink Solutions
- Website: www.desertfinancial.com

Desert Financial Credit Union is a credit union based in Phoenix, Arizona, that operates over 50 branches and ATMs throughout Coconino, Gila, Maricopa, Pinal, and Yavapai counties and statewide in Arizona. Desert Financial remains federally insured by the NCUA (National Credit Union Administration) and in addition will be regulated by the Arizona Department of Financial Institutions, which regulates state-chartered credit unions in Arizona. Desert Financial is the largest local credit union in Arizona, managing over $9 billion in assets as of 2026, with over 500,000 members.

== History ==
Desert Financial was originally named Arizona Educational Association (A.E.A.) #1 Federal Credit Union and was chartered in 1939 to serve the financial needs of area teachers. In 1972, the credit union rebranded to Desert Schools Federal Credit Union (following a brief existence as Desert School Employees Federal Credit Union) to better define its niche market. In 1996, they expanded their charter to serve three counties in Arizona and disregarded vocation as a membership qualifier. In 2020, Desert Financial became a statewide charter.

In 2018, the Desert Schools Federal Credit Union was renamed Desert Financial Credit Union, in order to address misconceptions that it still only served members of the education community. The rebranding was promoted during a commercial aired locally during Super Bowl LII, featuring Phoenix native Alice Cooper and playing upon his band's 1972 song "School's Out".

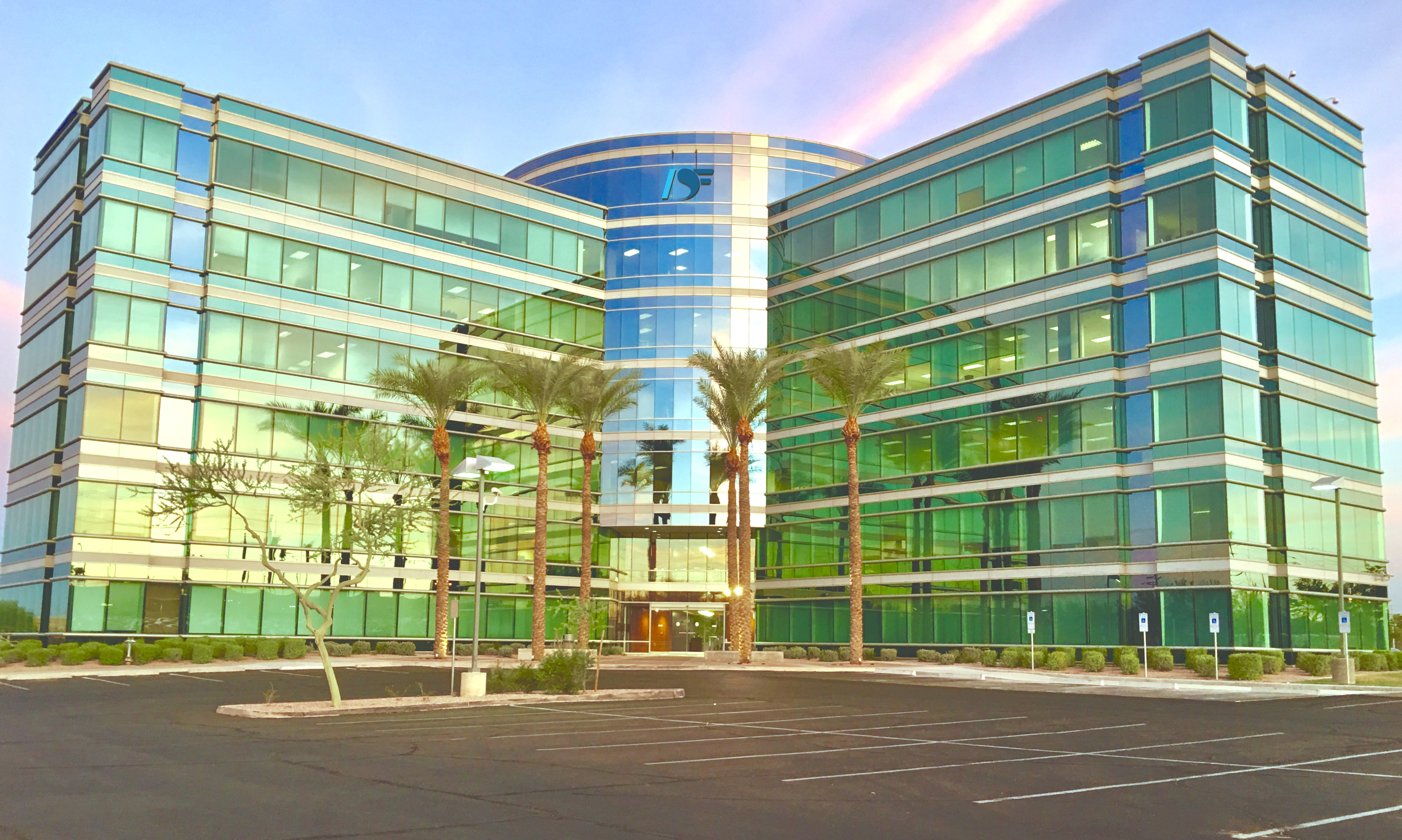
The Desert Financial Headquarters in Phoenix.

== Membership ==
Desert Financial serves approximately 500,000 members. Individuals that live, work, worship, or attend school in the following Arizona counties may join Desert Financial Credit Union:

- Apache (online banking only)
- Cochise (online banking only)
- Coconino
- Gila
- Graham (online banking only)
- Greenlee (online banking only)
- La Paz (online banking only)
- Maricopa
- Mohave (online banking only)
- Navajo (online banking only)
- Pima (online banking only)
- Pinal
- Santa Cruz (online banking only)
- Yavapai
- Yuma (online banking only)

Additionally, family members of active or eligible members may also join.

== Services ==
Desert Financial Credit Union offers a variety of financial products, including:

- Savings and checking accounts
- Savings certificates
- IRAs
- Home equity loans
- Mortgage loans
- Business loans
- Consumer and business platinum, bonus, and bonus rewards plus Visa credit cards
- Vehicle and watercraft loans
- Direct deposit
- Money market
- Internet and mobile banking
- Wills and trusts

== Community Involvement and Partnerships ==
Desert Financial donates an average of $5 million annually to local charities and causes, and their employees also donate and volunteer in the community on a regular basis. In 2018, the credit union established the Desert Financial Foundation as their first nonprofit entity.

In 2019, Desert Financial bought the naming rights to the Arizona State University arena and renamed it to Desert Financial Arena. Five years later, the credit union became the official retail banking partner of Arizona State University, strengthening the partnership with the university.

In 2024, Desert Financial became the official banking partner of NAU Athletics and NAU Alumni. In 2025, the credit union opened a branch in the NAU University Union to better serve students in Northern Arizona.

Desert Financial and the Arizona Cardinals announced a multi-year partnership that makes Desert Financial the "Official Banking Partner of the Arizona Cardinals" in 2024. The credit union is also the presenting partner of the Arizona Cardinals training camp. This partnership expands on a 20-year relationship between the organizations and features exclusive Cardinals debit card designs and benefits.
