= Mobile Mini =

American industrial company

WillScot Holdings Corp.
- Formerly: Mobile Mini Storage Solutions
- Type: Subsidiary
- Traded as: Nasdaq: WSC
- Industry: Portable storage
- Founded: June 1983; 43 years ago
- Founder: Richard Bunger
- Headquarters: Phoenix, Arizona, U.S.
- Number of locations: 177
- Area served: U.S., Canada, and U.K.
- Key people: Timothy D. Boswell (President & CEO)
- Products: Portable storage Ground-level office Tanks; Pumps; Roll-off boxes Filtration
- Revenue: US$593 million
- Total assets: $2B
- Number of employees: 2,000+
- Parent: WillScot Mobile Mini Holdings Corp.
- Divisions: Storage Solutions; Tank + Pump Solutions
- Website: www.mobilemini.com https://www.mobilemini.co.uk

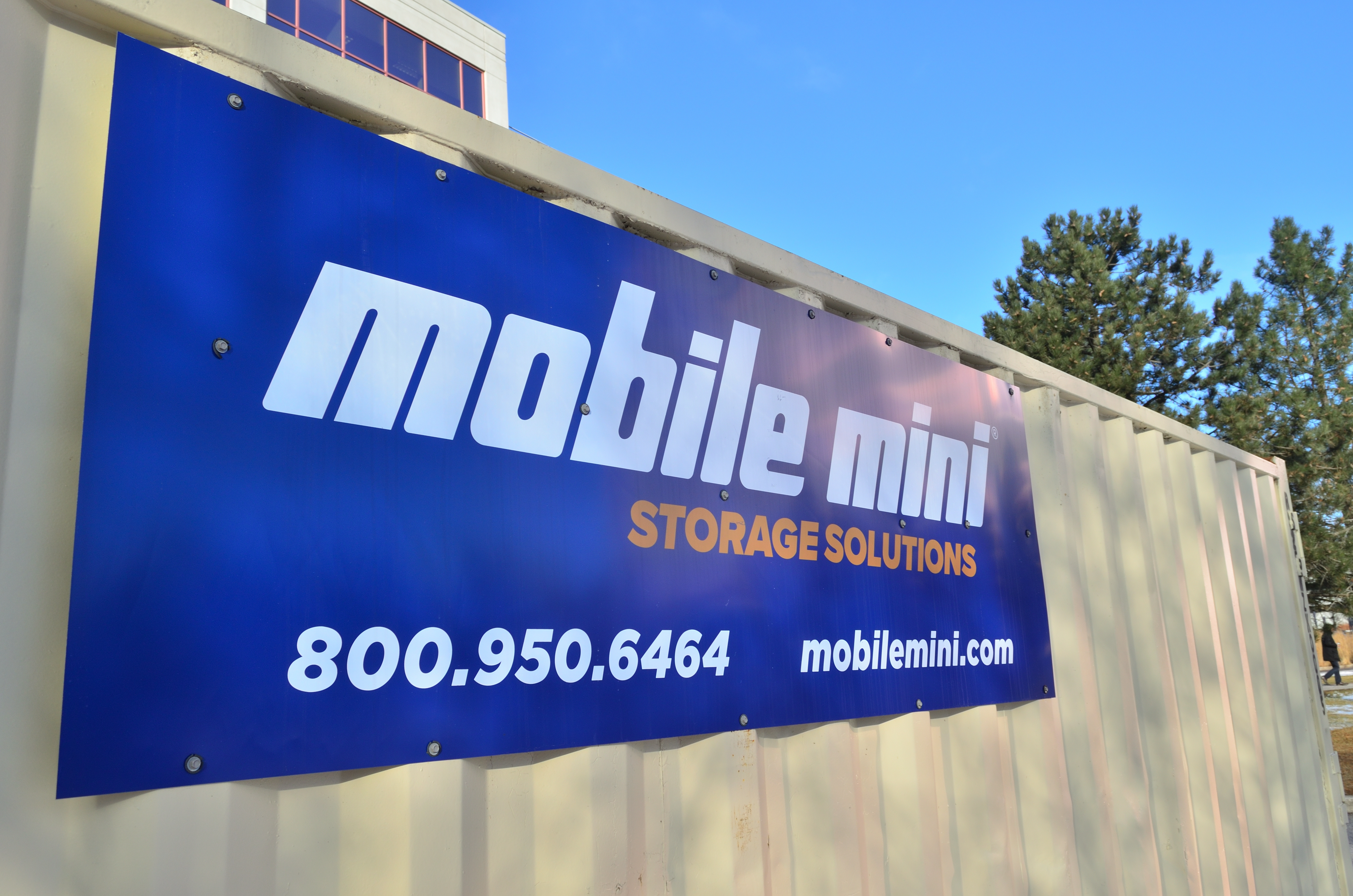
Mobile Mini container

Mobile Mini, Inc. (known as WillScot Holdings Corp as of 2024) is an American portable storage company founded in 1983 and based in Phoenix, Arizona.

The company manufactures, leases, sells, and transports welded steel mobile storage containers, converted into storage units, guard shacks, and offices. The lengths of the units are 5 to 45 feet long and can be customized with up to 100 different configuration options. Mobile Mini's lease fleet totals approximately 235,000 portable storage and office units.

The company has 177 locations throughout the United States of America, Canada, and the United Kingdom. The company had a market capitalization of about US$1.363 billion as of July 2019, with revenues of about $593 million in 2018.

In 2020, the company merged with WillScot. In 2024, the company rebranded as WillScot Holdings Corp.

== History ==
Mobile Mini (originally Mobile Mini Storage Systems) was founded in 1983 by Richard Bunger and was started by selling storage containers to construction companies and manufacturers.

By 1986, the company expanded into markets outside Phoenix, Arizona but in the Southwest region. Due to a shortage of cargo storage containers available, Mobile Mini started manufacturing containers in Phoenix. The early 1990s also saw the development of Mobile Mini's patented "bi-cam locking system." As manufacturing facilities grew to accommodate new product lines and innovations, larger facilities were created, and Mobile Mini started building modular classrooms for the Arizona and New Mexico markets. In addition to these innovations and changes, Mobile Mini experienced huge growth in Texas, including Dallas, Houston, and San Antonio, and completed acquisitions in 1998 in Las Vegas, Nevada and Oklahoma City, Oklahoma.

During the early 2000s, Mobile Mini "consistently met or exceeded earnings expectations". Mobile Mini also patented their "Tri-Cam Locking System". International expansion occurred in 2004 with the acquisition of Royal Wolf in the UK and the subsequent launch of the Mobile Mini UK website. In 2008, the company merged with The Mobile Storage Group, giving Mobile Mini a combined portable storage and office rental fleet of more than 274,000 units.

In 2013, Mobile Mini appointed Erik Olsson as CEO.

In November 2014, Mobile Mini expanded its product line by purchasing Evergreen Tank Solutions for $405 million in cash. ETS was a leader in liquid and specialty containment solutions. With a fleet of tanks, trucks, pumps, and filters, Evergreen was a solid acquisition with a similar business model.

In Spring 2015, Mobile Mini announced the decision to divest 9,400 wood mobile offices in a sale to Acton Mobile. The divestiture allowed Mobile Mini to focus on core storage and containment products.

In February 2017, Mobile Mini announced uniting all divisions under the Mobile Mini brand. The storage and ground-level office piece was re-branded Mobile Mini Storage Solutions. In contrast, the specialty containment pieces of Evergreen Tank and Water Movers are called Mobile Mini Tank + Pump Solutions. The overarching brand became Mobile Mini Solutions.

Also, in 2017 came Mobile Mini Connect, an on-demand customer service portal. The service offers customers real-time account information and the ability to manage invoices, forms, and rentals, in addition to requesting unit pickups.

In March 2020, Mobile Mini entered into a merger agreement with Baltimore-based modular space rental company WillScot Corporation. The estimated value of the combined company is approximately $6.6 billion.

In 2024, the company rebranded as WillScot Holdings Corp.
