= Arizona Financial Credit Union =

Credit union in Arizona, United States

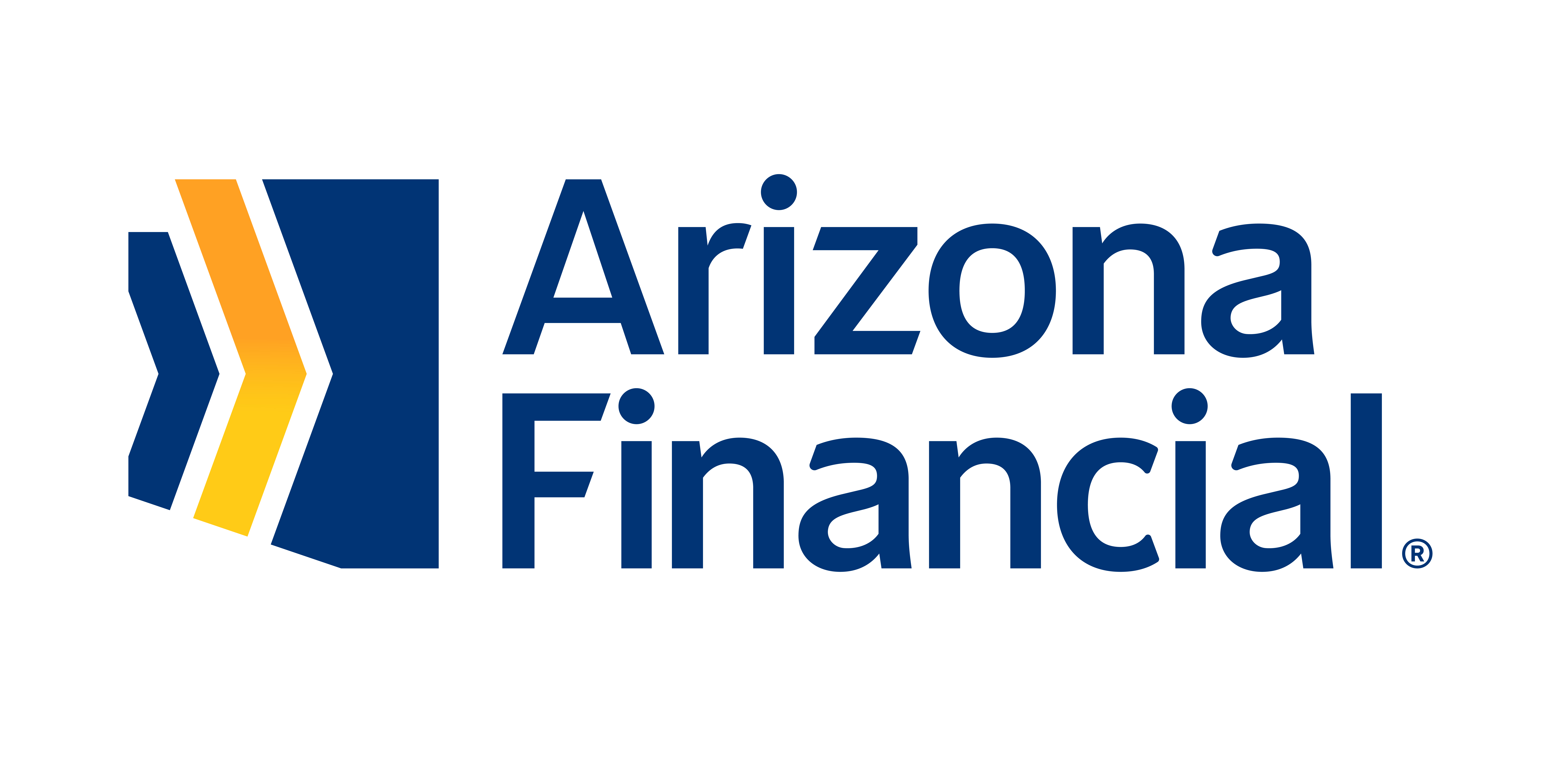
- Company type: Credit union
- Industry: Financial services
- Founded: 1936
- Headquarters: Phoenix, Arizona; United States
- Area served: 10 Arizona counties (Coconino, Gila, La Paz, Maricopa, Mohave, Navajo, Pima, Pinal, Yavapai, Yuma)
- Key people: David Albertson, Board of Directors Chair; Amy L. Hysell, President/CEO
- Products: Savings; Checking; Consumer loans; Mortgages; Credit cards; Investments
- Total assets: $3.4B USD
- Website: www.arizonafinancial.org

Arizona Financial Credit Union (or Arizona Financial) is a federally insured credit union headquartered in Phoenix, Arizona, United States. It has $3.4 billion in assets and is the second-largest credit union in the state. As of June 2025, there were 20 branch locations across Arizona.

It was founded in 1936 and traces its roots to multiple credit unions created to serve municipal employees in various Valley cities. It was known as Arizona Federal Credit Union from 1981 to 2022, when it converted from a federal to a state charter.

== History ==
Arizona Financial was established in 1936 as the Phoenix City Employees Federal Credit Union. This union merged with similar credit unions for city employees of Mesa (and Chandler), Scottsdale, and Tempe in 1981 to form Arizona Federal Credit Union, with 28,000 members and $48 million in assets. Arizona Federal would grow significantly through the years as a result of merging with other credit unions, through a conversion to a community charter, and by benefiting from the boom in population throughout the Phoenix metropolitan area.

In February 2009, Arizona Federal announced a loss of $64 million for the fourth quarter of 2008 and a total loss of over $115 million for 2008, the second-largest annual loss ever for a credit union. In December 2009, Arizona Federal announced plans to close eight branches, its second branch closure wave that year.

In 2012, Arizona Federal reported net income of over $44 million for the year, with a net worth ratio of 9.71%, earning the credit union "well capitalized" status with the National Credit Union Administration.

In June 2017, Arizona Federal Credit Union announced a three-year partnership with Phoenix Rising FC, making it the soccer club's exclusive financial partner.

On December 1, 2019, Arizona Federal Credit Union announced that it had acquired Phoenix-based Pinnacle Bank, valued at $269 million. This was the first acquisition of a bank by a credit union in Arizona. The acquisition was expected to be finalized by the 3rd or 4th quarter of 2020. In 2022, it reached a deal to acquire Horizon Community Bank, which primarily operated in Mohave and La Paz counties; once approved, the combined institution will have $3.4 billion in assets.

Arizona Federal rebranded to Arizona Financial Credit Union effective July 1, 2022, as part of converting from a federally chartered credit union to a state-chartered credit union (as the change required the removal of "Federal" from the name). The change in charter allowed the credit union to expand its field of membership beyond Maricopa and Pinal counties and the city of Tucson to a total of ten Arizona counties.
