= Scottsdale Gun Club =

Indoor shooting range in Arizona, USA

The Scottsdale Gun Club (SGC) is an indoor shooting range located in Scottsdale, Arizona, USA.

The facility is a large public indoor shooting range with 32 total lanes. The building's architect was Arrington Watkins of Phoenix, Arizona and the Club is recognized by the National Association of Shooting Ranges as a 'Five Star Facility'. The 30,000-square-foot (2,800 m^{2}) building includes three eight lane public shooting bays, a tactical bay, and a tactical shoot house.

== History ==
The Scottsdale Gun Club opened for business in May 2004. Conceived by Terry Schmidt, Nadine Little and Mark Hanish, the $8.2 million club was to be a full-service facility for military, law enforcement and private citizens alike.

Some amount of resistance by the community was met when the club was first proposed. As well, banks were reluctant to finance such a project. However, with the support of shooters and firearms enthusiasts, the City of Scottsdale finally approved the club in September 2001.

== Facilities ==
=== Indoor shooting range ===

There are a total of 32 firing lanes, and targets can be set as far as 75 feet (23 m) from the shooter. For safety, each lane is separated from the adjacent lanes by bullet-resistant glass. The range's backstop can handle most calibers of rifle and handgun; anything that produces less than 8100 pound/feet of force. Each lane has an advanced system that controls that lane's respective target, increasing safety. This system is also more time-efficient because it removes the need to check or change targets by walking down range. The range utilizes 180 air filters to keep the air fresh and clean by immediately moving gasses away from shooters.

=== Gunsmithing Department ===
Scottsdale Gun Club has a fully staffed gunsmith department that can repair or modify most makes and models. Turn around time varies depending on the services you would like performed and the level of volume.

=== Titanium Lounge ===
SGC offers different membership levels, and the highest level (Titanium) provides access to the Titanium Lounge. It has eight shooting lanes open only to Titanium Members, as well as a private attendant and a lounge area that recalls the decor of an exclusive English hunting club, complete with a pool table, big screen TV, comfortable couches, high back chairs, and a conference table. It is designed to provide a relaxing area for members while they break from shooting and a comfortable space for their guests.
