= Indian Bend Wash Area =

Superfund cleanup site in Arizona

Coordinates: 33.4803°N 111.9118°W

- Superfund site
- North Indian Bend Wash contamination area map

- Location within Maricopa County, Arizona Location within Arizona
- Location: Scottsdale and Tempe, Maricopa, Arizona

Information
- CERCLIS ID: AZD980695969
- Contaminants: Trichloroethylene
- Responsible parties: Motorola; Siemens; GlaxoSmithKline; The Salt River Project; City of Scottsdale

Progress
- Proposed: December 30, 1982
- Listed: September 8, 1983
- Construction completed: September 28, 2006
- Partially deleted: May 1, 2003

The Indian Bend Wash area is a Superfund cleanup site in Scottsdale and Tempe, Arizona. It was declared a Superfund site in 1983 after industrial solvents were discovered to have contaminated the groundwater in an approximately 13-square-mile (34 km^{2}) area. It is one of the largest EPA sites in terms of volume of groundwater treated, estimated at 61.3 billion US gallons (232,000,000 m^{3}).

During the 1960s, it was typical for companies to dispose industrial solvents directly into the ground and into dry wells. In 1981, volatile organic compounds (VOC) were detected in Tempe and Scottsdale city wells, including trichloroethylene (TCE), tetrachloroethylene (PCE), and chloroform. The wells were shut down immediately, and the area was declared a Superfund site in 1983. Potentially responsible parties Motorola, Siemens, GlaxoSmithKline, along with several smaller companies, have paid for the approximately $100 million in cleanup costs. Cleanup has consisted of several stations that pump and treat groundwater.

The area consists of two cleanup sites; the North Indian Bend Wash (NIBW) Superfund site located in Scottsdale (approximately 8 square miles) and the South Indian Bend Wash (SIBW) Superfund site located in Tempe.

For eight days in October 2007, trichloroethylene tainted water was released into the water supply of 1,500 residents of Scottsdale by the Arizona American Water Company.
