= List of historic properties in Florence, Arizona =

- Town
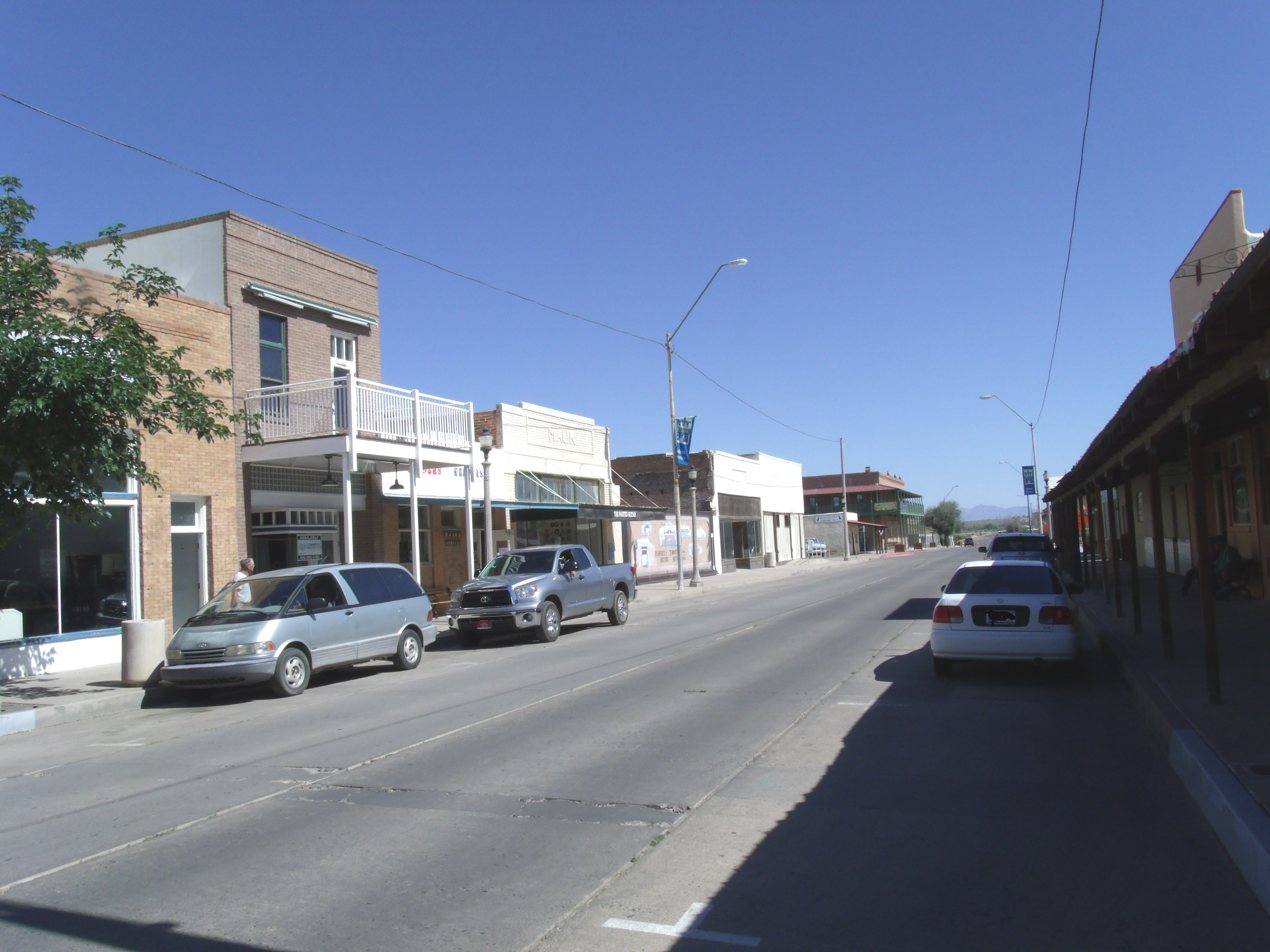
- Main Street of the original town-site of Florence. The town-site was listed in the National Register of Historic Places on October 26, 1982, reference #82001623.

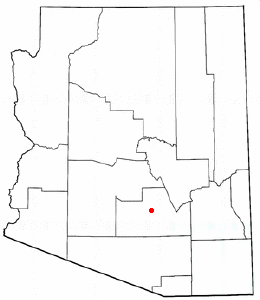
- Location in Pinal County and the state of Arizona

This is a list of historic properties in Florence, Arizona, which includes a photographic gallery of some of the remaining historic structures and monuments. Included are photographs of properties identified as once belonging to Adamsville, a small farming town, which was destroyed by a flood in 1990. Considered a ghost town by historians, it is part of Florence. Also, landmarks such as Poston Butte and the Tom Mix Monument are included.

== Brief history ==
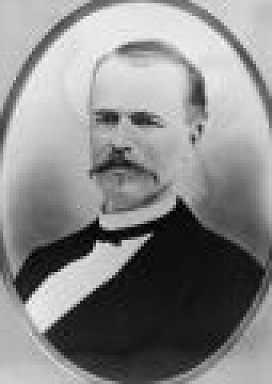
Levi Ruggles (1880)

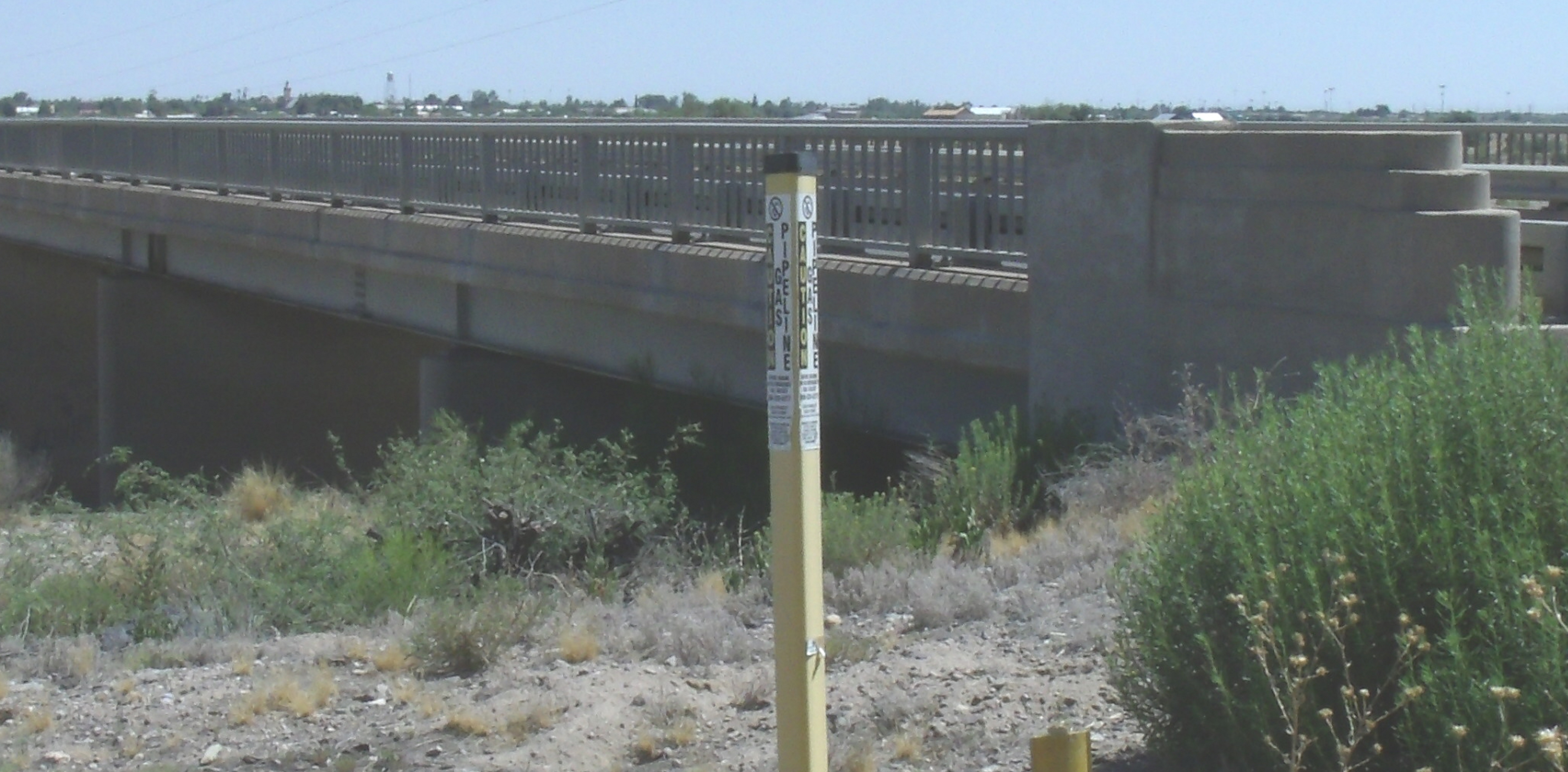
The historic Florence Bridge

Florence was founded on the southern boundary of the Gila River by Levi Ruggles, a veteran of the American Civil War. The town is sixty-one miles southeast of Phoenix, in the Pinal County of Arizona, United States. Florence, which is the county seat of Pinal County, is one of the oldest towns there and is regarded as a National Historic District with over 25 buildings listed on the National Register of Historic Places.

Many of the historical properties have been identified as such by the Florence Historic District Advisory Commission. A property identified by the commission as one with a significant historical value is then nominated for inclusion in the National Register of Historical Places. However, the local government does not have the ability to deny a demolition permit. Therefore, owners of a property listed in the National Register of Historic Places or considered as historical by the Florence Historic District Advisory Commission may demolish the historical property. The following properties have either been demolished or destroyed:

- The Devine, Ed and Lottie House – 1200 Central St.
- The P.C. Warner House – 310 3rd St.
- The Ballou-Foreman House – 500 8th St.
- The Encarnacion Avenenti House – 203 Butte St.
- The James & Mary McGhee House – 330 Butte St.
- The Moorehouse/R.H. Dairy Complex – S. Park St. (before Duran St.)
- The Encinas/Cordova House – 500 Butte St.

The Florence POW Camp was one of ten of such camps in Arizona. The first prisoners who arrived in Florence were Italian POWs. That was in May 1943. The German prisoners soon followed. Following the war, the camp served as a minimum security prison and later a hospital. The site was closed down for good in 1966. Today, nothing remains of the camp. Some artifacts left behind by the former POW inmates are on display in the First Pinal County Courthouse museum.

Images of the remaining structures of Adamsville, a ghost town, are also included. Adamsville was a farming town founded in 1870 by Fred Adams: the town had stores, homes, a post office, a flour mill and water tanks. In 1900, the Gila River overflowed and destroyed most of the town. Those who survived the flood moved to the town of Florence.

Also pictured and listed are historical artifacts that are on display and which can be found in the Pinal County Historical Society and Museum. These artifacts are related to the early history of the town, including some items related to infamous people who were imprisoned in Florence's Arizona State Prison. Among the monuments pictured are the pyramid-style tomb of Charles Debrille Poston, known as the Father of Arizona, and the Tom Mix Monument at the site of the silent film star's death.

=== The Florence Bridge ===
The historic Florence Bridge was originally built in 1885 over the Gila River. It was rebuilt in 1909 and is the third oldest Arizona Territory bridge still in use in Arizona. The bridge was designed by J.B. Girand, Arizona's first territorial engineer. The Gila River served as a part of the border between the United States and Mexico until the 1853, when the Gadsden Purchase extended American territory well south of the Gila River. The Florence Bridge, which is described by the United States Department of the Interior as one of the most important river crossings in the state, is eligible to be listed in the National Register of Historic Places.

=== Endangered properties ===
The Arizona Preservation Foundation is an agency which identifies critically endangered cultural resources of major historical significance to the state. In 2012, the foundation identified the following properties in Florence as endangered:

- The Adamsville Ruins.
- J. N. Denier Tenement House.

== Historic properties ==
=== Buildings ===
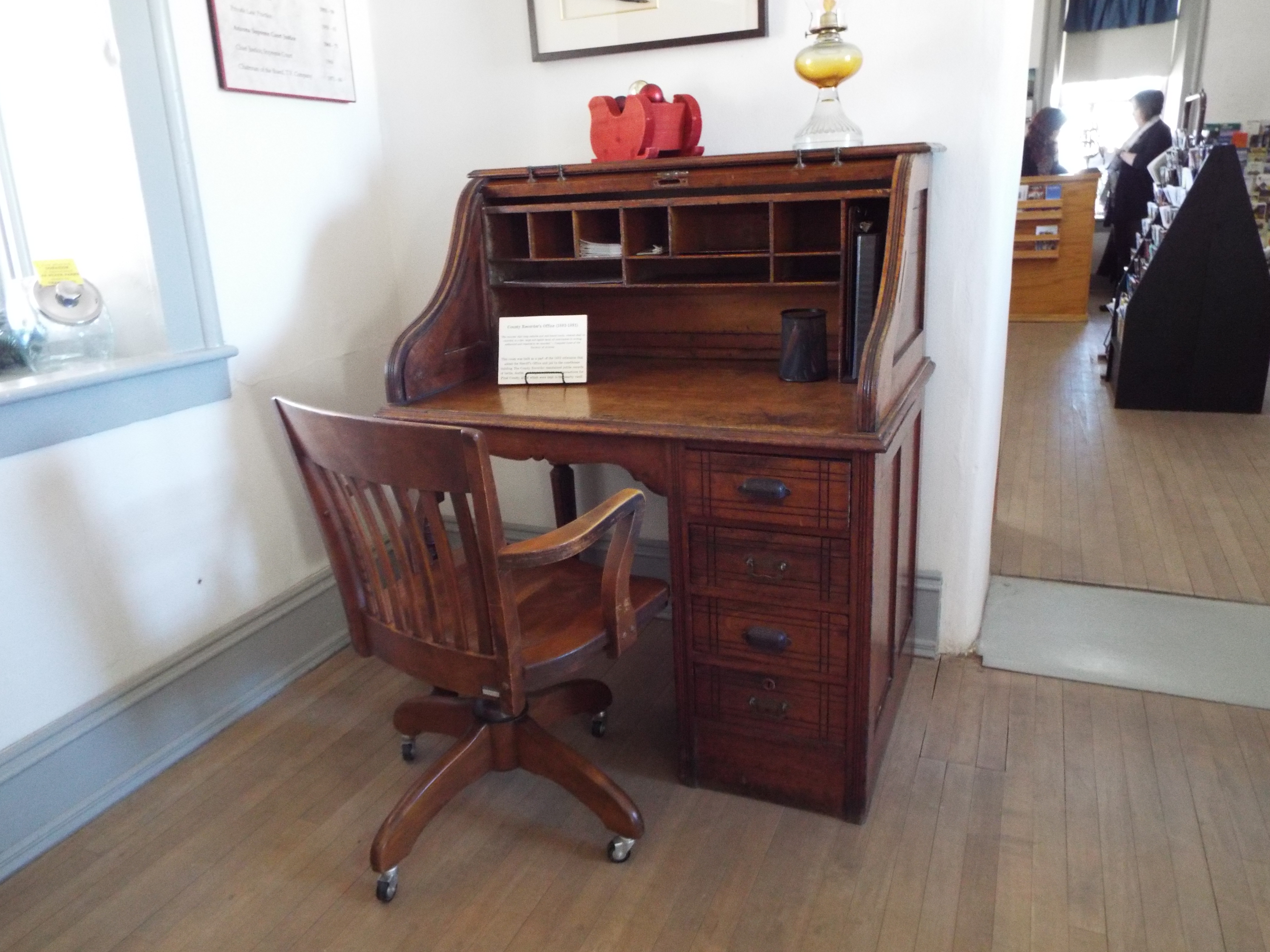
County Recorder's Office

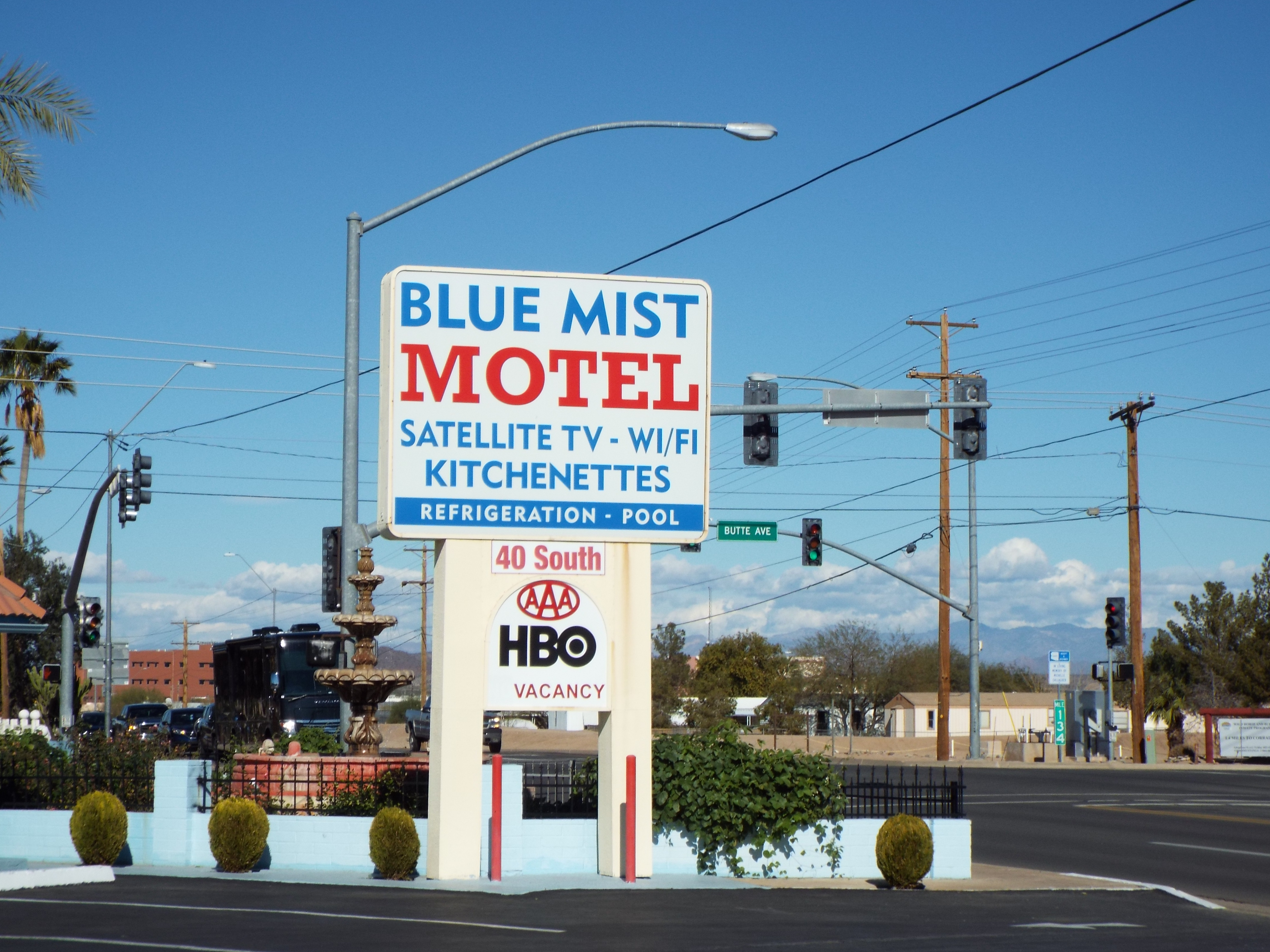
The Blue Mist Motel

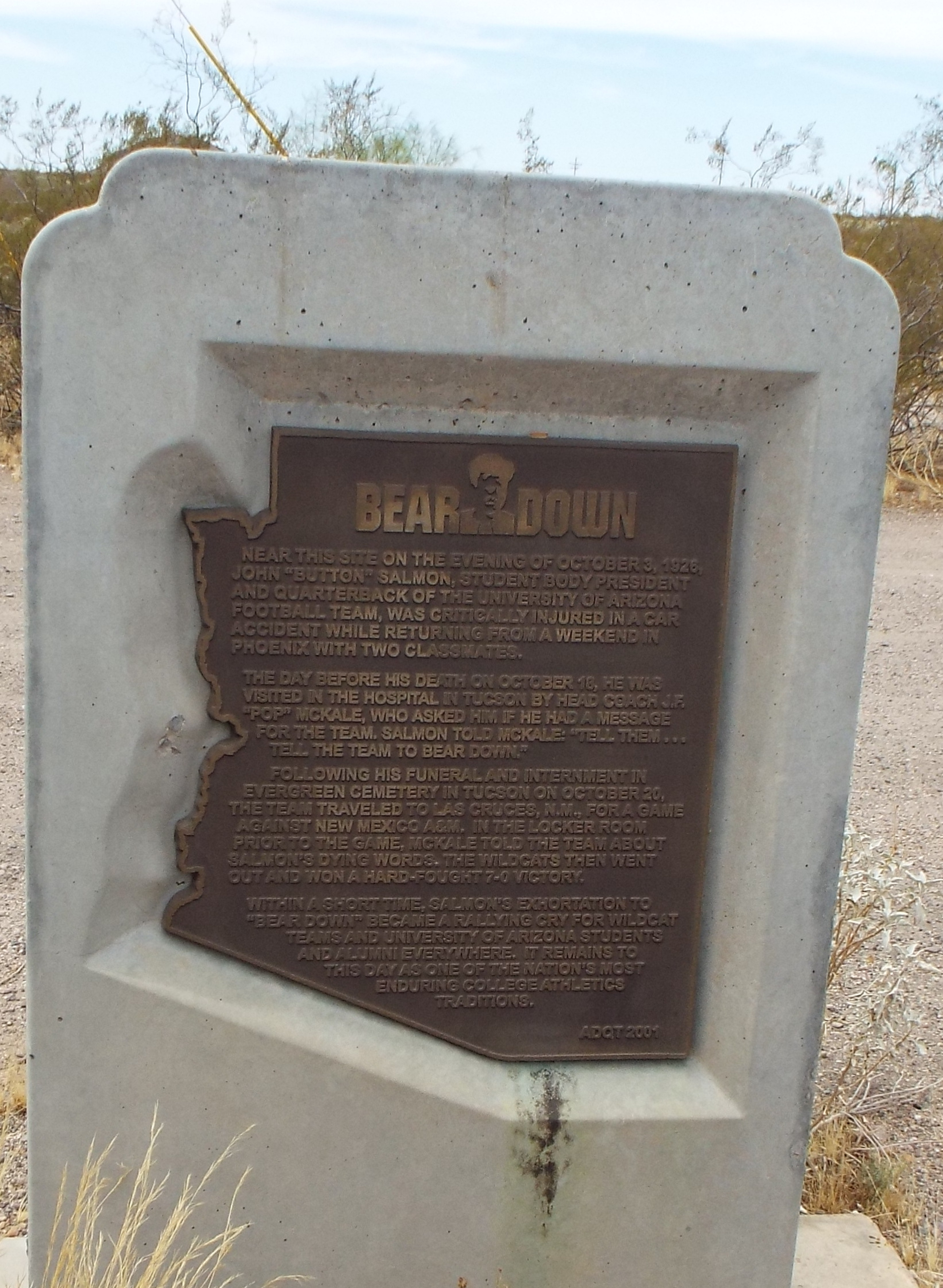
Bear Down Marker in Honor of John “Button” Salmon

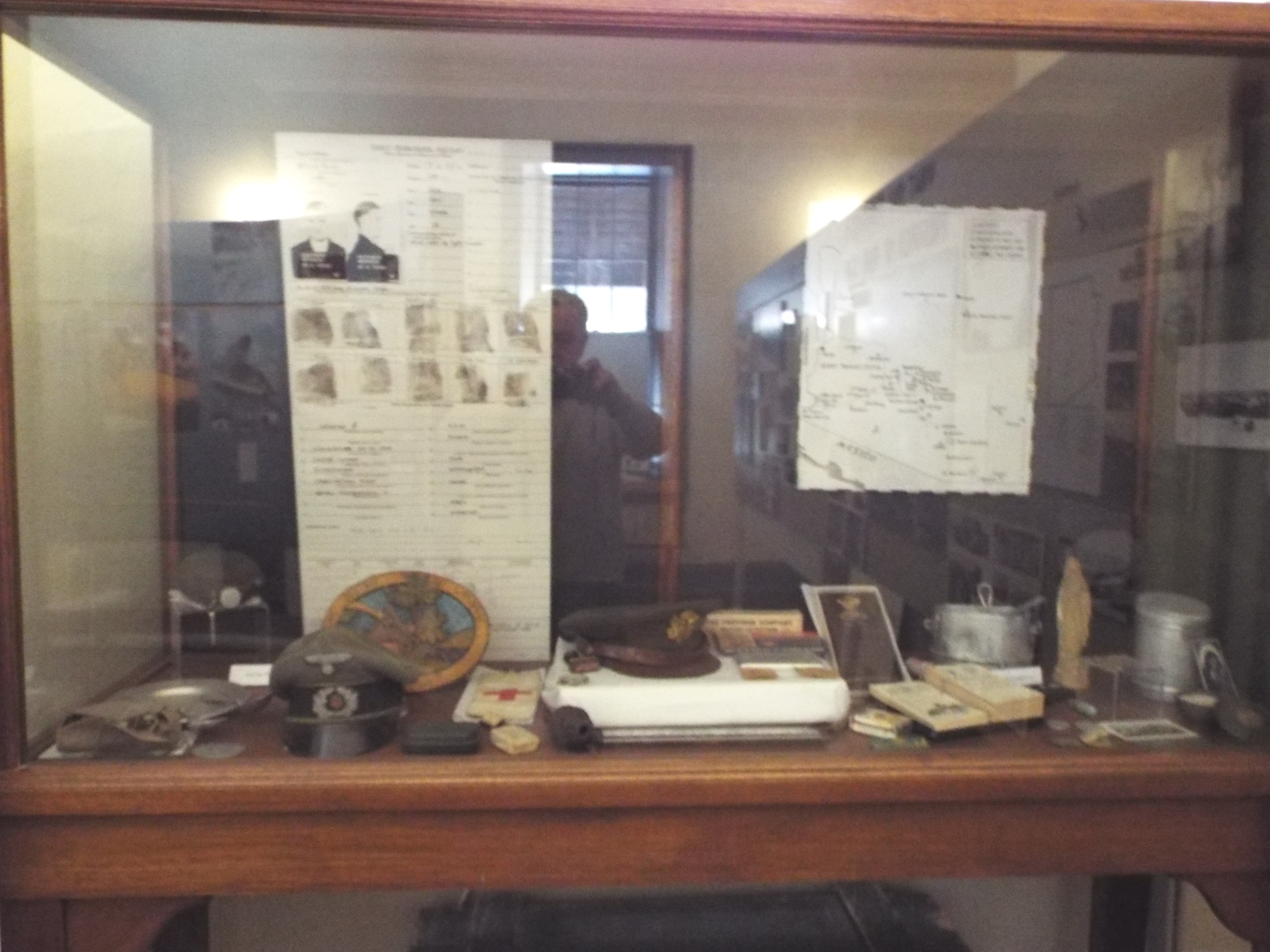
artifacts from the Florence German POW Camp

The following is a brief description of the historic buildings in Florence.

- The E.N. Fish and Co. Store Building – built in 1867 and located at 420 Quartz St. The mercantile firm of E.N. Fish & Co., with Joseph Collingwood as partner and local manager, opened Florence's first store in this building in 1868. Listed as historic by the Historic District Advisory Commission.
- The Second E.N. Fish and Co. Building – built in 1874 and located at 520 Main St. The second site of the E.N. Fish & Co. Mercantile Store became the Joseph Collingwood & Co. Store and Wells Fargo Office in 1877. As chief produce buyer, E.N. Fish & Co. was responsible for providing the economic foundation of the town's early success as an agricultural trading center. The firm played a role during Florence's mining booms by extending credit to the Silver King Mine. The west wing contained hotel rooms and an office. A saloon and dining room were in the south wing. From early statehood until the mid-1940s, the west wing contained dwellings and became the American Legion Post headquarters in 1944. Listed as Historic by the Historic District Advisory Commission.
- The Charles Rapp Saloon Building – built in 1875 and located at 361 Main Street. Chicago-born Charles Rapp advertised the building as featuring an "Elegant Club & Reading Room in Connection with the Bar." The building was the first location of John Keating's famous "Tunnel Saloon" from 1886 to 1888. Listed as Historic by the Historic District Advisory Commission.
- The Silver King Hotel – built in 1876 and located at 24 W. 6th St. The building was an L-shaped adobe building with a gable roof and walls that were not plastered. The hotel was built for William Long, a partner in the Silver King Mine. Listed as Historic by the Historic District Advisory Commission.
- The First Pinal County Courthouse – built in 1876 and located at W. 24 Ruggle St. Levi Ruggles designed and built this adobe building in 1878. The local "Vigilance Committee" stormed the sheriff's office in this building in 1888, dragged two men from their cells and hanged them in the corridor of the jail. It served as a courthouse. Since then, it has functioned as a hospital, health center, home for the elderly, and a museum. Listed in the National Register of Historic Places on July 30, 1974, reference #74000461.
- The Jean Baptiste Residence/ Lone Star Store – built in 1878 and located at 220 Ruggles Street. Jean Baptiste was a farmer from the French region of Burgundy, and former artilleryman with Maximilian's occupation army in Mexico. Listed as Historic by the Historic District Advisory Commission.
- The John Nicolas's New Beer Hall – built in 1880 and located at 180 Bailey Street. The north portion of the house became Nicolas's "New Beer Hall". It has also been used as a newspaper printing office. Listed as Historic by the Historic District Advisory Commission.
- The Jean Avenenti Building – built in 1886 and located at 289 Main Street. Italian immigrant Juan Avenenti purchased this property in 1886 from Frank M. Griffen. Previously, it had belonged to Florence pioneers Levi Ruggles and Charles Douglas. Avenenti, a grocer, butcher and rancher, built the present structure for a meat market. Listed as Historic by the Historic District Advisory Commission.
- Florence High School – built in 1887 and located in 1000 S. Main St. Listed in the National Register of Historic Places on June 22, 1987, reference #87001306.
- The John Nicolas Saloon – built in 1889 and located in 46 E. 11th St. Designed by prominent Arizona architect James M. Creighton, this is the oldest standing fired-brick building in Florence. French-born rancher-farmer John Nicholas moved his saloon to this building soon after its construction in 1889. Listed as Historic by the Historic District Advisory Commission.
- The Conrad Brunenkant City Bakery Building – built in 1890 and located in 291 Bailey St. The two story red brick building was built for Conrad Brunenkant, a Dutch-born baker and grocer. Listed as Historic by the Historic District Advisory Commission.
- The Gentry's Florence Market building – built in 1890 and located at 368 main Street. The smaller addition was built in 1917 and its address is 374 N. Main St.
- The Second Pinal County Courthouse – built in 1891 and is located in 135 Pinal St. The Courthouse is the most important architectural landmark in Florence and the most outstanding surviving example of the American-Victorian Style in Central Arizona. The building was designed by Arizona architect James M. Creighton, who was among the Territory's first architects. Three notorious women were presented before this court. They were Pearl Heart, Eva Dugan and Winnie Ruth Judd. Listed in the National Register of Historic Places on August 2, 1978, reference #78000568.
- La Paloma Bar – built in 1912 and located at 255 Main St. Originally a saloon, the building served as a pool hall during statewide Prohibition. Listed as Historic by the Historic District Advisory Commission.
- The White and McCarthy Lumber and Hardware Building – built in 1914 and located in 290 Main St. Listed as Historic by the Historic District Advisory Commission.
- The Popular Store/ Mandells Dept. Store Building – built in 1915 and located in 291 Main St. It belonged to C.G. Powell' whose "The Popular Store," were specialists in ready-to-wear clothing. Kaufmann Mandell purchased the building in 1919 and operated the Mandell's Department Store. Listed as Historic by the Historic District Advisory Commission.
- The Mauk Building – built in 1925 and located in 360 Main St. This building was one of three built by early movie-house mogul and later U.S. Marshal, George Mauk. A portion of the Isis Theater was located on the same site. Listed as Historic by the Historic District Advisory Commission.
- The Florence Women's Club Building – built in 1929 and located in 231 Willow St. Listed as Historic by the Historic District Advisory Commission.
- The Florence Town Hall Building – built in 1948 and located in 130 Main St. The town hall also served as a police and fire station. The Town Hall was relocated in the 1980s. Listed as Historic by the Historic District Advisory Commission.
- The Blue Mist Motel – built in 1946 and located at 40 S. Pinal Parkway was the site of an infamous crime. Robert Moormann was in prison in Florence serving a sentence of 9-years to life for kidnapping. He was granted a 3-day furlough in January 1984. He stayed with his mother in room 22 at the Blue Mist Motel. On January 13, 1984, Moormann bought a buck knife, a steak knife and some food. He then killed and dismembered his mother, disposing of the body parts in dumpsters throughout Florence. He was executed on February 29, 2012.

== Historic structures pictured ==
The following are the images of the historic structures in Florence and its surrounding areas.

Historic buildings and bridge
(National Register of Historic Places)
(Florence Historic District Advisory Commission.)

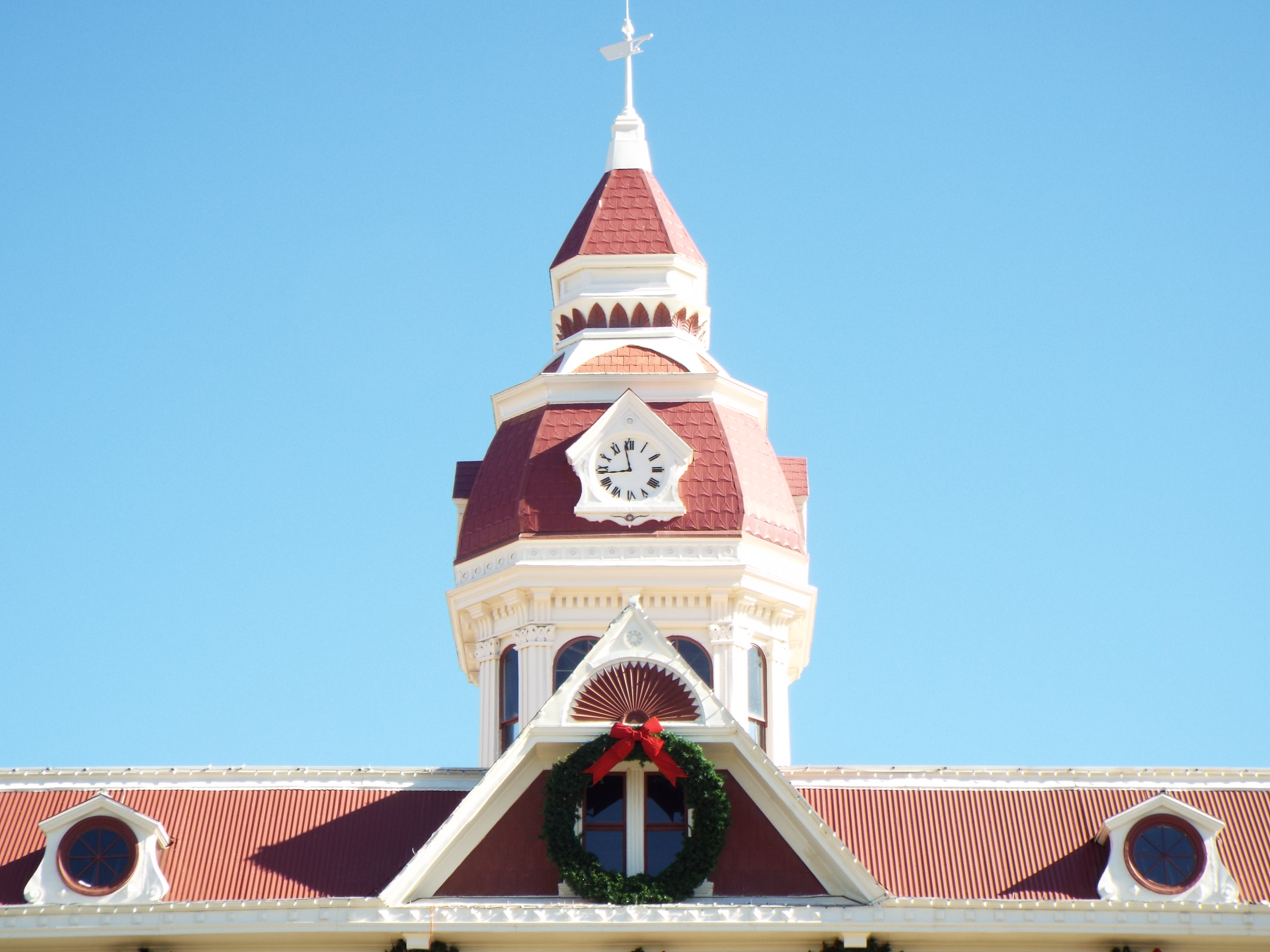
Second Pinal County Courthouse Clock

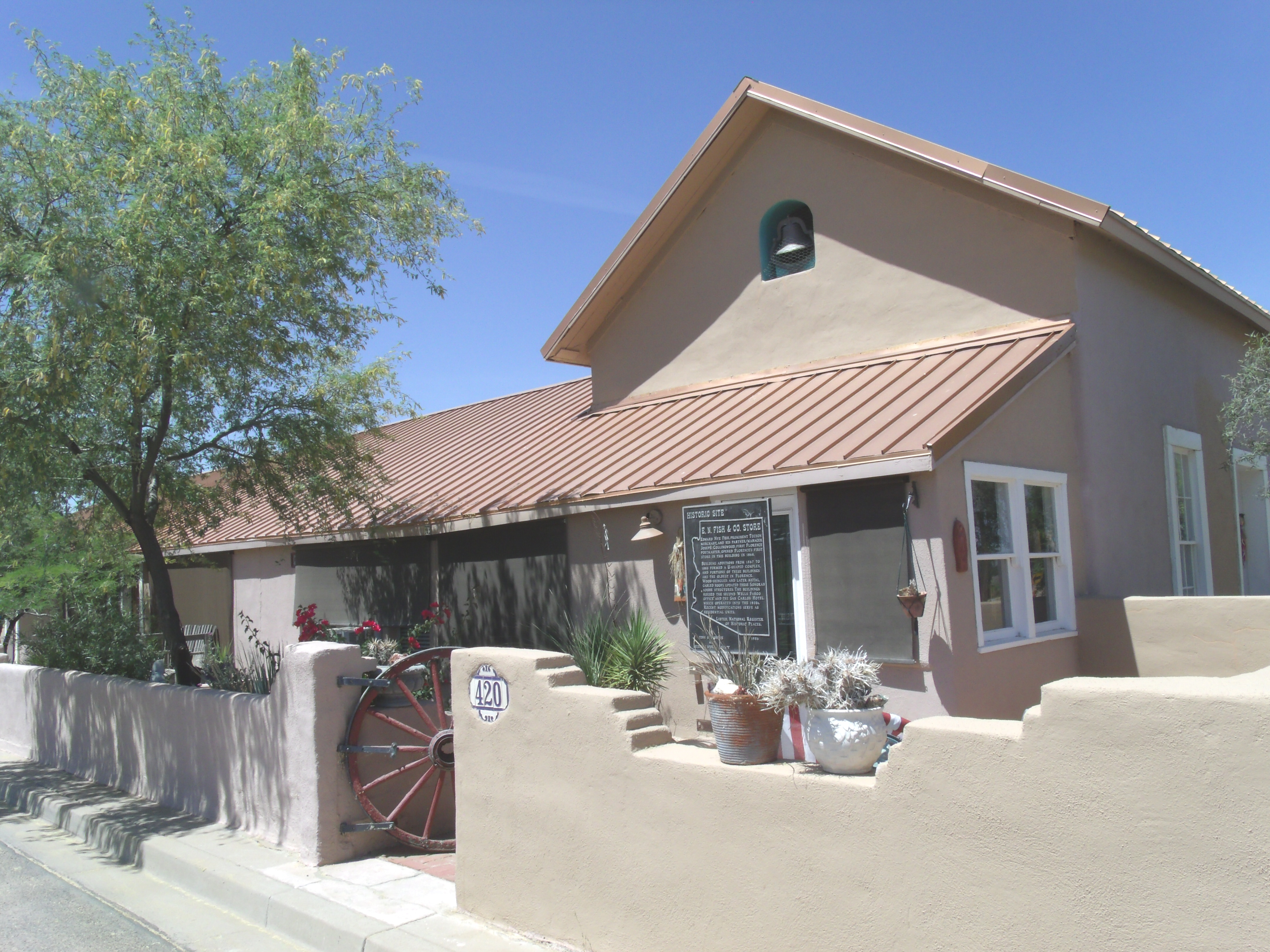
The E.N. Fish and Co. Store Building.

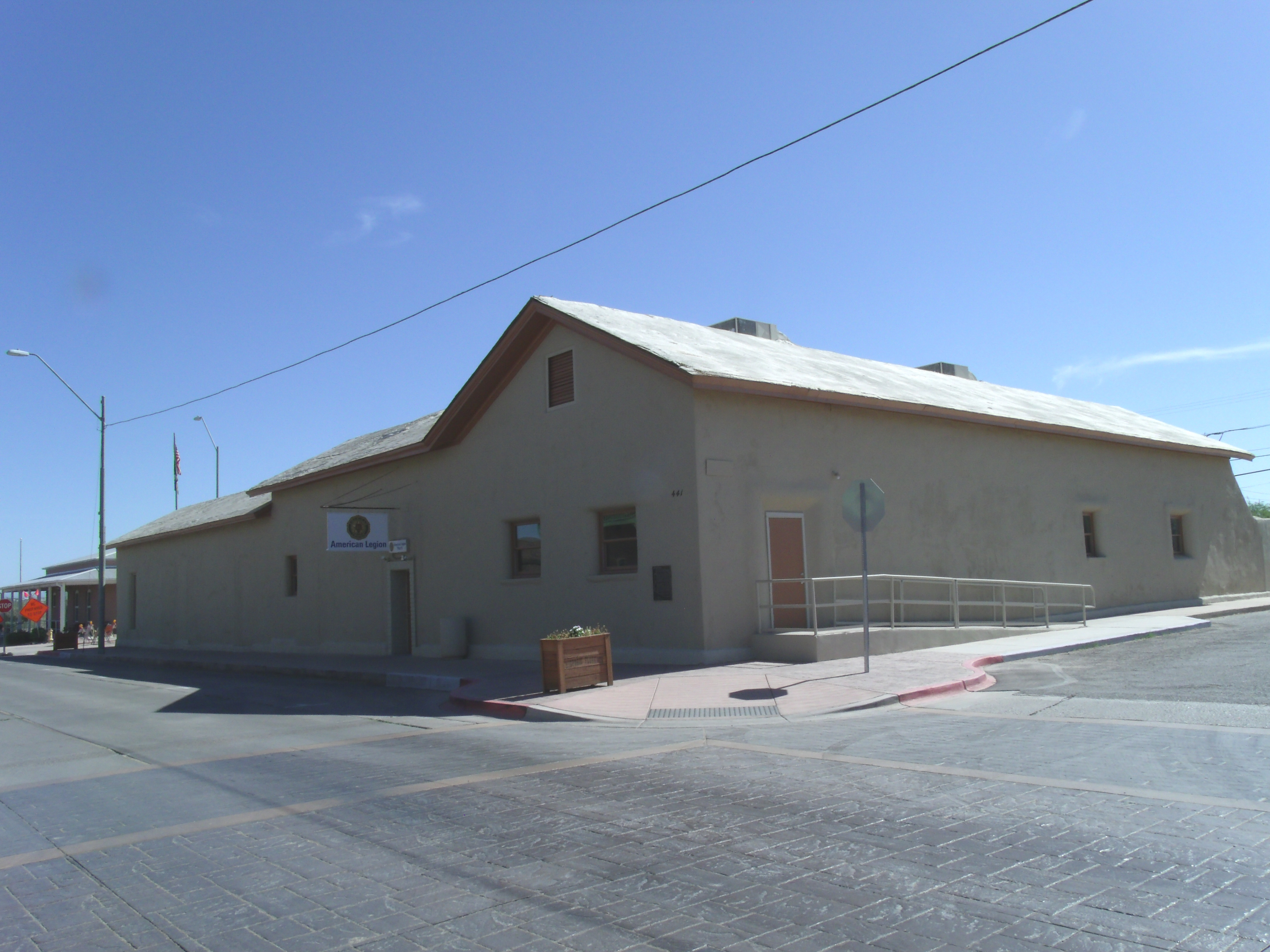
The Second E.N. Fish and Co. Building.

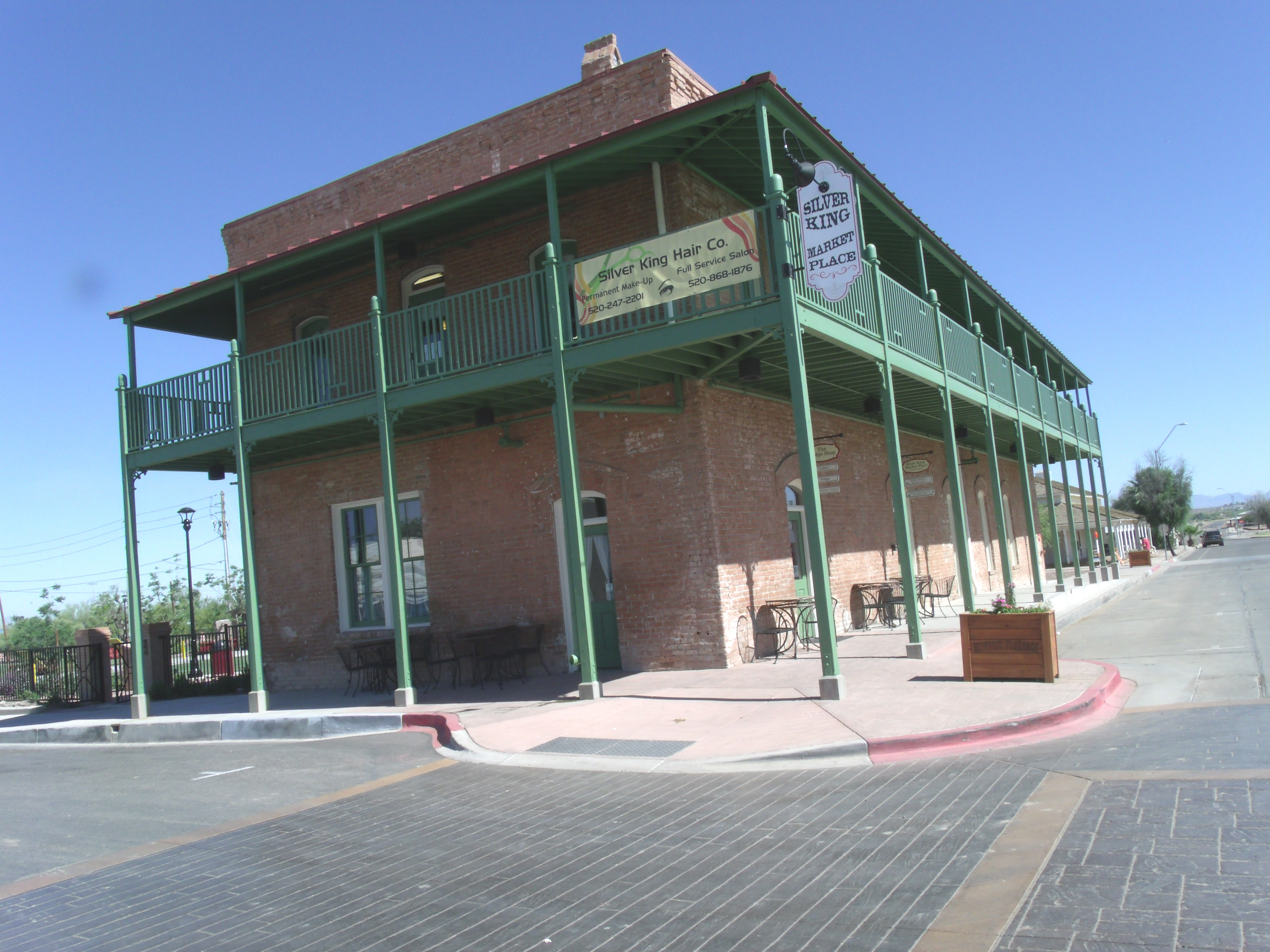
The Silver King Hotel.

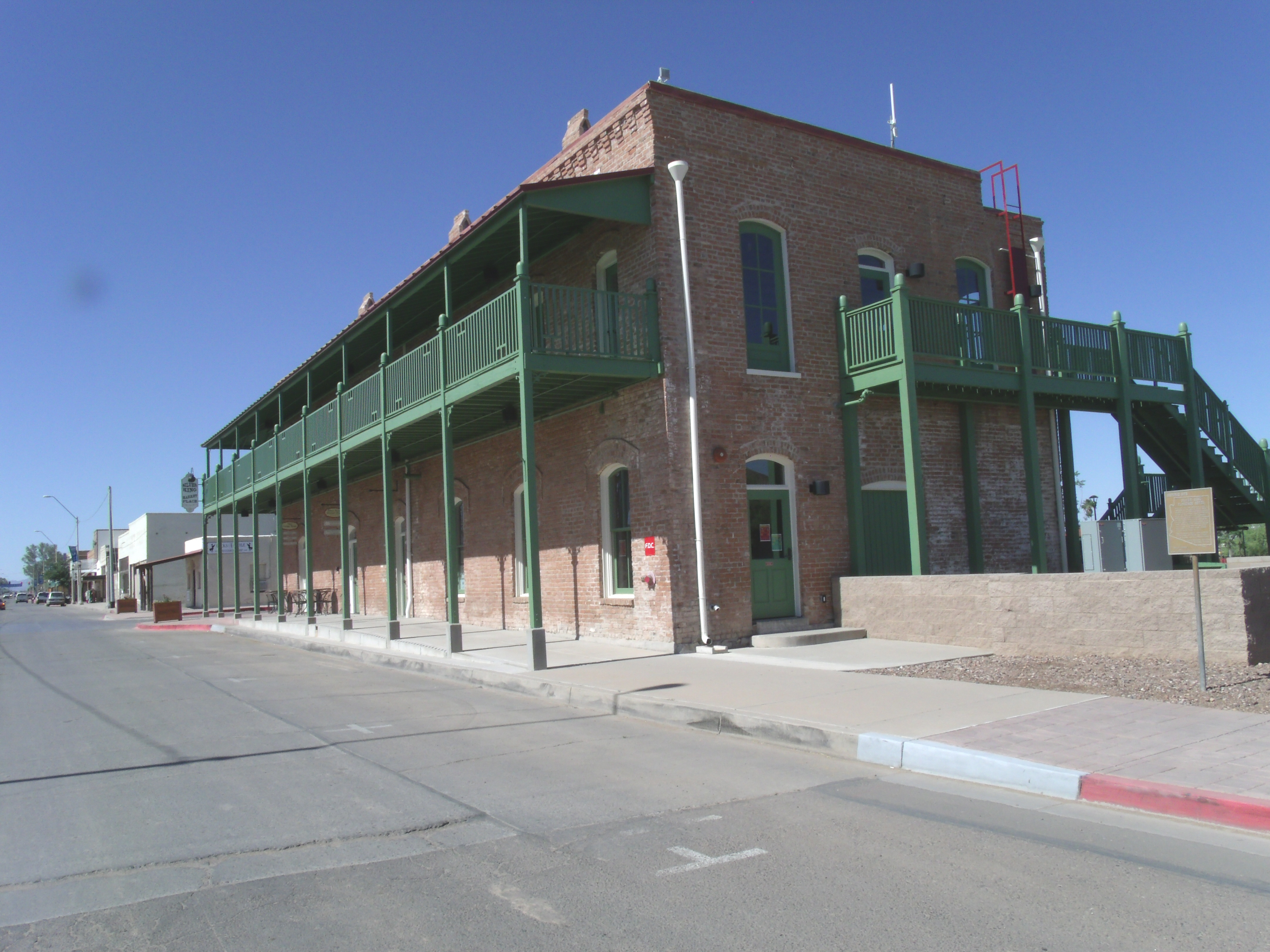
Different view of the Silver King Hotel.

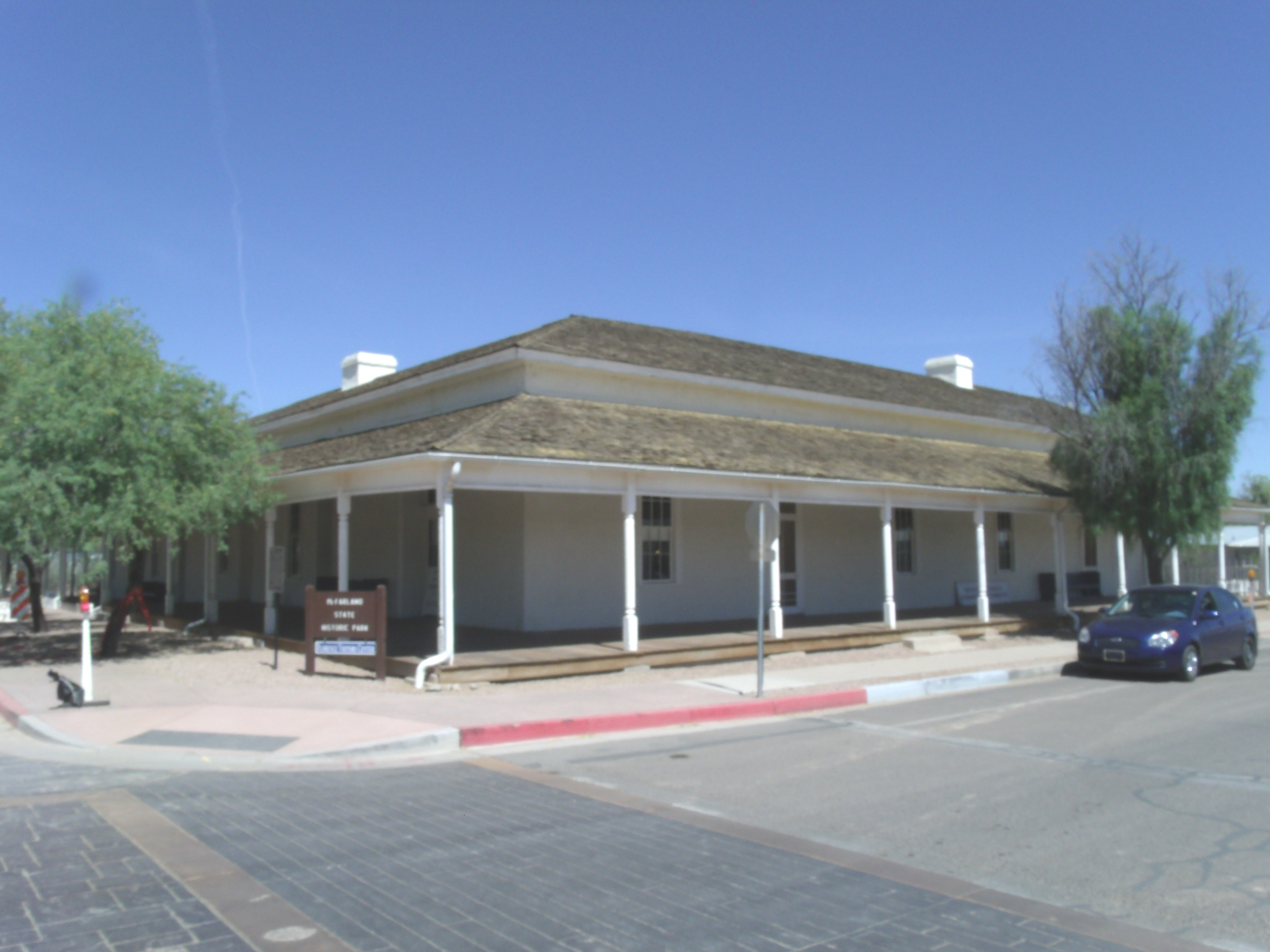
The First Pinal County Courthouse.

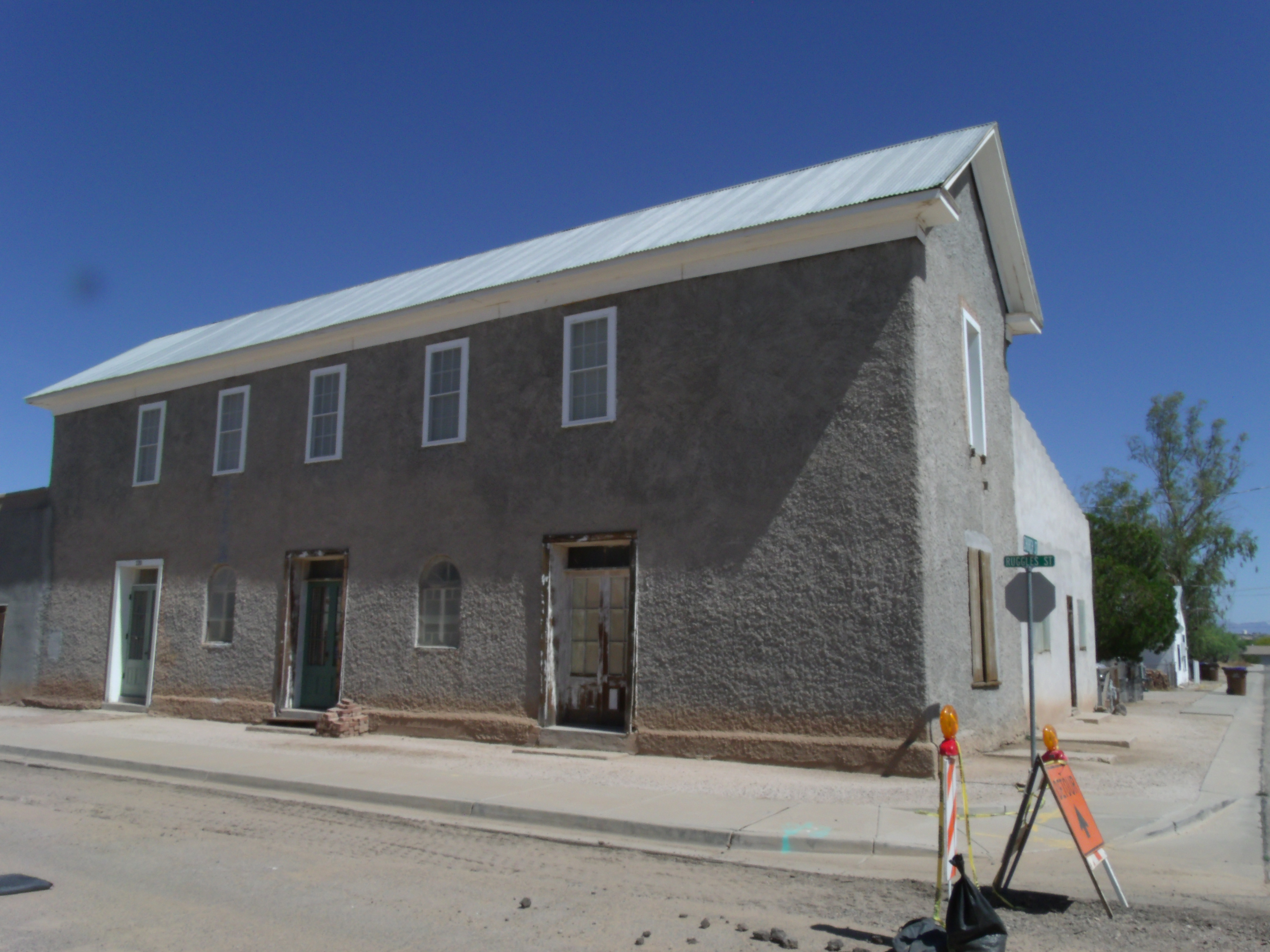
The Jean Baptiste Residence/ Lone Star Store.

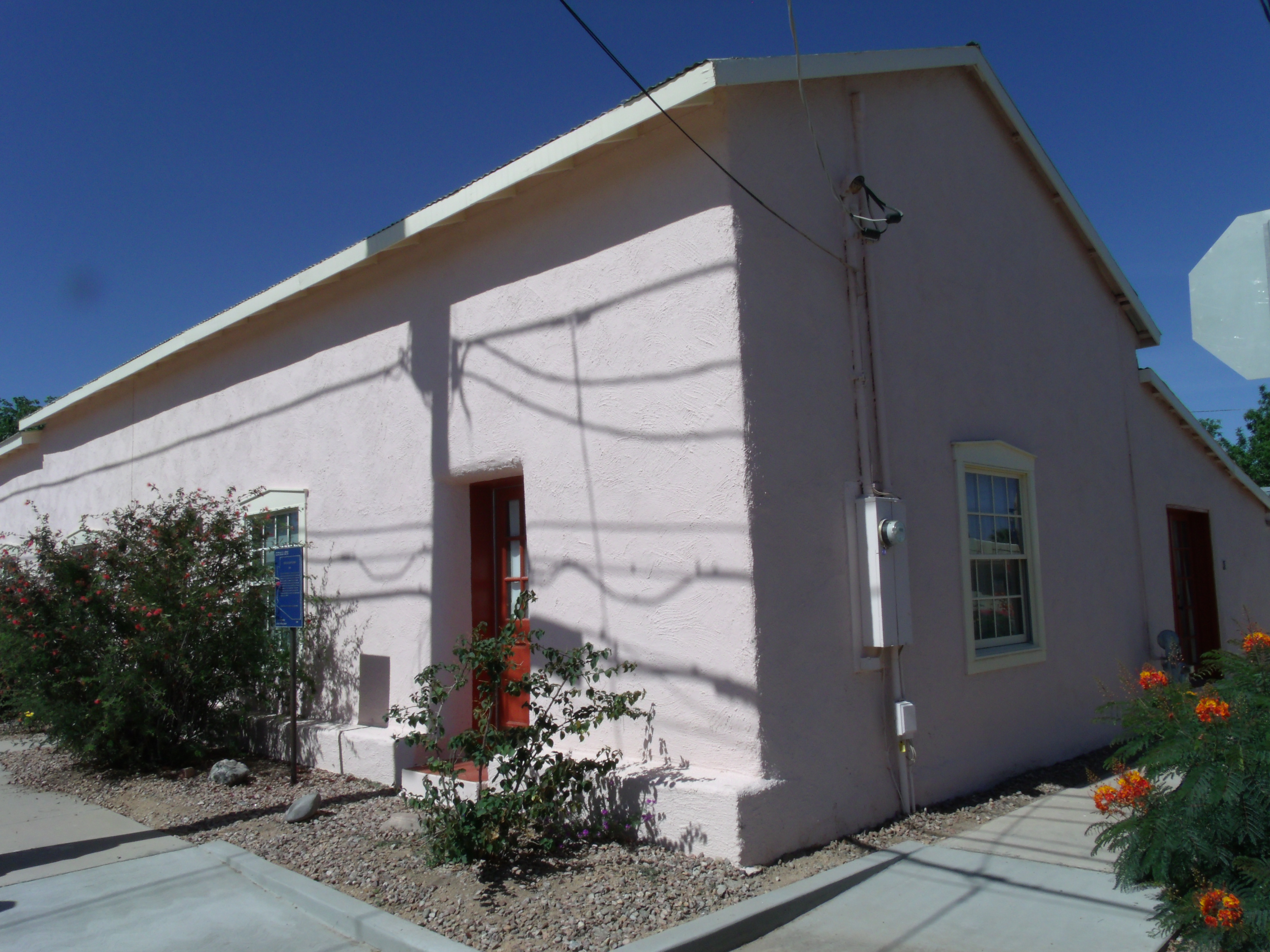
The John Nicolas's New Beer Hall.

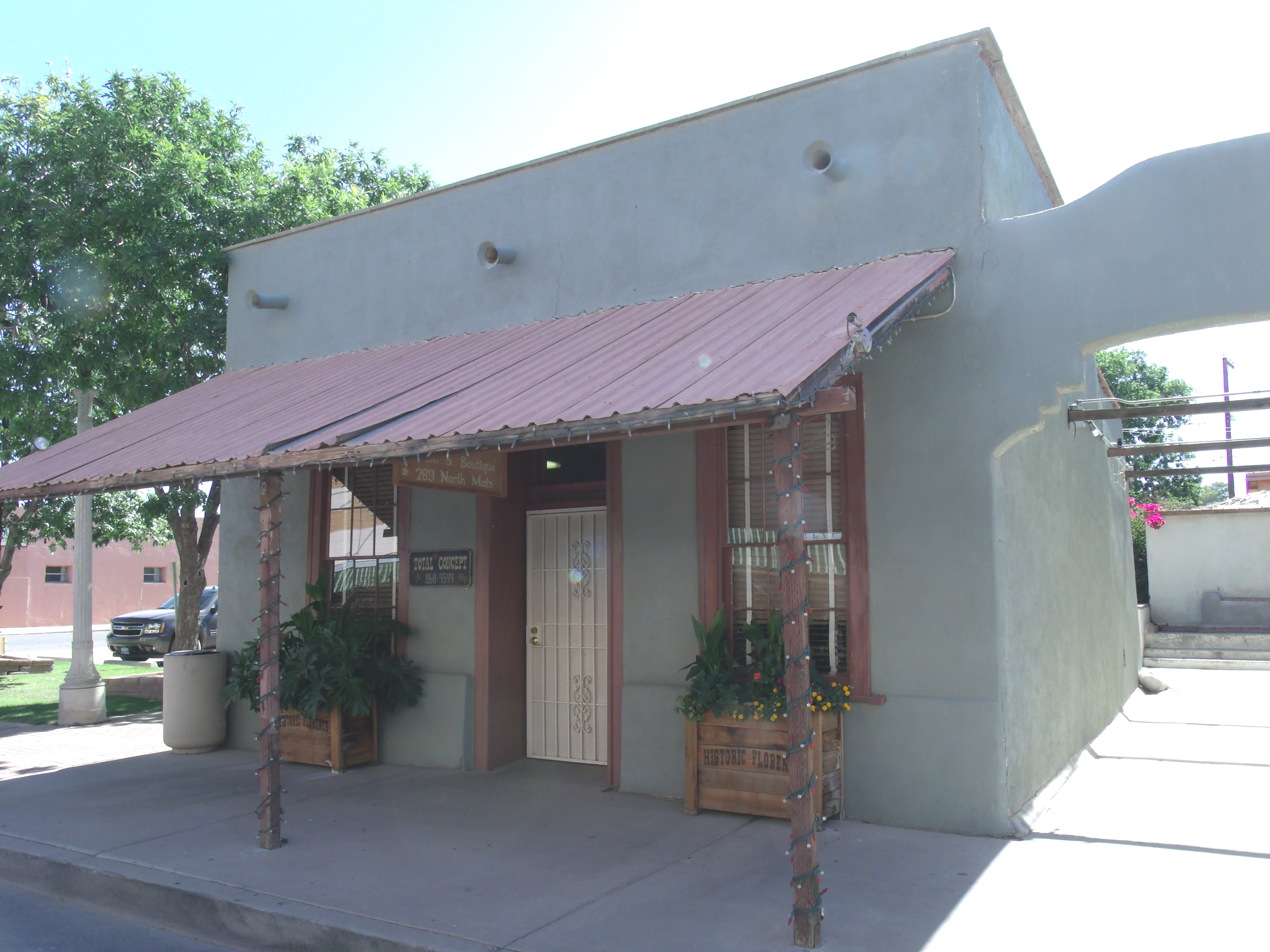
The Jean Avenenti Building.

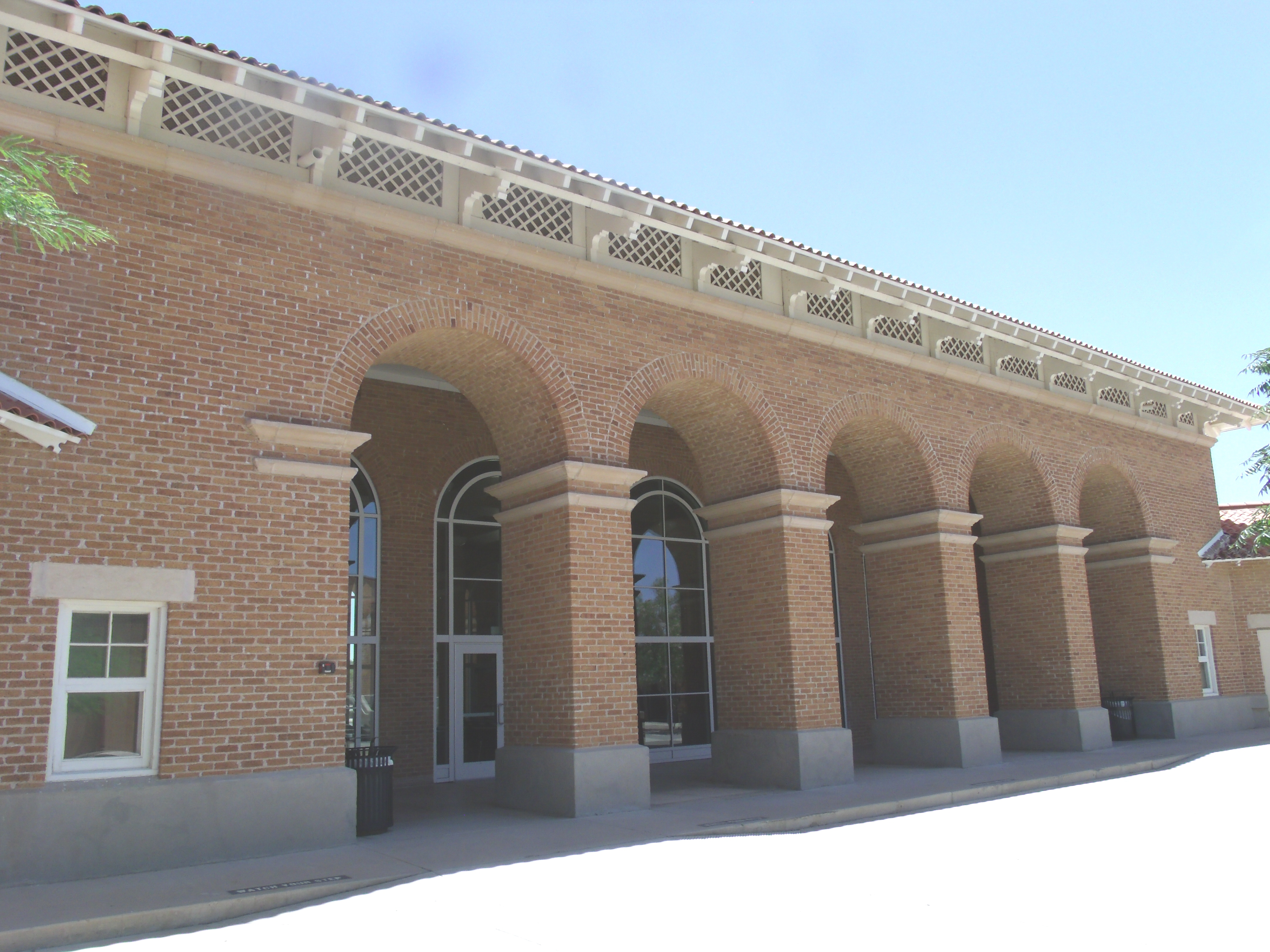
Florence High School.

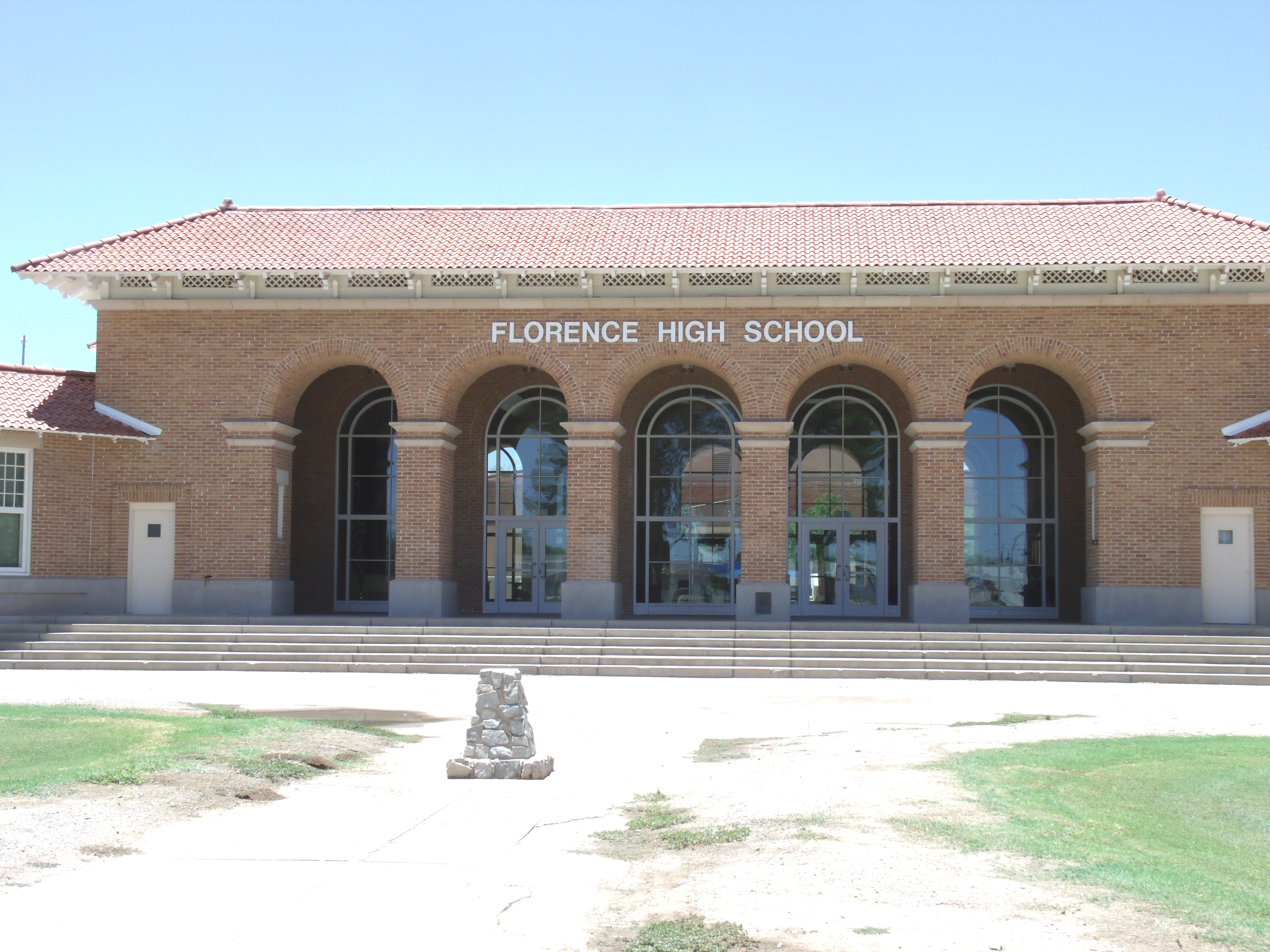
Different view of Florence High School.

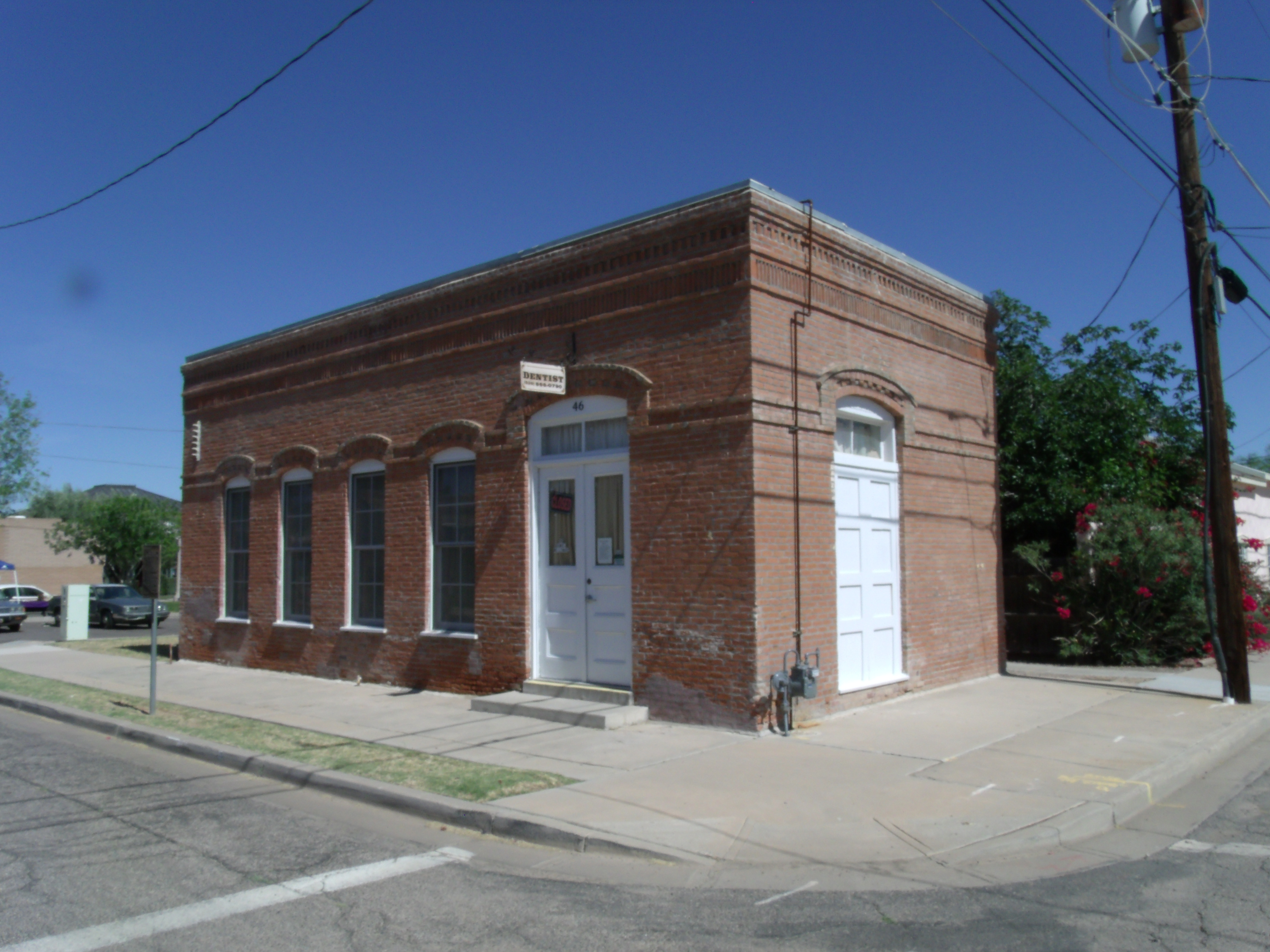
The John Nicolas Saloon.

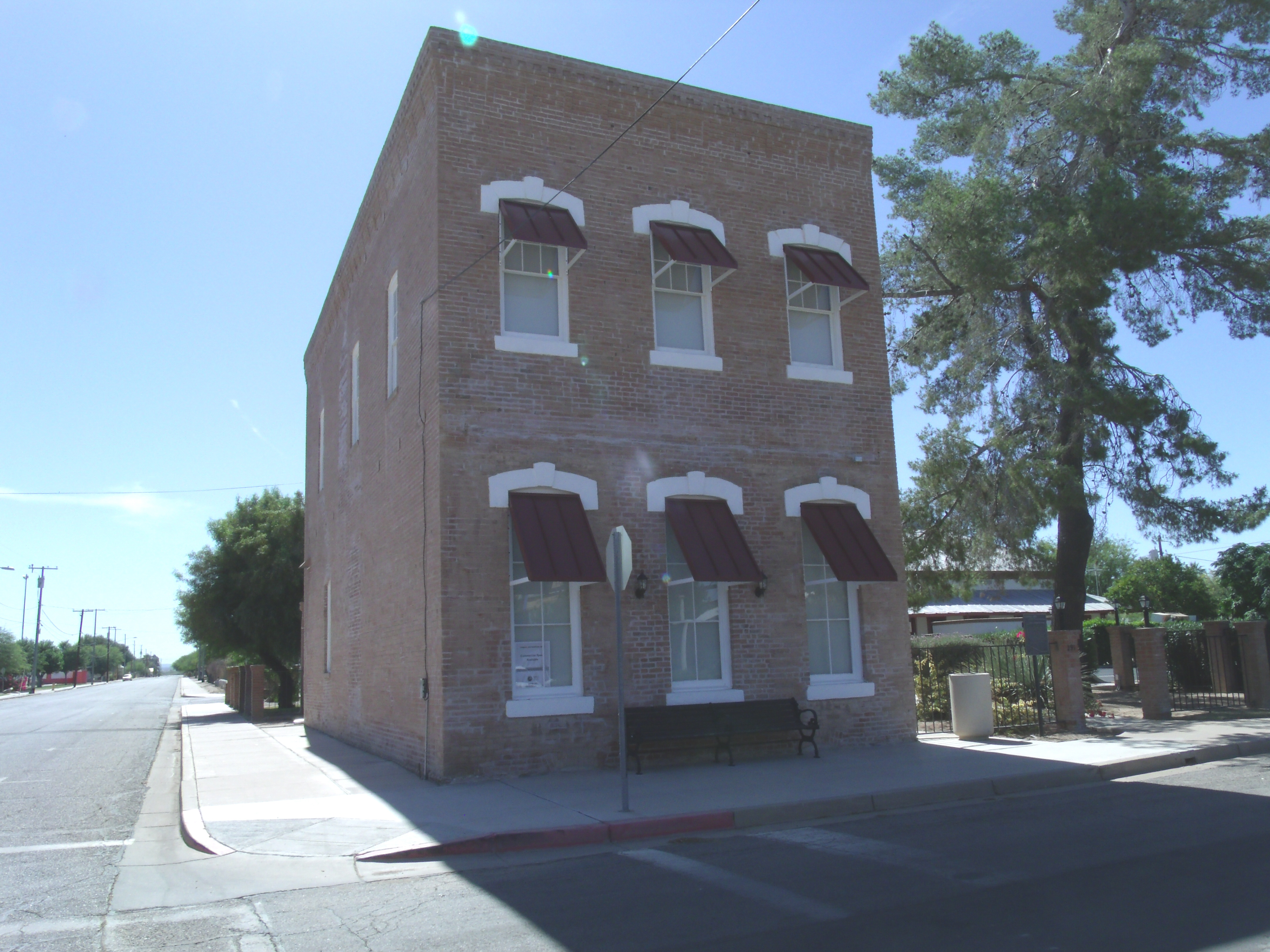
The Conrad Brunenkant City Bakery Building.

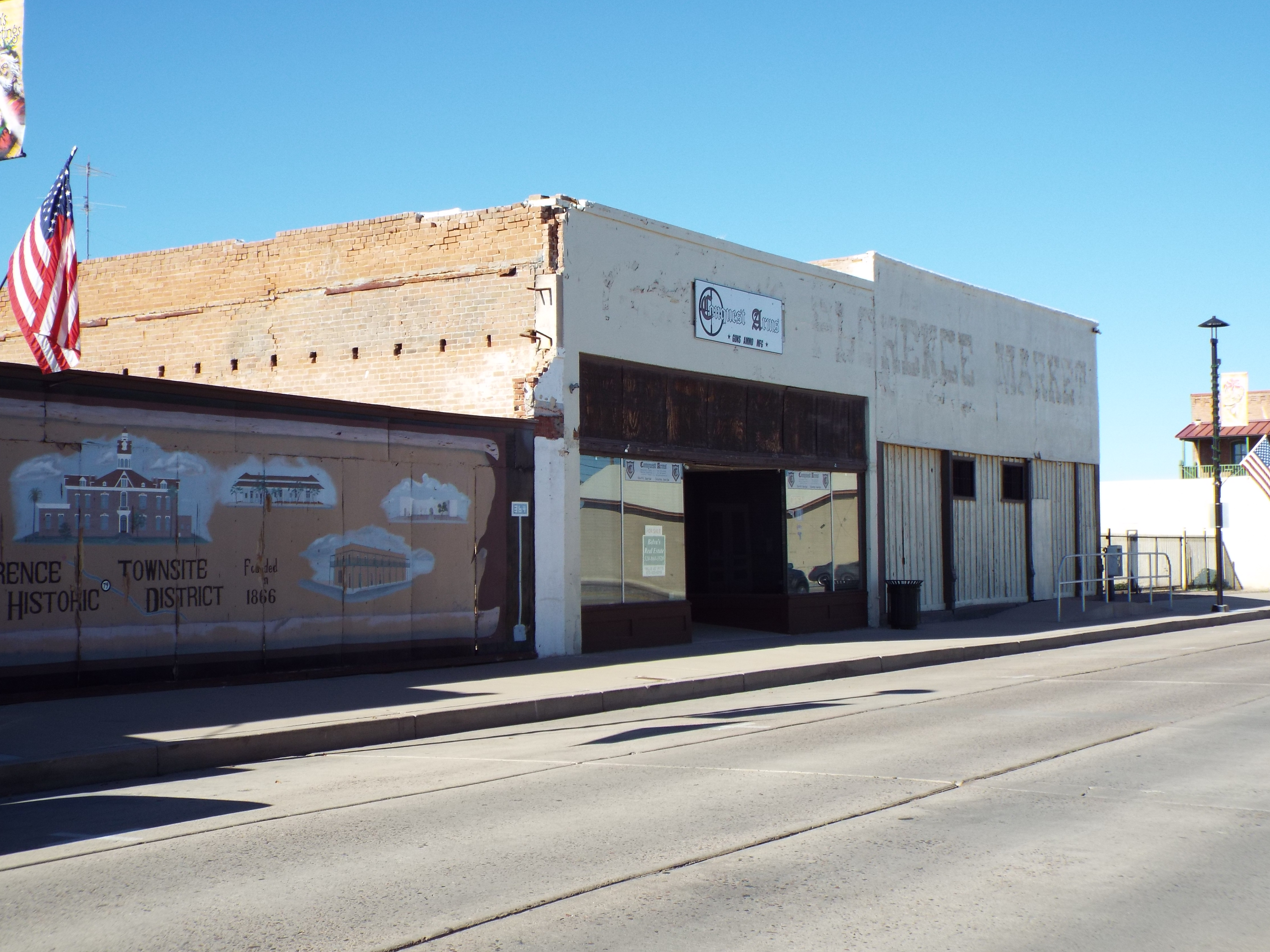
Gentry’s Florence Market.

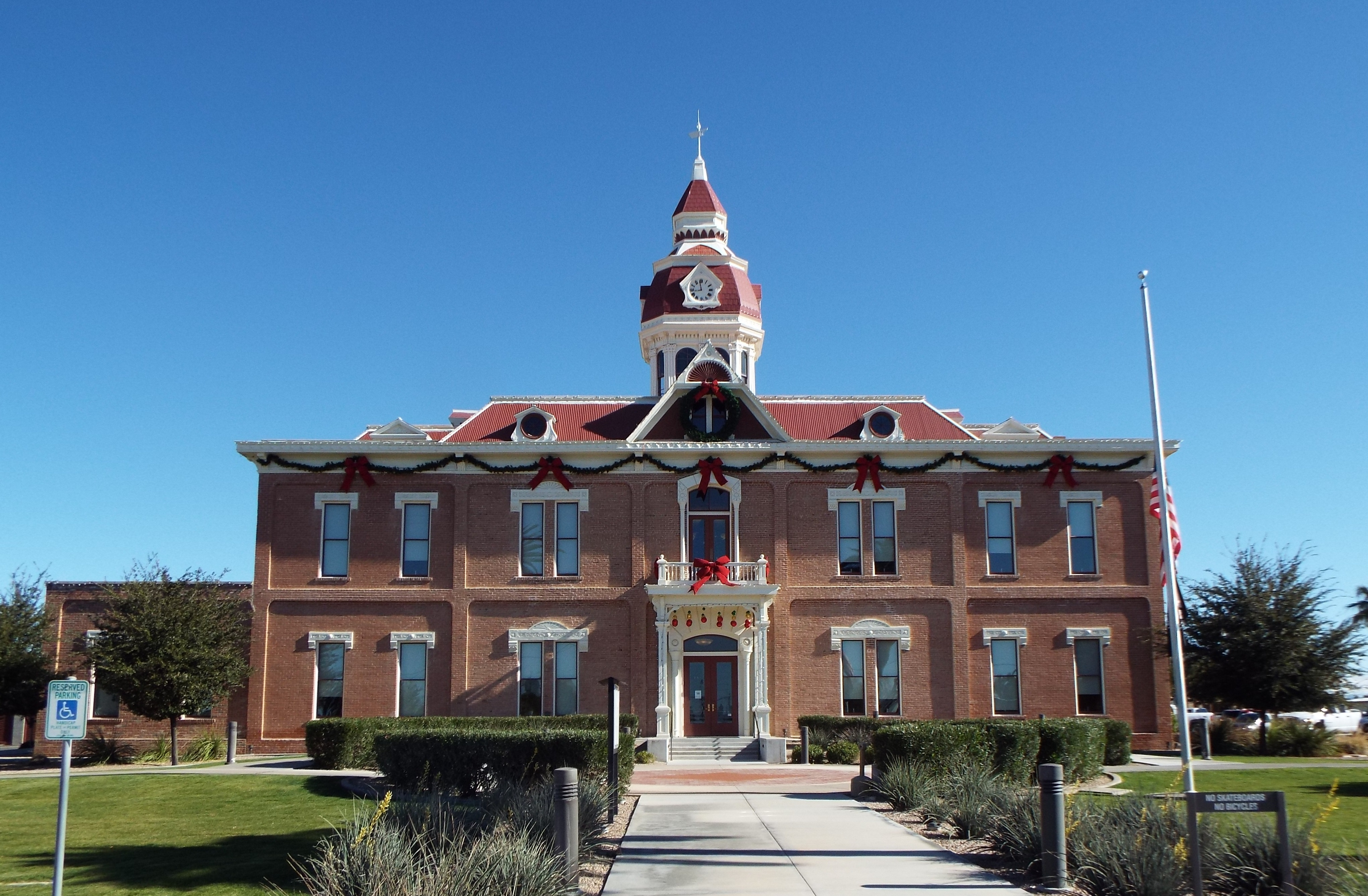
The Second Pinal County Courthouse.

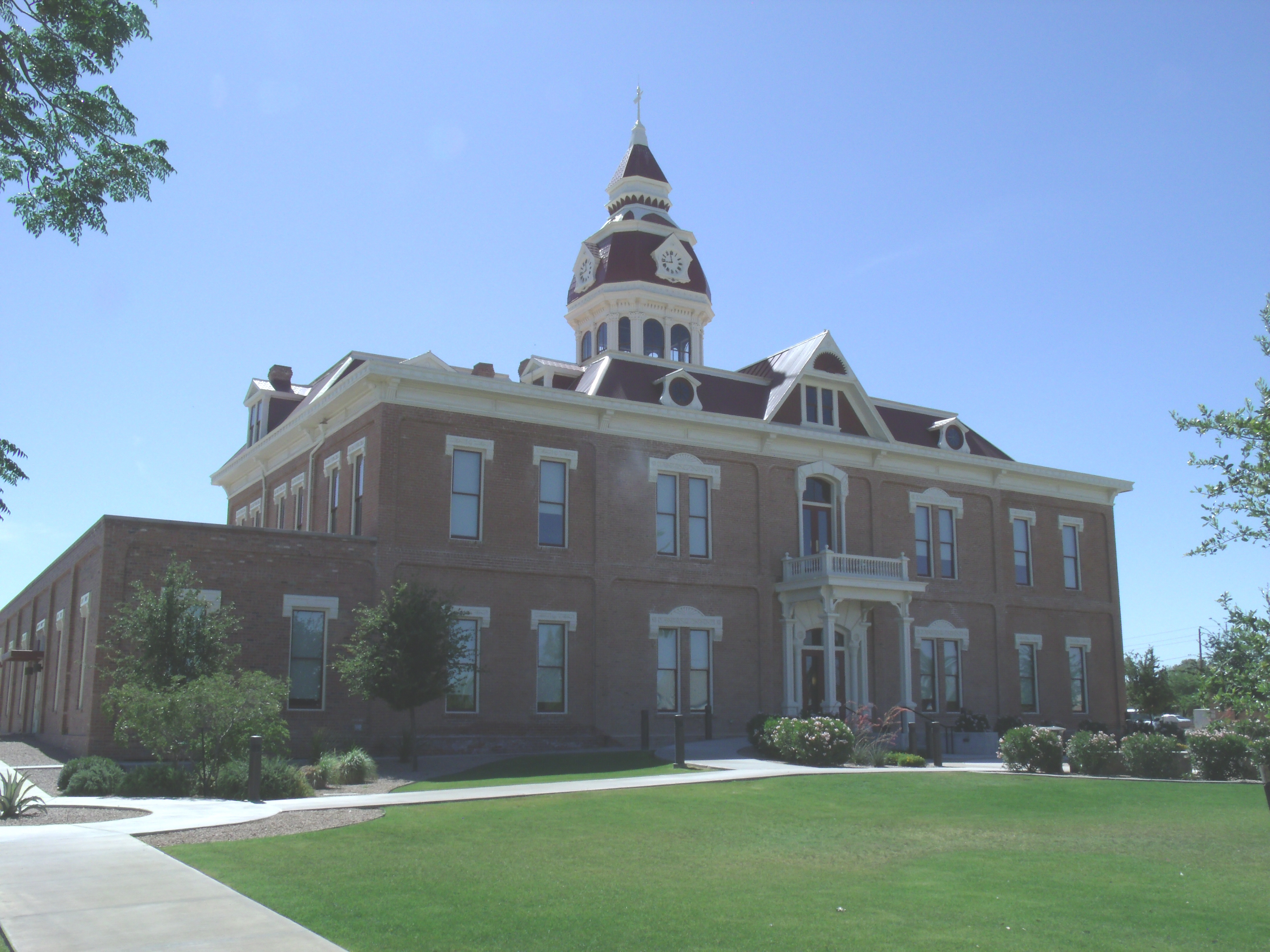
Different view of the Second Pinal County Courthouse.

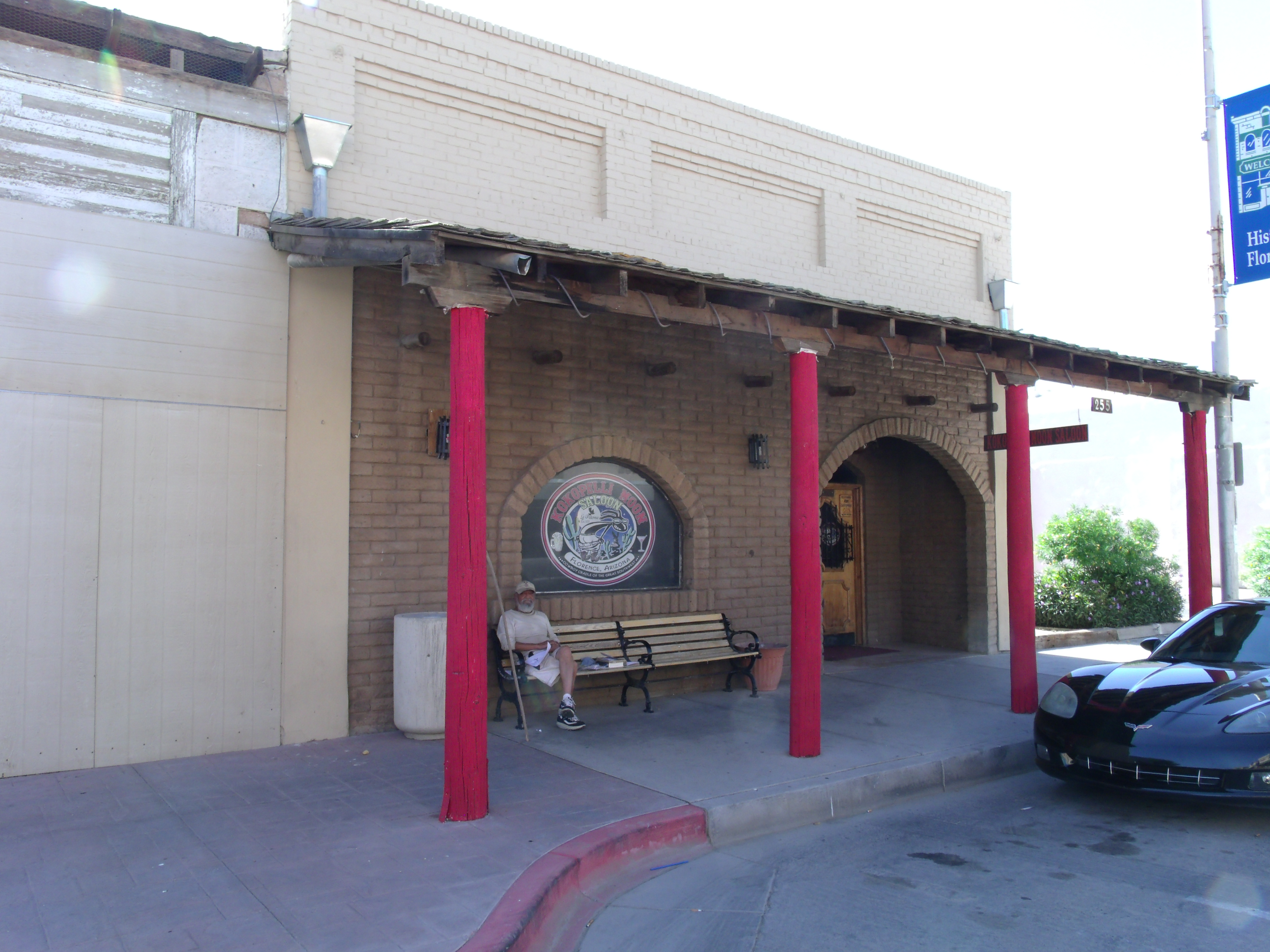
La Paloma Bar.

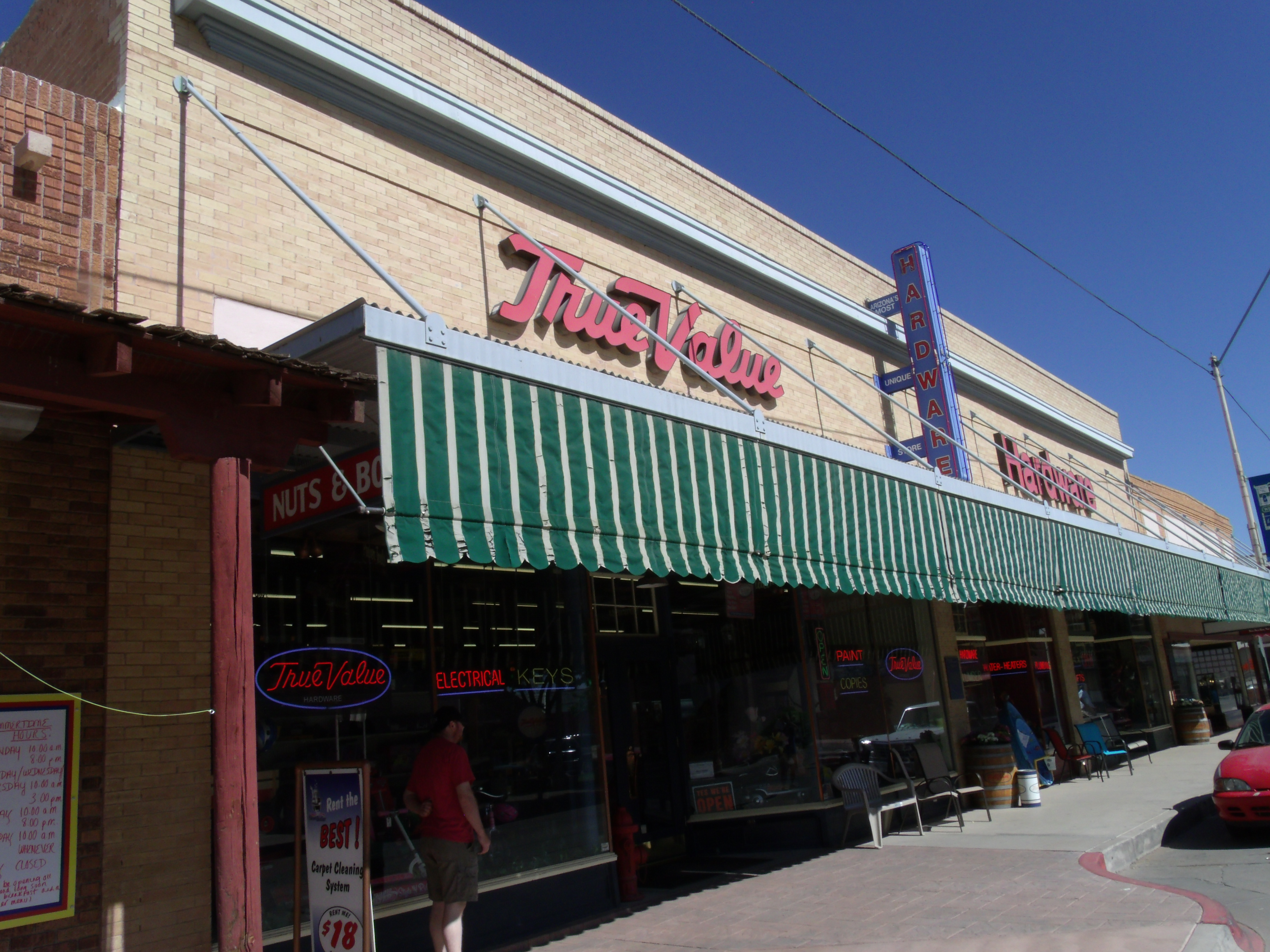
The White and McCarthy Lumber and Hardware Building.

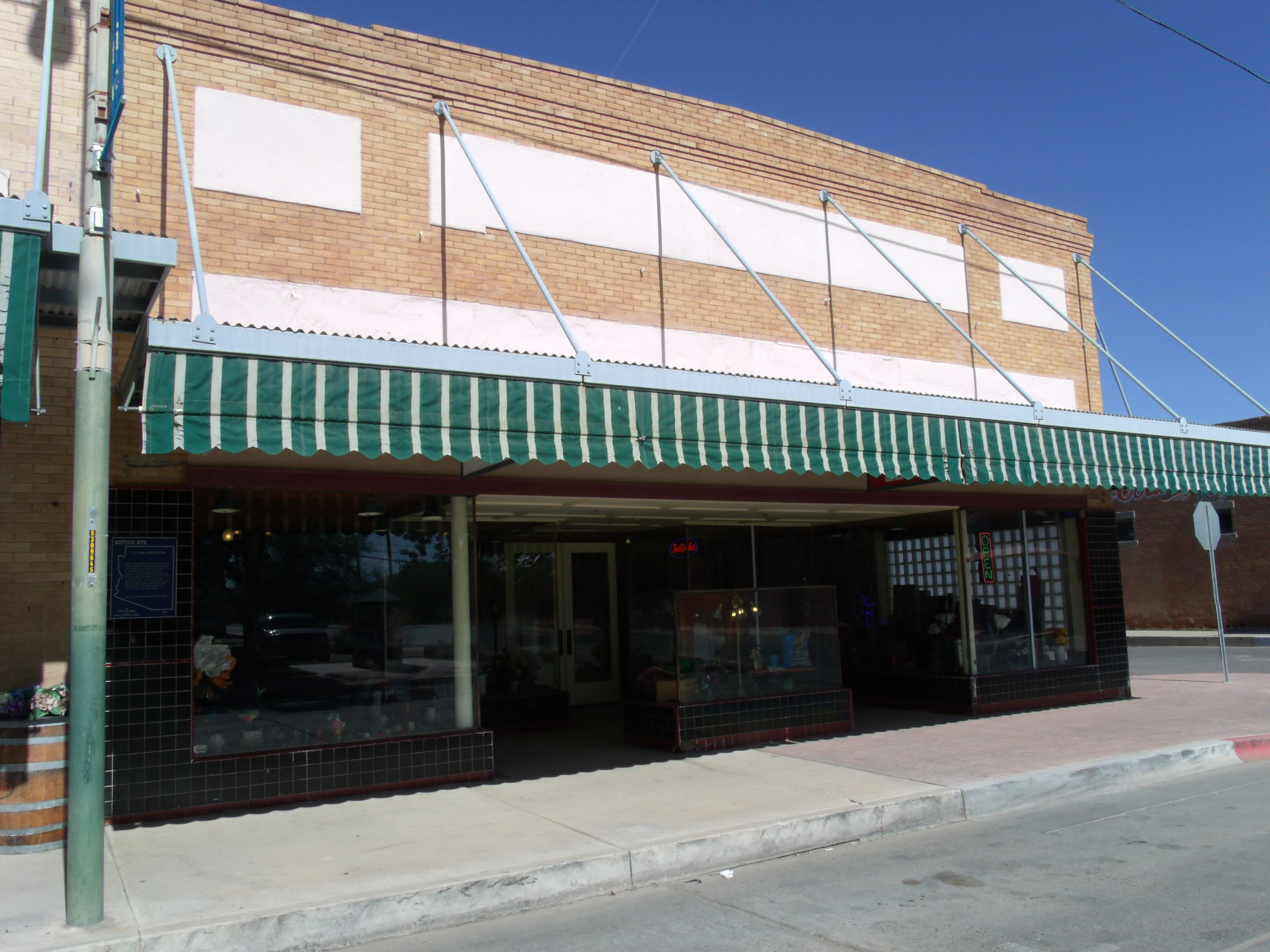
The Popular Store/ Mandells Dept. Store Building.

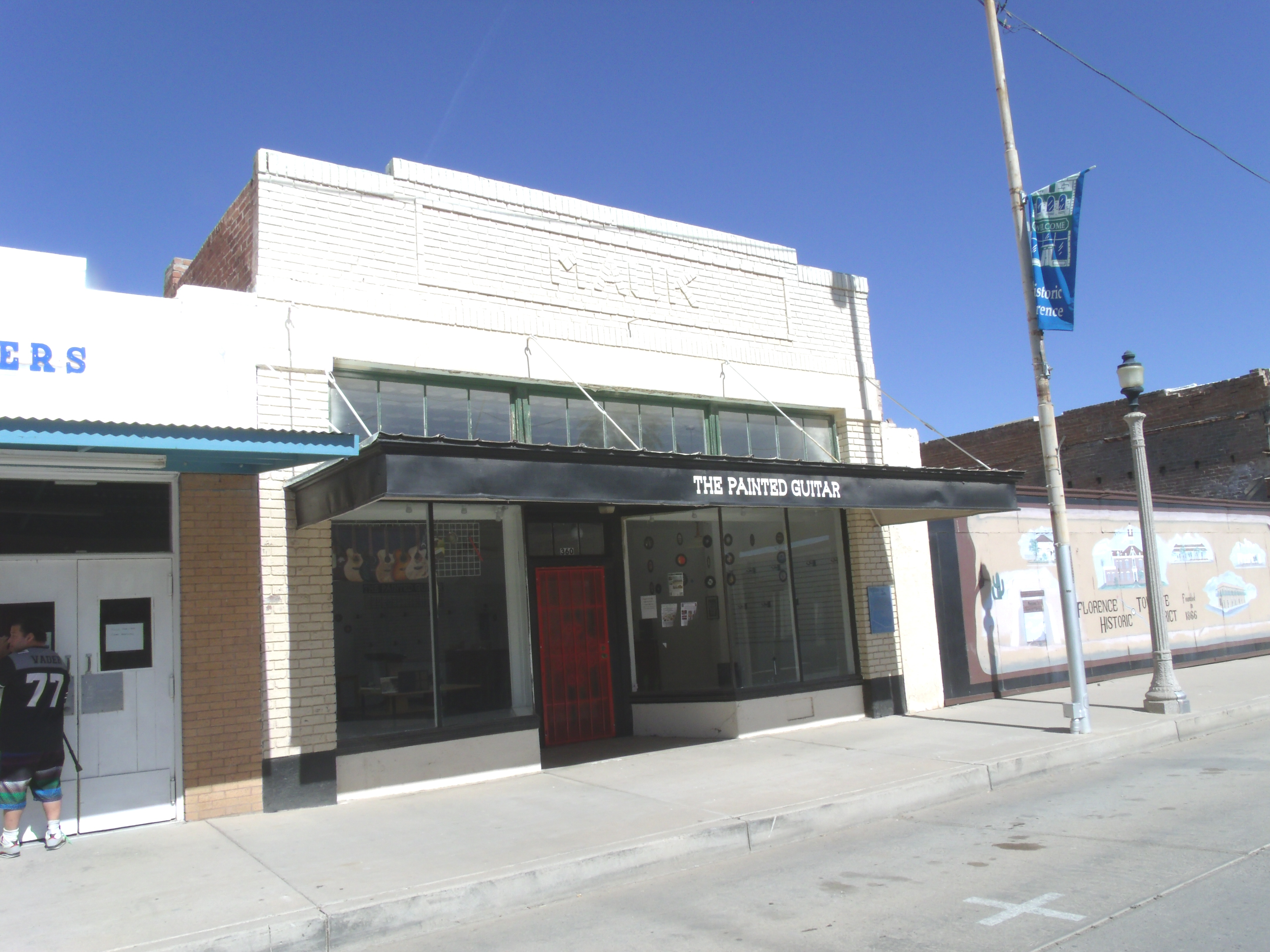
The Mauk Building.

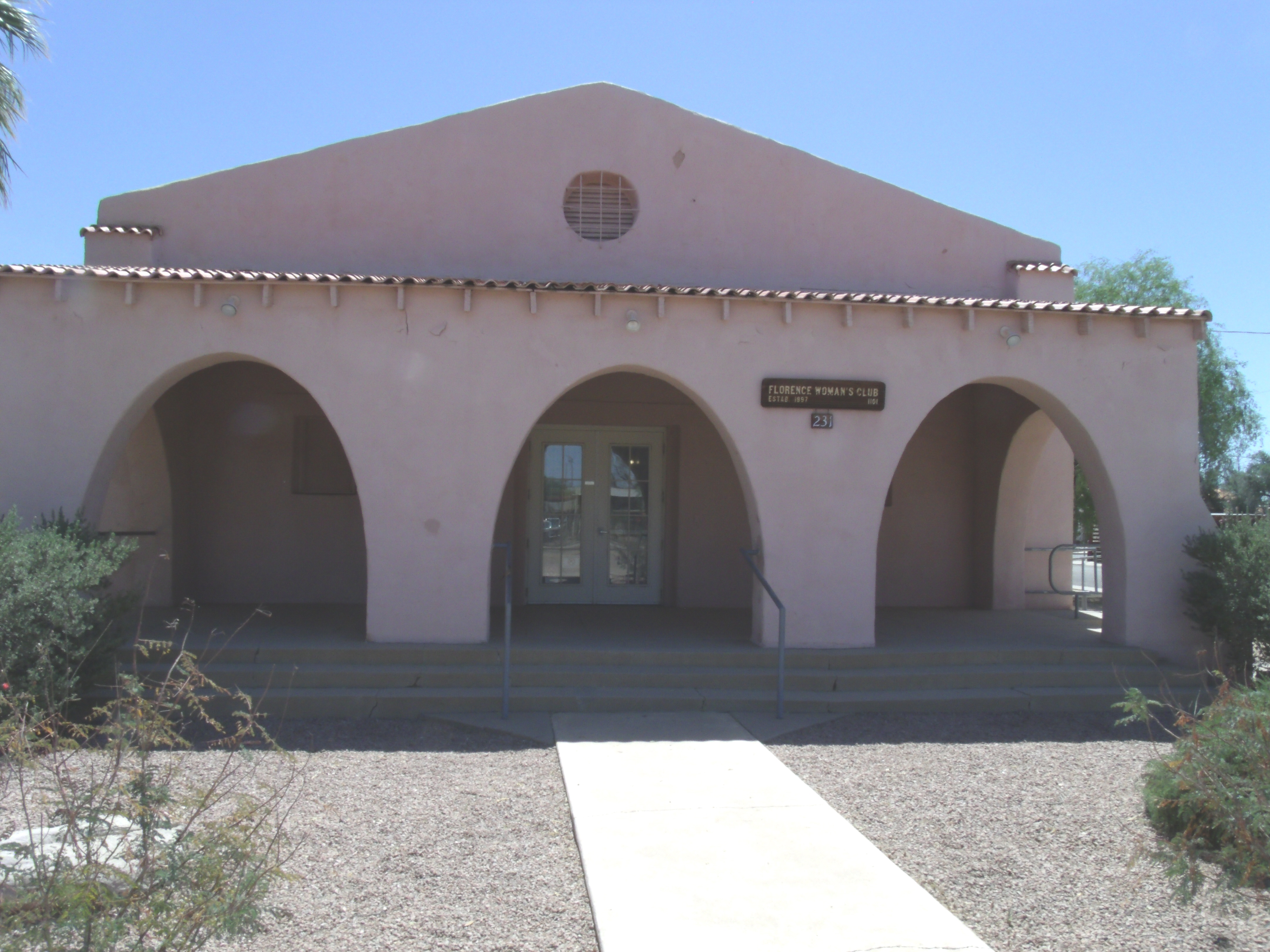
The Florence Women's Club Building.

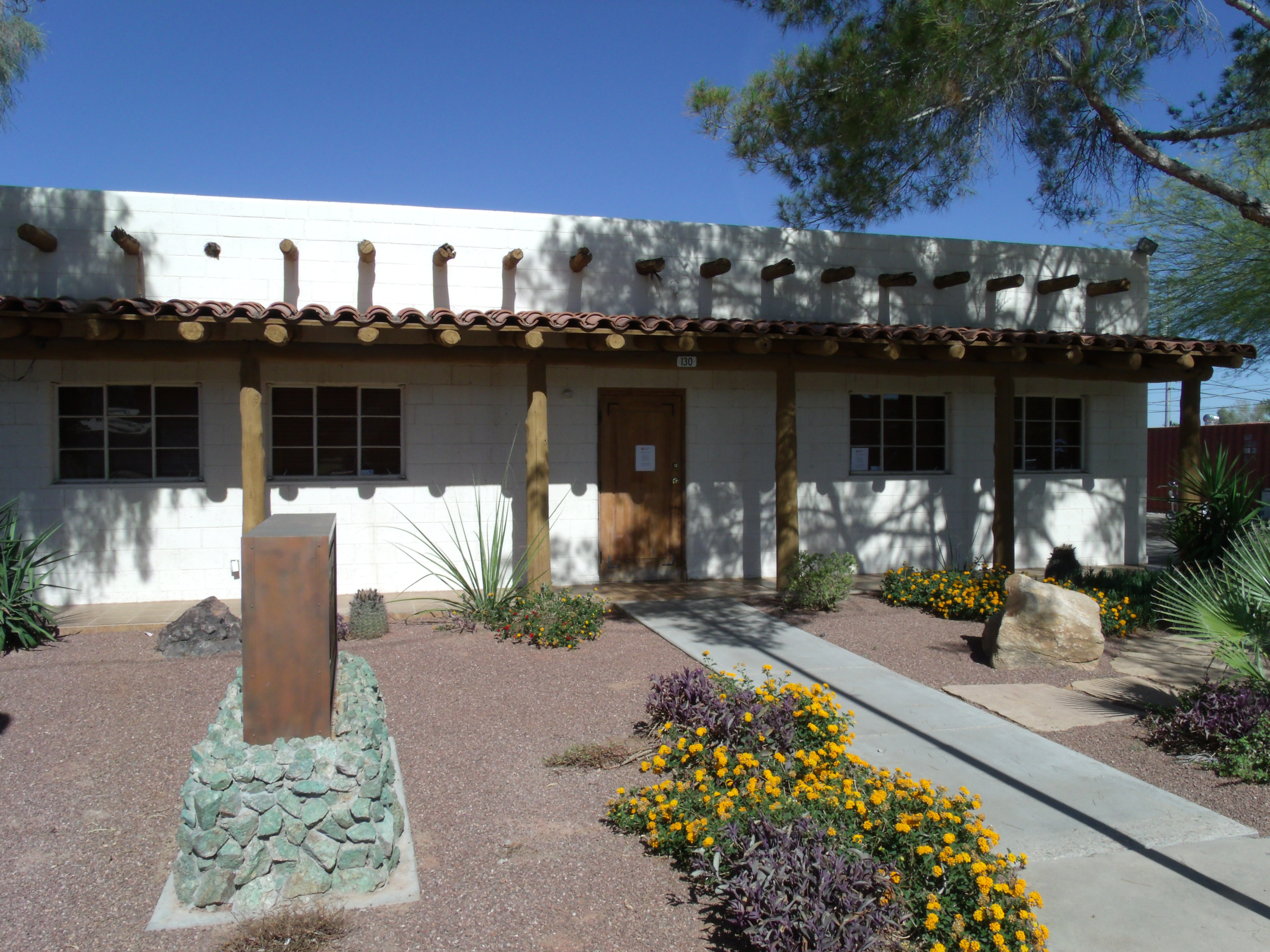
The Florence Town Hall Building.

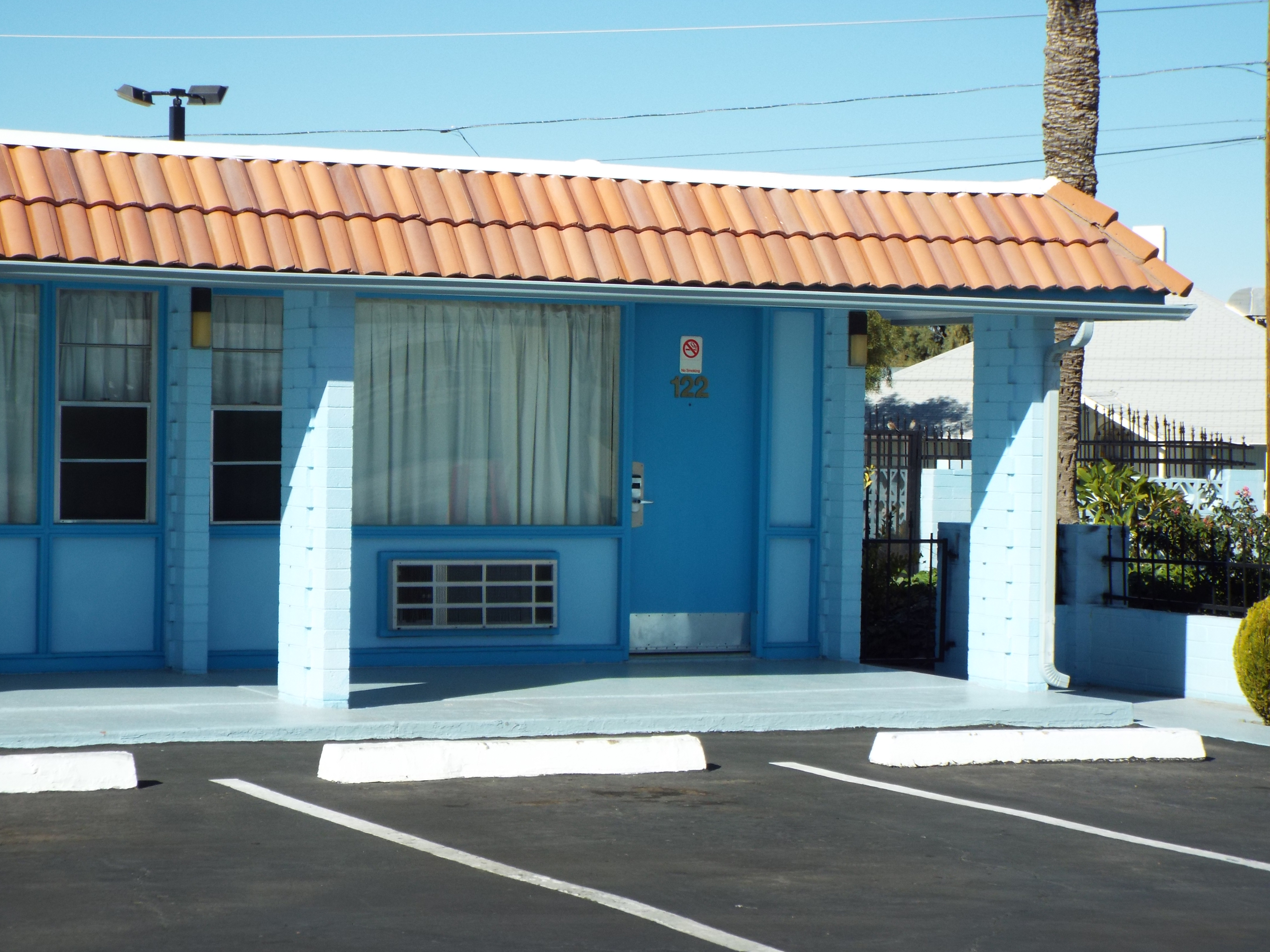
Room 122 in the Blue Mist Motel

=== Houses of religious worship ===
The following houses of religious worship are listed as historic by the Florence Historic District Advisory Commission.

- The Chapel of the Gila – built in 1870 and located in 306 E. 8th St. Listed as Historic by the Historic District Advisory Commission.
- The Second Catholic Church – built in 1912 and located in 221 E. 8th St. Listed as Historic by the Historic District Advisory Commission.
- The First Presbyterian Church of Florence – built in 1931 and located in 225 Butte Ave. Listed as Historic by the Historic District Advisory Commission.
Historic Houses of religious worship
(National Register of Historic Places)
(Florence Historic District Advisory Commission.)
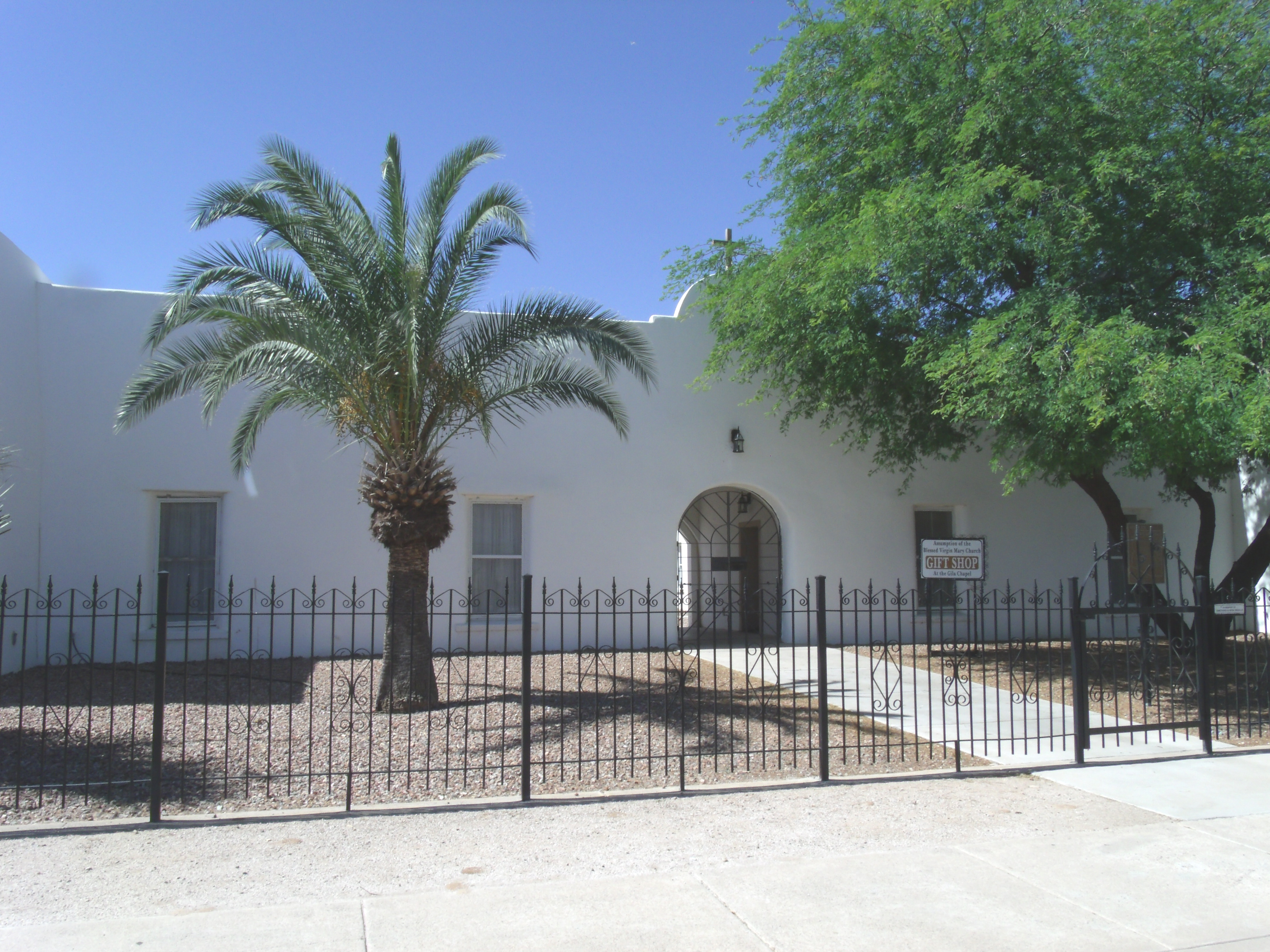
The Chapel of the Gila .

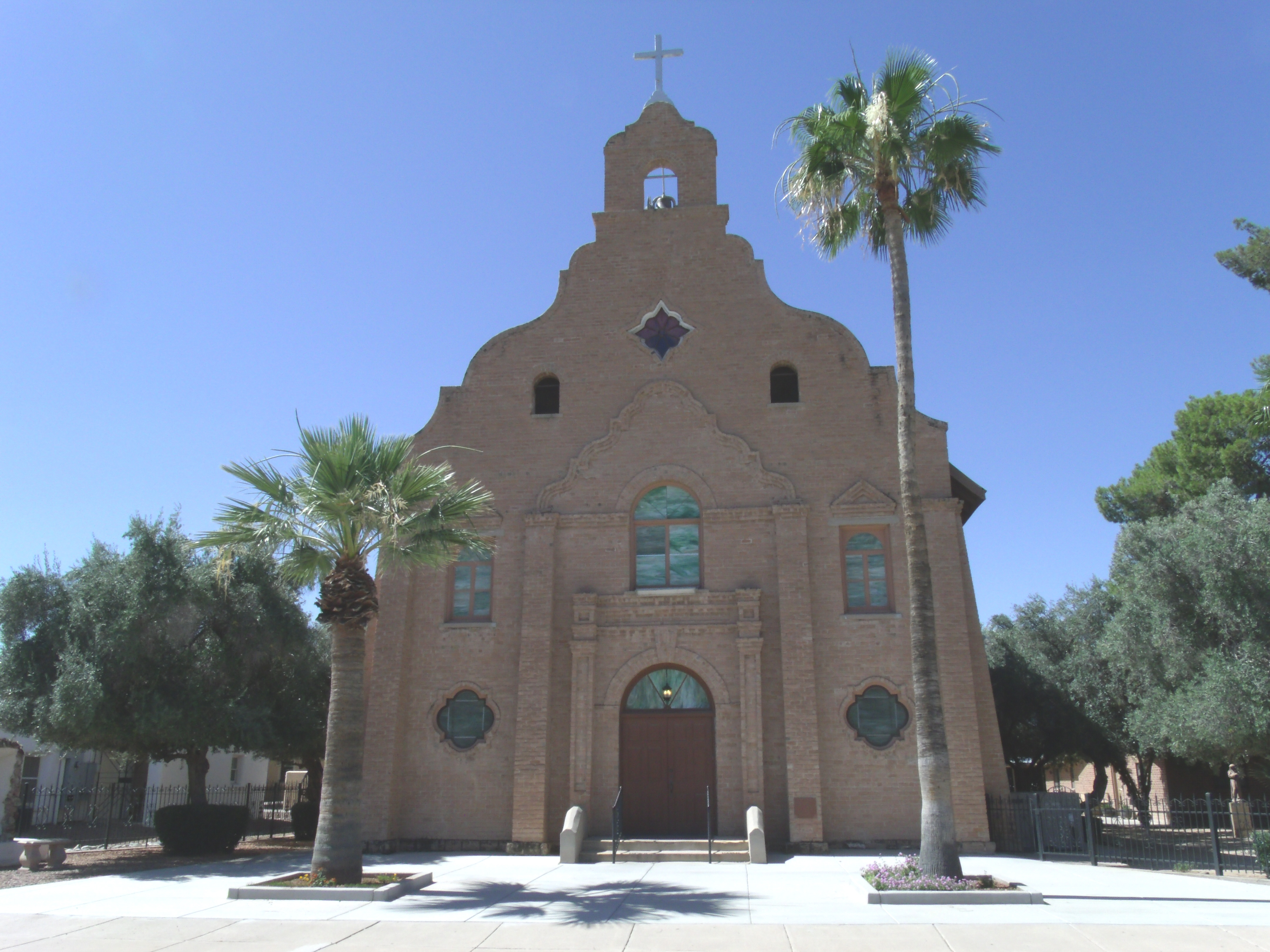
The Second Catholic Church.

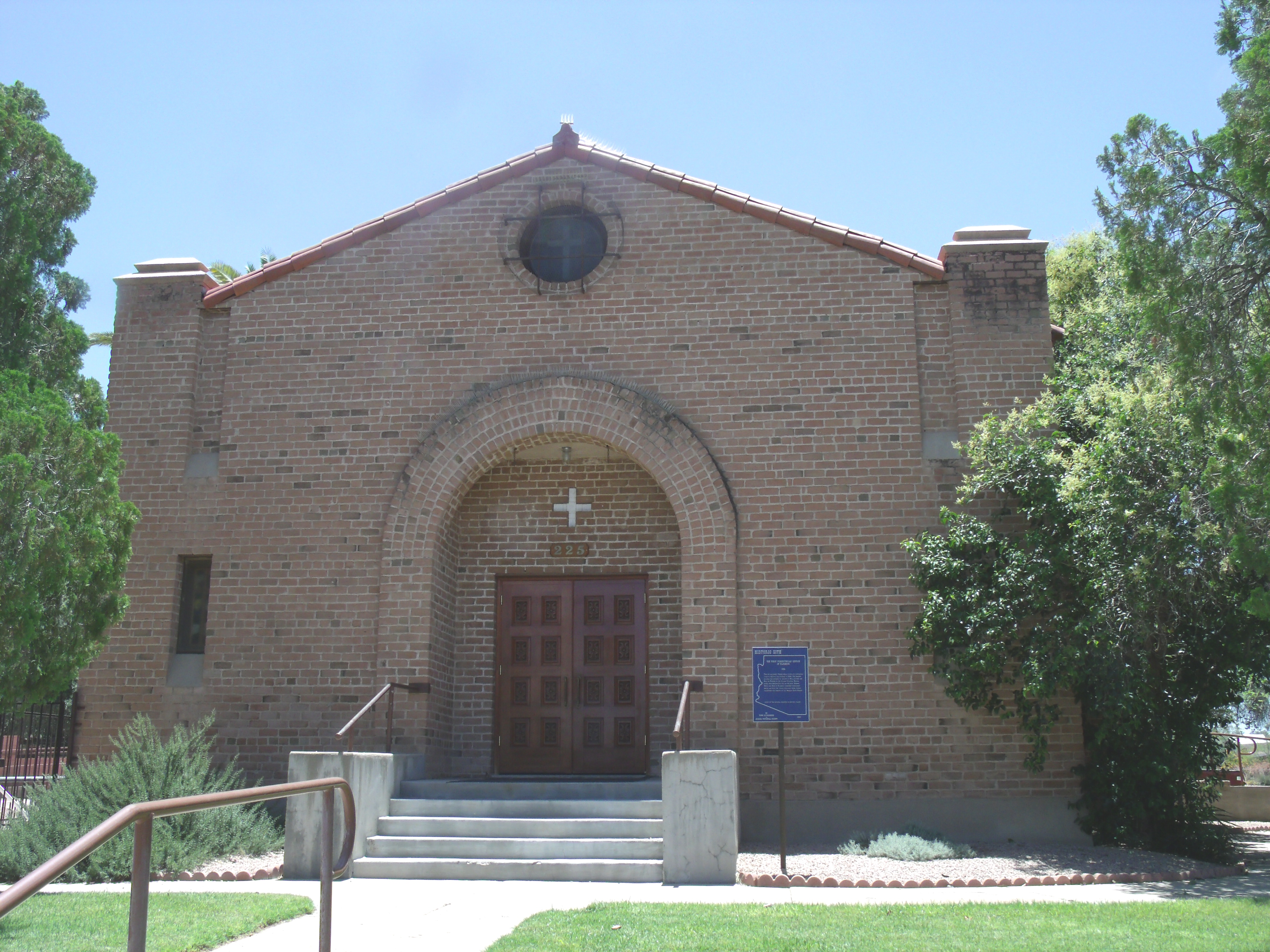
The First Presbyterian Church of Florence.

=== Houses ===
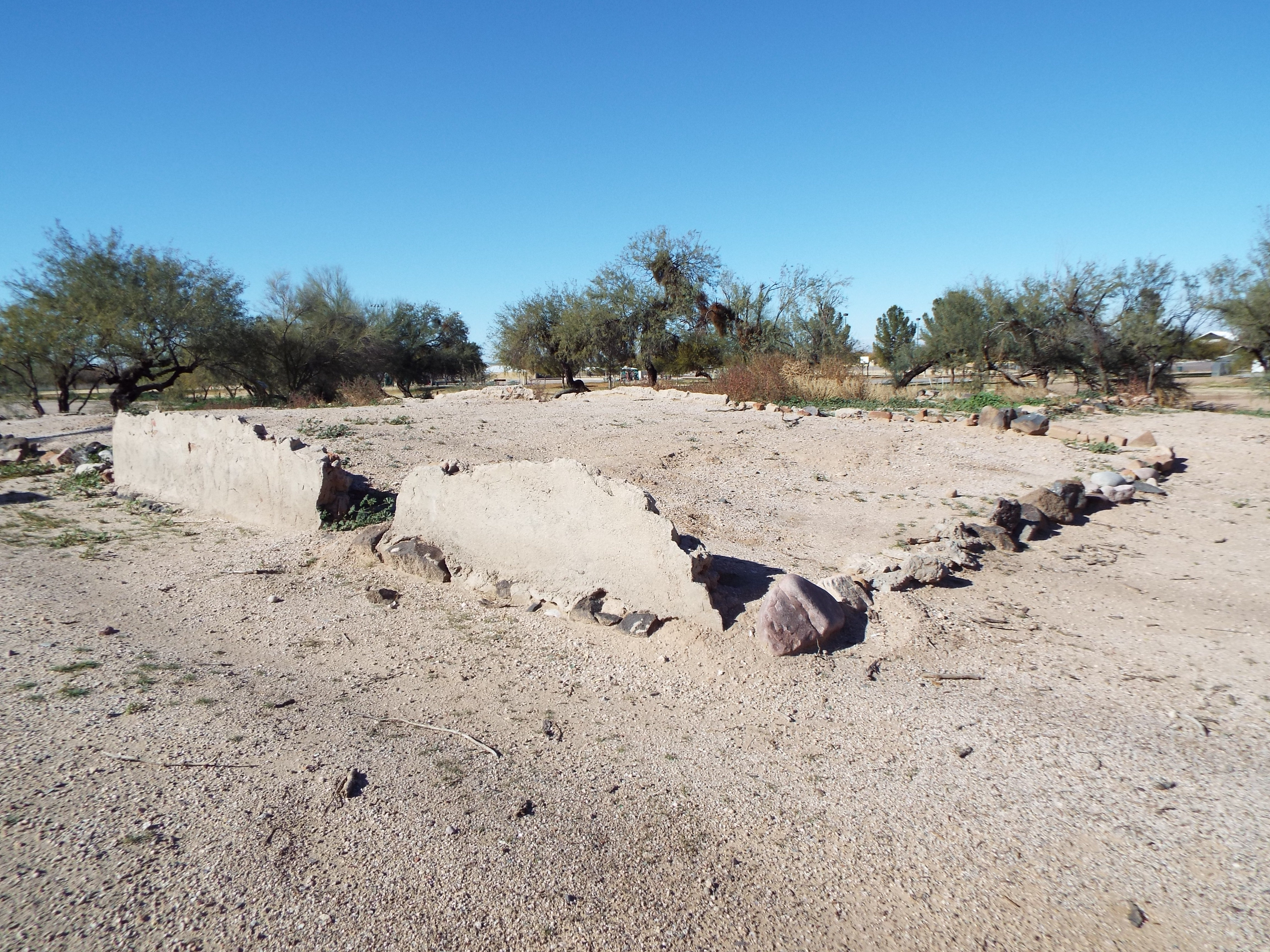
Ruins of Levi Ruggles House

The following is brief description of the houses in Florence which are listed as historical by the National Register of Historic Places and/or the Florence Historic District Advisory Commission. Included are the images of these properties. Among the notable residents of Florence whose houses are considered are Pauline Cushman an American actress and a spy for the Union Army during the American Civil War, Richard E. Sloan, Arizona's last Territorial Governor and Thomas Fulbright, lawyer who wrote a book titled "Cow Country Counselor". He was involved in the cases of Winnie Ruth Judd and Eva Dugan.

- The Ruins of Levi Ruggles House – The house was built in 1866 and the ruins are located in Ruggles St. between Quartz and Willow Streets. American Civil War veteran Levi Ruggles, the founder of Florence, came to Arizona Territory in 1866 as a U.S. Indian Agent. Recognizing the agricultural potential of the valley, he found an easily fordable crossing on the Gila River and surveyed a townsite here. In 1869, he built his first family home. With the aid of Governor R.C. McCormick, he secured a post office in August of the same year. Ruggles held numerous public offices including that of Territorial Legislator. Listed as Historic by the Historic District Advisory Commission.
- The Granville Wheat Outback House – built in 1871 located at 125 Ruggles St. (next to the George Brown house). Listed as Historic by the Historic District Advisory Commission.
- The Elena Llescas House – built in 1872 and located at 175 Bailey St. Listed as Historic by the Historic District Advisory Commission.
- The James S. Melquides E. Douglas House – built in 1874 and located at 850 S. Park St. It was listed in the National Register of Historic Places in 204; reference #04000486.
- The Jesus Martinez House – built in 1875 and located at 321 Bailey St. In 1886, Pinal County converted part of the building into the first County Hospital. It had six beds. Each had a horsehair mattress and a wool blanket. By 1890, the house was used as a meat market, store and residences. Listed as Historic by the Historic District Advisory Commission.
- The Ross/ Fryer-Cushman House – built in 1876 and located at 364 N. Grant St. Roderick Ross, one of Florence's first blacksmiths, W.C. Smith was the second owner. Pauline Cushman (born Harriet Wood), an American actress and a spy for the Union Army during the American Civil War and her husband Jere Fryer, later purchased the house. Tom Mix was a tenant there in the 1930s. Listed as Historic by the Historic District Advisory Commission.

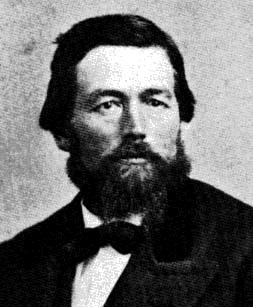
Capt. Grandville Henderson Oury

- The Walker-Oury House – built in 1877 and located at 255 Ruggles St. John D. Walker was an agent and physician to the Pima Indians at Sacaton. This building was used as courtroom and county offices during his terms as justice of the peace, county surveyor and probate judge. Walker was an early investor in the Vekol Mine and wrote the first Pima grammar text. Here Pauline Cushman wed Jere Freyer. The building was purchased (1886) by Granville Henderson Oury, delegate to the Confederate Congress, Arizona territorial legislator and attorney general, district court judge, and delegate to the U.S. Congress. Listed as Historic by the Historic District Advisory Commission.
- The John Clum House – built in 1878 and located at 180 N. Granite St. The home was built by John Clum, an Indian agent, editor and publisher of Florence's first newspaper, the Arizona Citizen. He also was the founder and editor of the Tombstone Epitaph and was Tombstone's first mayor. This building appears to have housed the Citizen's office and press. A later owner, William Guild, built the telegraph line from the Silver King Mine to Casa Grande. Listed as Historic by the Historic District Advisory Commission.
- The Isabelle Cosgrove House – built in 1878 and located at 191 Bailey St. Frank Cosgrove was born in Ireland. He immigrated to the US and became a blacksmith. He lived in this house with his wife Isabelle. Listed as Historic by the Historic District Advisory Commission.

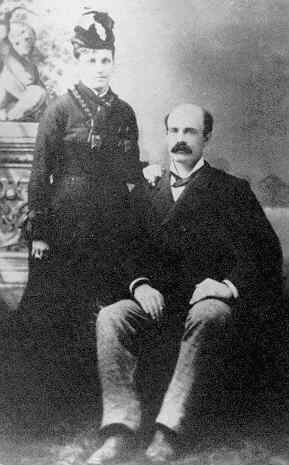
John Clum with his first wife, Mary "Mollie" Clum.

- The James S. Melquides E. Douglas House – built in 1874 and located at 850 S. Park St. It was listed in the National Register of Historic Places in 204; reference #04000486.
- The George Brown House – built in 1878 and located at 125 Ruggles St. The home was occupied by George A. Brown, Florence's first Wells Fargo agent (1877–1903). Listed as Historic by the Historic District Advisory Commission.
- The Jesus Preciado de Luna/ Bernardina Lorona House – built in 1880 and located at 115 E. 11th St. Listed as Historic by the Historic District Advisory Commission.
- The Fields House – built in the 1880s and located at 423 9th St. It was listed in the National Register of Historic Places in 1986; reference #86003858.
- The John Nicolas Residence – built in 1880 and located adjacent to the "John Nicola New Beer Saloon" at 180 Bailey St. It is listed as Historic by the Historic District Advisory Commission.
- The Sam Kee House – built in 1880 and located at 171 Pinal St. Sam Kee was a Chinese immigrant who settled in Florence. Listed as Historic by the Historic District Advisory Commission.
- The Harvey-Niemeyer House – built in 1880 and located at 250 (once 1613) S. Main St. Physician William Harvey was known as an "Angle of Mercy" during a smallpox epidemic and was on scene at the aftermath of the 1888 Pete Gabriel-Joe Phy shootout. Later resident Charles Niemeyer was Clerk of the Pinal County Board of Supervisors for 25 years and also served as local postmaster. Listed in the National Register of Historic Places on August 1, 1986, reference #86002627.
- The Emma Monk Guild House – built in 1880 and located at 171 Willow St. Emma Monk Guild taught school in Florence on and off from 1885 to 1897 and was the first Florence principal. She also taught in Red Rock, Casa Grande and was an instructor at the University of Arizona Preparatory in Tucson and a principal at Clifton. She is considered one of Arizona's mothers of education. Listed as Historic by the Historic District Advisory Commission.
- The Elmer Coker House – built in 1881 and located at 100 S. Main St. Elmer Coker was a delegate to the Arizona Constitutional Convention and is considered "Father of the Arizona Corporation Commission. Listed as Historic by the Historic District Advisory Commission.
- The William Clark House – built in 1884 and located at 190 Main St. This house was built for Silver King mining engineer William Clarke and his wife Ella. The house later served as the residence of Richard E. Sloan , Arizona's last Territorial Governor. Listed as Historic by the Historic District Advisory Commission.
- The Andronico Lorona House – built in 1886 and located at 704 Silver St. Listed in the National Register of Historic Places on August 1, 1986, reference #86002631.
- The Carmen Mecha House – built in 1887 and located at 240 Ruggles St. Listed as Historic by the Historic District Advisory Commission.
- The Truman Randall House – built in 1887 and located at 550 (once was 2010) S. Main St. W.C. Truman was the sheriff who in 1889 captured Pearl Heart, the first woman to rob a stagecoach. Listed in the National Register of Historic Places on July 13, 1987, reference #87001594.
- The Jacob Suter House – built in 1888 and located at 270 Pinal St. Jacob Suter was a Swiss born tinsmith. Listed as Historic by the Historic District Advisory Commission.
- The John Keating House – built in 1888 and located at 234 Willow St. John Keating was a pioneer stage driver. He served in the Territorial legislature, Florence town councilman and mayor of Florence. He was owner of the "Tunnel Saloon", site of the 1888 Pete Gabriel-Joe Phy shootout. Listed as Historic by the Historic District Advisory Commission.
- The Albert T. Colton/ H. H. Freeman House – built in 1889 and located in the Southwest corner of Butte and Willow Streets. Listed in the National Register of Historic Places on August 1, 1986, reference #86002615.
- The C.D. Henry House – built in 1889 and located at 144 (once 1520) S. Willow St. The Henry house is considered one of the earliest fired brick residences remaining In Florence. Listed in the National Register of National Places on August 1, 1986, reference #86002628.
- The W.Y. Price House – built in 1900 and located at 1612 Willow St. Listed in the National register of historic Places in 1986; reference #86002632.
- The Ines and Davis Littlefield Bea House – built in 1900 and located at 1913 S. Elizabeth St. It was listed in the National Register of Historic Places in 1986; reference #86002630.
- The George Brockway House a.k.a. the Araiza House (formerly 2017 Central St.) – built in 1900 and located at 501 S. Central Ave. George Brockway was the first mayor of Florence. Listed in the National Register of Historic Places on May 26, 2004, reference #04000485
- The Carminatte-Parham House – built in 1910 and located at 350 E. 6th St. Listed in the National Register of Historic Places on August 1, 1986, reference #86002624.
- The Ignacio Manjares House – built in 1910 and located at 351 Silver St. Ignacio Manjares was a charter member of the Pinal County Cattle Growers Association. Listed in the National Register of Historic Places on August 6, 1987, reference #87001591.
- The Adrian Pierson House – built in 1912 and located at E. 6th St. and U.S. Route 79. It was listed in the National Register of Historic Places in 1987; reference#87001593.
- The Joseph Spinas Rental House – built in 1913 and located at 221 Bailey St. Joseph Spinas, a prominent cattle rancher, was born in Switzerland. With his two brothers, he built one of the first irrigation ditches in the Florence area on the north side of the Gila River. Listed as Historic by the Historic District Advisory Commission.
- The George Huffman House – built in 1919 and located at 425 Butte Ave. Listed in the National Register of Historic Places on August 1, 1986, reference #86002629.
- The Thomas Fulbright House – built in 1925 and located at 75 Matilda St. Thomas (Tom) Fulbright wrote a book titled "Cow Country Counselor". He was involved in the cases of Winnie Ruth Judd and Eva Dugan. Listed in the National Register of Historic Places on October 4, 1996, reference #96001955.
- The John Zellinger House – built in 1929 and located at 191 Willow St. Listed as Historic by the Historic District Advisory Commission.
- 9th, Willow and Central Street – According to the late A. W. Gressinger, president of the Pinal County Historical Society, Levi Ruggles was buried in the premises of his second house which was located at 9th St., between Willow Street and Central Ave. in 1889. The house itself was on the southwest corner of the lot, with much if the rest of the land occupied by fruit trees. By the time Ruggles died in his home in 1889, he had lost his wife, the former Cynthia Tharp, and three of their children years earlier. Their tombstones vanished and a developer built an apartment complex over their graves.
Historic Houses in Florence, Arizona
(National Register of Historic Places)
(Florence Historic District Advisory Commission.)
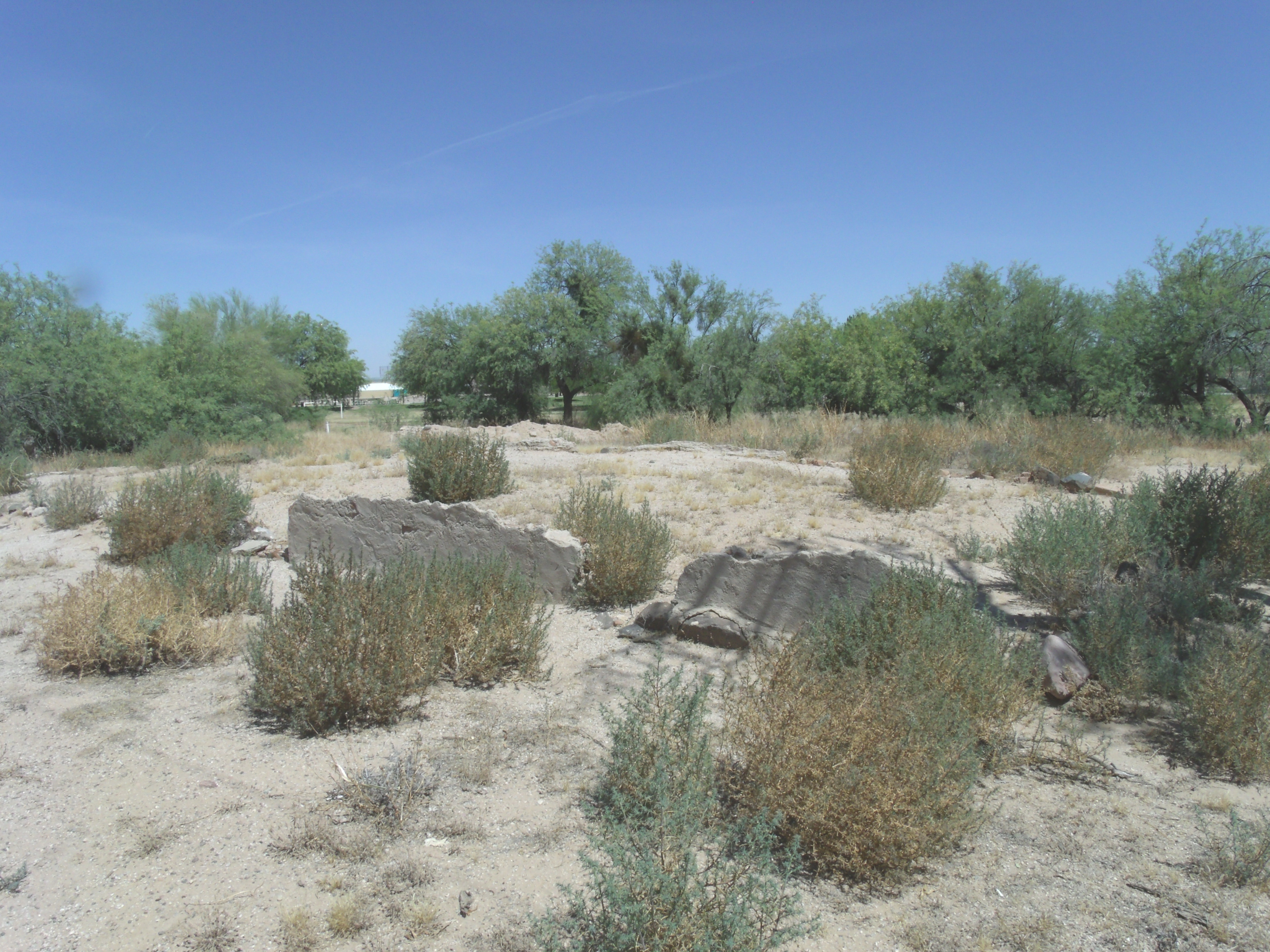
The Ruins of Levi Ruggles House.

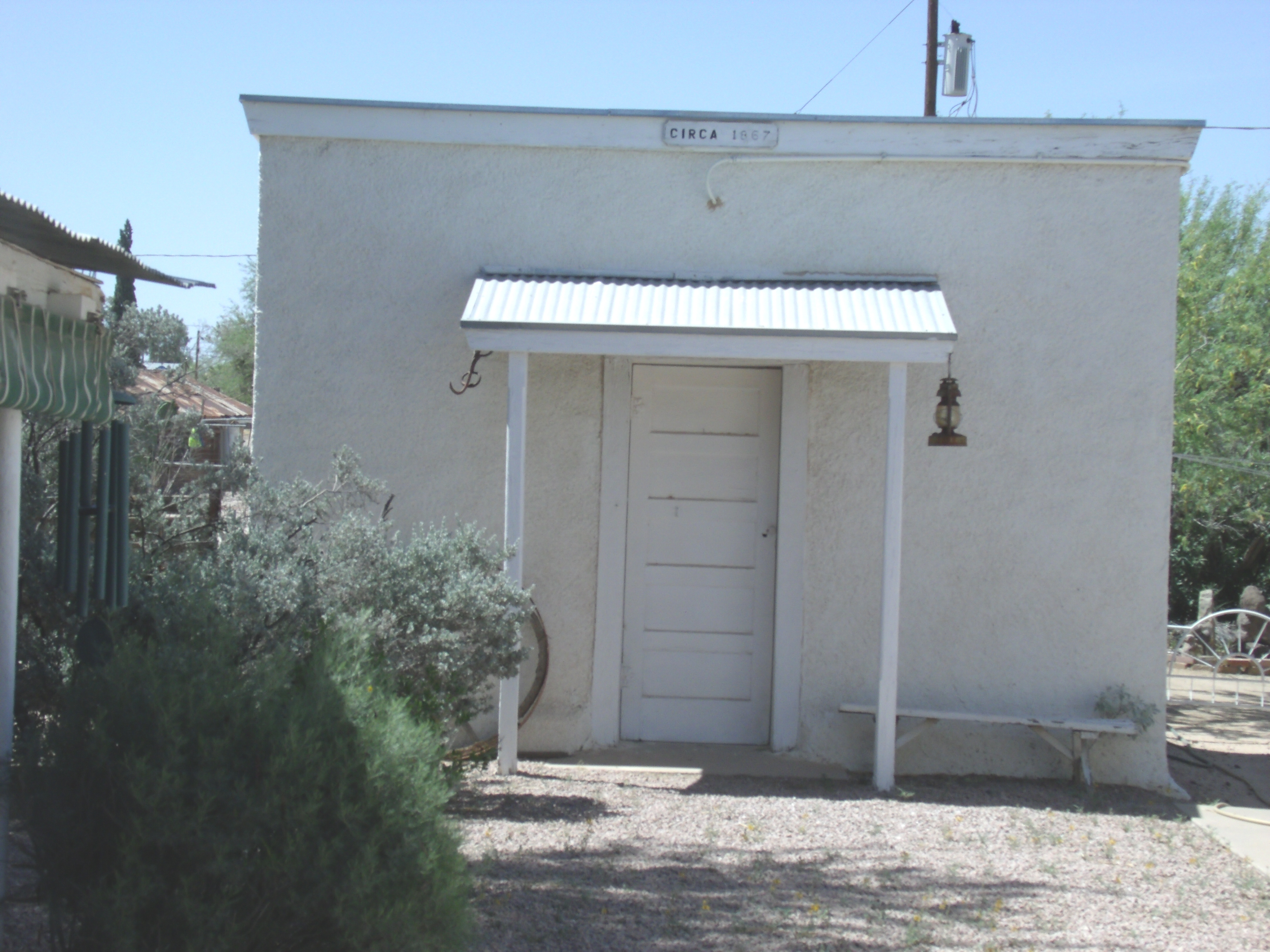
The Granville Wheat Outback House.

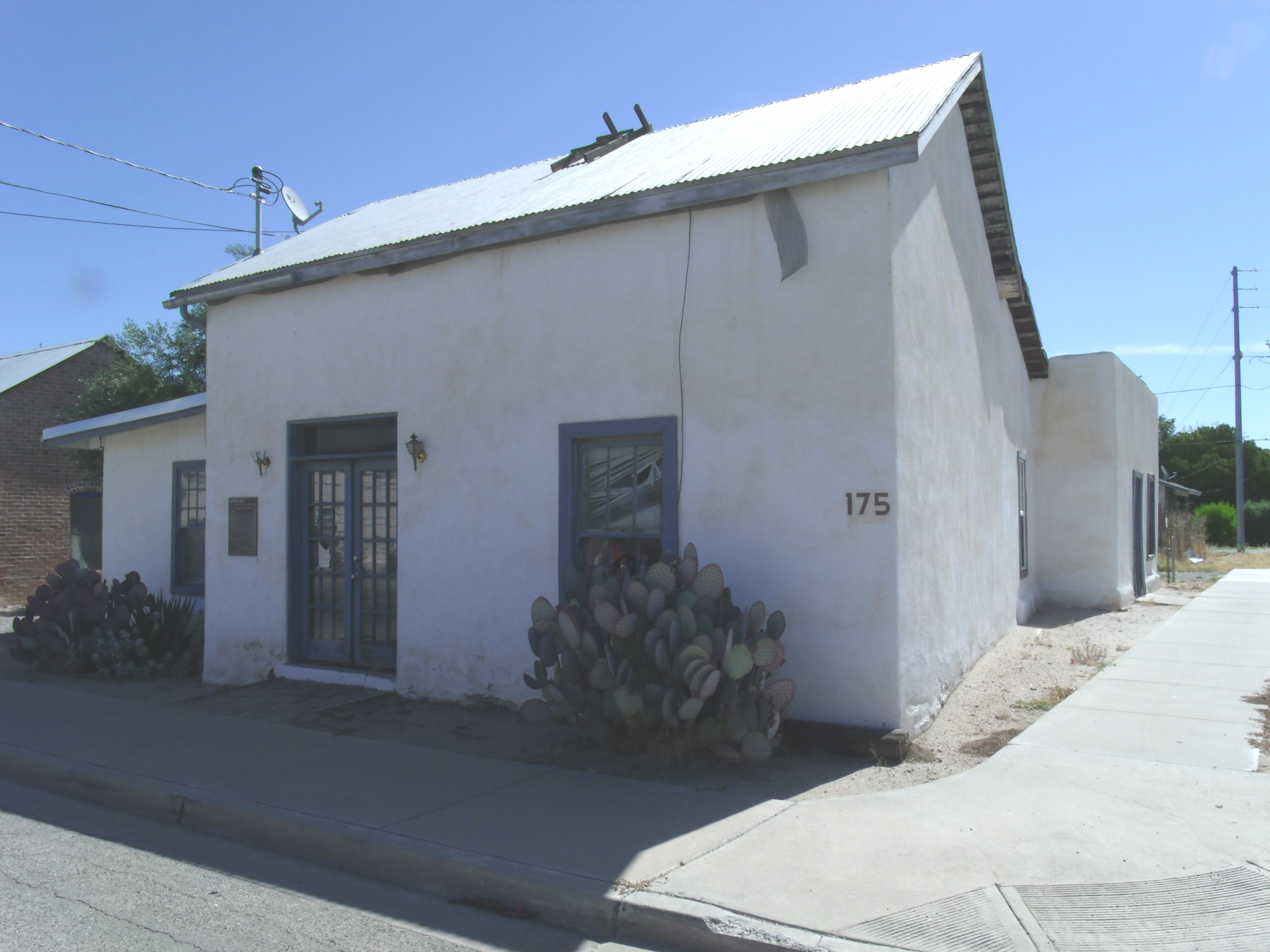
The Elena Llescas House.

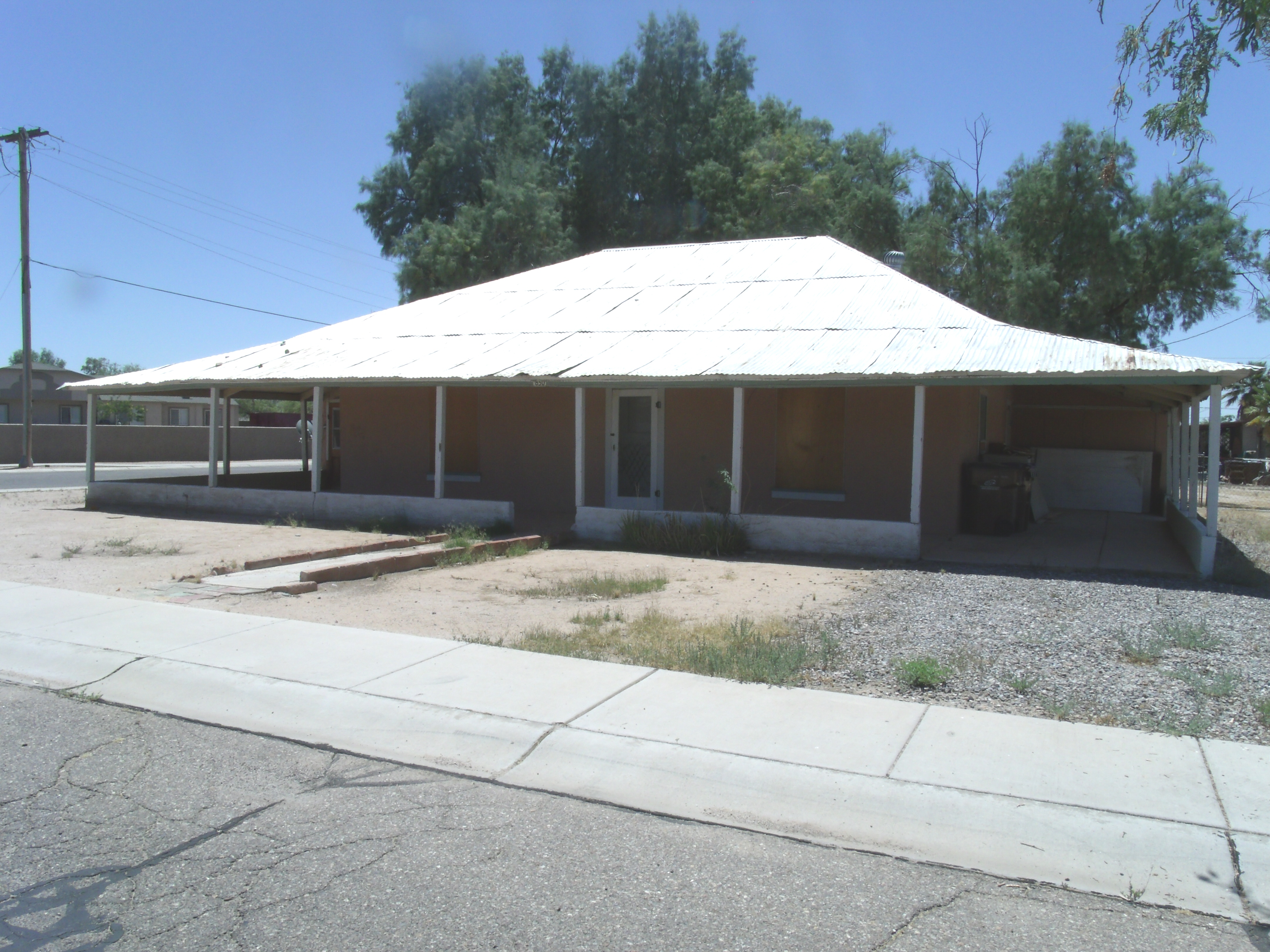
The James S. Melquides E. Douglas House.

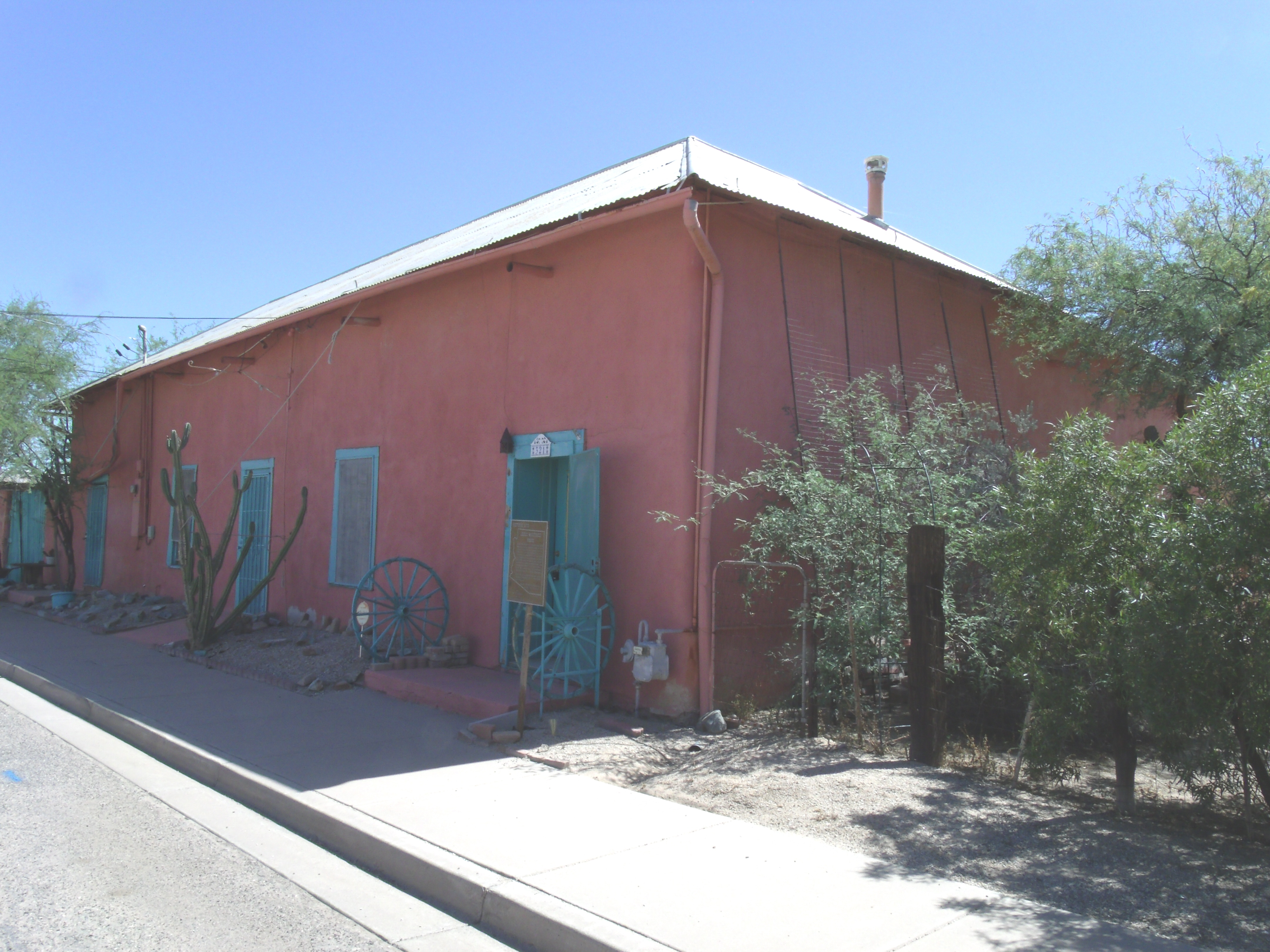
The Jesus Martinez House.

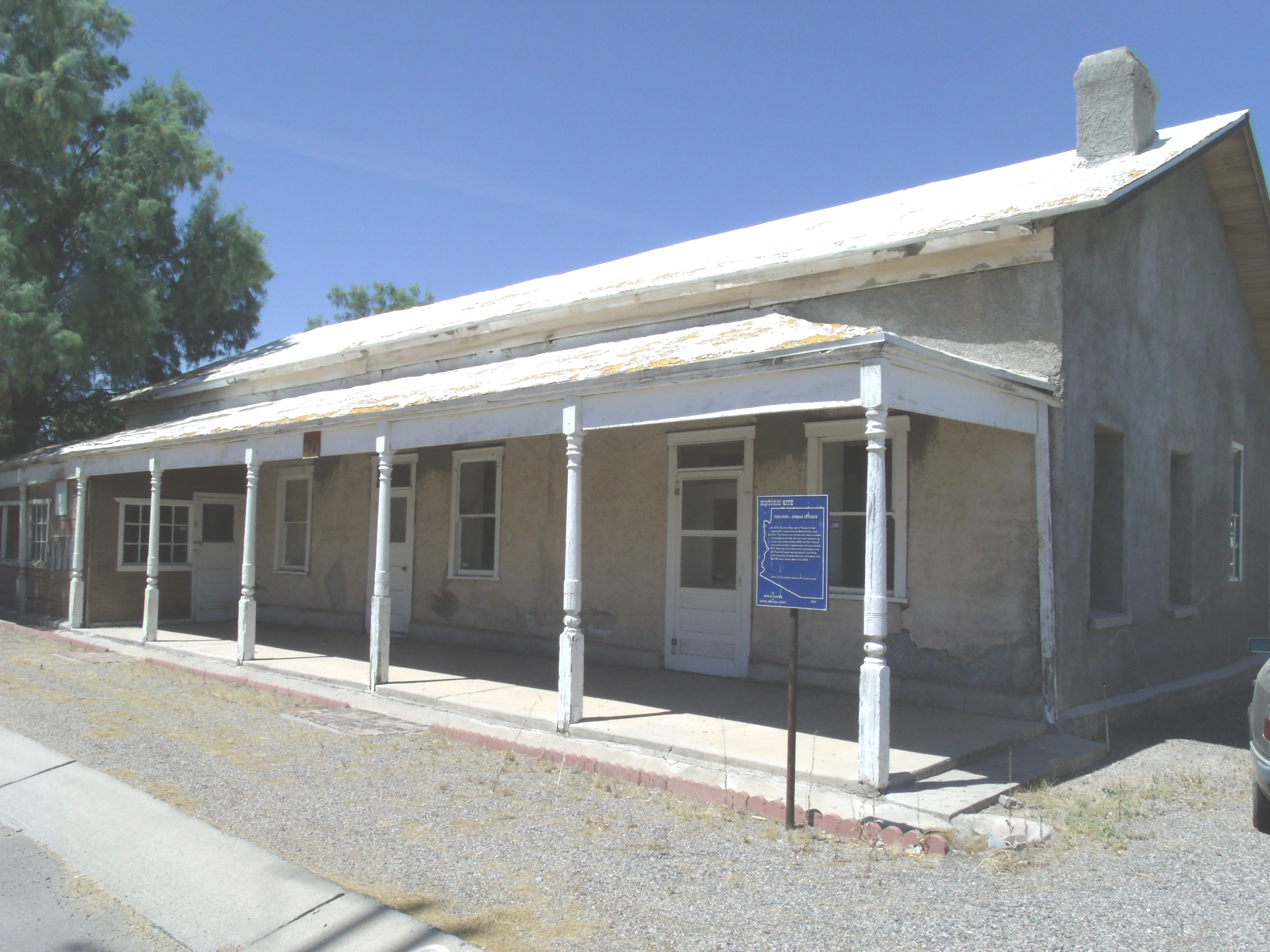
The Ross/ Fryer-Cushman House.

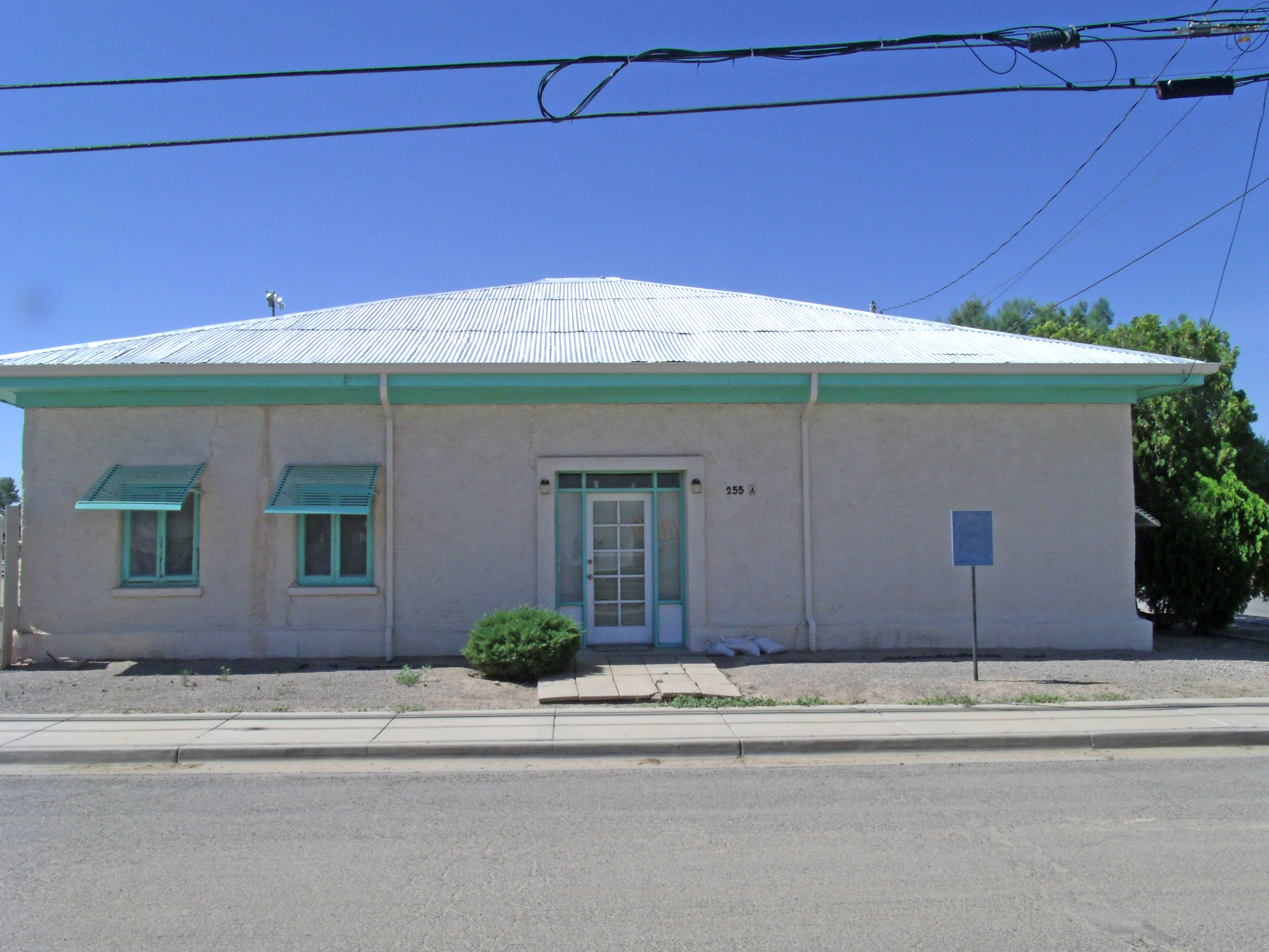
The Walker-Oury House.

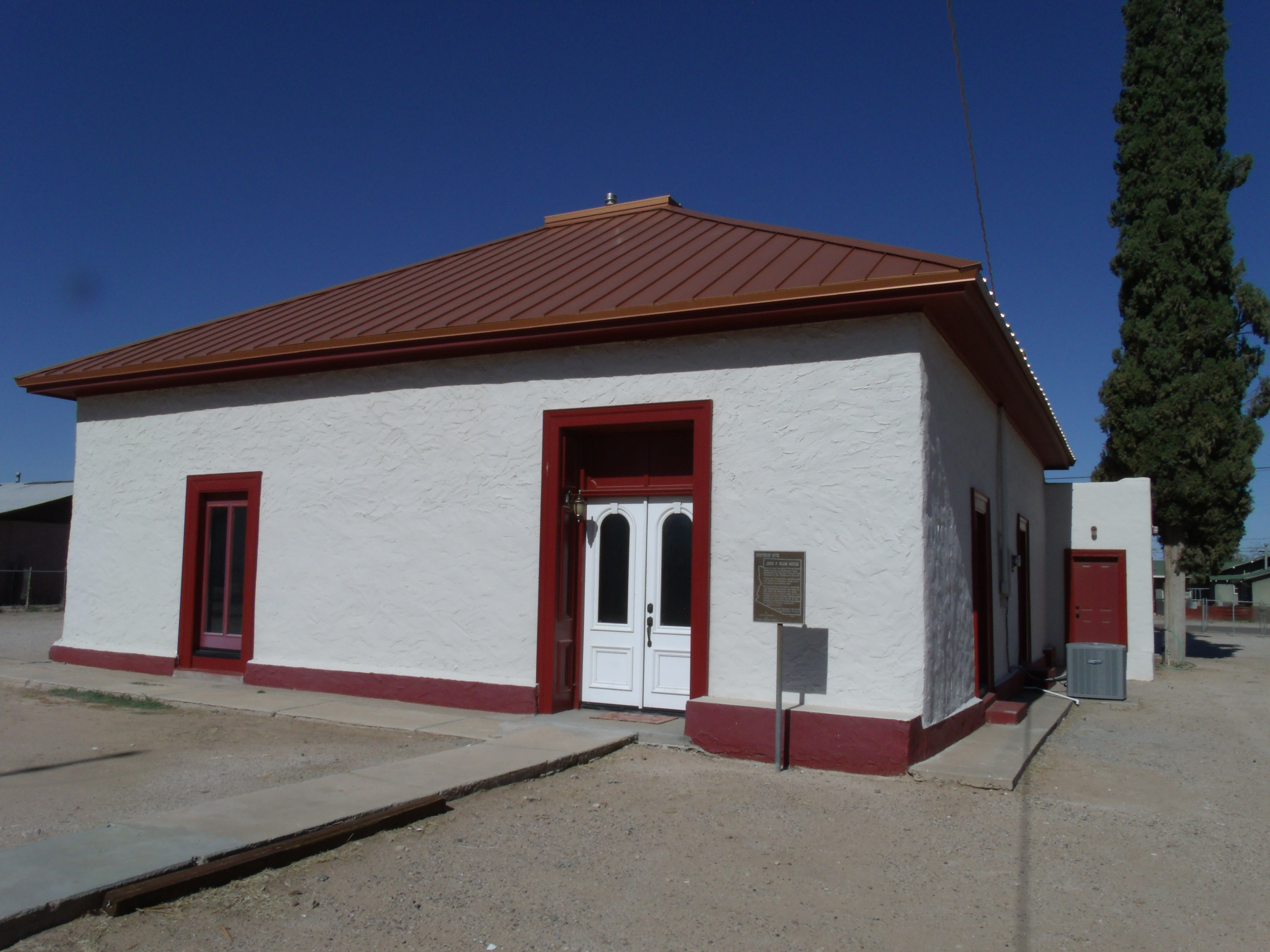
The John Clum House.

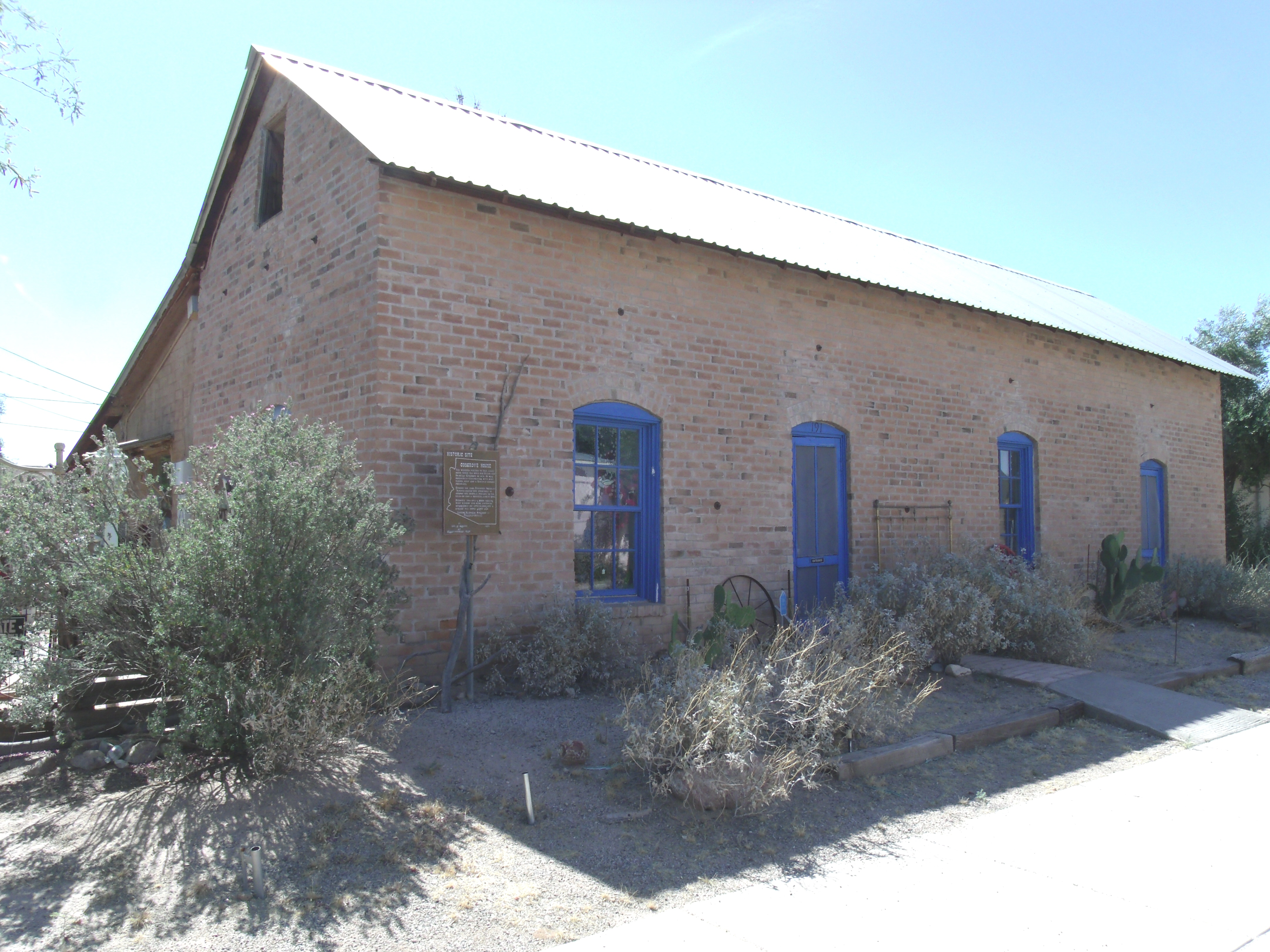
The Isabelle Cosgrove House.

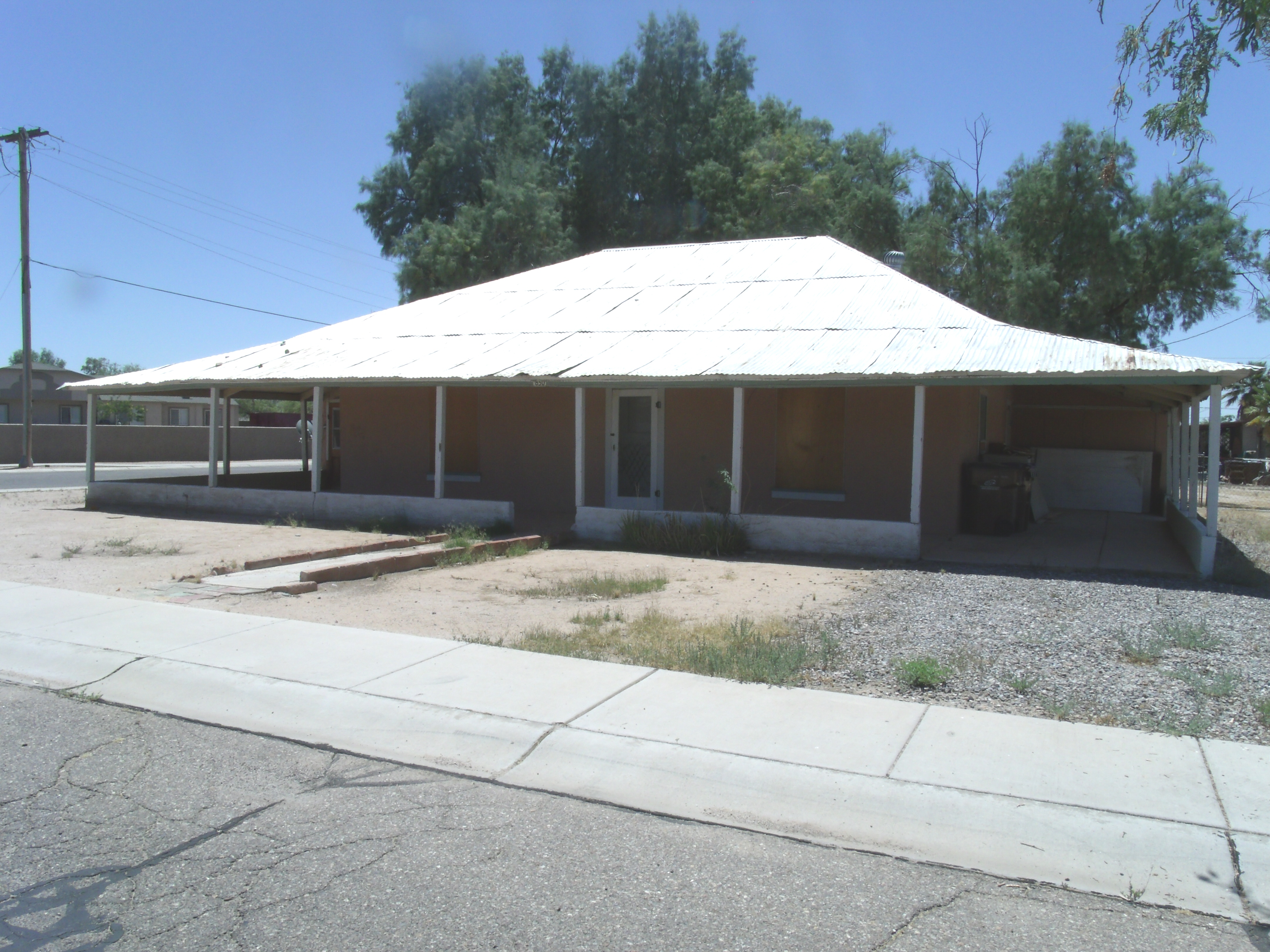
The James S. Melquides E. Douglas House.

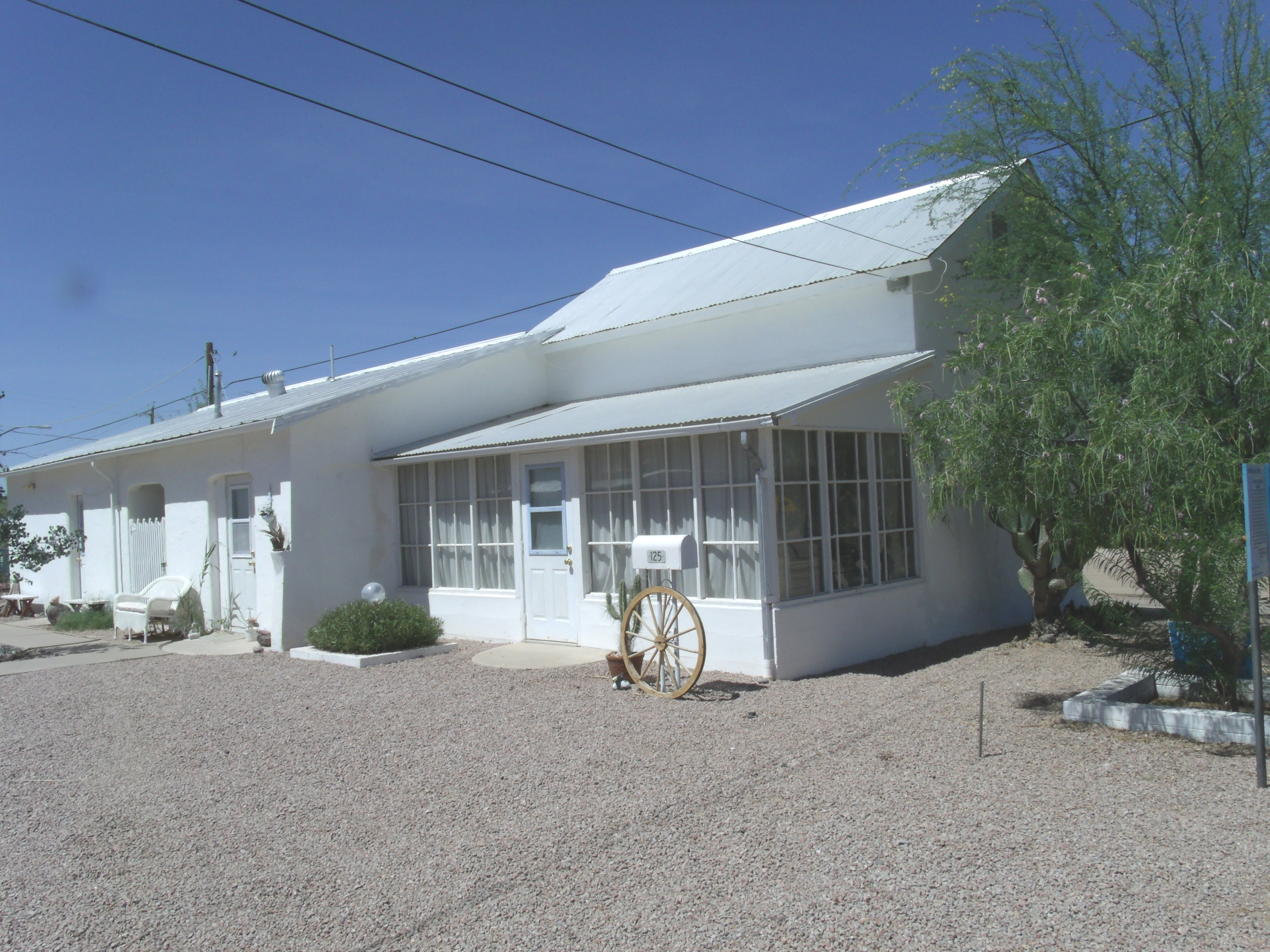
The George Brown House.

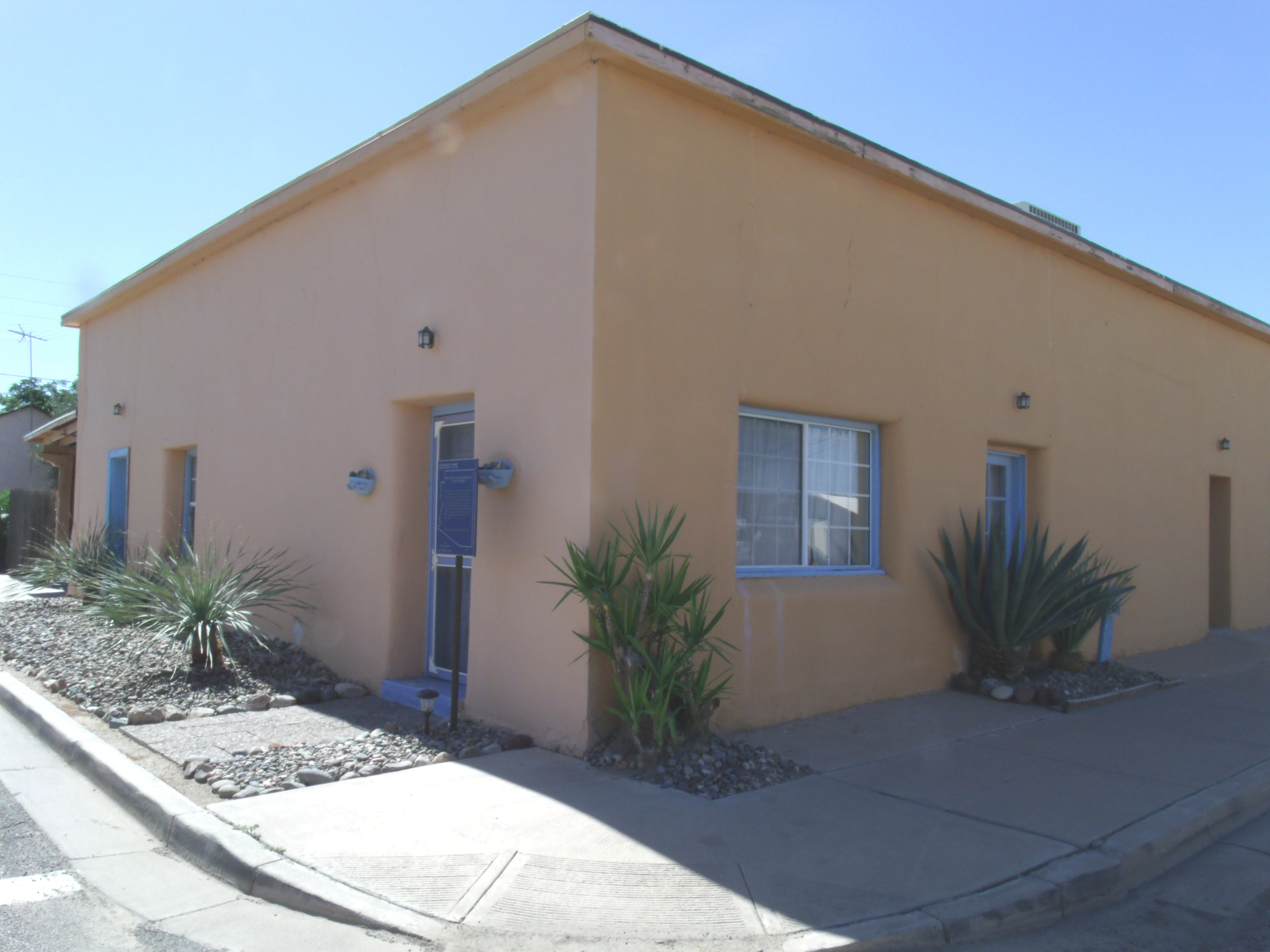
The Jesus Preciado de Luna/ Bernardina Lorona House.

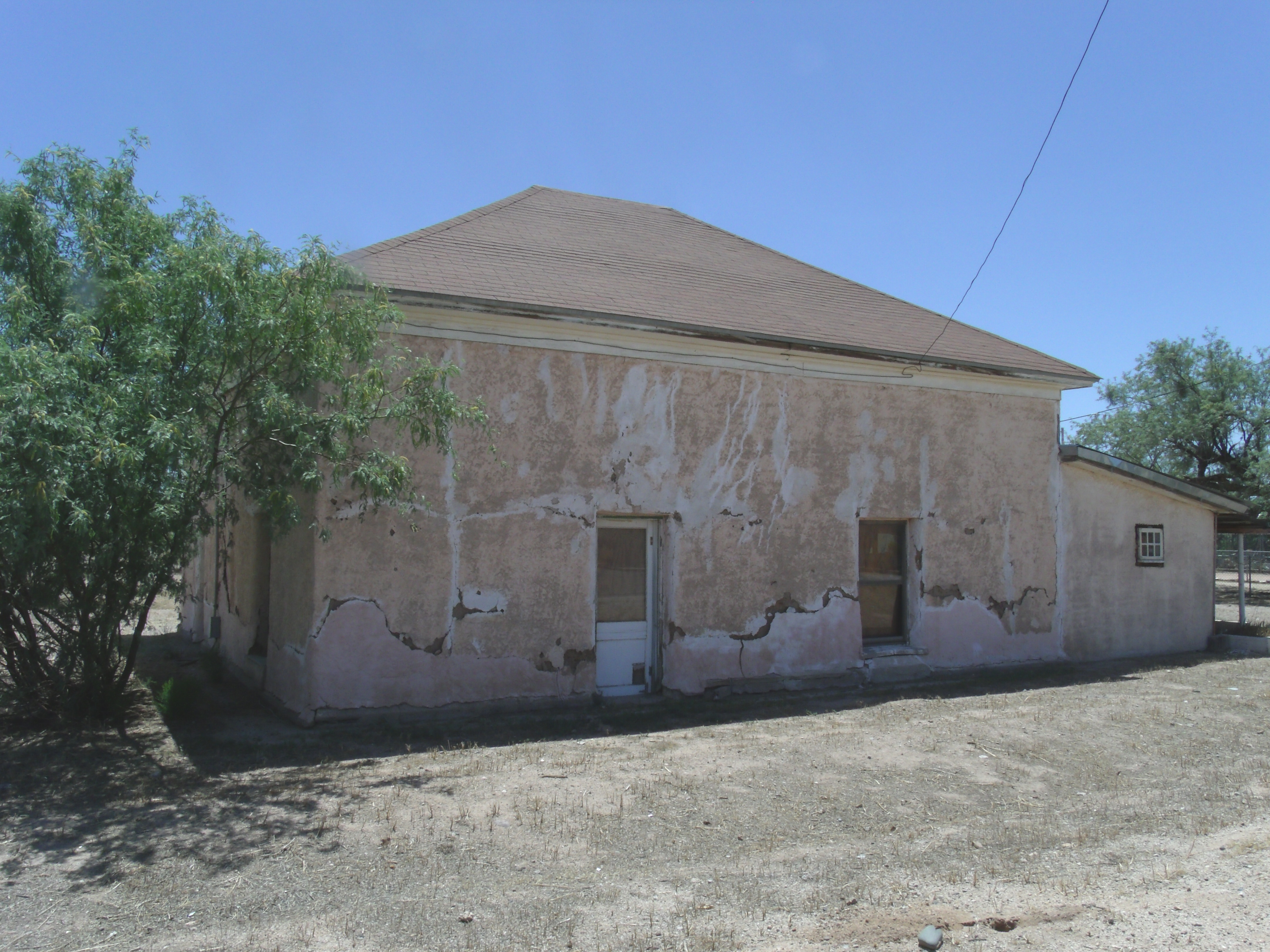
The Fields House.

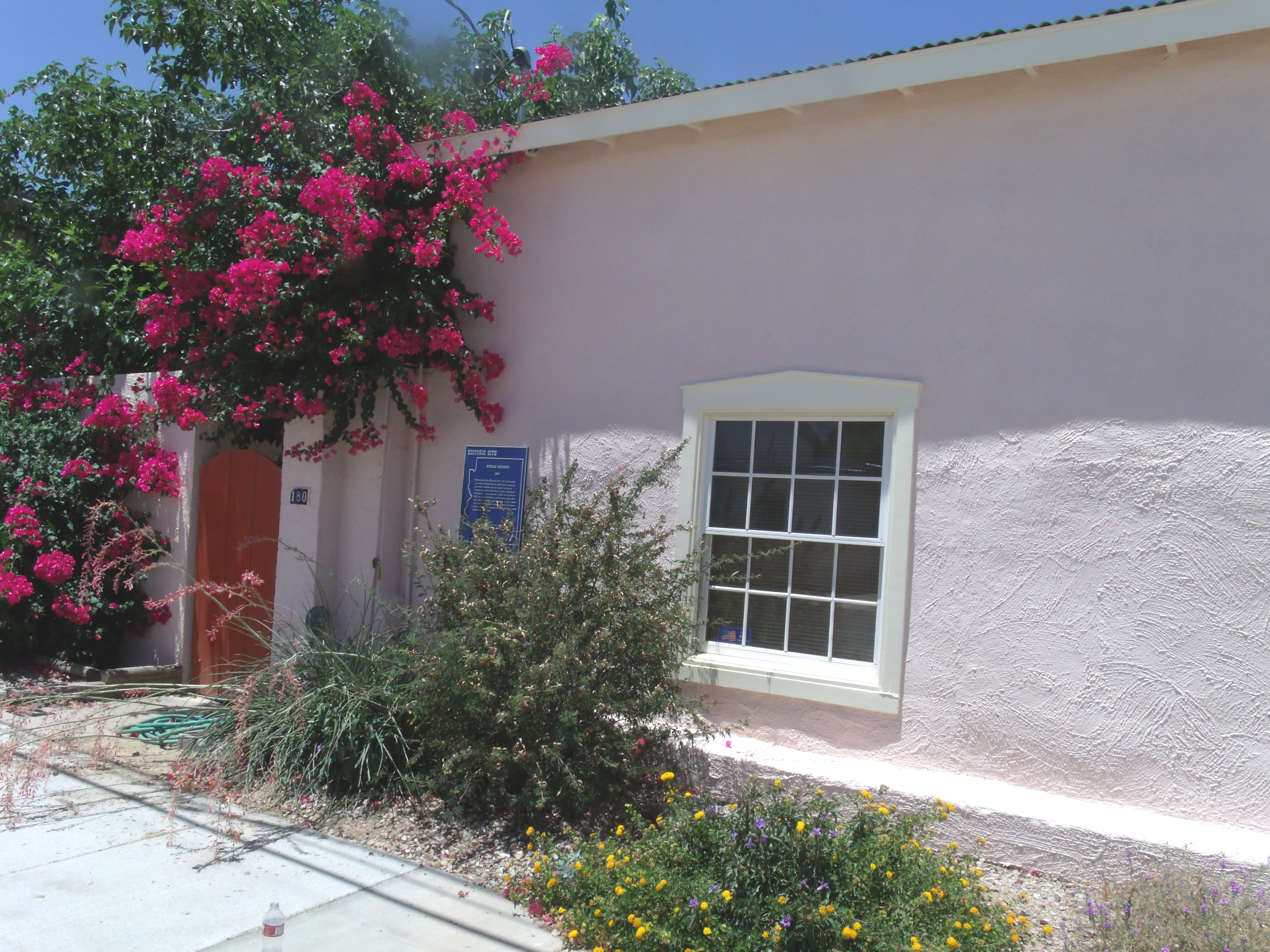
The John Nicolas Residence.

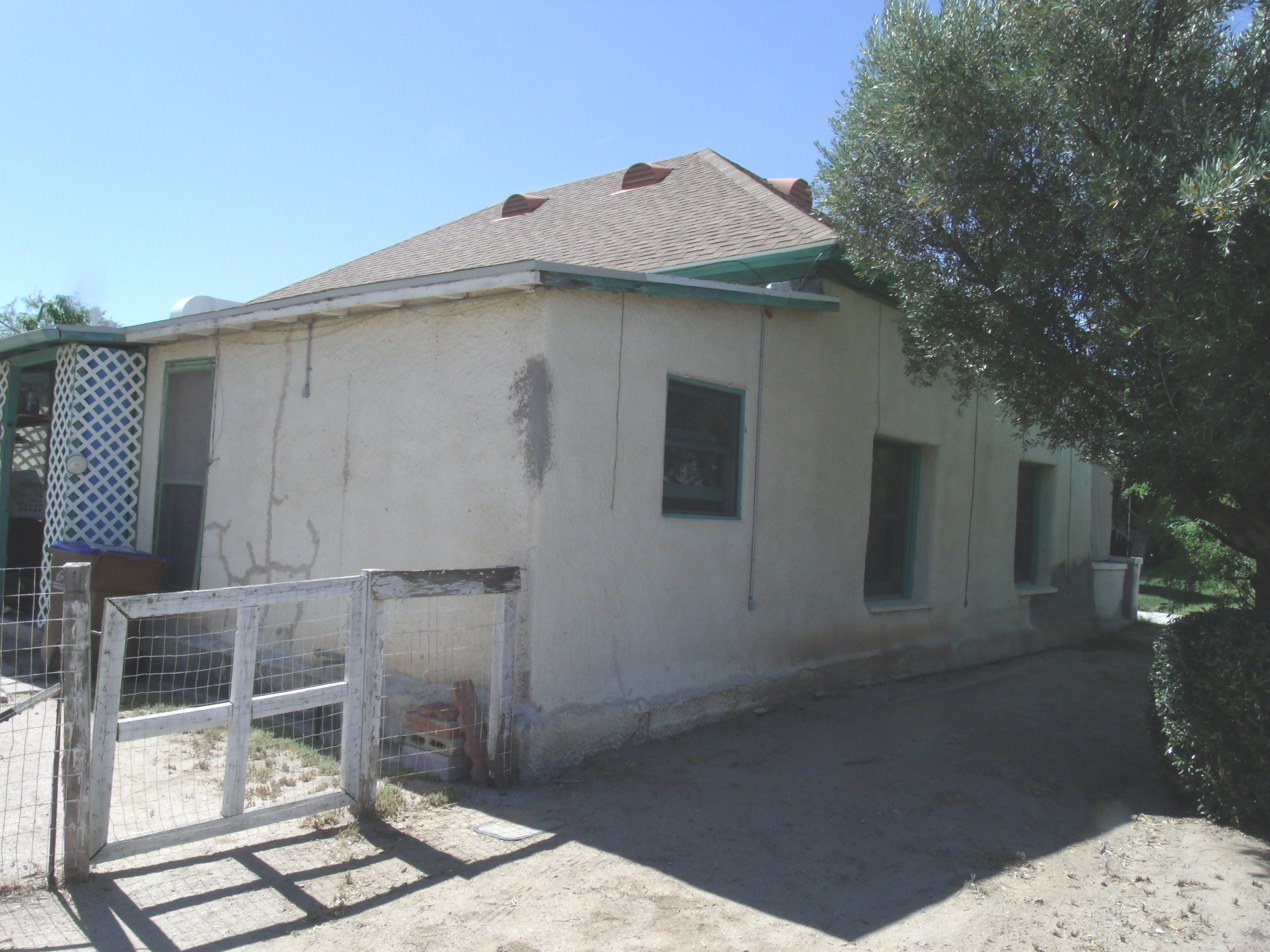
The Sam Kee House.

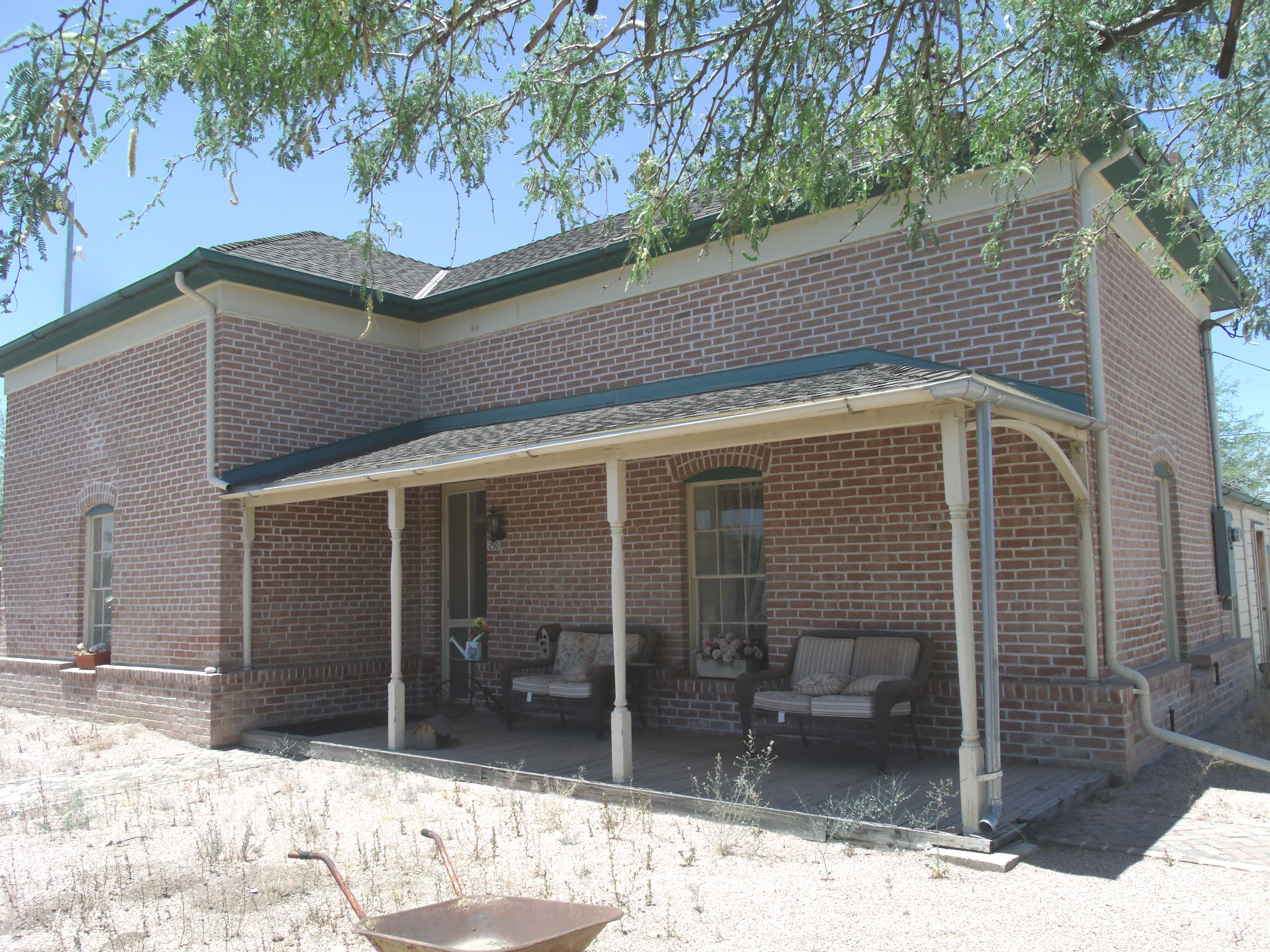
The Harvey-Niemeyer House.

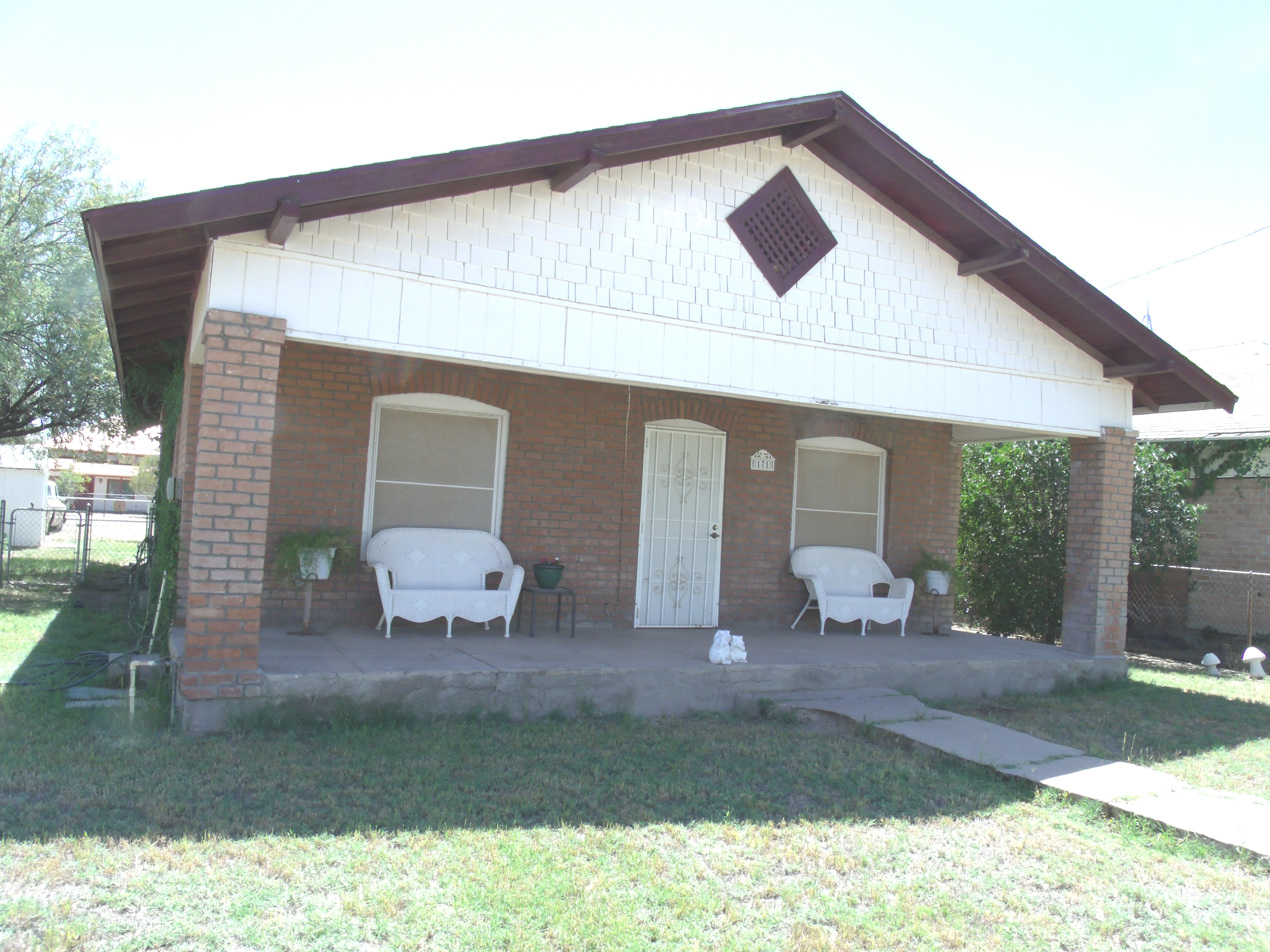
The Emma Monk Guild House.

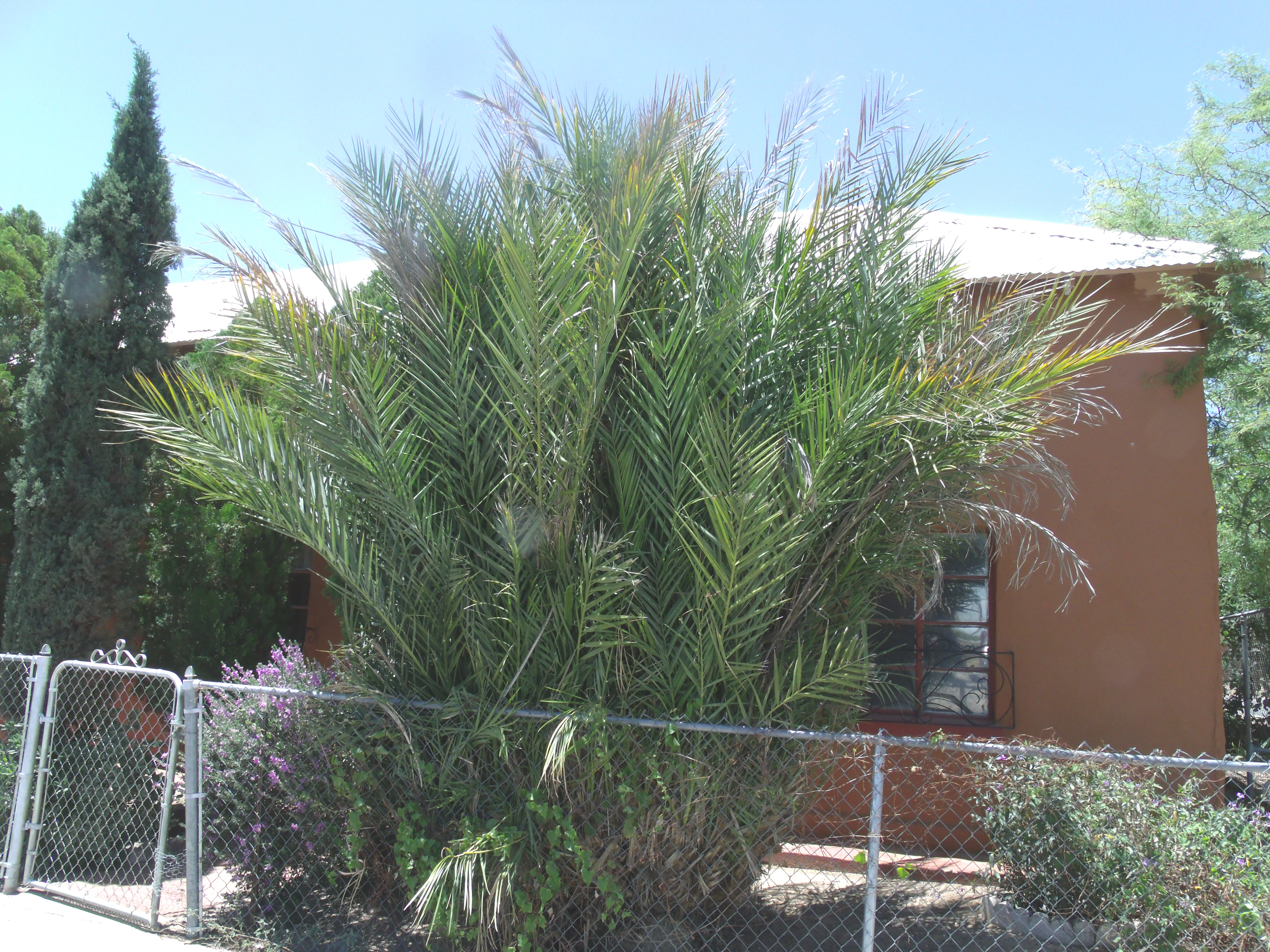
The Elmer Coker House.

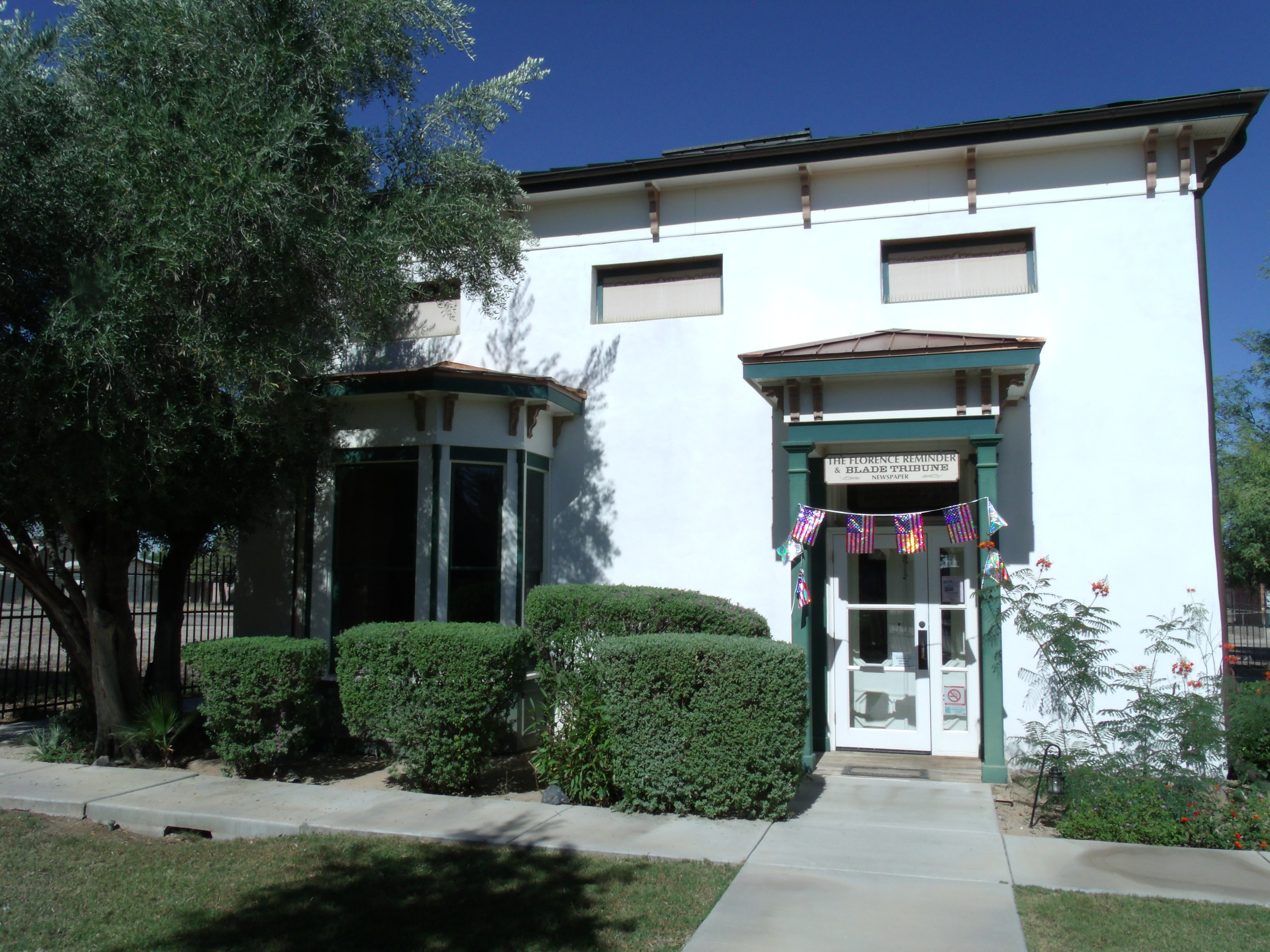
The William Clark House.

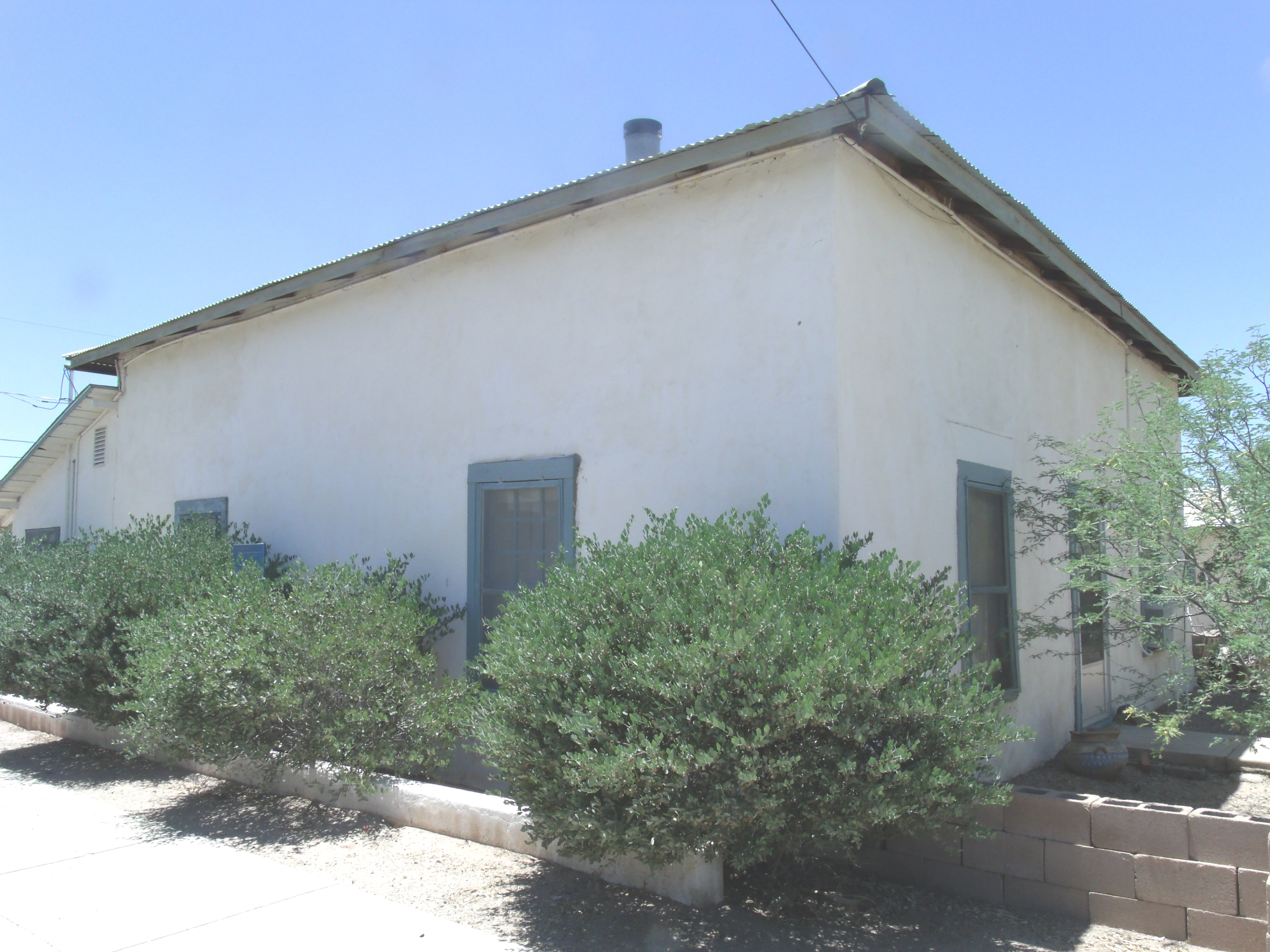
The Andronico Lorona House.

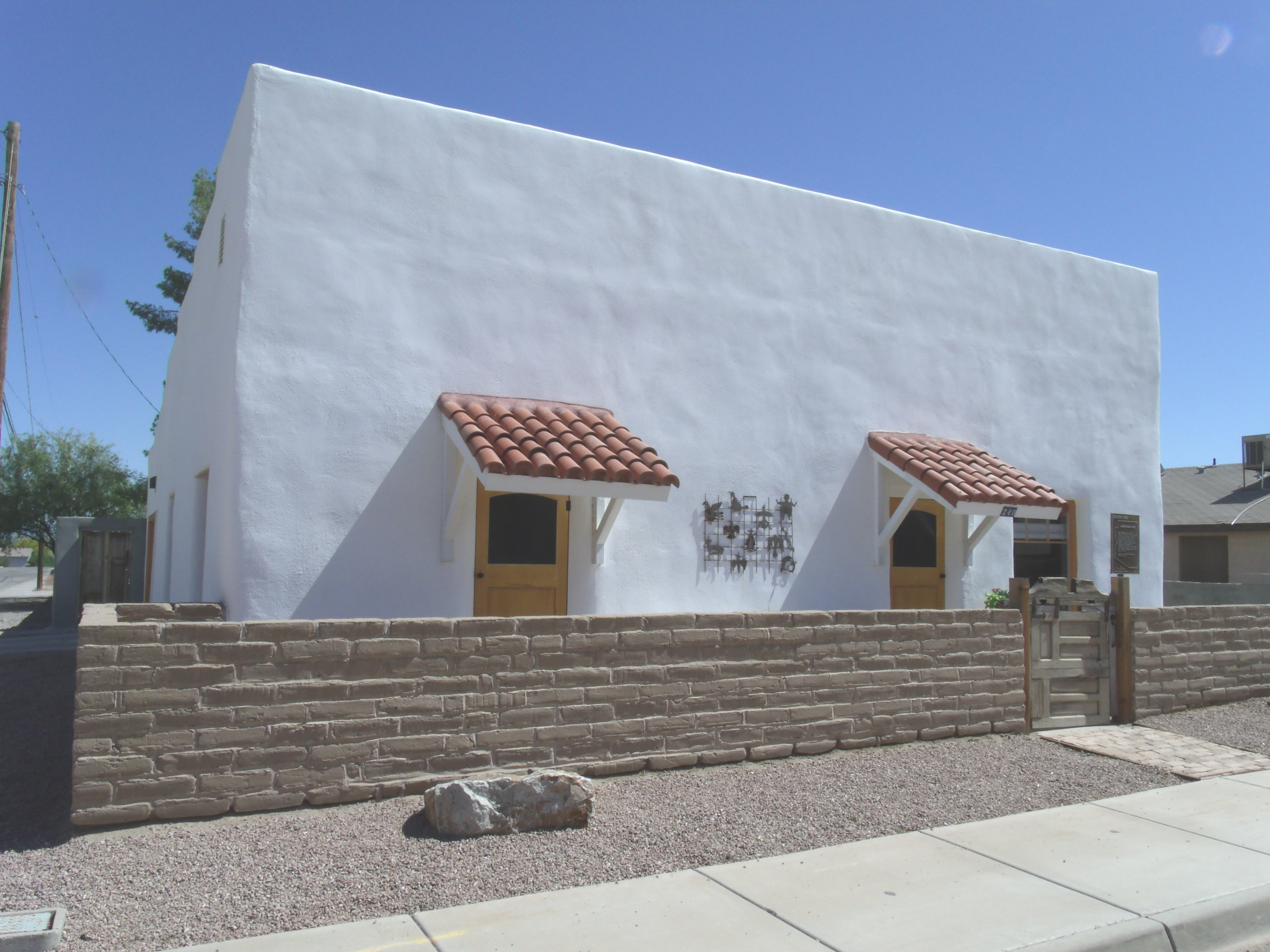
The Carmen Mecha House.

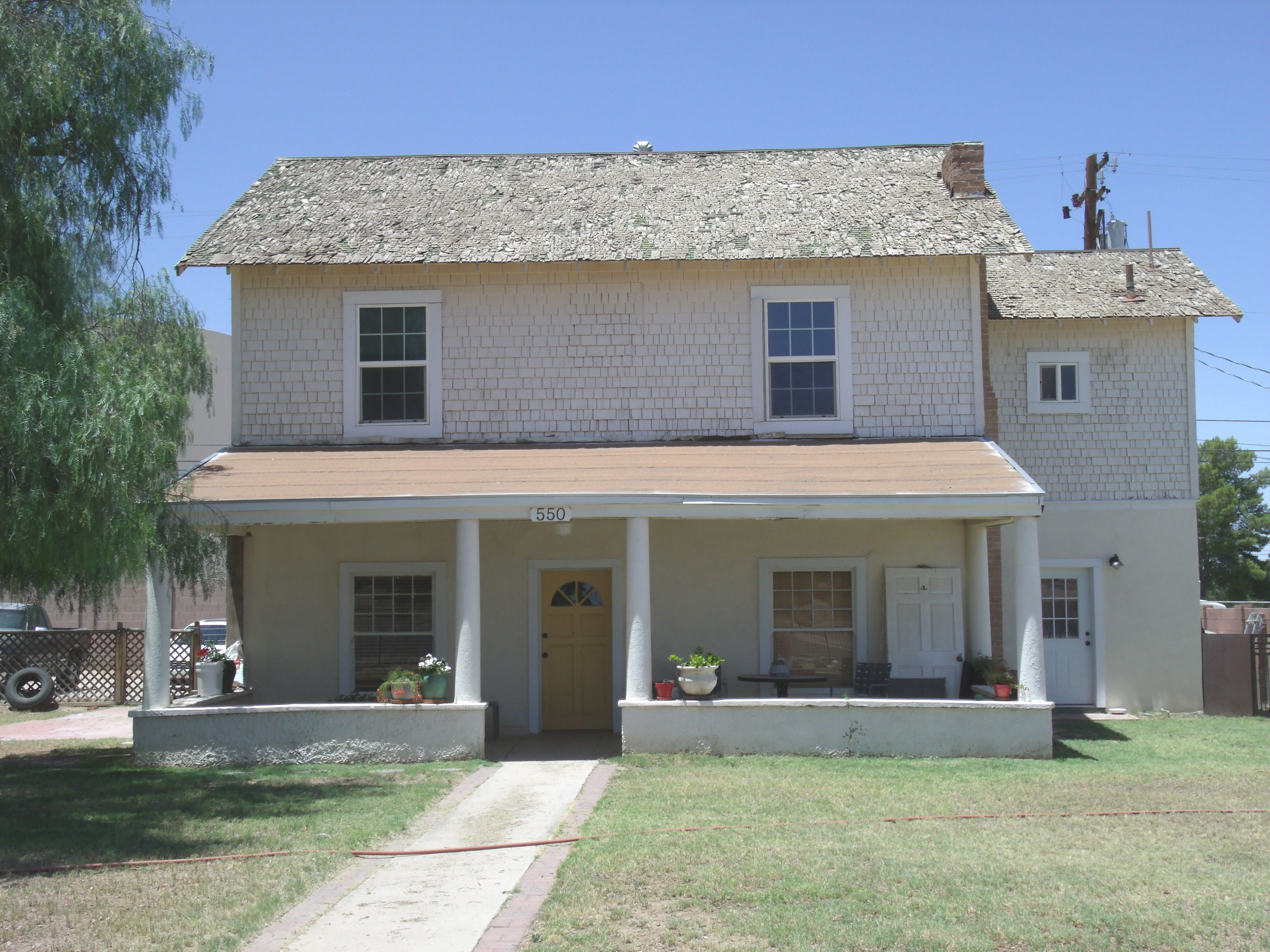
The Truman Randall House.

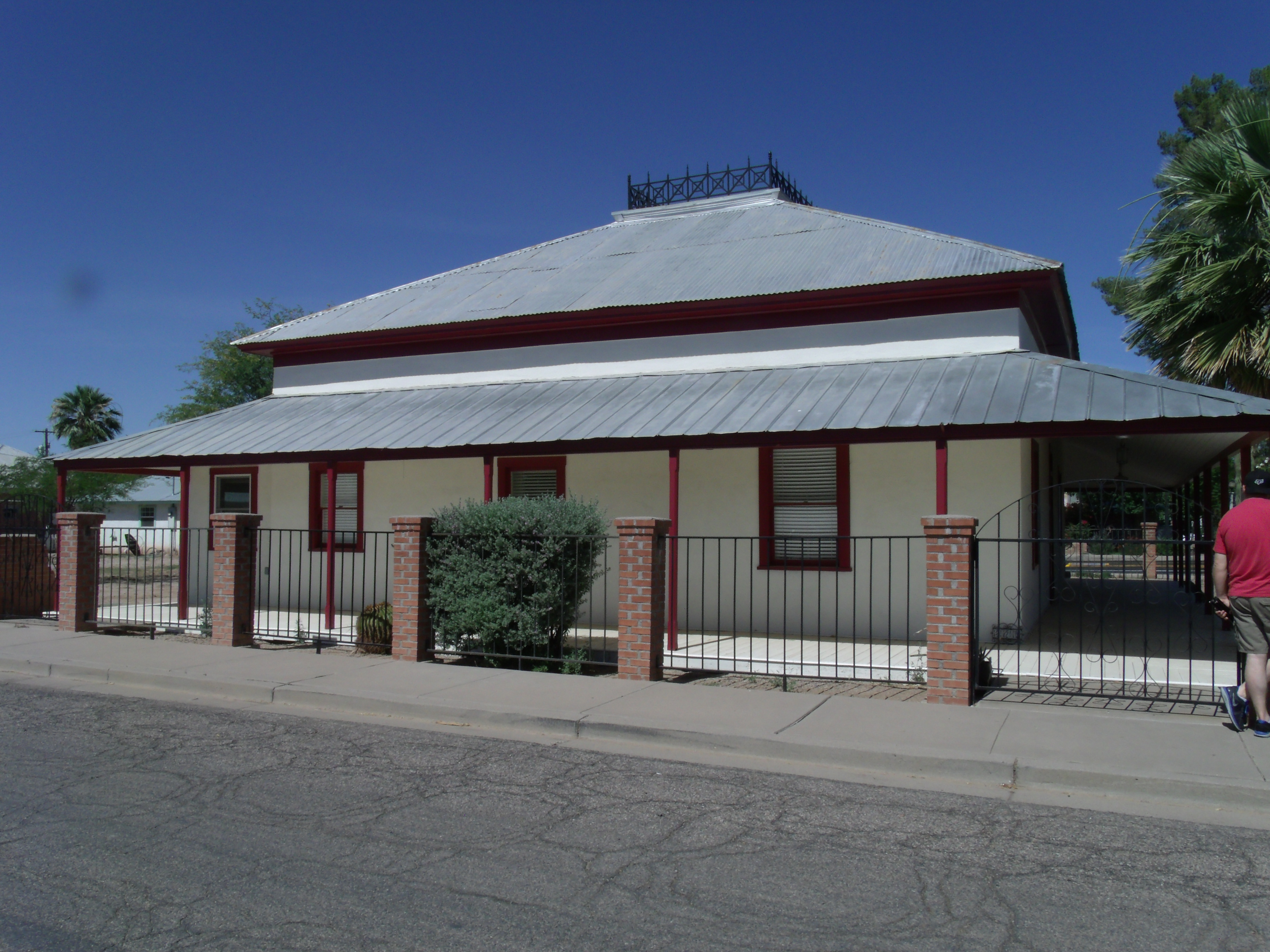
The Jacob Suter House.

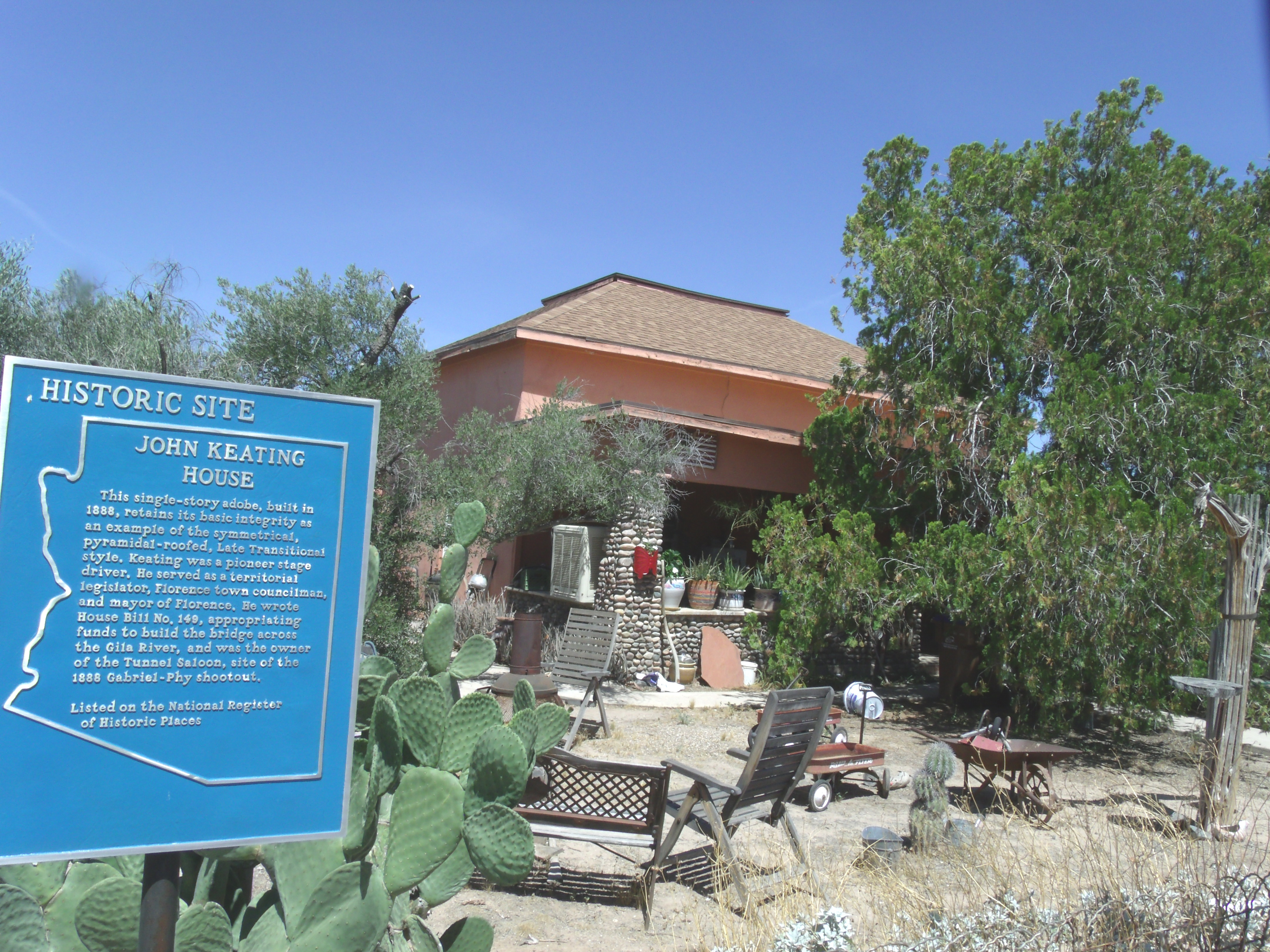
The John Keating House.

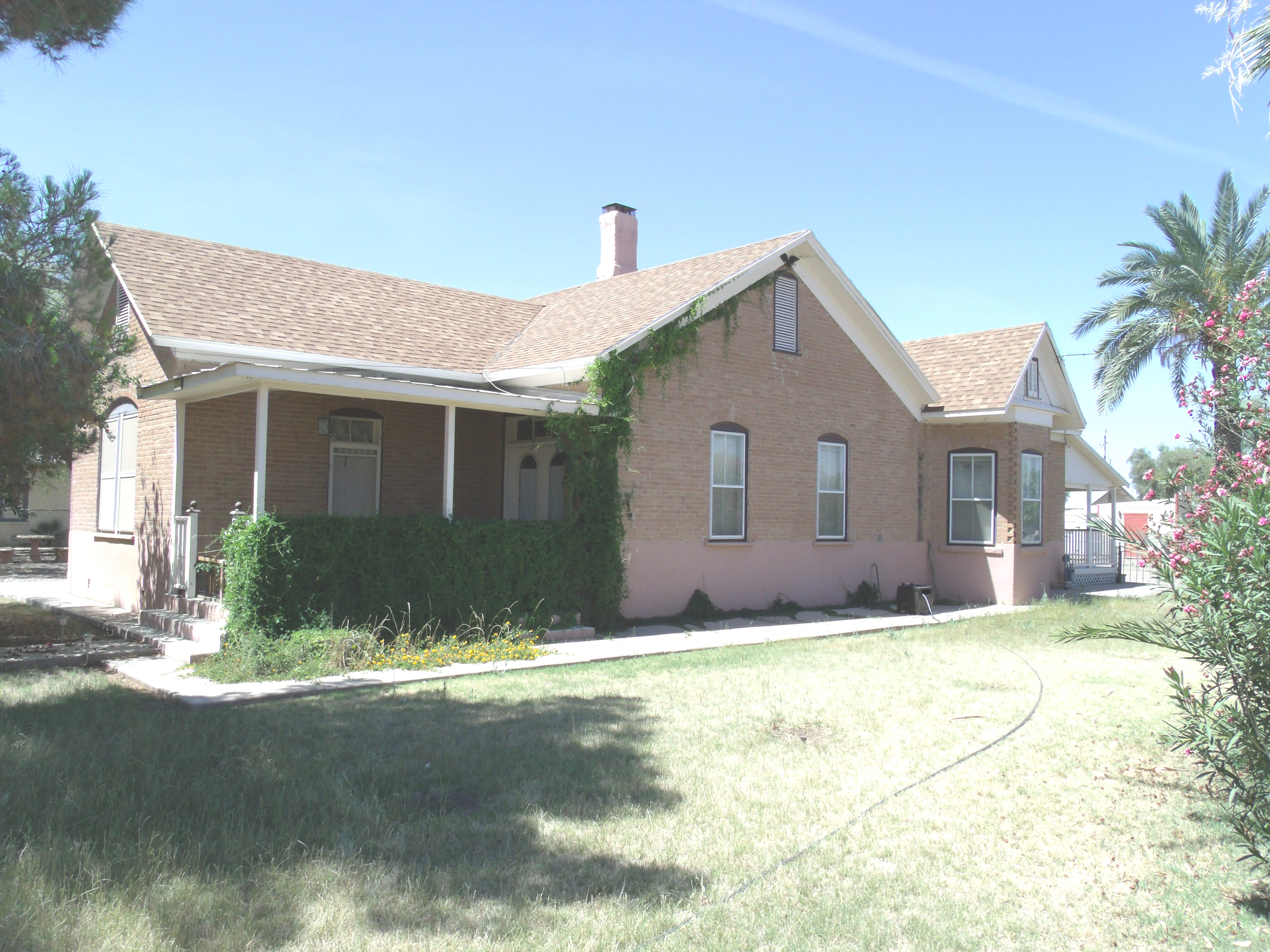
The Albert T. Colton/ H. H. Freeman House.

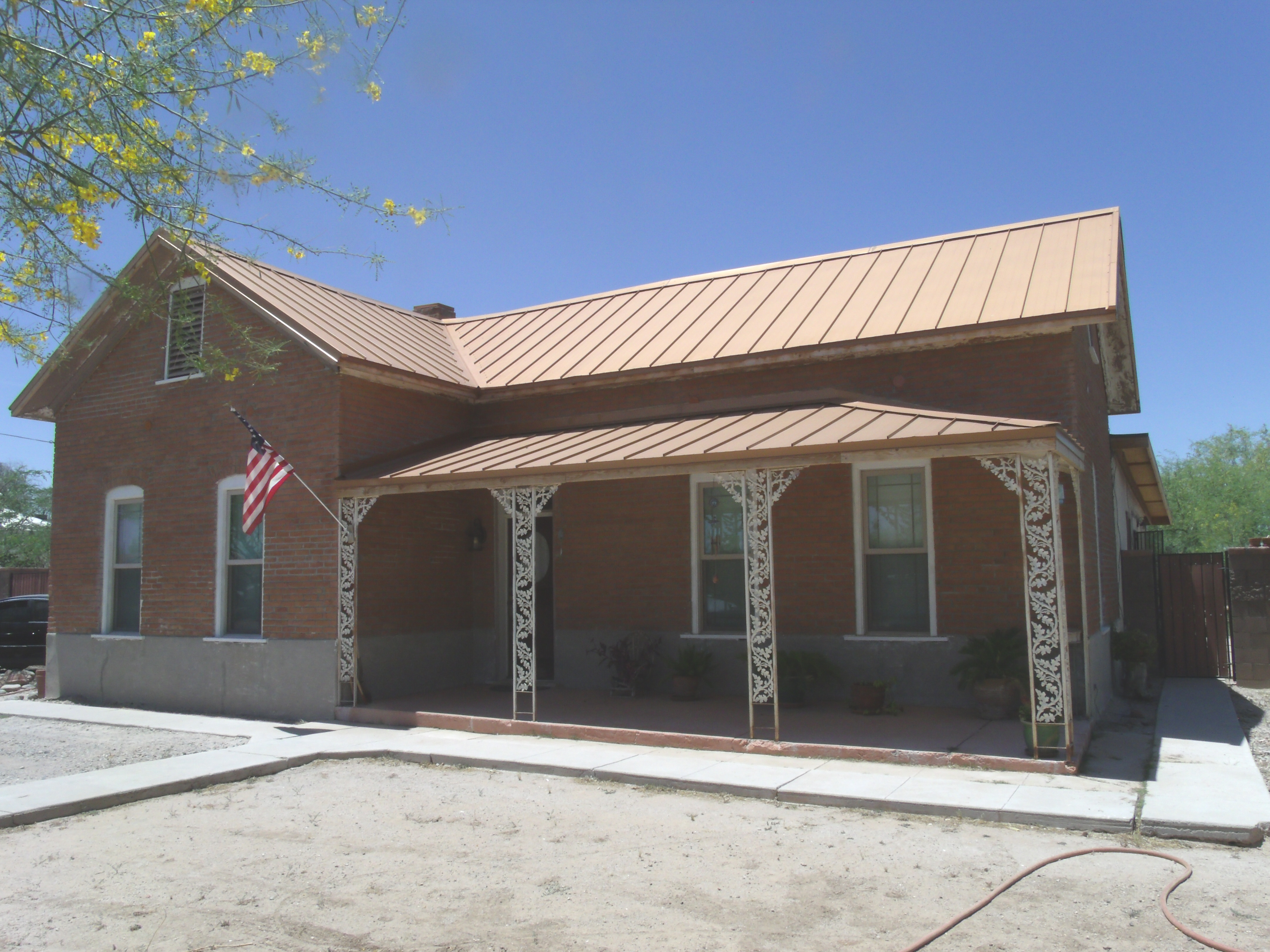
The C.D. Henry House.

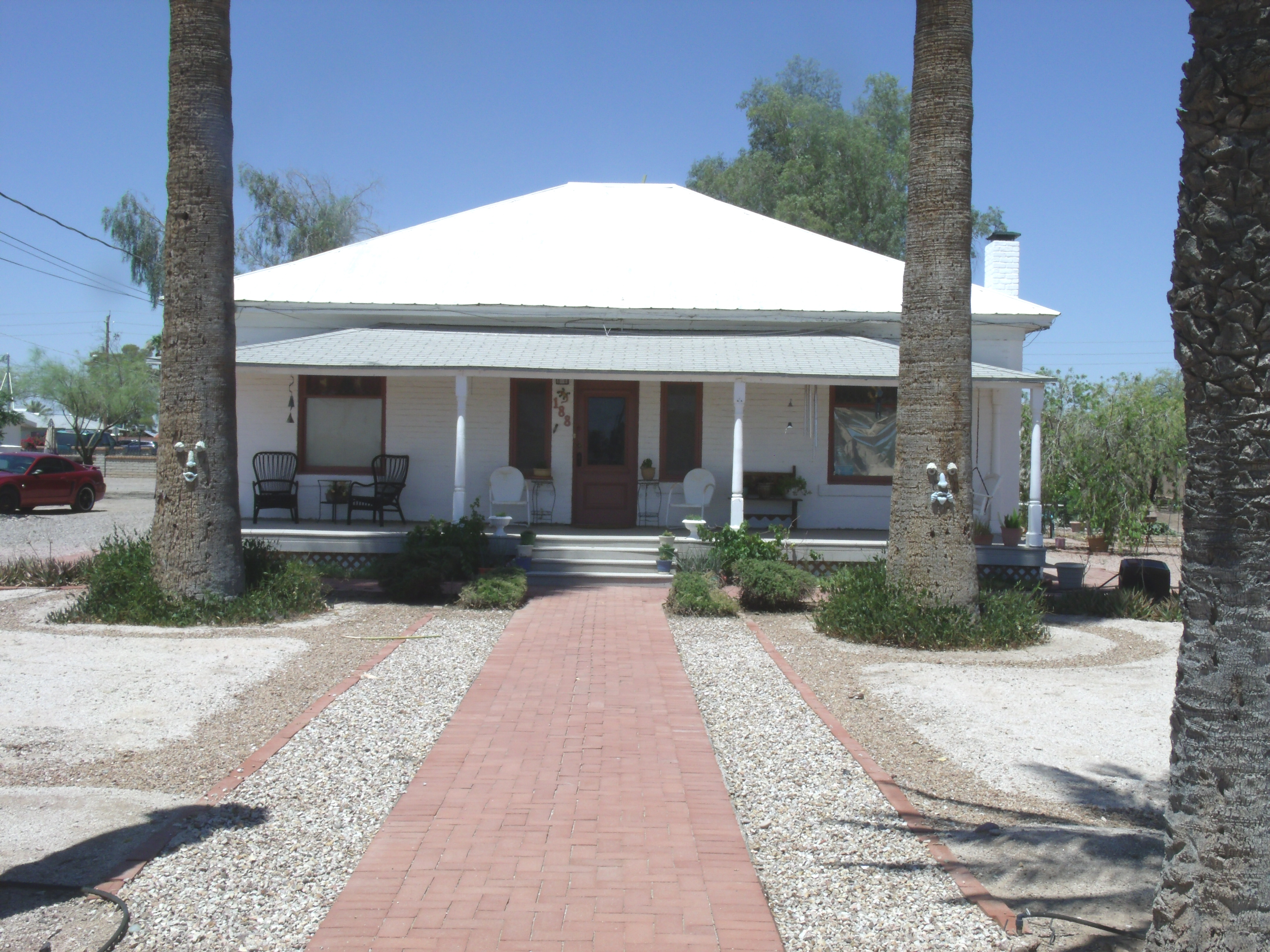
The W.Y. Price House.

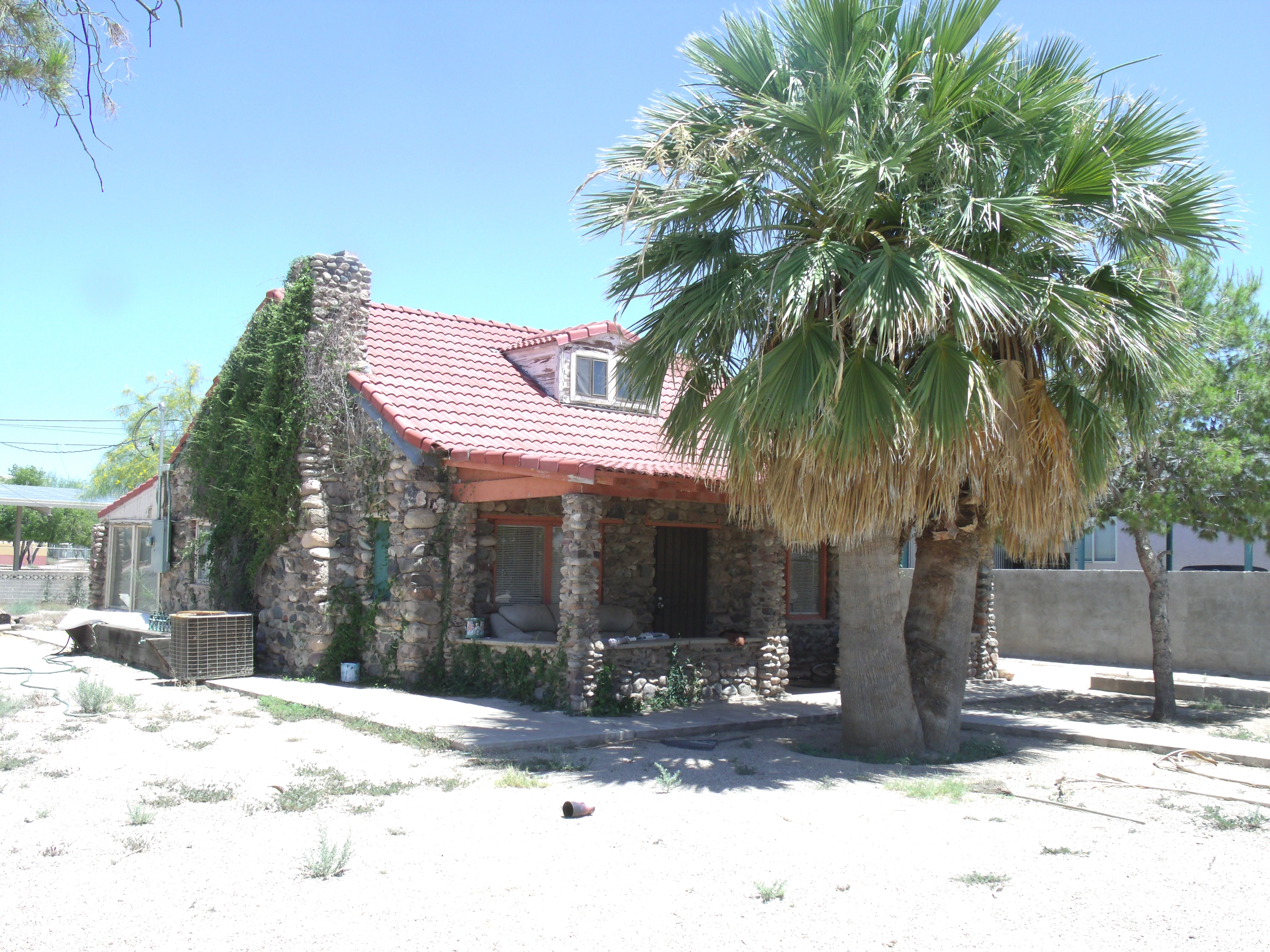
The Ines and Davis Littlefield Bea House.

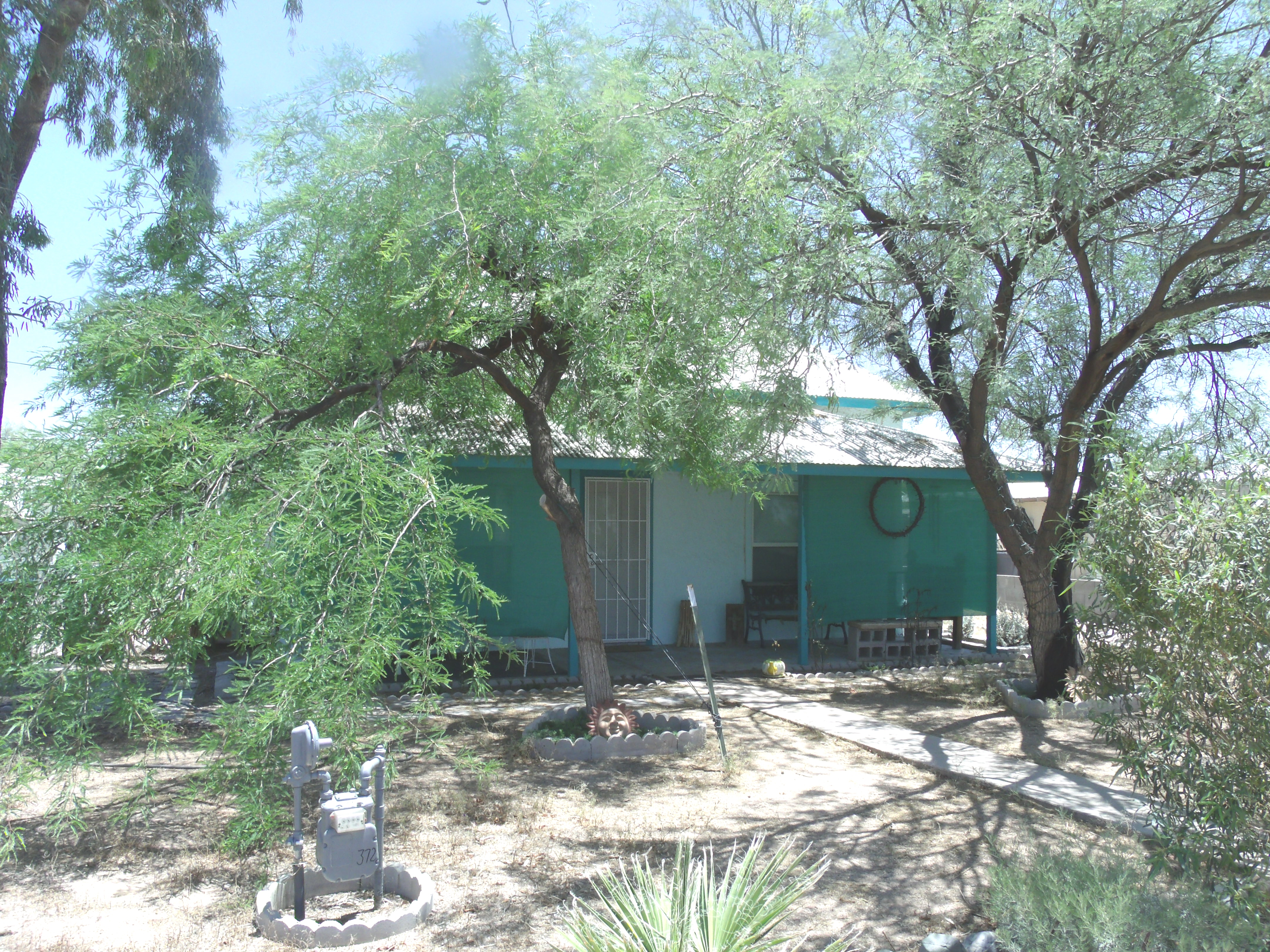
The George Brockway House a.k.a. the Araiza House.

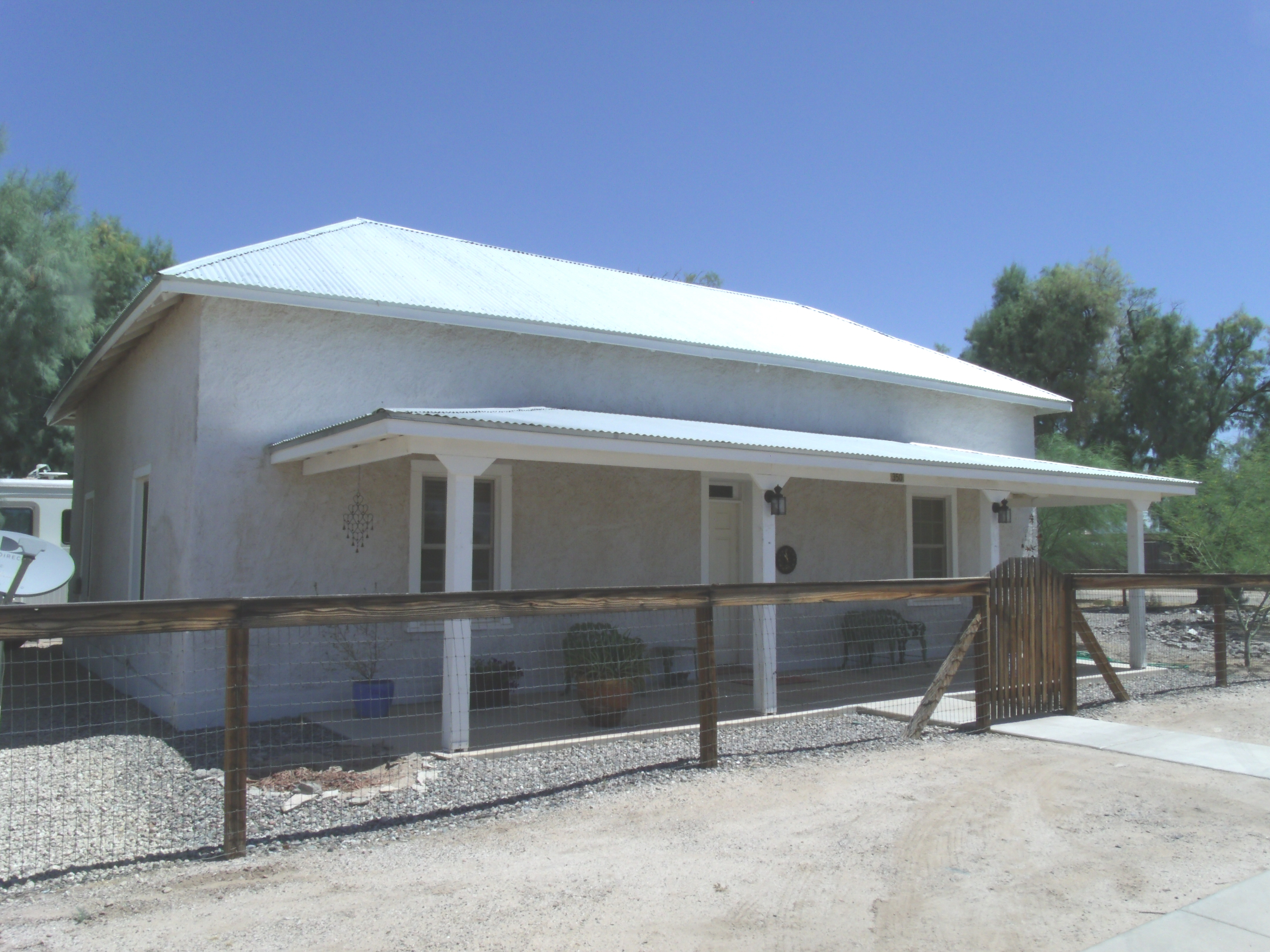
The Carminatte-Parham House.

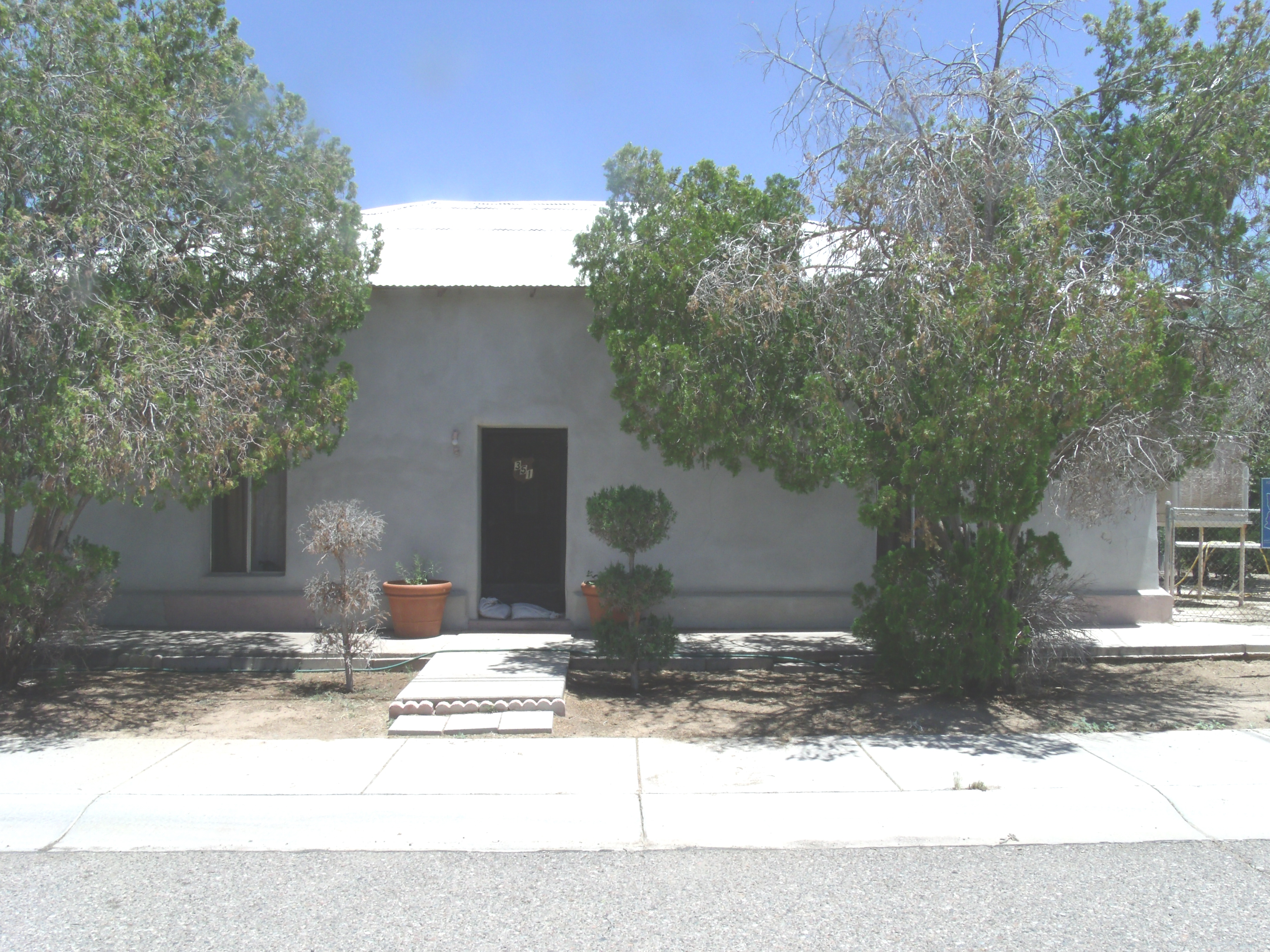
The Ignacio Manjares House.

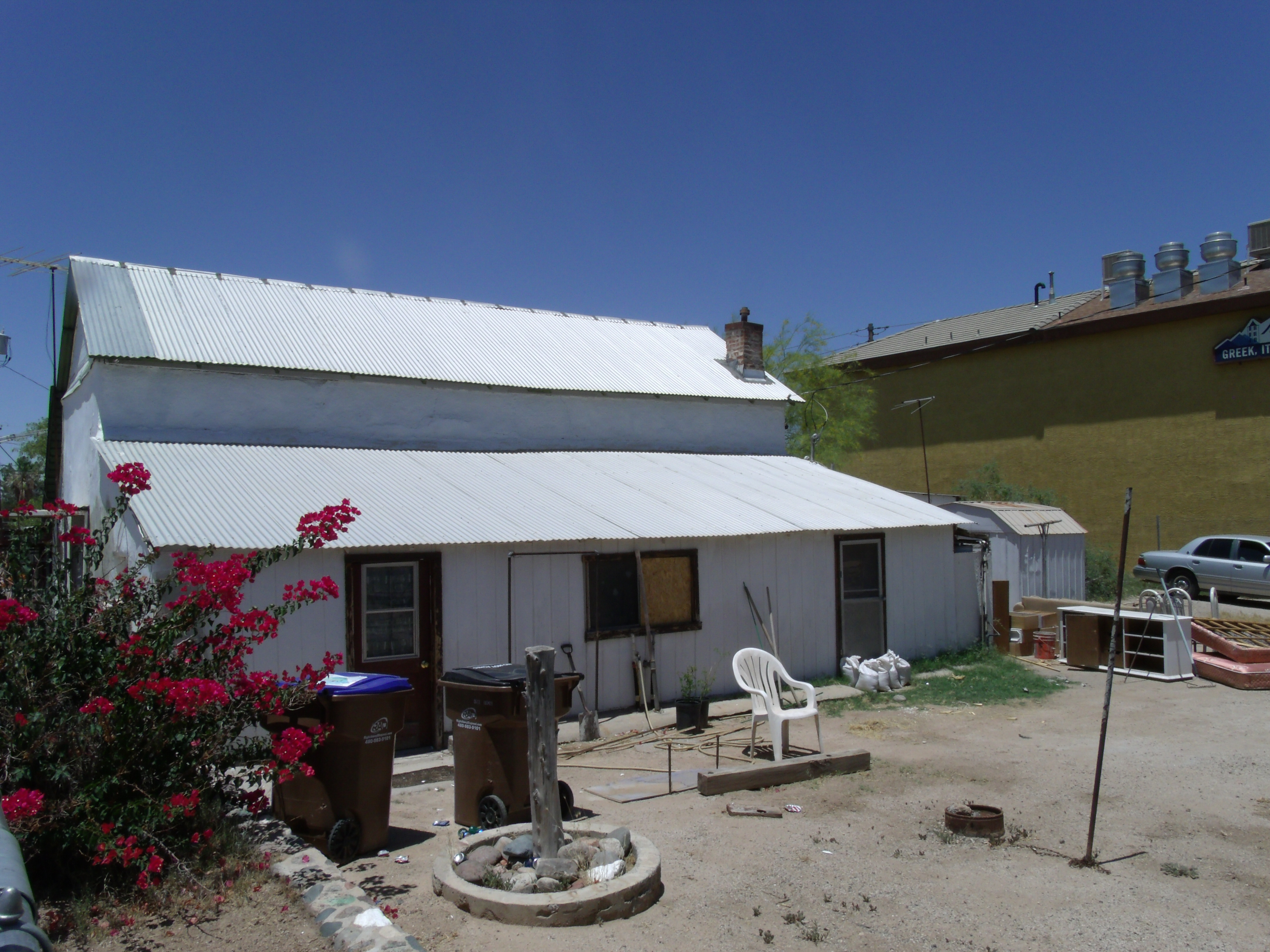
The Adrian Pierson House.

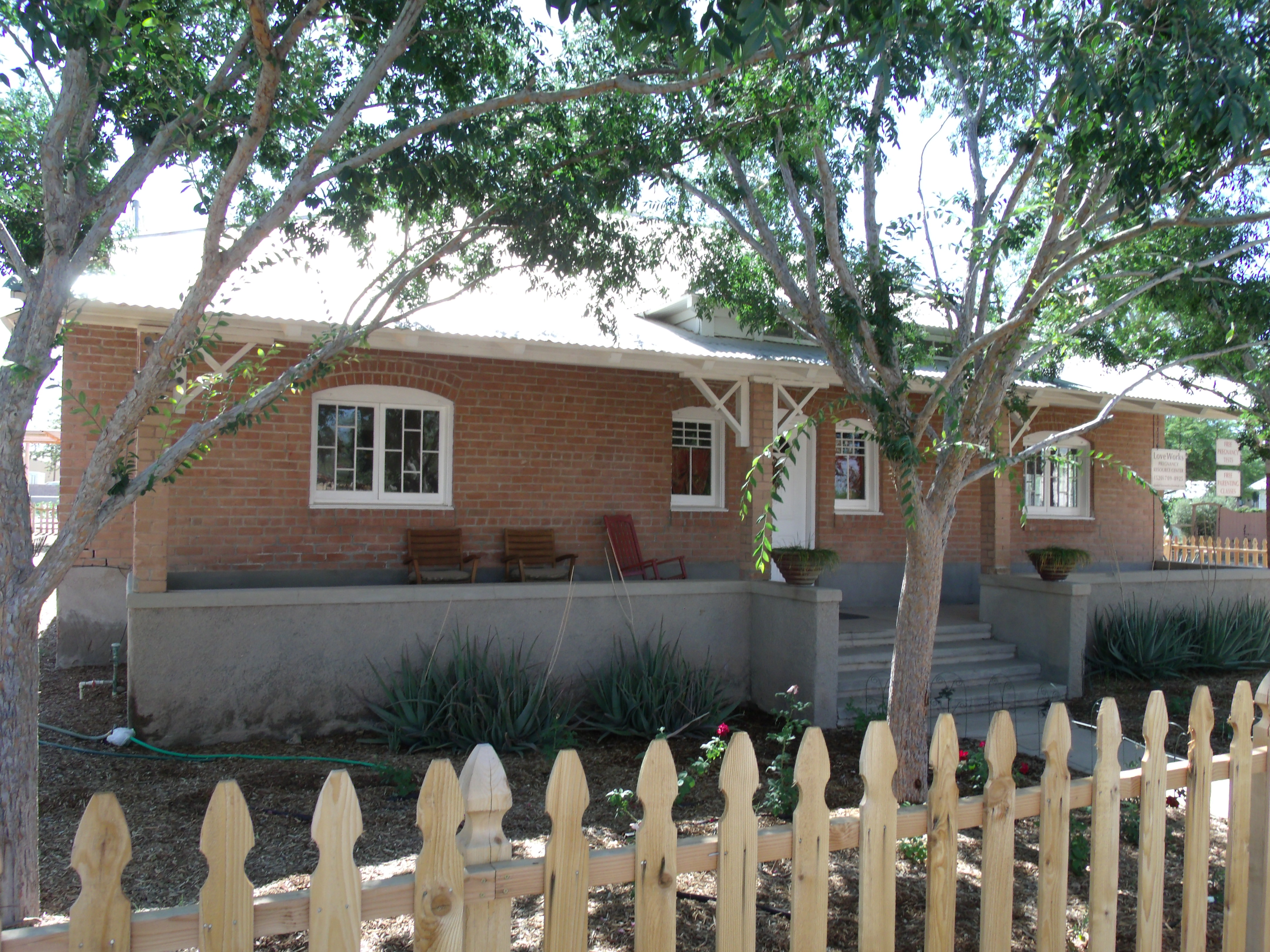
The Joseph Spinas Rental House.

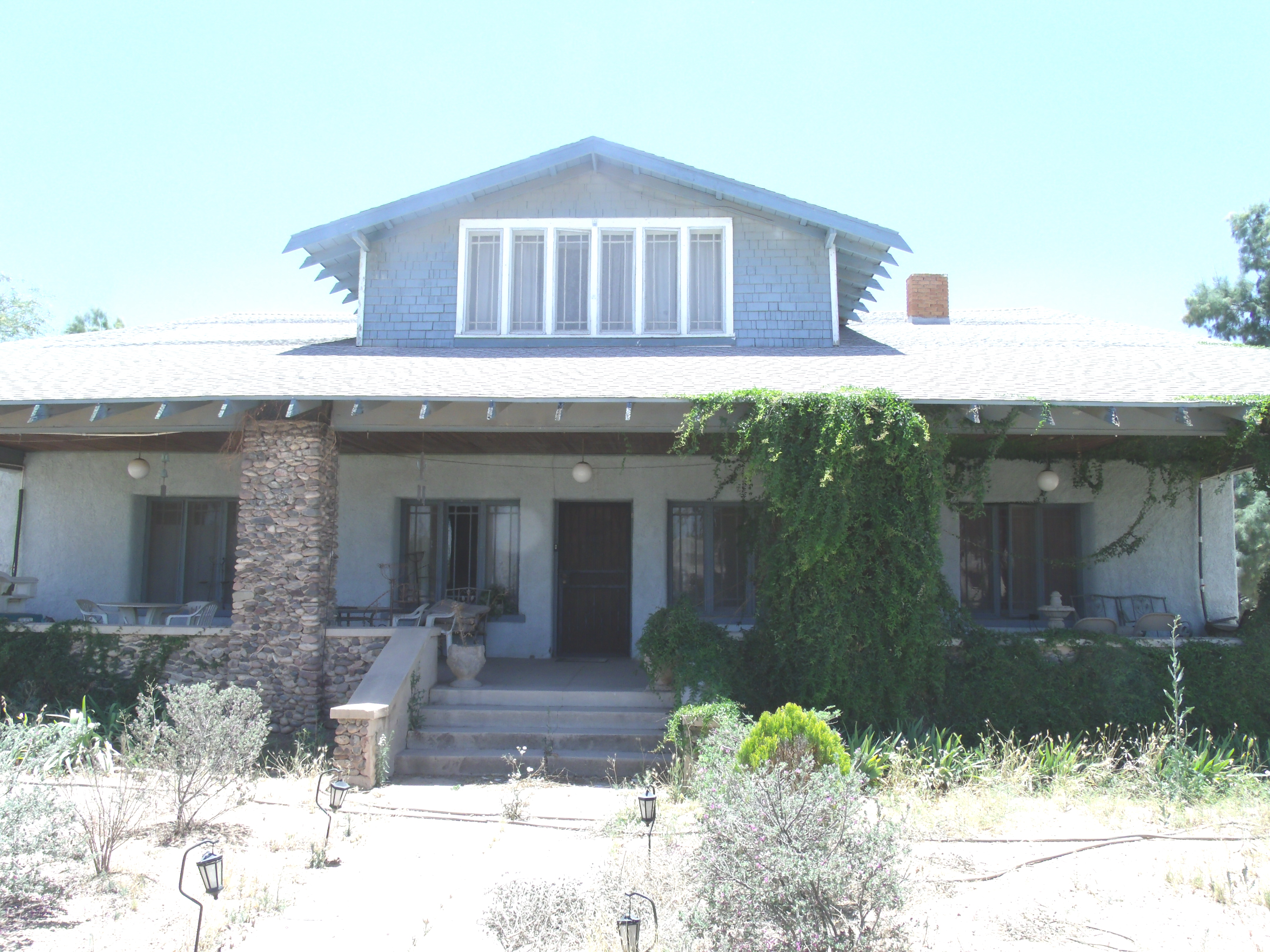
The George Huffman House.

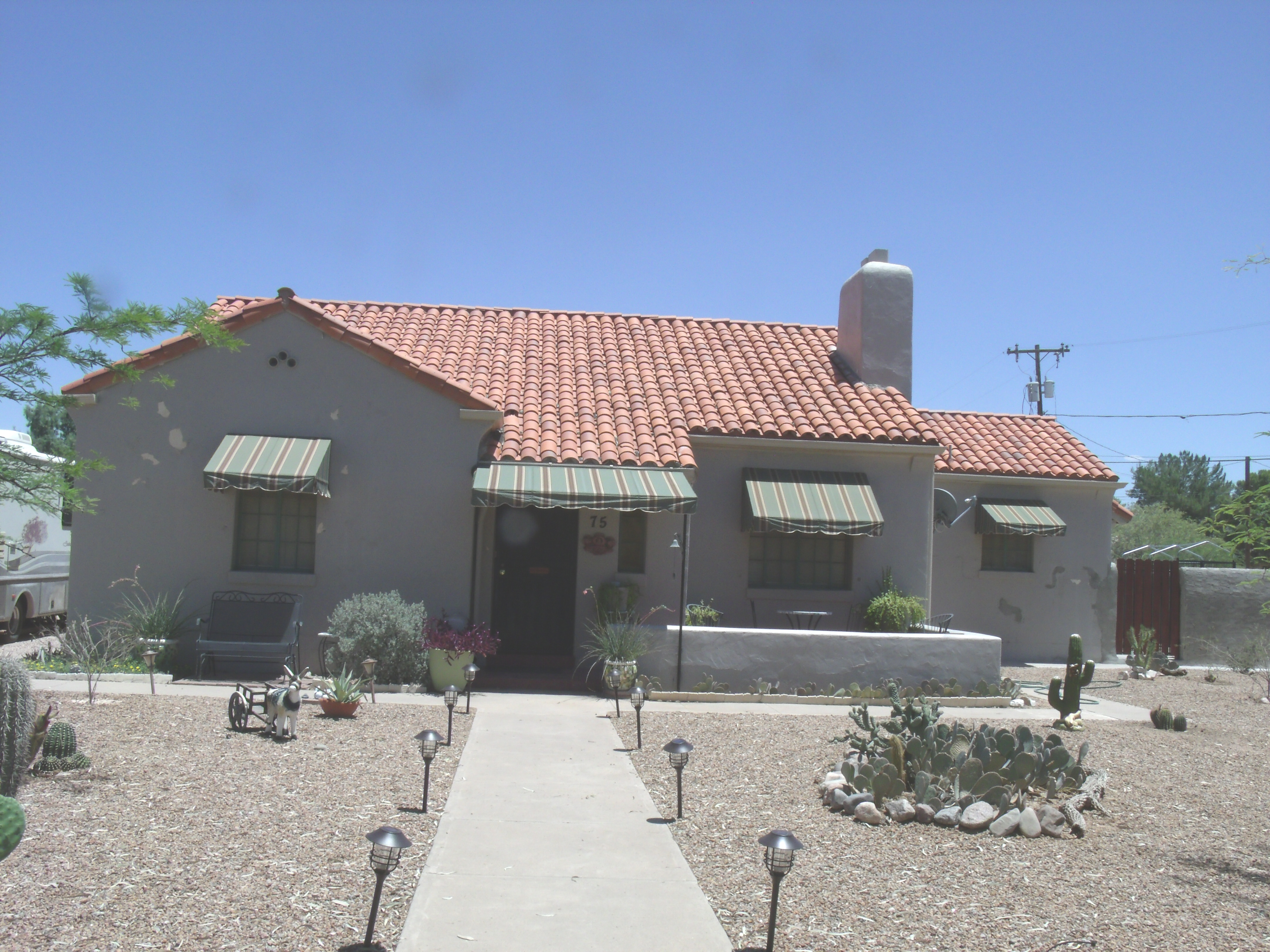
The Thomas Fulbright House.

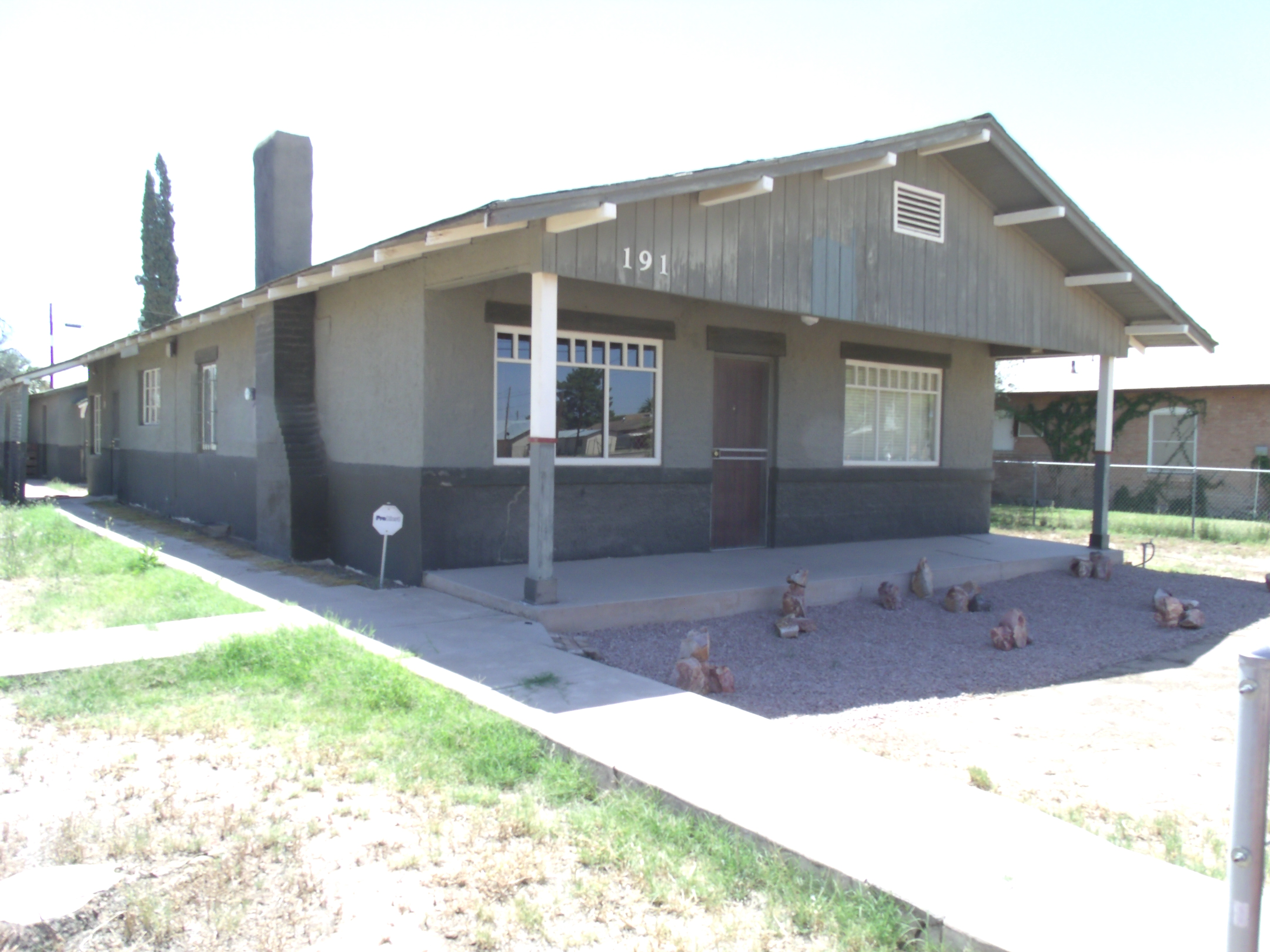
The John Zellinger House.

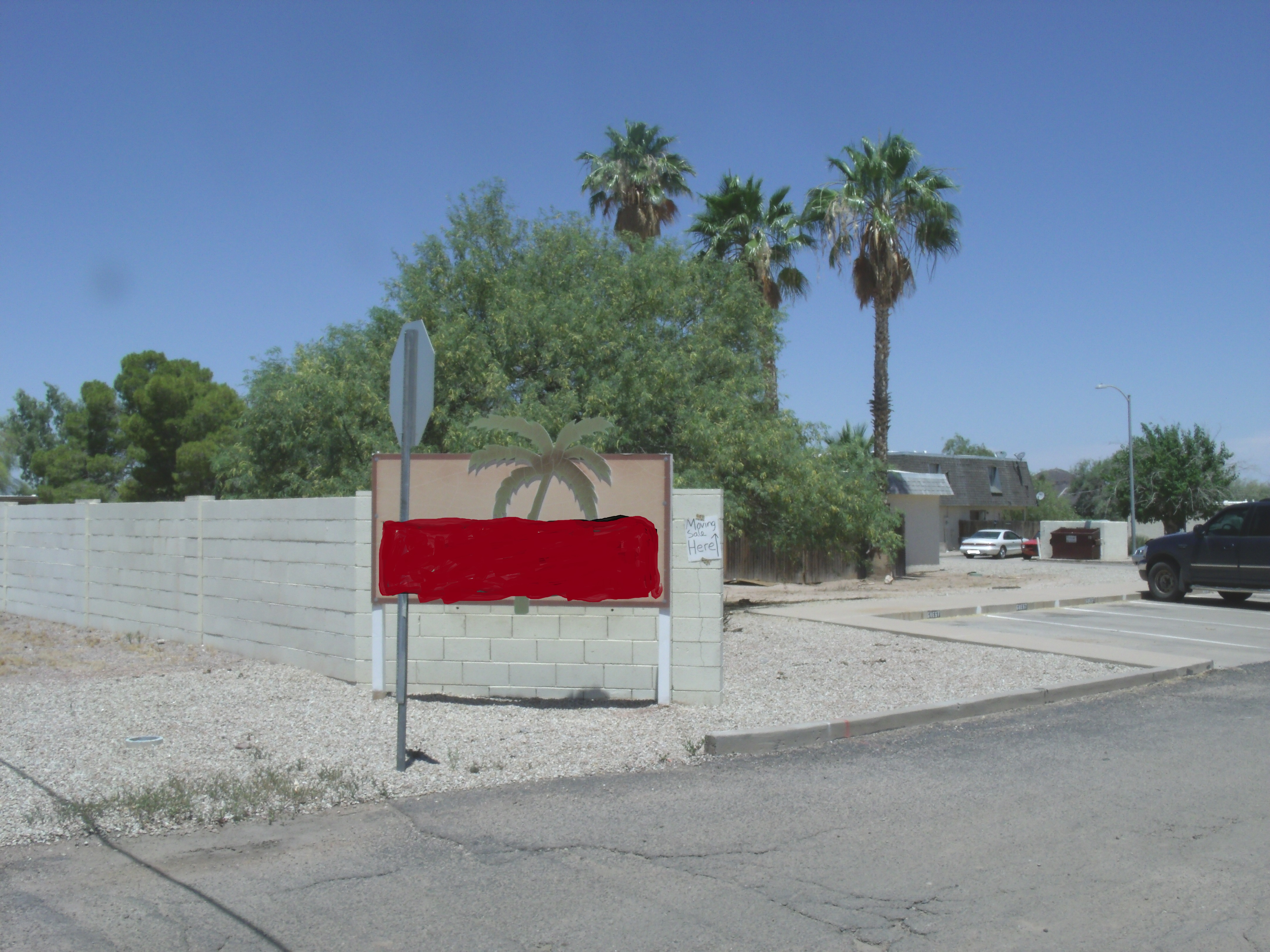
9th, Willow and Central Street.

=== Bridges ===
- The historic Florence Bridge – was originally built in 1885 over the Gila River. It was rebuilt in 1909 and is the third oldest Arizona Territory bridge still in use in Arizona.
- The Queen Creek Bridge – built in 1916 and located in the Old Florence Highway over Queen Creek. It was listed in the National Register of Historic Places on September 30, 1988, reference: #88001643.
Historic bridges
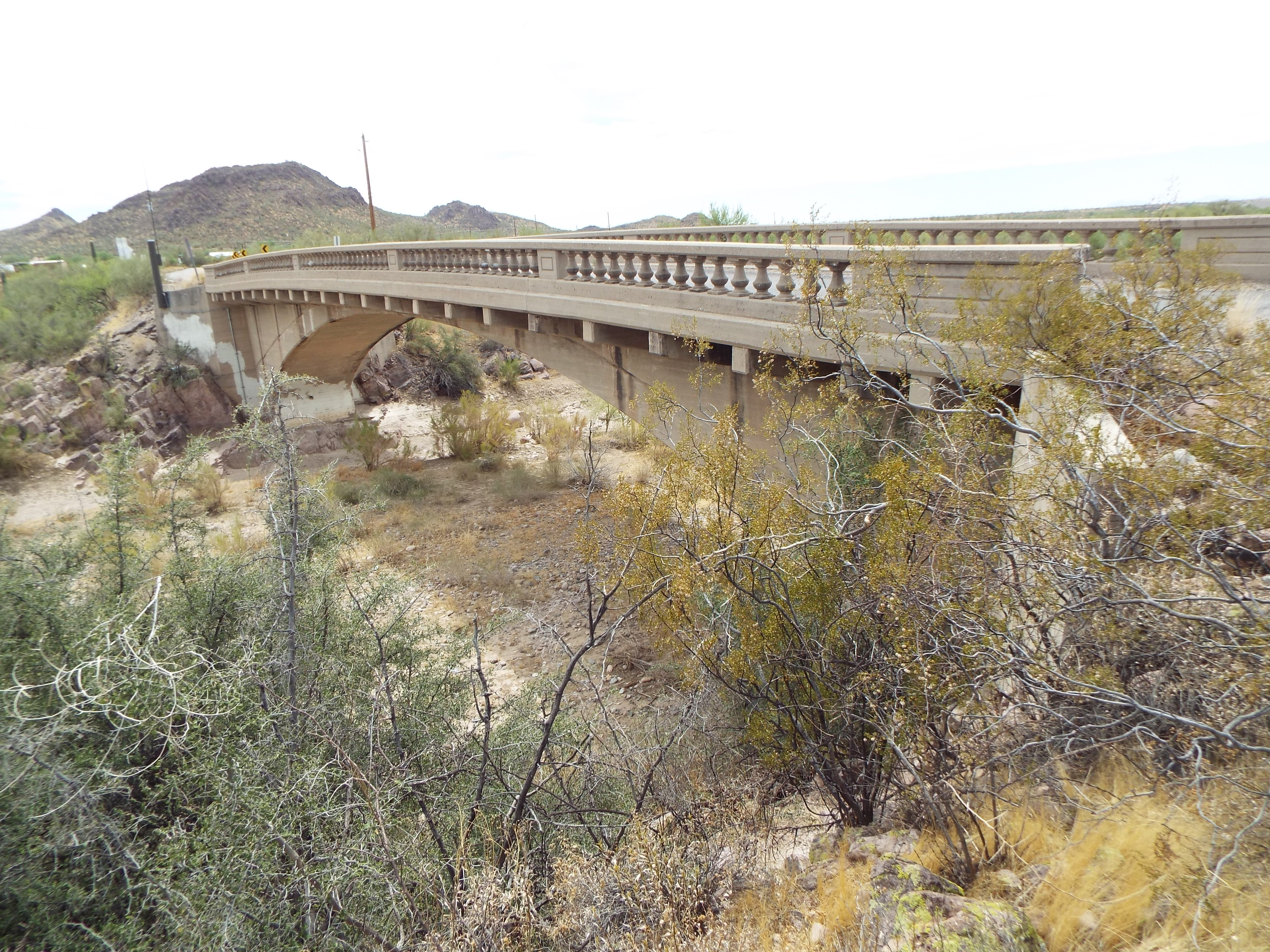
The Queen Creek Bridge (Florence) – 1916

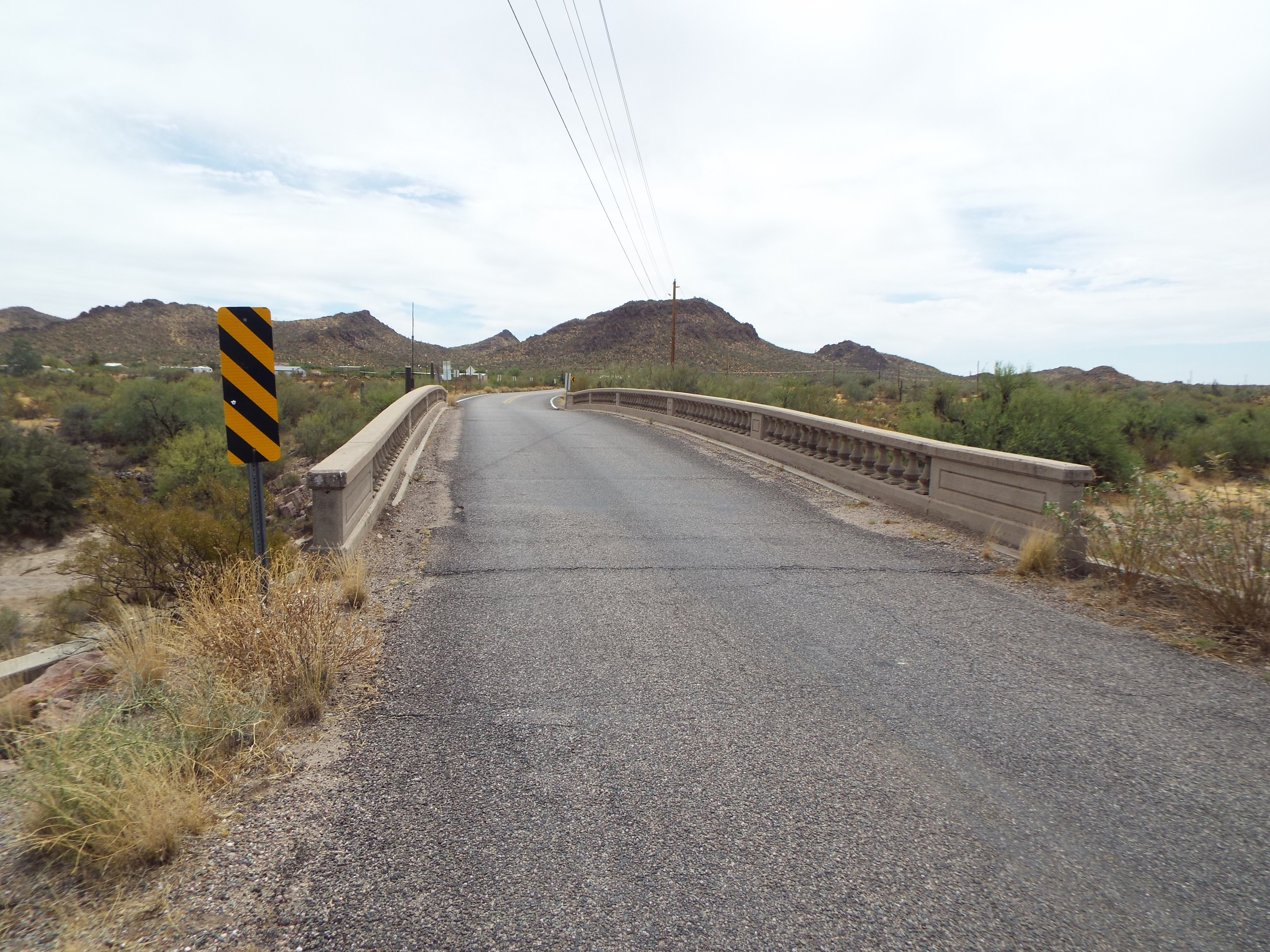
Different view of the Queen Creek Bridge (Florence)

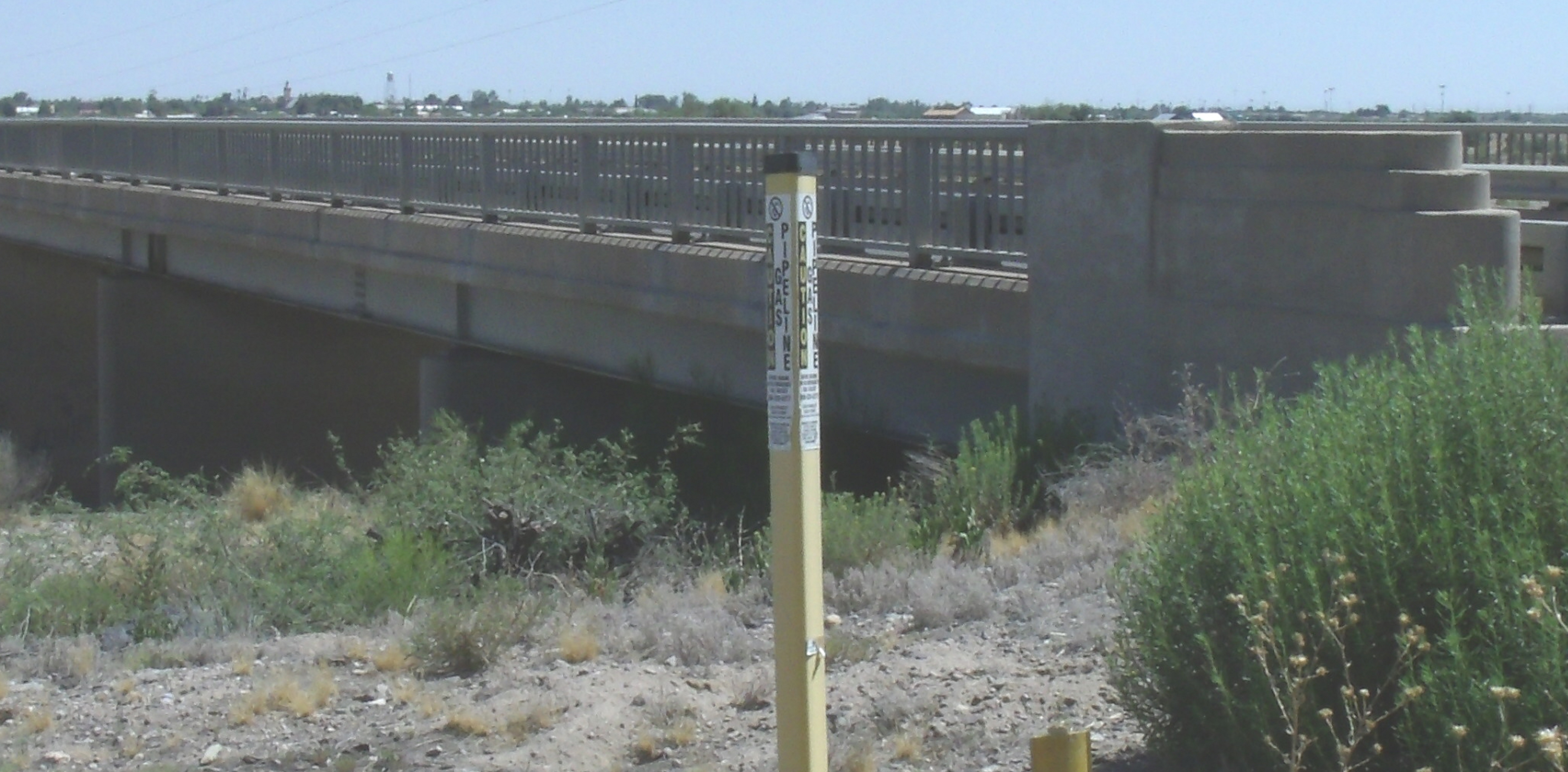
Historic Florence Bridge over the Gila River rebuilt in 1909.

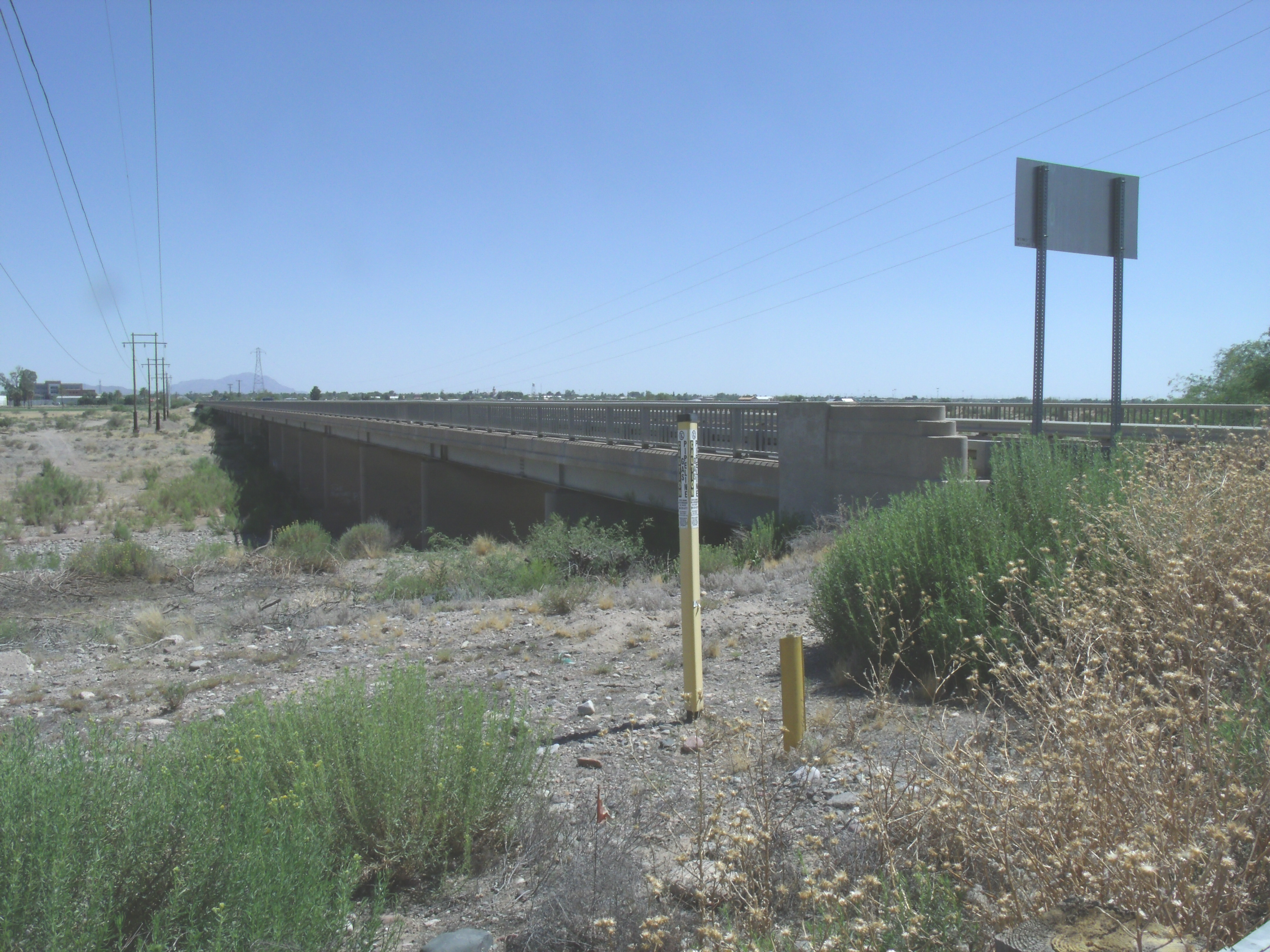
Bridge in Florence, Az. over the Gila River.

=== Monuments and memorials ===
The images in this section are of the following:

- Entrance of the historic Florence Cemetery located at Salazar Road just south of Highway 79.
- The tombstone of Josephus "Joe" Phy, located in the Florence Cemetery at Salazar Road. Phy died in the Tunnel Saloon Gabriel-Phy shootout of 1888. The inscription on the tombstone reads:

In Memory of Josephus Phy Born May 22, 1844; Died June 1, 1888. Farewell dear brother we mourn your loss

- The "Pyramid Tomb" of Charles Debrille Poston, known as The Father of Arizona, due to his efforts lobbying for creation of the territory. Poston was also Arizona Territory's first Delegate to the U.S. House of Representatives. The tomb is located on Primrose Hill, renamed Poston Butte.
- The Tom Mix Monument, located in Arizona highway 79 about 20 miles from Florence, Az. where Tom Mix, a megastar of the silent film industry, died in 1940. The inscription reads as follows:

Jan. 6, 1880 – Oct. 12, 1940.

In Memory of Tom Mix
Whose spirit left his body on this spot, and whose characterization and portrayals in life served to better fix memories of the Old West in the minds of living men

Monuments and memorials

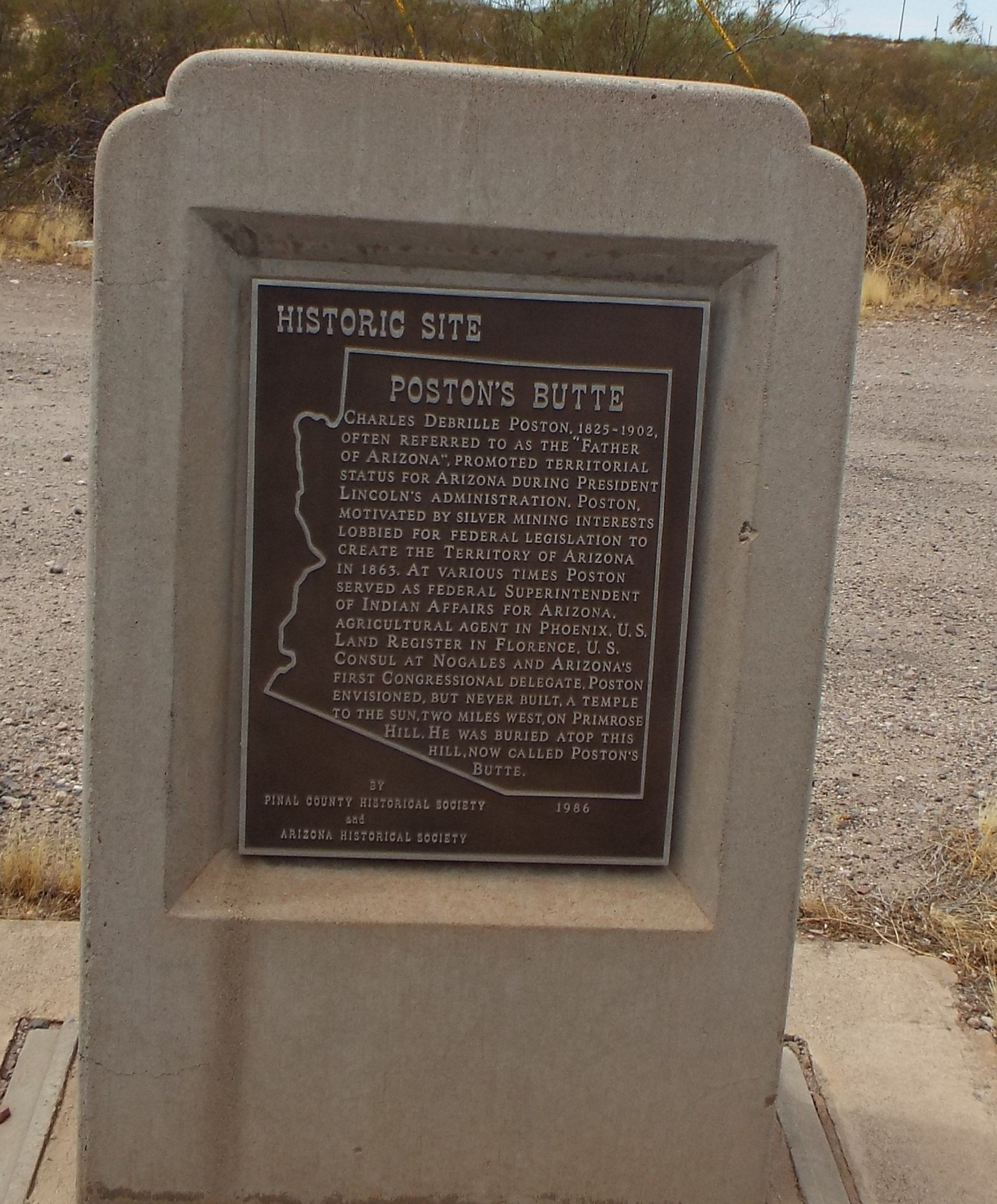
Poston's Butte Marker

(National Register of Historic Places)
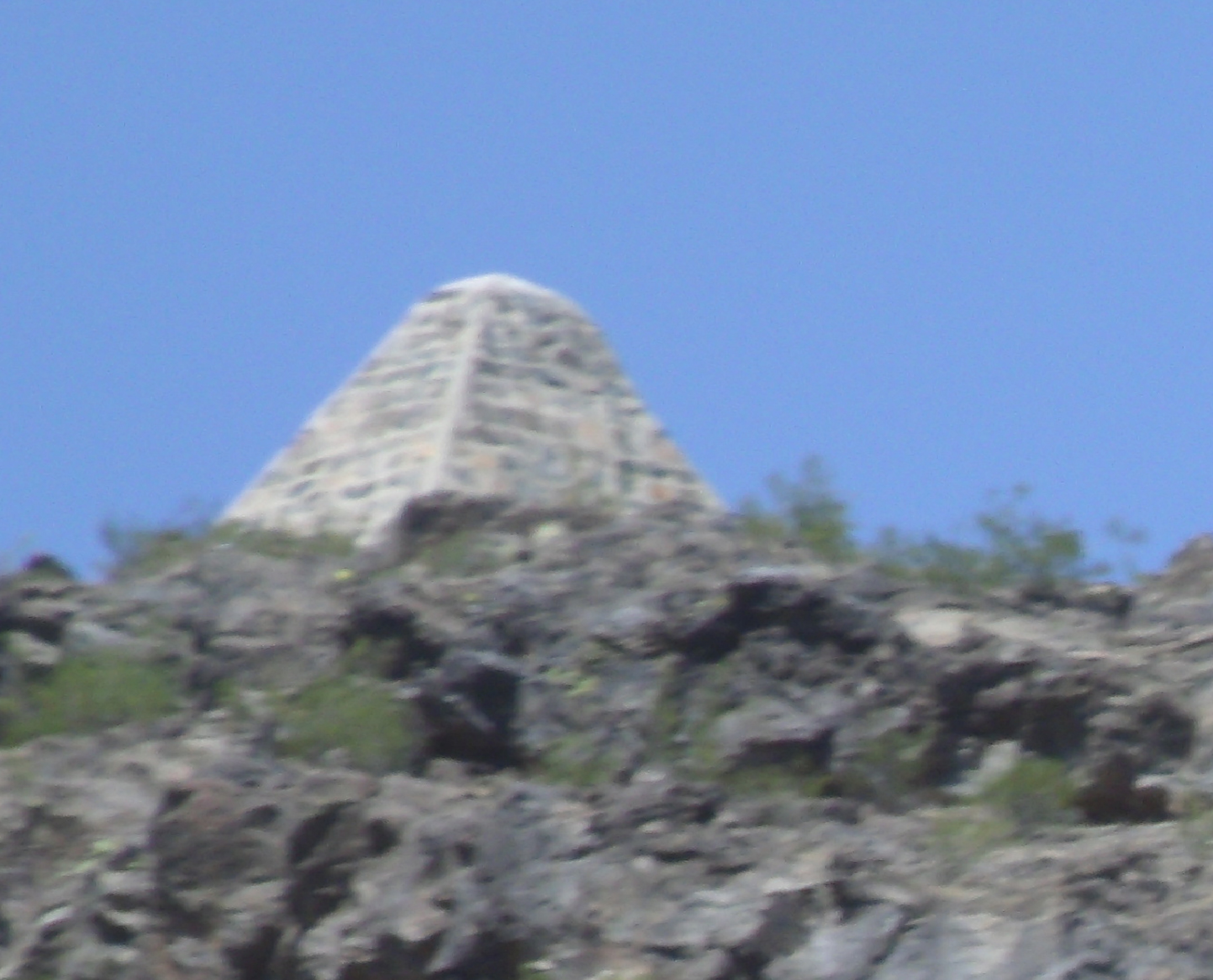
The Pyramid Tomb of Charles Debrille Poston, known as The Father of Arizona.

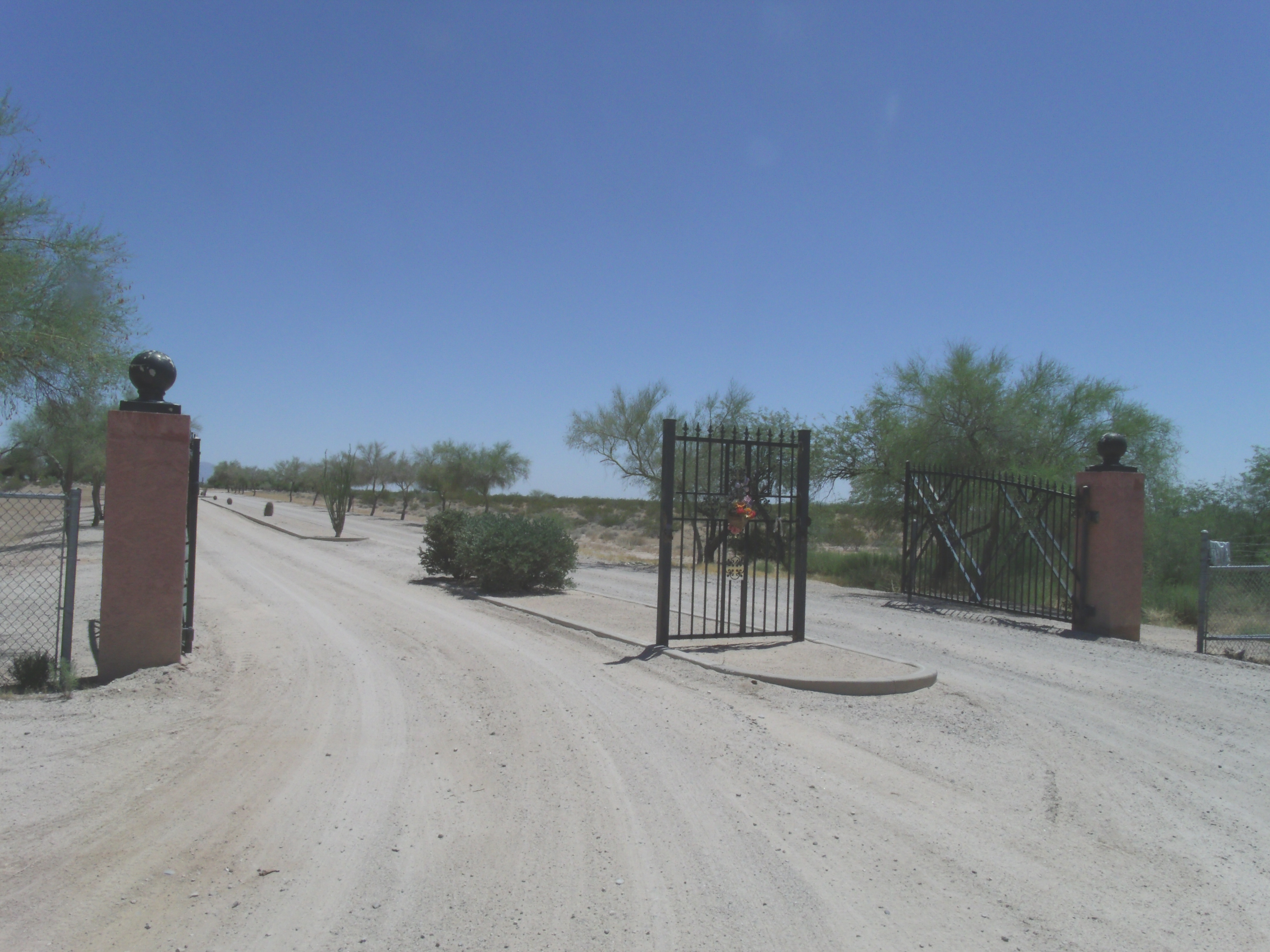
Entrance of the Florence Cemetery.

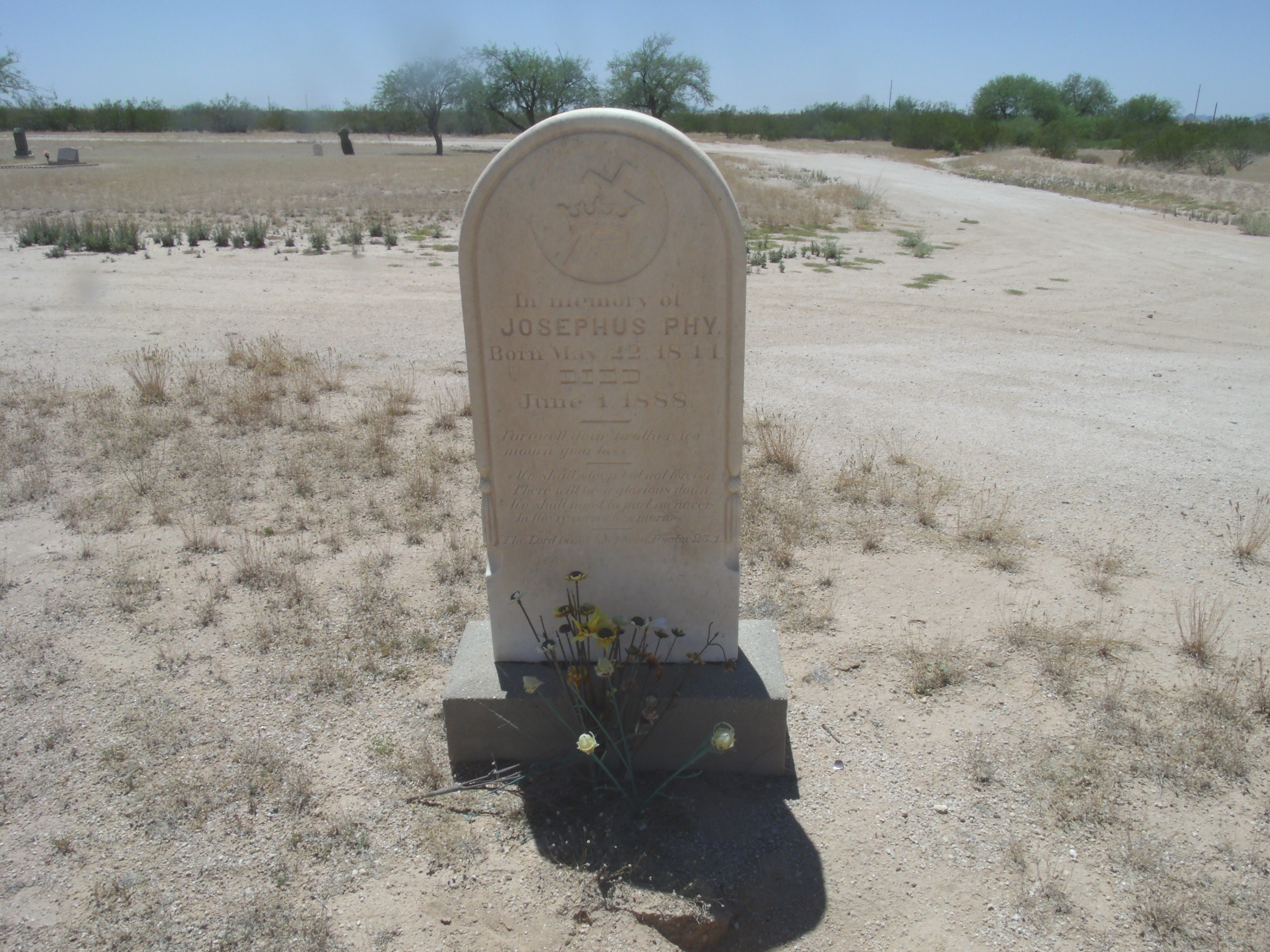
The Tombstone of Josephus “Joe” Phy.

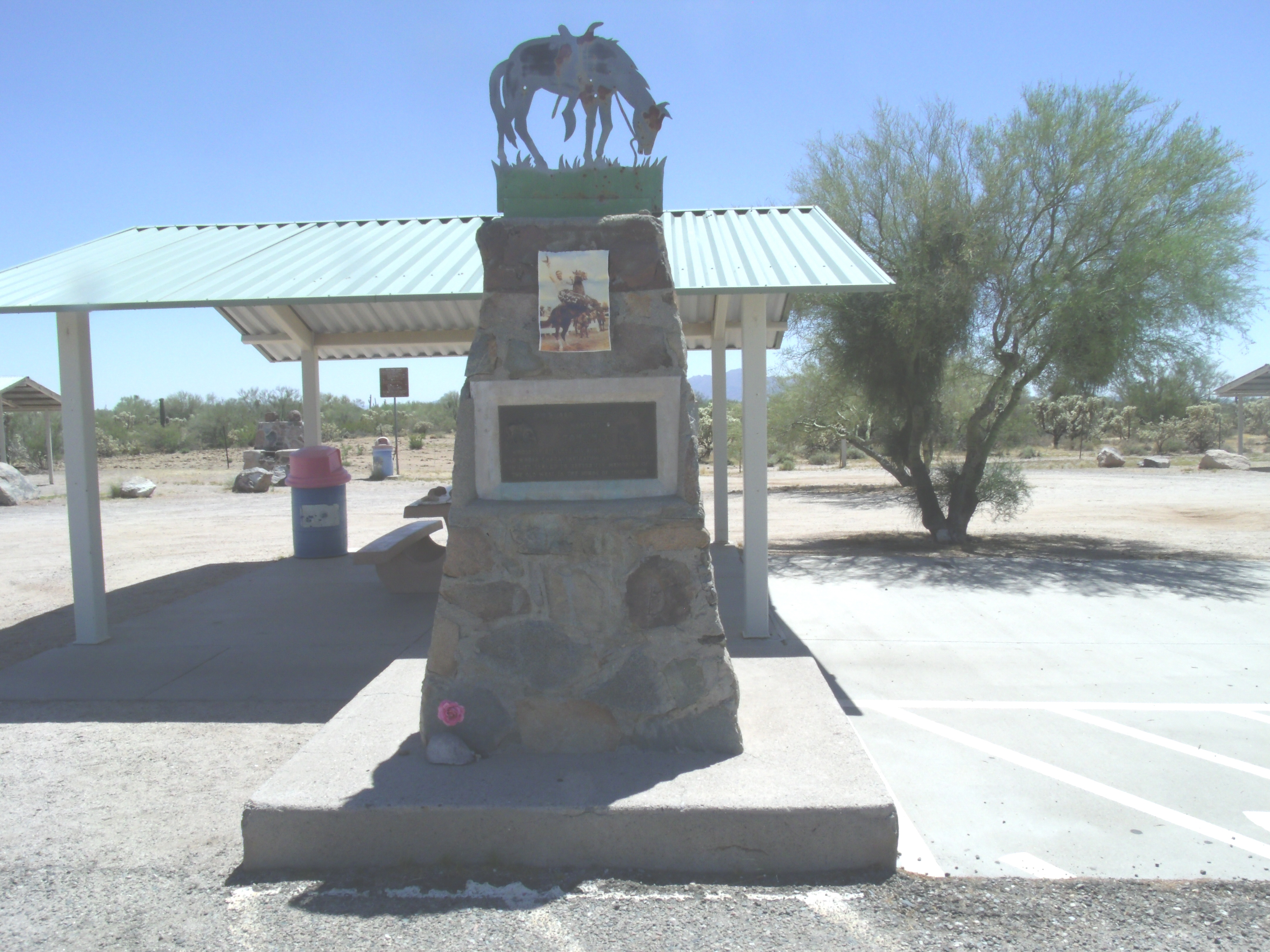
The Tom Mix Monument.

== Pinal County Historic Society & Museum ==
The Pinal County Museum was founded in 1959. The current building where the museum is located was built in 1970 and houses exhibits of early Native-American artifacts, day-to-day early pioneer life in Florence and prison Artifacts.

Pinal County Historic Society & Museum
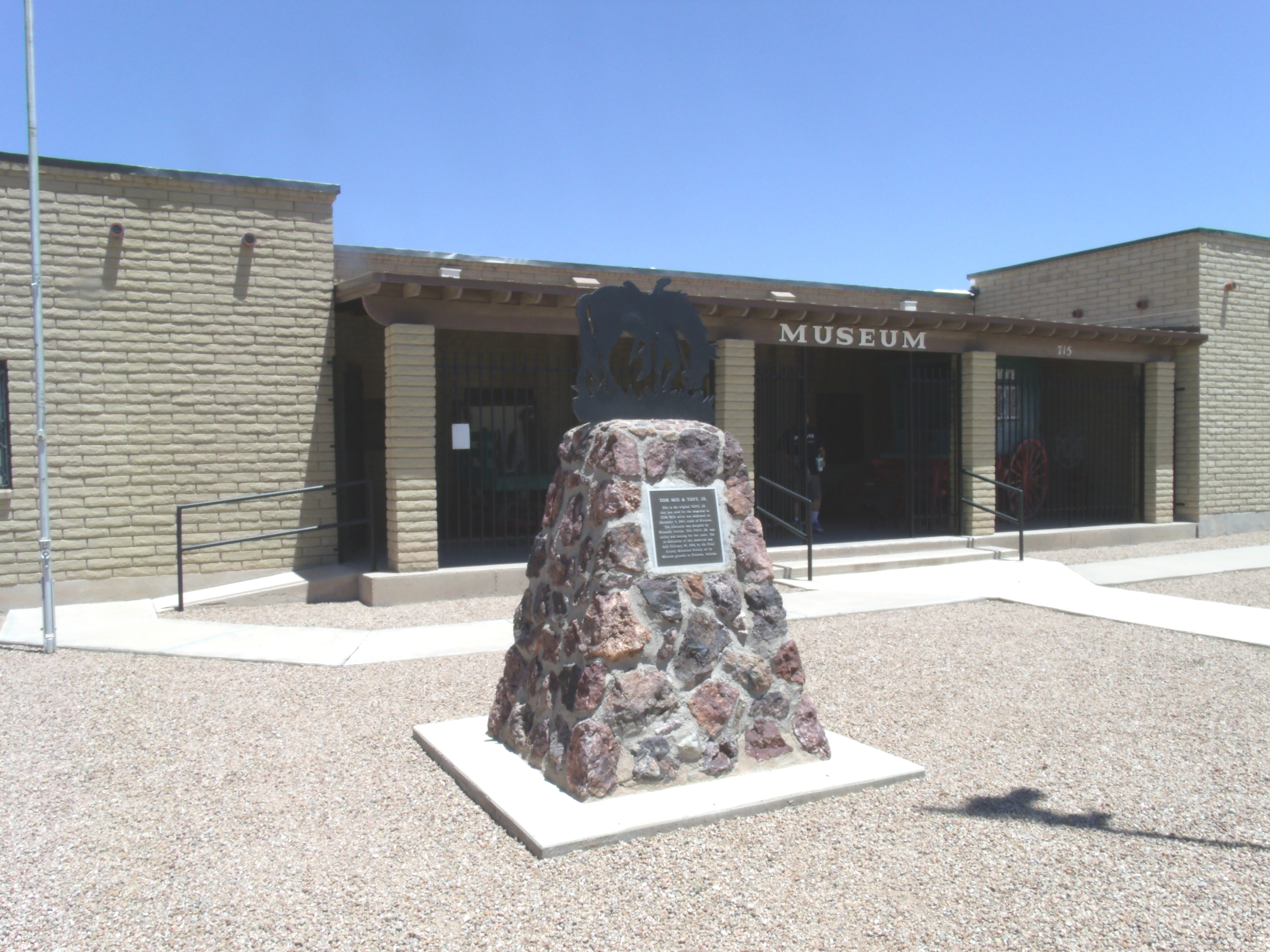
Main entrance of the Pinal County Historic Society & Museum located at 715 S. Main St.

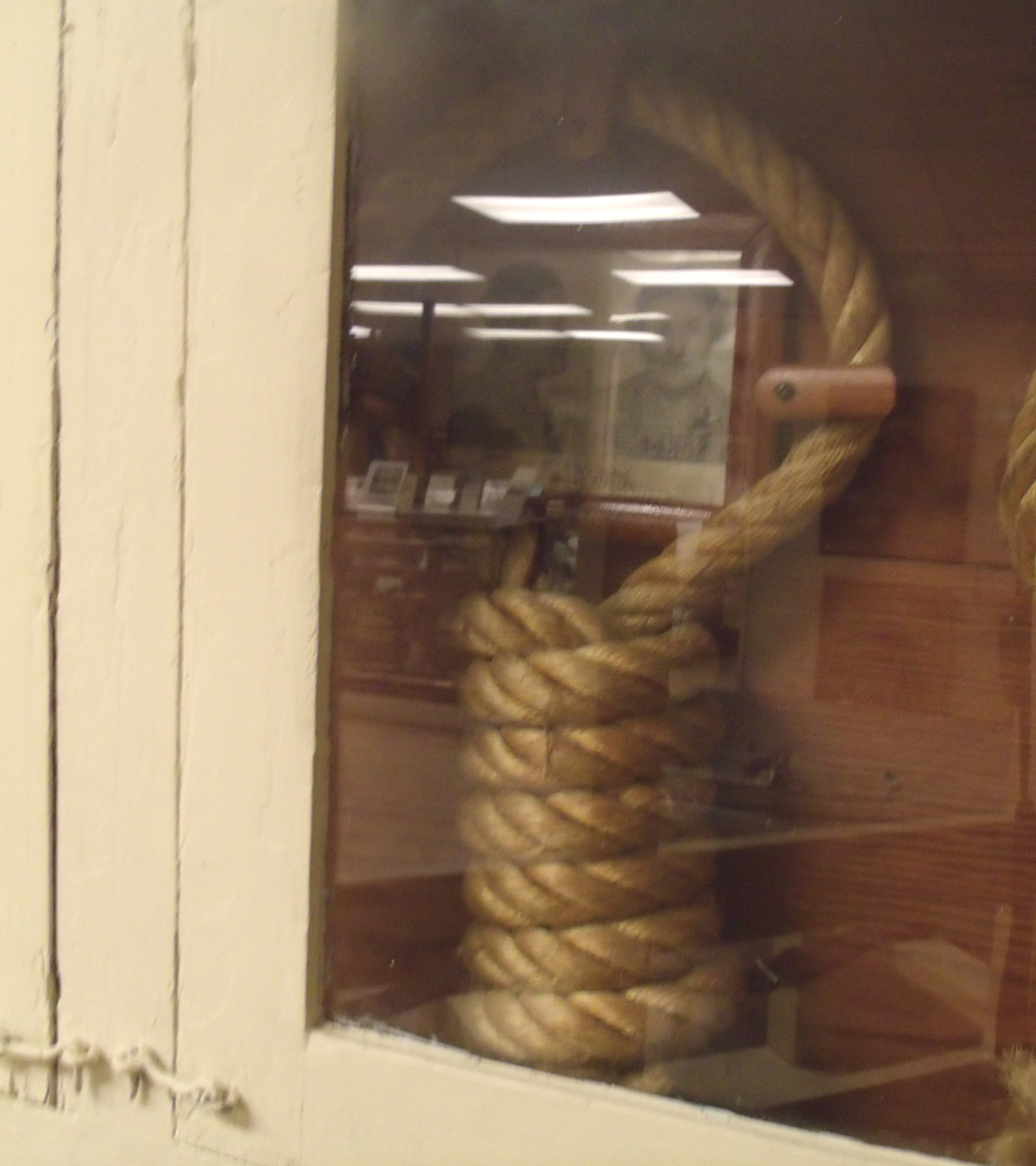
The noose used to hang Eva Dugan on February 21, 1930, on exhibit.

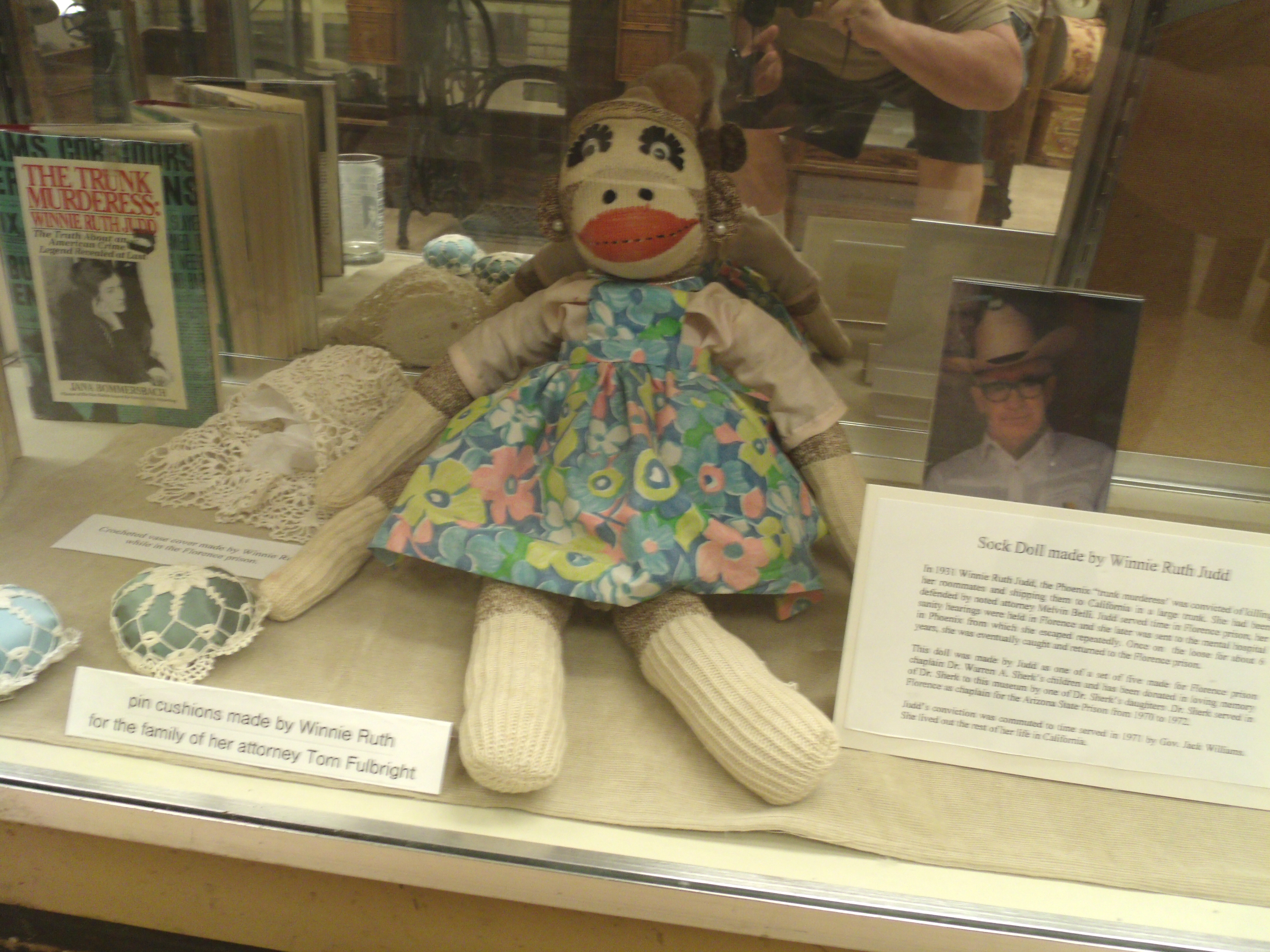
Doll made by Winnie Ruth Judd, the Trunk Murderess, while imprisoned in the Arizona State Prison. It is on display in the Pinal County Historic Society & Museum located at 715 S. Main St. On February 20, 2014, the doll and the story of Judd's crime were featured in an episode of Mysteries at the Museum TV show titled the “Blonde Butcher”.

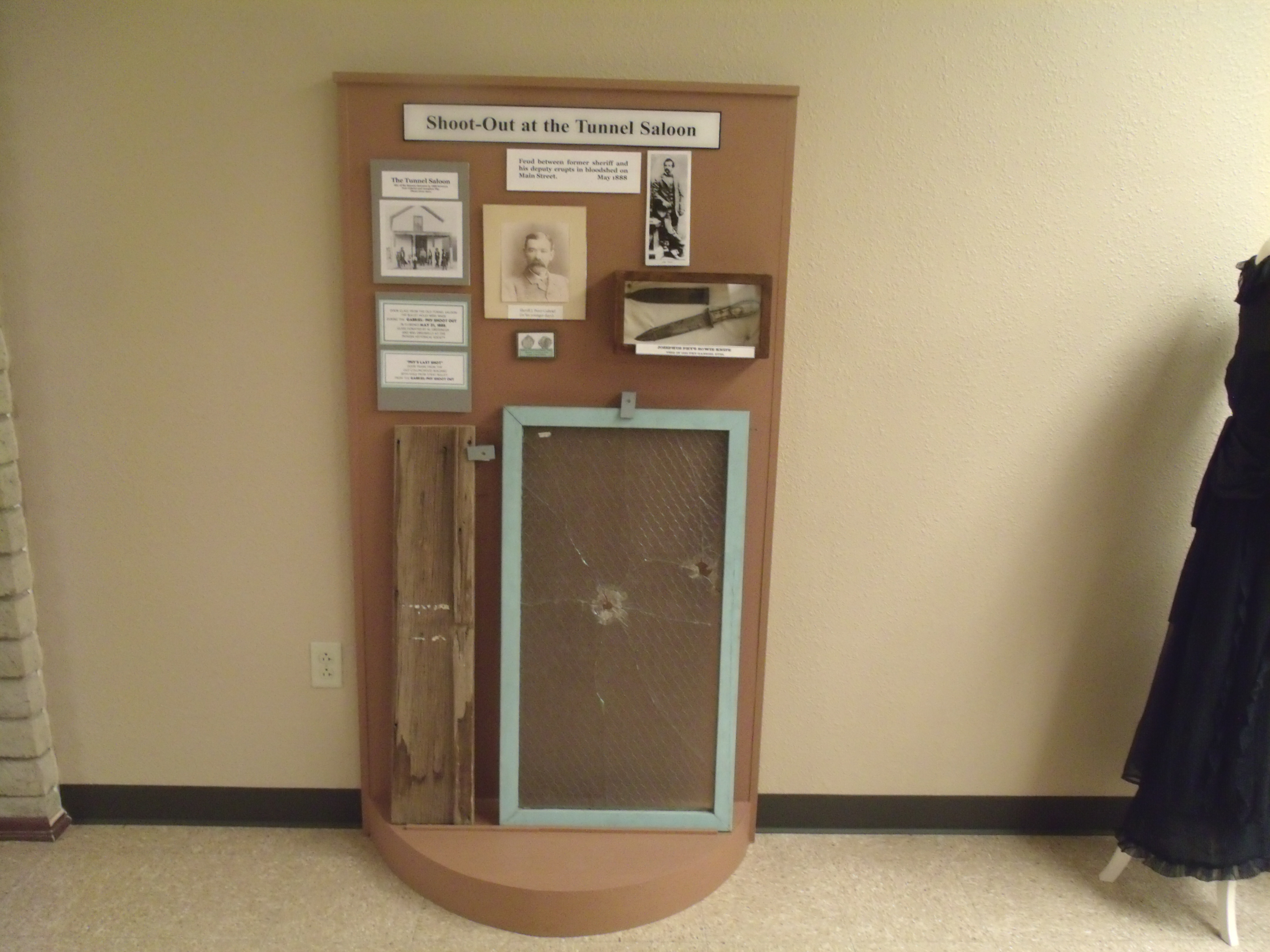
The bullet ridden window pane of the Tunnel Saloon in Florence as a result of the Pete Gabriel – Joe Phy shootout in 1888.

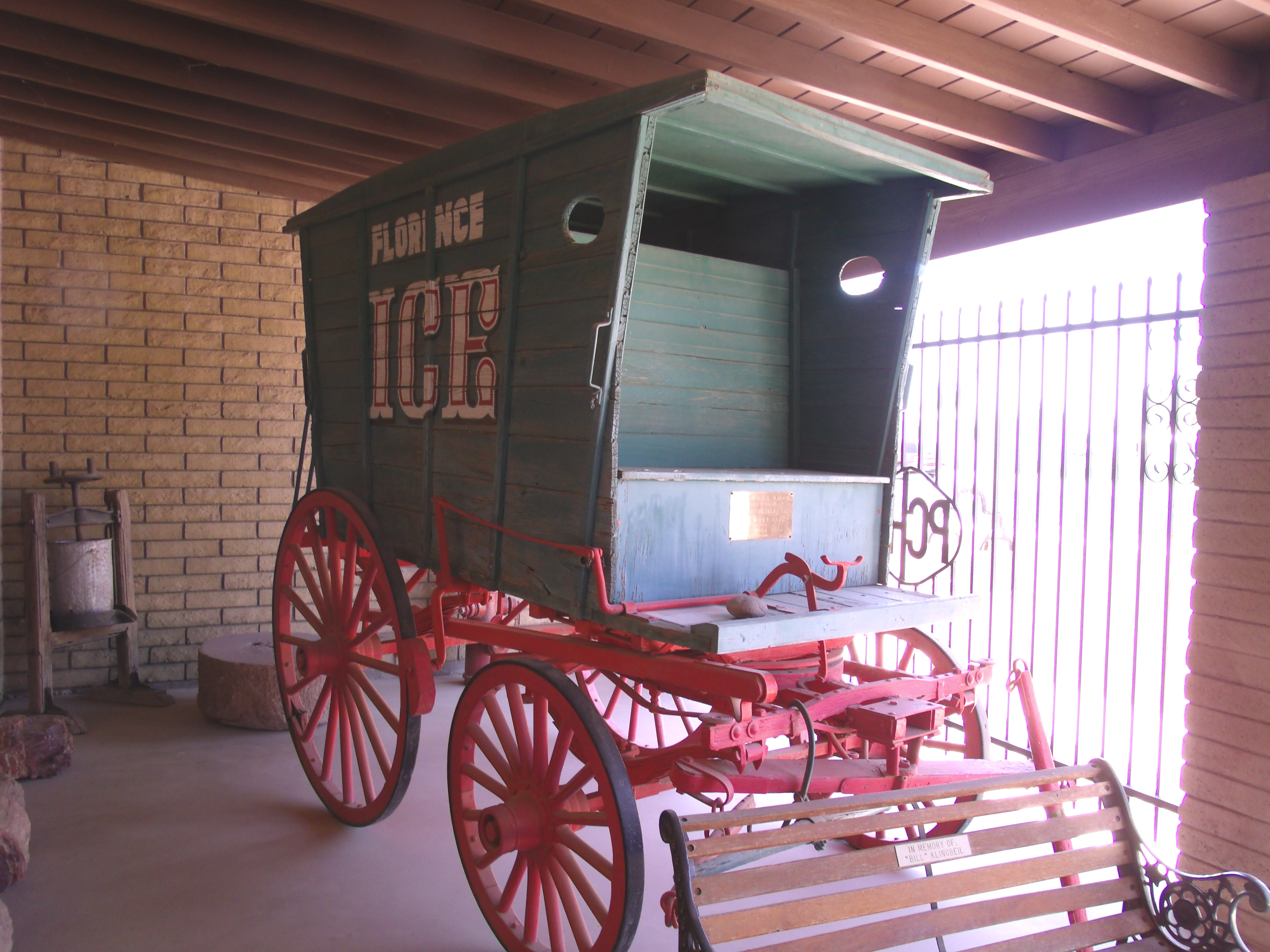
Pinal County Historic Society & Museum located at 715 S. Main St. 1870s Florence Ice Wagon on exhibit.

== Adamsville Ghost Town ==
Adamsville was a farming town founded in 1870 by Fred Adams. The town had stores, homes, a post office and a flour mill and water tanks. In 1900, the Gila River overflowed and wiped out most of the town. Those who survived the flood moved to the town of Florence. The inscription on the marker reads as follows: "In the 1870s, a flour mill and a few stores formed the hub of life in Adamsville, where shootings and knifings were commonplace, and life was one of the cheapest commodities. Most of the adobe houses have been washed away by the flooding Gila River". Listed in the National Register of Historic Places in 1970, reference #10000114.

Adamsville Ghost Town
(National Register of Historic Places)
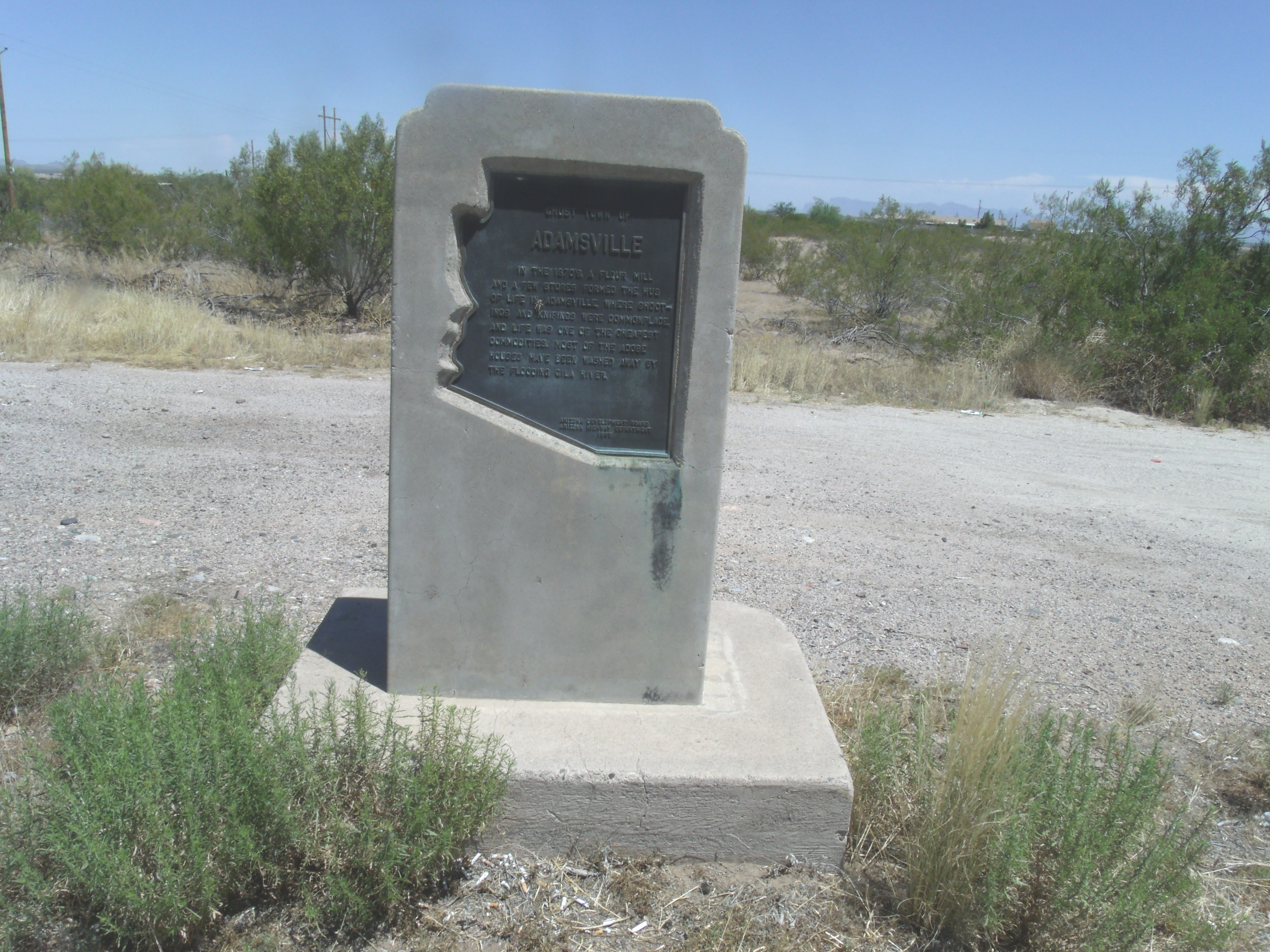
Adamsville Ghost Town Marker.

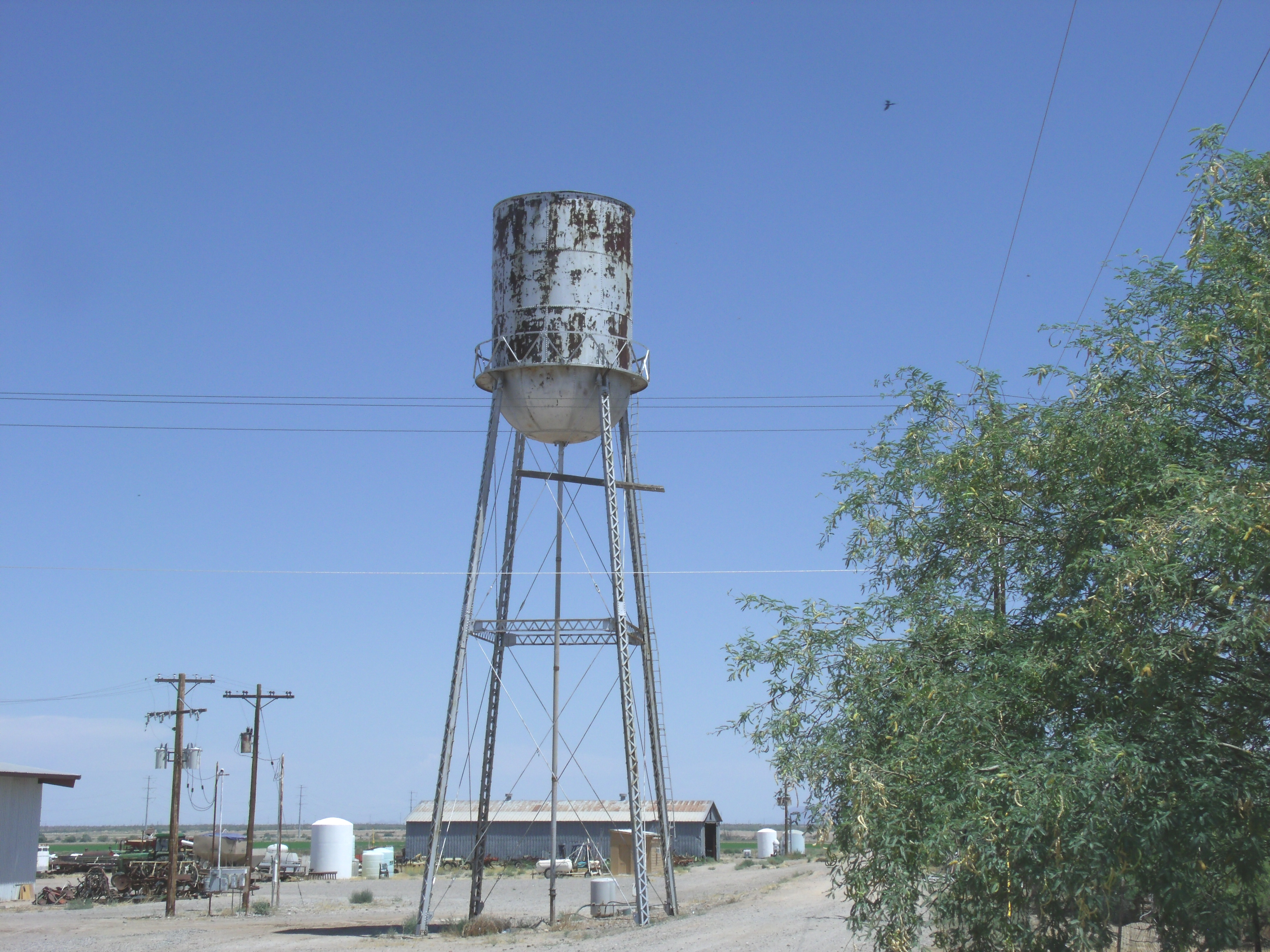
Adamsville Ghost Town Water Tower

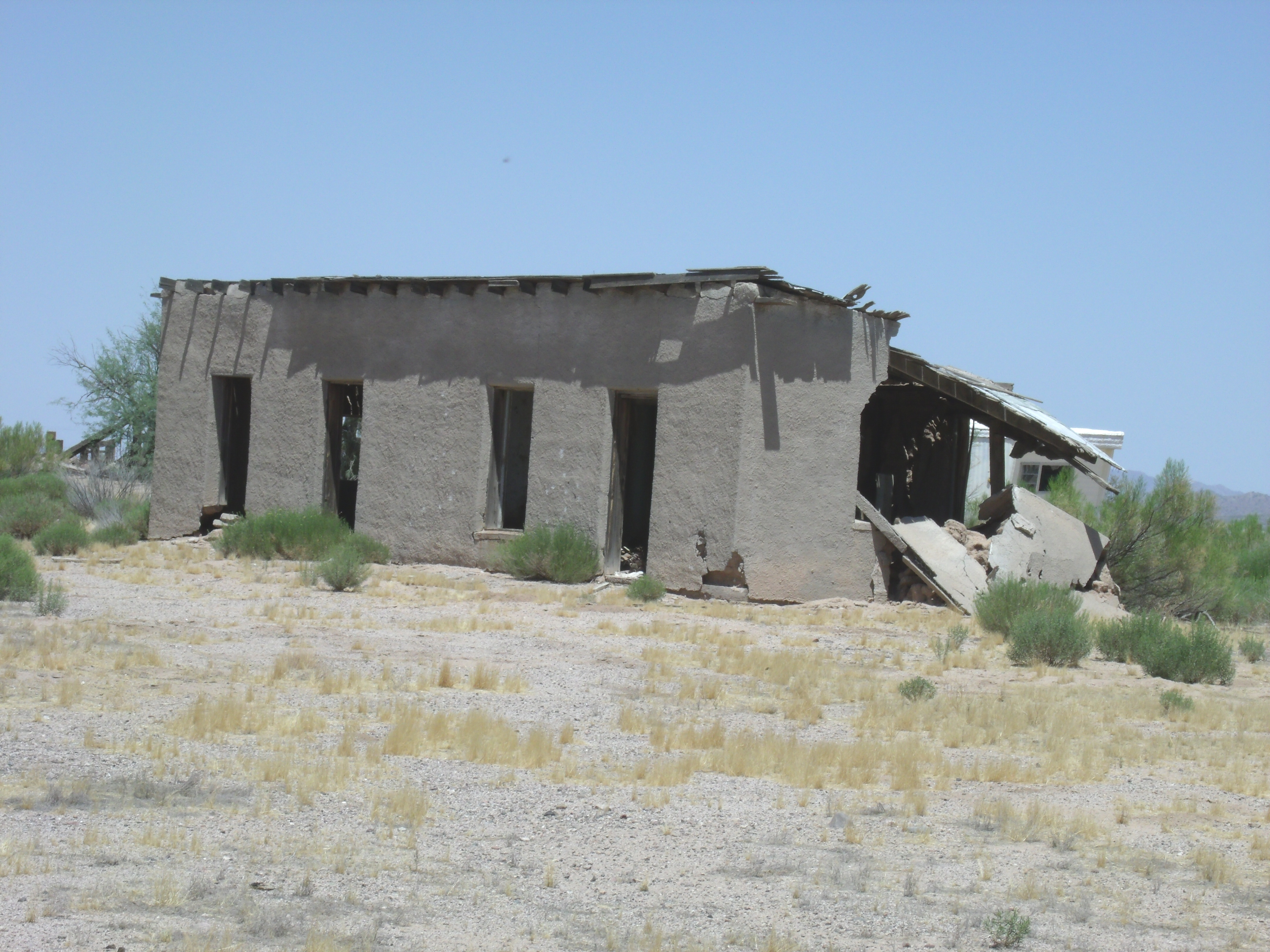
Adamsville Ghost Town store.

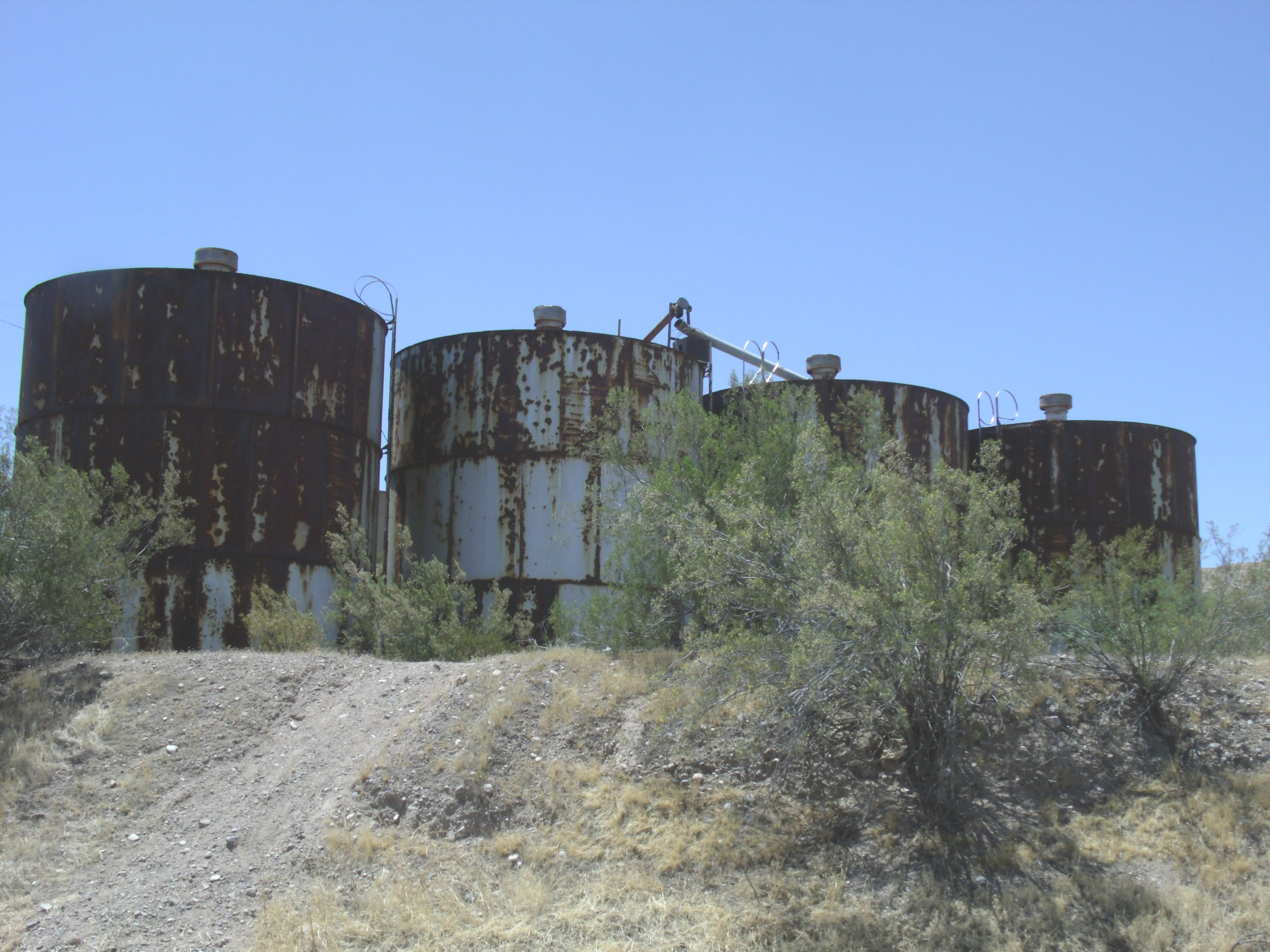
Adamsville Ghost Town Water Tanks. Located on Adamsville Road. Listed in the National Register of Historic Places in 1970, reference #10000114.

== See also ==
- Florence, Arizona
- McFarland State Historic Park
- Poston Butte
- National Register of Historic Places listings in Pinal County, Arizona
