= Arizona State Route 92 =

Former state highway in Arizona, United States

State Route 92
- SR 92 highlighted in red

Route information
- Maintained by ADOT
- Length: 33.91 mi (54.57 km)

Major junctions
- West end: SR 90 near Sierra Vista
- East end: SR 80 in Bisbee

Location
- Country: United States
- State: Arizona

Highway system
- Arizona State Highway System; Interstate; US; State; Scenic Proposed; Former
← US 91	→ SR 93

State Route 92 (SR 92) is a state highway in the U.S. state of Arizona. Running roughly in an L-shaped pattern, SR 92 begins at SR 90 in Sierra Vista and ends at a traffic circle in Bisbee along SR 80, running entirely within Cochise County. The route was constructed and numbered as SR 92 in the late 1930s with a route that traveled further north past Sierra Vista than it does today. The routing was corrected in the 1960s.

== Route description ==
SR 92 begins at an intersection with Fry Boulevard in Sierra Vista. SR 90 is the designation along the roads heading north and east from the intersection. From here, SR 92 heads south through Sierra Vista, passing by residential areas in a desert terrain. The road then passes through the town of Nicksville in Sierra Vista Southeast while the west side of the route is flanked by the Coronado National Forest, in which Huachuca Mountains are located. SR 92 then turns eastward, passing within several miles within the Mexico–United States border. The route passes the towns of Miracle Valley and Palominas before turning northeast. The roadway enters the town of Bisbee, meeting its terminus at a traffic circle in the city.

The highway is maintained by the Arizona Department of Transportation (ADOT), which is responsible for maintaining SR 92 like all other highways around the state. As part of this role, ADOT periodically surveys traffic along its routes. These surveys are most often presented in the form of average annual daily traffic, which is the number of vehicles who use the route on any average day during the year. In 2009, ADOT calculated that around as few as 3,700 vehicles used the route daily near Palominas and as many as 31,000 daily near the northern terminus at Sierra Vista. No part of the highway has been listed in the National Highway System, a system of roads in the United States important to the nation's economy, defense, and mobility.

== History ==
The highway was designated in 1936, originating at SR 82 in Whetstone and heading south into Sierra Vista. From there, it turned east for a stretch and then turned south following its current route to Bisbee. At this time, the section of the route corresponding to the current routing was paved, while the northern section was still a gravel road. The northern section was improved in 1942. In 1961, SR 90 took over the segment of SR 92 north of Sierra Vista, leaving SR 92 to the section south of the city and east to Bisbee. Since then, the routing has not been modified.

== Junction list ==
The entire route is in Cochise County.

Location	mi	km	Destinations	Notes
Sierra Vista	0.00	0.00	SR 90 – Benson, Bisbee	
Bisbee	31.18	50.18	Naco Highway - Naco, Naco Border Station	
Bisbee	33.91	54.57	SR 80 / Bisbee Road – Benson, Douglas	Traffic circle
1.000 mi = 1.609 km; 1.000 km = 0.621 mi
