= Sierra Vista Southeast, Arizona =

CDP in Cochise County, Arizona

- CDP
- Location in Cochise County and the state of Arizona

- Location in the United States
- Coordinates: 31°29′18″N 110°13′56″W
- Country: United States
- State: Arizona
- County: Cochise

Area
  - Total: 110.91 sq mi (287.26 km^{2})
  - Land: 110.89 sq mi (287.21 km^{2})
  - Water: 0.019 sq mi (0.05 km^{2})
- Elevation: 4,554 ft (1,388 m)

Population (2020)
  - Total: 14,428
  - Density: 130.1/sq mi (50.24/km^{2})
- Time zone: UTC-7 (MST (no DST))
- FIPS code: 04-66845
- GNIS feature ID: 2408736

Sierra Vista Southeast, often referred to as Hereford or Nicksville, is a census-designated place (CDP) in Cochise County, Arizona, United States. The population was 14,428 at the 2020 census. It includes the neighborhoods Ramsey Canyon, and Sierra Vista Estates within its boundaries.

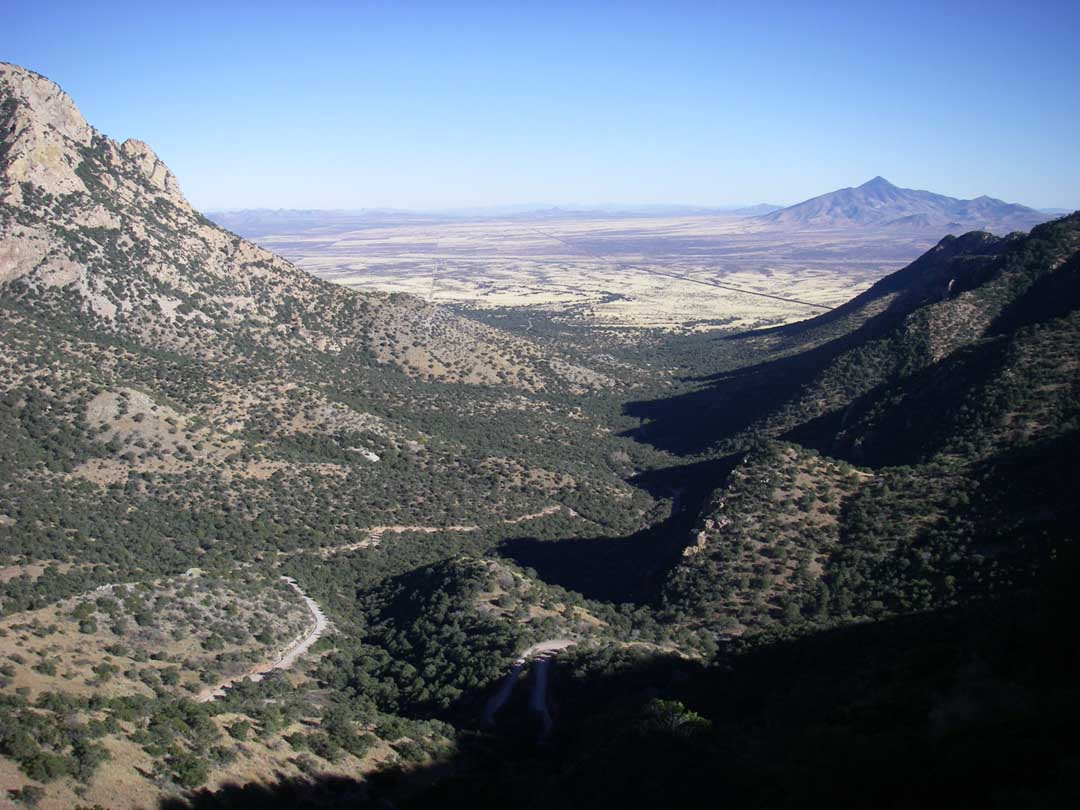
Montezuma Pass at Coronado National Memorial. The United States / Mexican border fence can be seen in the middle of this photograph. Mexico is on the right / south side of the fence.

== Geography ==
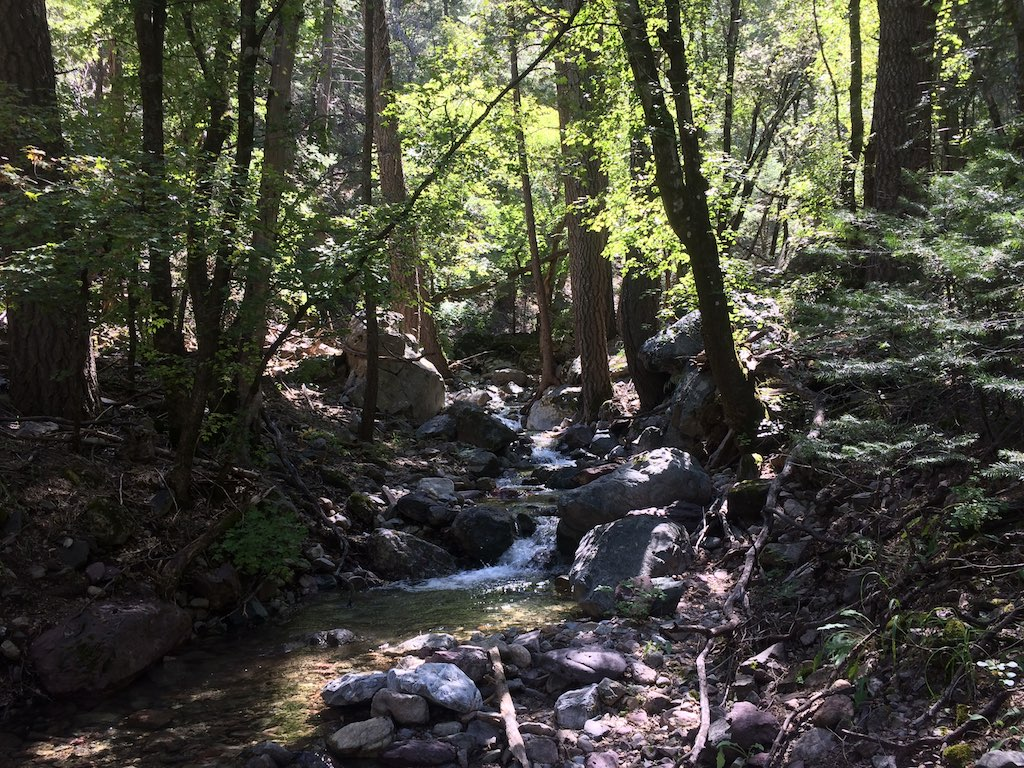
Ramsey Canyon

According to the United States Census Bureau, the CDP has a total area of 110.9 per square mile (42.8/km^{2}), all land. The CDP elevation is fluctuates greatly, but is measured at 4,835 feet (1,474 m) above sea level as measured at the Hereford Post Office. Sierra Vista Southeast includes the Huachuca Mountains and part of the San Pedro River. The highest point in the area is Miller Peak in the Huachuca Mountains at 9,470 feet (2,890 m) above sea level.

Sierra Vista Southeast is 69 miles (111 km) southeast of Tucson and 8.5 miles (13.7 km) north of the United States–Mexico border.

The CDP is built along the San Pedro River, a perennial river. It is the last major undammed desert river in the American Southwest, and it is of major ecological importance as it hosts two-thirds of the avian diversity in the United States, including 100 species of breeding birds and almost 300 species of migrating birds.

Arizona State Route 92 (SR92) runs north to south, connecting the CDP to Sierra Vista and Bisbee.

=== Climate ===
In the Köppen climate classification system, Sierra Vista Southeast falls within the typical cold semi-arid climate (BSk) of mid-altitude Arizona. Fall and spring, like most other parts of Arizona, are very dry. Winters are cool to cold with frosts which can occasionally be hard freezes; frost can be expected to stop in mid- to late April. Spring, like fall, spends about half of itself within the frost season. Summer starts off dry, but progressively gets wetter as the monsoon season approaches. The city has a fairly stable climate with very little humidity. However, the North American Monsoon can bring torrential rains during the months of July and August and will produce almost half the yearly rainfall in just those two months alone. Due to the dry climate the rest of the year and the CDP's high elevation, daily winter low temperatures range from 20 to 30 °F (−6.7 to −1.1 °C) on average and up to 50 °F (10.0 °C) on rare occasions when moist fronts bring warm air from the Gulf of California. Snow is not a common sight in the CDP, though some years the city can receive several inches of snow and other years it will receive none. However, a snow-capped Miller Peak and Carr Peak in the Huachuca Mountains is a common sight for four to five months every year.

Climate data for Hereford, Arizona
| Month | Jan | Feb | Mar | Apr | May | Jun | Jul | Aug | Sep | Oct | Nov | Dec | Year |
|---|---|---|---|---|---|---|---|---|---|---|---|---|---|
| Record high °F (°C) | 80 (27) | 82 (28) | 86 (30) | 99 (37) | 101 (38) | 106 (41) | 104 (40) | 100 (38) | 98 (37) | 93 (34) | 84 (29) | 78 (26) | 106 (41) |
| Mean daily maximum °F (°C) | 58 (14) | 61 (16) | 67 (19) | 75 (24) | 83 (28) | 91 (33) | 89 (32) | 86 (30) | 84 (29) | 75 (24) | 66 (19) | 58 (14) | 74 (23) |
| Mean daily minimum °F (°C) | 33 (1) | 35 (2) | 38 (3) | 44 (7) | 52 (11) | 59 (15) | 63 (17) | 61 (16) | 57 (14) | 49 (9) | 39 (4) | 33 (1) | 47 (8) |
| Record low °F (°C) | 6 (−14) | 1 (−17) | 11 (−12) | 13 (−11) | 27 (−3) | 36 (2) | 48 (9) | 45 (7) | 38 (3) | 19 (−7) | 18 (−8) | 1 (−17) | 1 (−17) |
| Average rainfall inches (mm) | 1.86 (47) | 1.72 (44) | 1.11 (28) | 0.50 (13) | 0.35 (8.9) | 0.72 (18) | 4.61 (117) | 4.65 (118) | 1.97 (50) | 1.58 (40) | 0.99 (25) | 1.94 (49) | 22 (557.9) |
Source: weather.com

== Demographics ==
Historical population
| Census | Pop. | Note | %± |
|---|---|---|---|
| 1990 | 9,237 | | — |
| 2000 | 14,348 | | 55.3% |
| 2010 | 14,797 | | 3.1% |
| 2020 | 14,428 | | −2.5% |

=== 2020 census ===
As of the 2020 census, Sierra Vista Southeast had a population of 14,428. The population density was 130.1 per square mile (50.2/km^{2}). The median age was 52.7 years. 18.3% of residents were under the age of 18 and 29.1% of residents were 65 years of age or older. For every 100 females there were 100.6 males, and for every 100 females age 18 and over there were 99.4 males age 18 and over.

56.0% of residents lived in urban areas, while 44.0% lived in rural areas. Of the total population, 6.9% was foreign born.

There were 5,948 households in Sierra Vista Southeast, of which 21.7% had children under the age of 18 living in them. Of all households, 58.9% were married-couple households, 16.6% were households with a male householder and no spouse or partner present, and 19.4% were households with a female householder and no spouse or partner present. About 25.0% of all households were made up of individuals and 13.2% had someone living alone who was 65 years of age or older. The average family size was 2.99.

There were 6,523 housing units, of which 8.8% were vacant. The homeowner vacancy rate was 2.0% and the rental vacancy rate was 8.8%.

Racial composition as of the 2020 census
| Race | Number | Percent |
|---|---|---|
| White | 11,264 | 78.1% |
| Black or African American | 216 | 1.5% |
| American Indian and Alaska Native | 164 | 1.1% |
| Asian | 202 | 1.4% |
| Native Hawaiian and Other Pacific Islander | 24 | 0.2% |
| Some other race | 722 | 5.0% |
| Two or more races | 1,836 | 12.7% |
| Hispanic or Latino (of any race) | 2,694 | 18.7% |

=== Income and poverty ===
The median income for a household in the CDP was $70,958, the median income for Nonfamily households is $47,753, the median income for families was $94,846 and Married-couple families was $110,485. The per capita income for the CDP was $20,702. About 10% of the population were below the poverty line, including 16.3% of those under age 18 and 4.4% of those age 65 or over.

=== Veterans ===
According to the 2020 Census, 24.1% of the CDP were Veterans of the United States Armed Forces of which 80.3% were male and 19.7% female.

=== Education ===
The education breakout for Sierra Vista Southeast is 21.5% having attained a high school or equivalent degree, 29.1% having some college, but no degree, 11.8% attaining an Associate's degree, 19.1% reaching a Bachelor's degree, and 14.6% attaining a Graduate or Professional Degree.

== Transportation ==
Cochice Connection provides bus connections between Douglas, Bisbee, and Sierra Vista, with a stop in Nicksville.
