= Arizona State Route 80 =

State highway in Arizona, United States

State Route 80
- SR 80 highlighted in red

Route information
- Maintained by ADOT
- Length: 120.20 mi (193.44 km)
- Existed: December 15, 1989–present
- History: The entire route is a former section of US 80
- Tourist routes: Historic US 80

Major junctions
- West end: BL 10 near Benson
- SR 82 in Tombstone; SR 90 near Bisbee; SR 92 in Bisbee; US 191 in Douglas
- East end: NM 80 near Rodeo

Location
- Country: United States
- State: Arizona
- Counties: Cochise

Highway system
- Arizona State Highway System; Interstate; US; State; Scenic Proposed; Former
← US 80	→ SR 81

State Route 80 (SR 80) is a 120.20-mile (193.44-kilometre) long, roughly arc-shaped highway lying in southeastern Arizona. Starting in downtown Benson, the highway serves as the main route through the towns of St. David, Tombstone, Bisbee and Douglas before terminating at the New Mexico state line, becoming New Mexico State Road 80 (NM 80). SR 80 also acts as the national southern terminus of US 191 near Douglas and provides the only connection between the U.S. Highway and its business route in Douglas.

Both SR 80 and NM 80 were once part of U.S. Route 80, which traveled through Arizona between San Diego, California and Savannah, Georgia, starting in 1926. The US 80 designation was retired from this route in 1989 after being made redundant by Interstate 10. Despite being replaced by the Interstate, this segment of old US 80 was not closely paralleled by or reconstructed into I-10, as the Interstate was constructed further north and instead supplants the shorter former route of SR 86 and NM 14.

== Route description ==
State Route 80 (SR 80) begins at an intersection with I-10 Business (4th Street) in Benson near an Amtrak station. The route heads south until it exits the city limit of Benson, where it turns slightly southeast, parallelling the San Pedro River through the southern extent of the San Pedro Valley. At the intersection with Apache Powder Road, SR 80 turns eastward, crossing over the San Pedro River and entering St. David as Patton Street. In St. David, SR 80 turns south as Lee Street. South of St. David, SR 80 continues to parallel the San Pedro River until the highway steers southeast, where the river continues due south. from Just north of Tombstone, SR 80 intersects the eastern terminus of SR 82. While SR 82 heads west towards Nogales, SR 80 continues southeast, before entering Tombstone.

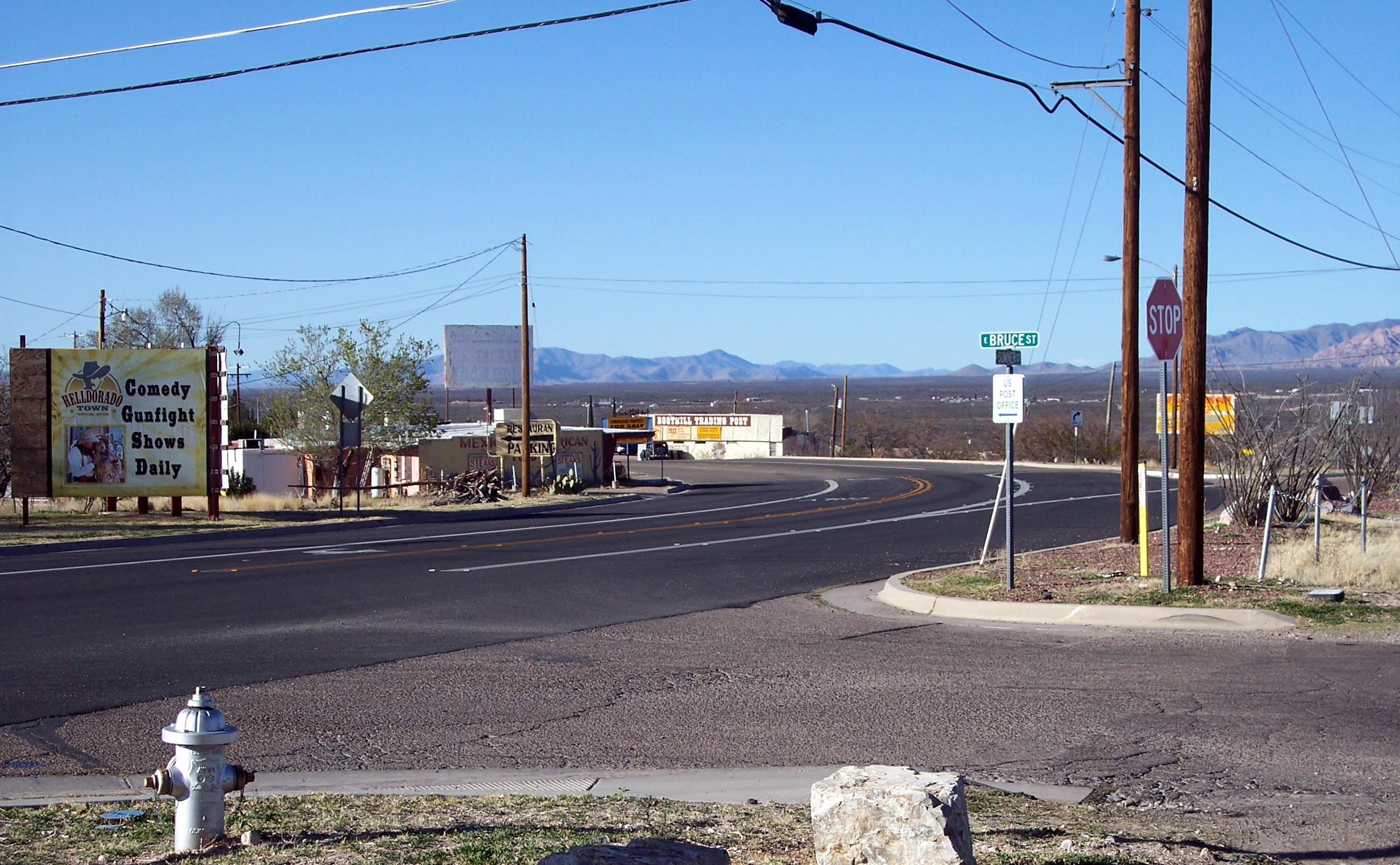
SR 80 in Tombstone seen towards south.

In Tombstone, SR 80 becomes Sumner Street, before curving southeast on Fremont Street through town, past the infamous O.K. Corral. Continuing southeast out of Tombstone, SR 80 curves south just before passing the Tombstone Municipal Airport. The road intersects the eastern terminus of SR 90, which heads west towards Fort Huachuca and Sierra Vista. Past the SR 90 junction, SR 80 proceeds south through the Mule Mountains, where the highway passes through the Mule Pass Tunnel, entering the Bisbee city limits, then skirts around the southern edge of downtown Bisbee. Downtown Bisbee is accessible from SR 80 via two grade-separated interchanges at Tombstone Canyon Road and Main Street. After passing both the inactive Copper Queen Mine and the Lavender Pit, the road meets the eastern terminus of SR 92 at a traffic circle. SR 92 heads southwest towards Sierra Vista, while SR 80 continues east of the traffic circle, past the Warren district of Bisbee. The highway turns southeast at the intersection with Double Adobe Road.

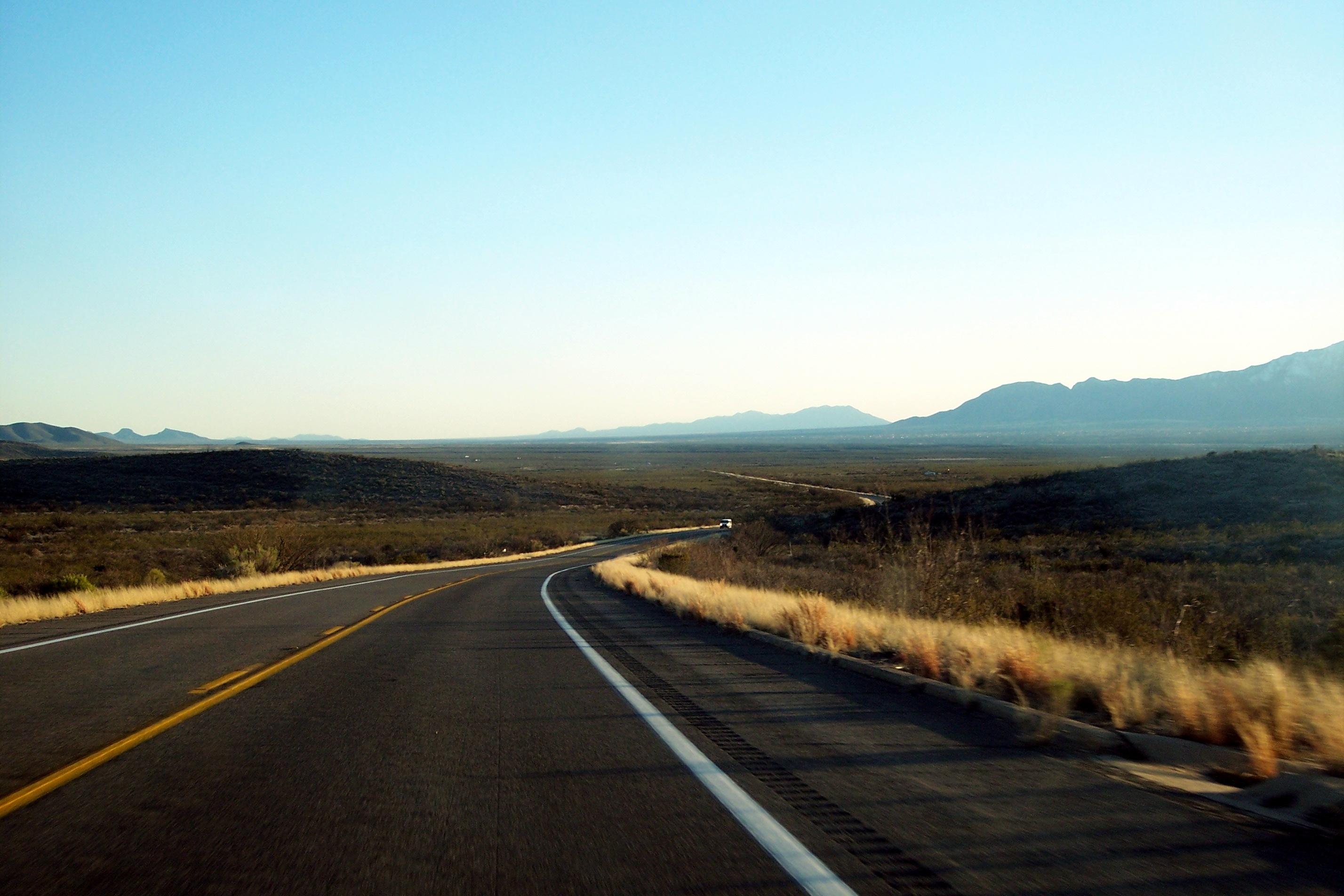
SR 80 between Tombstone and Bisbee, seen towards south.

Southeast of Bisbee, SR 80 approaches the international boundary with Mexico as it nears Douglas. Immediately west of town, SR 80 intersects with the southern terminus of U.S. Route 191, directly north of the old smelter site. Entering town, SR 80 becomes 16th Street, which becomes G Avenue shortly before arriving at an intersection with Pan American Avenue, directly in front of the old railroad station, which currently houses the Douglas Police Department. South of this intersection, Pan American Avenue is designated US 191 Business, which serves the Raul H. Castro Port of Entry between Douglas and Agua Prieta. As US 191 Business does not intersect its parent route, US 191, both routes rely on SR 80 as a direct connection.

SR 80 turns north on Pan American Avenue away from US 191 Business. After a short distance, the route takes a more northeasterly route away from the international boundary, paralleling the abandoned trackbed of the El Paso and Southwestern Railroad. SR 80 heads through the San Bernardino Valley, passing through the small hamlet of Apache, where the Geronimo Surrender Monument is located. Northeast of Apache, the highway crosses the appropriately named State Line Road at the New Mexico state line and becomes New Mexico State Road 80 (NM 80). NM 80 continues through Rodeo towards Interstate 10.

== History ==
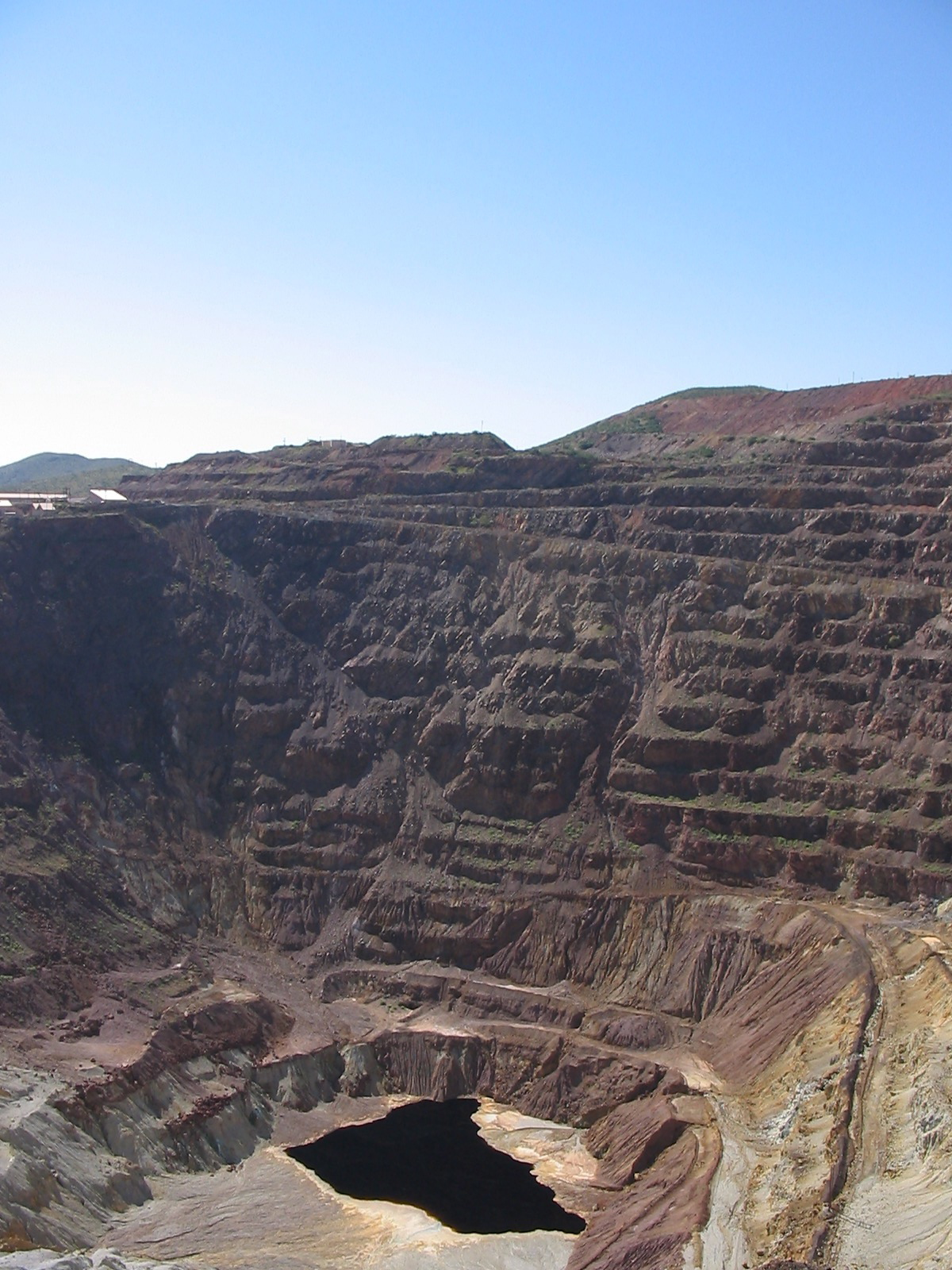
Arizona Route 80 skirts the edge of the Lavender Pit in Bisbee

State Route 80 (SR 80) was originally conceived as part of the proposed state highway system in 1919. On November 11, 1926, it became part of the transcontinental highway U.S. Route 80, which ran between San Diego, California and Savannah, Georgia. The road was paved at this time between Douglas and Bisbee as well as a portion south of Tombstone. The remainder of the highway was a gravel road. By 1931, the highway was paved from Bisbee to the New Mexico state line as well as a portion south of Benson and another portion south of Tombstone. By 1934, the only portion of the highway yet to be paved was a section between Tombstone and Bisbee. The entire route had been paved by 1935.

By 1964, most of the US 80 nationwide was being largely replaced or made redundant by Interstate 8, Interstate 10 and Interstate 20. On July 1, 1964, California decommissioned its entire segment of US 80 between San Diego and Yuma. The state of Arizona followed suit in 1977, decommissioning all of US 80 west of I-10 in Benson. This made Benson the western terminus of US 80. Between Benson and Rodeo, New Mexico, I-10 did not directly replace US 80, as the new interstate was constructed over the heavier traveled and shorter route of former Arizona State Route 86 and New Mexico State Road 14. US 80 remained designated east of Benson until 1989, when US 80 was truncated to the Texas state line in Anthony, New Mexico, removing the designation entirely from within the state of Arizona. All of former US 80 between Fourth Street in Benson and the New Mexico state line was redesignated as SR 80. The remainder of former US 80 between SR 80 and I-10 along Fourth Street is now designated as part of I-10 Business.

On September 21, 2018, most of SR 80 was designated as the Benson to New Mexico segment of Historic U.S. Route 80. The designation was further applied to parts of Allen Street and 6th Street in Tombstone along with Old Divide Road/Tombstone Canyon Road as well as Main Street in Bisbee and G Avenue, 10th Street and A Avenue in Douglas. These other roads were also designated as part of US 80 in previous years, but were bypassed before SR 80 was designated. The I-10 Business Loop in Benson was also designated as part of the Historic Route, as the loop between I-10 and SR 80 was part of US 80 before 1989.

== Junction list ==
The entire route is in Cochise County.

Location	mi	km	Destinations	Notes
Benson	293.35	472.10	BL 10 (4th Street) / Historic US 80 west – Tucson, Willcox	Interchange; western terminus; western end of Historic US 80 concurrency
	313.91	505.19	SR 82 west – Nogales	
	332.88	535.72	SR 90 west – Sierra Vista, Fort Huachuca	
	338.74	545.15	Historic US 80 east (Old Divide Road)	Eastern end of Historic US 80 concurrency
	339.07	545.68	Mule Pass Tunnel	
Bisbee	339.89	547.00	West Boulevard / Tombstone Canyon Road (Historic US 80)	Interchange
Bisbee	341.44	549.49	Old Bisbee (Historic US 80 west)	Interchange; western end of Historic US 80 concurrency
Bisbee	343.29	552.47	SR 92 west / Bisbee Road – Sierra Vista	Traffic circle
Douglas	364.67	586.88	US 191 north – Willcox	Southern terminus of US 191
Douglas	366.12	589.21	US 191 Bus. south (Pan American Avenue south) / Historic US 80 east ("G" Avenue) – Business/Historic District, Mexico	Northern terminus of US 191 Bus.; eastern end of Historic US 80 concurrency
Douglas	368.06	592.34	Historic US 80 west ("A" Avenue) – Business/Historic District	Western end of Historic US 80 concurrency
	415.39	668.51	Historic US 80 ends NM 80 north	Continuation into New Mexico; eastern end of Historic US 80 concurrency
1.000 mi = 1.609 km; 1.000 km = 0.621 mi: Concurrency terminus
