= Arizona State Route 90 =

State highway in Arizona, United States

State Route 90
- SR 90 highlighted in red

Route information
- Maintained by ADOT
- Length: 46.77 mi (75.27 km)
- Existed: 1957–present

Major junctions
- South end: SR 80 near Tombstone
- North end: I-10 in Benson

Location
- Country: United States
- State: Arizona

Highway system
- Arizona State Highway System; Interstate; US; State; Scenic Proposed; Former
← SR 89L	→ US 91

State Route 90 (SR 90) is a highway in Cochise County, Arizona that runs from the I-10 junction at Benson to a junction with State Route 80 between Bisbee and Tombstone. It is a north–south route north of Sierra Vista, and an east–west route east of the city. It passes through the San Pedro Riparian National Conservation Area at milepost 329; the riparian area makes up a large part of the southern section of the San Pedro Valley.

== Route description ==
The northern terminus of SR 90 is located at an interchange with I-10 west in Benson. It heads south from the interchange and provides access to Kartchner Caverns State Park. It continues south from the state park to a junction with SR 82 north of Huachuca City. It continues towards the south, but curves towards the southeast before passing through Huachuca City. SR 90 continues to the southeast passing through the Fort Huachuca Military Reservation and passes near the Sierra Vista Municipal Airport. The highway turns towards the east as it enters Sierra Vista. It continues to the east along the north side of the city before curving towards the south to a junction with SR 92. As SR 92 continues south from the junction, SR 90 turns towards the east. It continues to the east until curving towards the southeast near the overpass over the San Pedro & South Western Railroad line. The highway continues to the southeast to its eastern terminus at a junction with SR 80 between Tombstone and Bisbee.

== History ==
The highway was designated in 1936, but constructed in the 1940s, and originally covered the route from Sierra Vista to US 80 near Bisbee. In 1961, the road was extended north, overtaking State Route 92's path to Whetstone and continuing north to Benson, providing easier access to Sierra Vista and Fort Huachuca from the north. This segment was widened to four lanes in the 1990s.

== Junction list ==
The entire route is in Cochise County.

Location	mi	km	Destinations	Notes
Benson	289.25	465.50	I-10 – Tucson, El Paso	Western terminus; I-10 exit 302
Whetstone	308.39	496.31	SR 82 – Tombstone, Nogales	
Sierra Vista	317.20	510.48	SR 90 Spur – Business District, Fort Huachuca (Van Deman Gate, Visitors & Commercial Vehicles), Buffalo Soldier Gate	
Sierra Vista	321.52	517.44	SR 92 – Palominas	
	336.40	541.38	SR 80 – Benson, Tombstone, Bisbee, Douglas	Eastern terminus
1.000 mi = 1.609 km; 1.000 km = 0.621 mi

== Spur Route ==
SR 90 has a spur route, logged as two separate sections and located entirely within the city of Sierra Vista. Both sections of the spur are less than 0.5 miles (0.80 kilometres) and are located near Fort Huachuca.

=== East leg ===
State Route 90 Spur (1)
- Location: Sierra Vista
- Length: 0.12 mi (190 m)
- Existed: 1974–present

State Spur Route 90 (1) (SR 90 Spur) is a 0.12-mile (0.19 km) long spur route of SR 90. The route begins immediately south of SR 90 on Buffalo Soldier Trail. The spur travels north along Buffalo Soldier Trail to a traffic light with SR 90 and the second SR 90 Spur. The second spur begins at the western end of the intersection. The remainder of Buffalo Soldier trail acts as the western edge of Sierra Vista. The road also provides a direct connection to SR 92 and can be used as a bypass of downtown Sierra Vista by SR 90 traffic headed to SR 92. All of SR 90 Spur is unsigned.

=== West leg ===
State Route 90 Spur (2)
- Location: Sierra Vista
- Length: 0.30 mi (480 m)
- Existed: 1974–present

State Spur Route 90 (2) (SR 90 Spur) is a 0.30-mile (0.48 km) long spur route of SR 90. The route starts close to a checkpoint at the eastern gate of Fort Huachuca. The roadway continues west of here as Hatfield Street, which is the main thoroughfare within the fort. SR 90 Spur heads east along the remainder of Hatfield Street to a traffic-controlled intersection with SR 90 and the first SR 90 Spur. The roadway continues east as SR 90 proper. The second spur begins on the south end of the intersection. On some satellite photographs, the spot where ADOT maintenance of Hatfield Street begins can easily be seen where the road has a sudden change in the pavement. The entire route is unsigned.

=== Major intersections ===
The entire route is in Sierra Vista, Cochise County.

mi	km	Destinations	Notes
316.88	509.97	Fort Huachuca East Gate	Western terminus of SR 90 Spur; road continues into Ft. Huachuca as Hatfield Street
317.18	510.45	SR 90 to I-10	
317.29	510.63	Buffalo Soldier Trail south	Continuation beyond eastern terminus of SR 90 Spur
1.000 mi = 1.609 km; 1.000 km = 0.621 mi
