= Arizona State Route 82 =

State highway in Santa Cruz and Cochise counties in Arizona, United States

State Route 82
- SR 82 highlighted in red

Route information
- Maintained by ADOT
- Length: 65.74 mi (105.80 km)
- Tourist routes: Patagonia–Sonoita Scenic Road

Major junctions
- West end: BL 19 in Nogales
- East end: SR 80 near Tombstone

Location
- Country: United States
- State: Arizona

Highway system
- Arizona State Highway System; Interstate; US; State; Scenic Proposed; Former
← SR 81	→ SR 83

State Route 82 (SR 82) is an east–west state highway in southern Arizona. The western terminus of Route 82 is located at its junction with Business Loop 19 (Grand Avenue) in Nogales and its eastern terminus at its junction with State Route 80 just north of Tombstone. Between Nogales and Patagonia, it is also known as Patagonia Road and Patagonia Highway. Other than the aforementioned locations, Route 82 also travels through Sonoita and Whetstone, and is one of the few major east–west highways in its service area.

== Route description ==
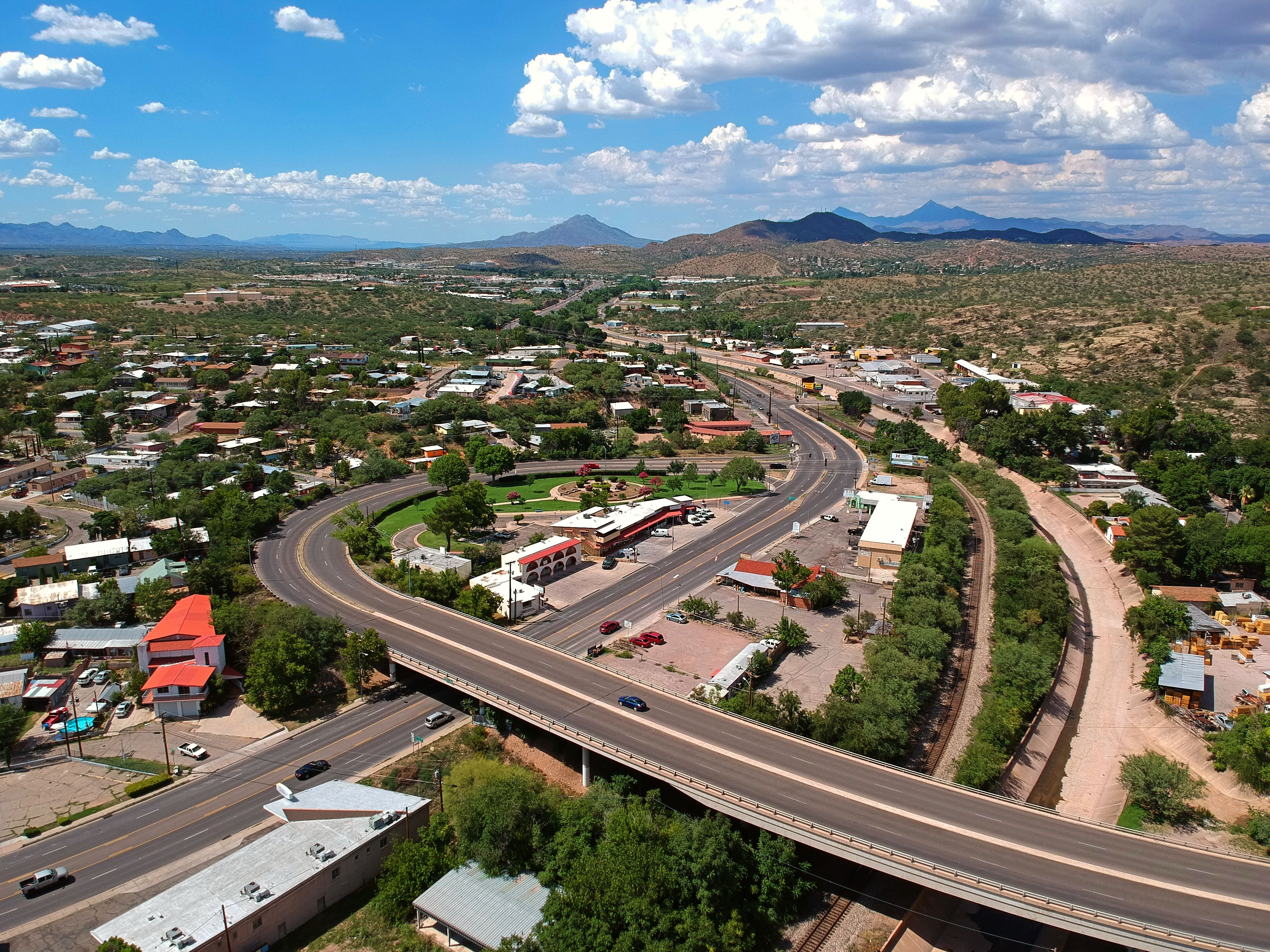
The western terminus of Arizona State Route 82 (Patagonia Highway) in Nogales. SR 82 crosses over Grand Avenue, the Union Pacific Railroad, and the Nogales Wash a half mile from its western end.

State Route 82 (SR 82) begins as a semicircular ramp branching from the west side of State Business Route 19 (also known as SR 19 Bus. and Grand Avenue), crossing over the business route and turning northeast. The route runs along Patagonia Highway out of Nogales. Passing several riverbeds, the route skirts the northwest side of Nogales International Airport before turning north. The highway, which provides access to Patagonia Lake State Park, briefly enters Coronado National Forest before turning northeast again and following the Sonoita Creek.

SR 82 passes through the town of Patagonia and heads through a gap between two sections of the Coronado National Forest, following an abandoned rail line. The road meets SR 83 in Sonoita, where it turns east, and intersects SR 90 in Whetstone after entering Cochise County. SR 82 then passes through the San Pedro Riparian National Conservation Area before meeting its eastern terminus at SR 80 northwest of Tombstone.

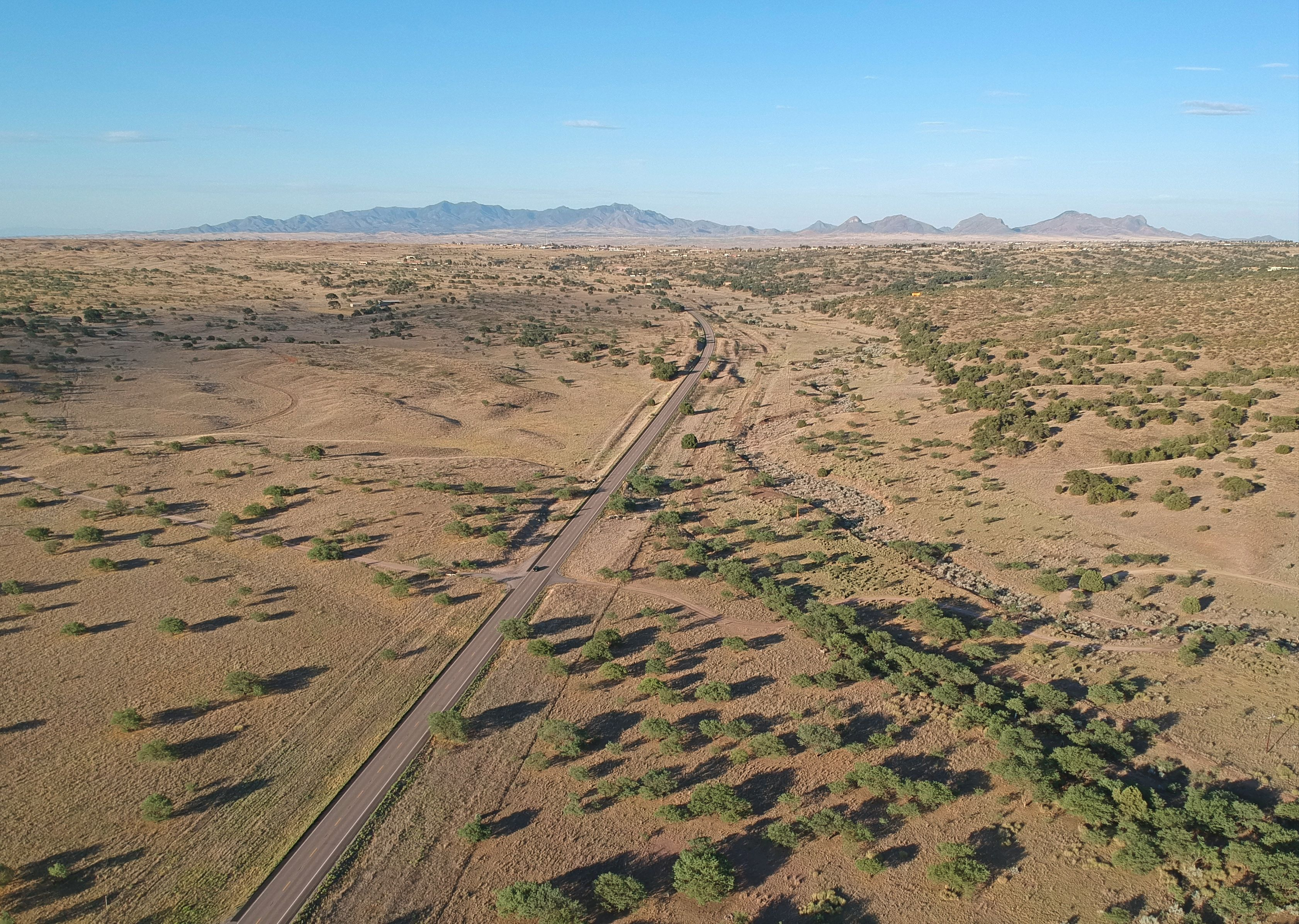
Arizona State Route 82 west of Sonoita. The state highway crosses between the Whetsone and Mustang Mountains in the far distance.

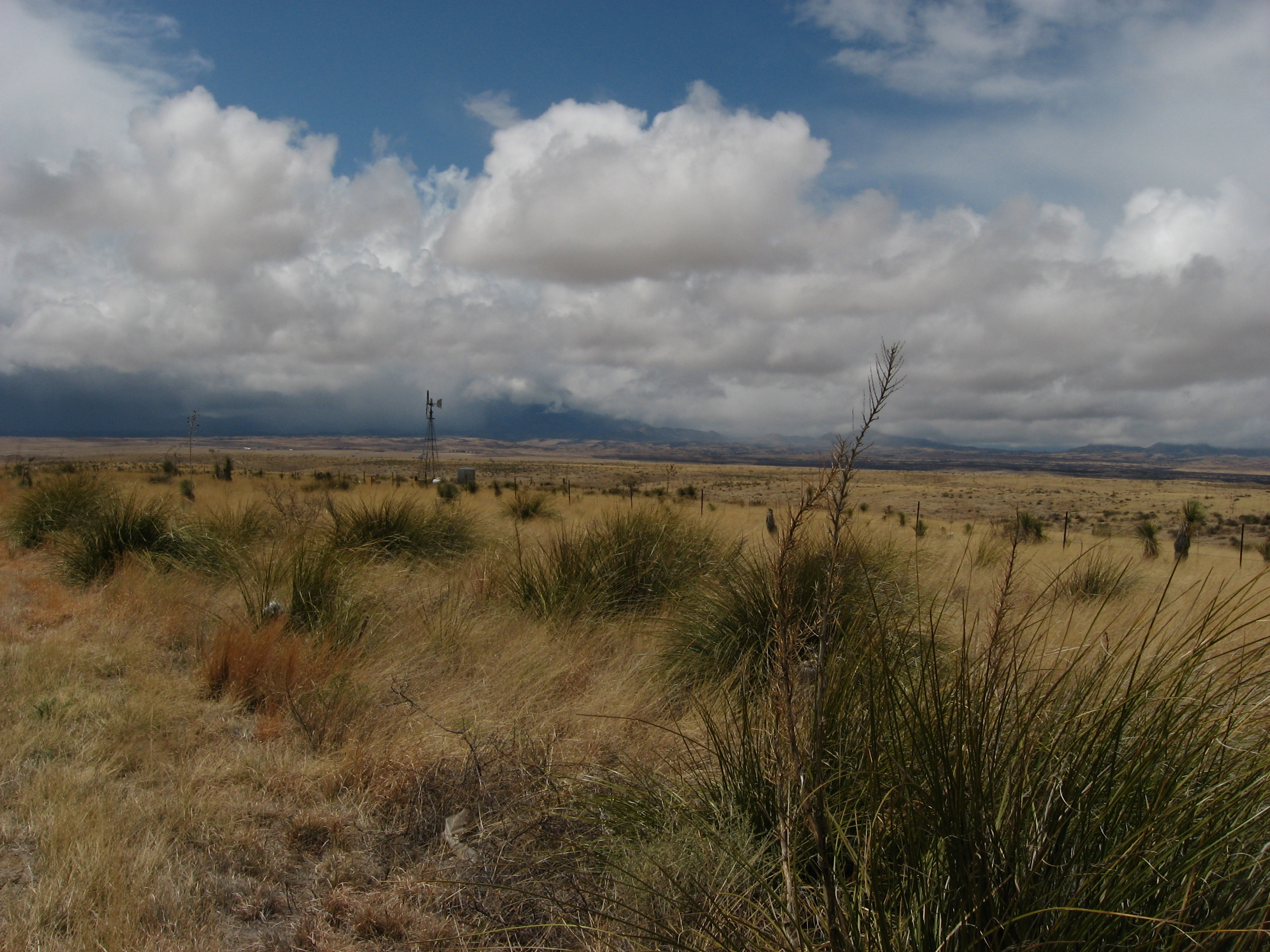
State Route 82 between Sonoita and Tombstone, Arizona

== History ==
The route was established by 1926, where it existed as an unpaved road along its current route. By 1940, the route was paved northeast from Nogales to Patagonia. A section from Whetstone to the eastern terminus was also paved by 1942. The remaining middle portion of the route was paved by 1946.

== Junction list ==
County	Location	mi	km	Destinations	Notes
Santa Cruz	Nogales	0.00	0.00	BL 19 – Tucson, Nogales	Western terminus; serves Southeastern Arizona Behavioral Health Services
Santa Cruz	Nogales	0.39	0.63	Perkins Avenue	Interchange; eastbound entrance only
Santa Cruz	Sonoita	30.61	49.26	SR 83 to I-10 – Parker Canyon Lake	
Cochise	Whetstone	49.84	80.21	SR 90 – Benson, Sierra Vista	
Cochise		65.74	105.80	SR 80 – Benson, Tombstone	Eastern terminus
1.000 mi = 1.609 km; 1.000 km = 0.621 mi: Incomplete access
