= Brake Masters =

Privately held automotive repair chain

Brake Masters, Inc.
- Company type: Privately held corporation
- Industry: Automotive
- Founded: February 1982
- Headquarters: Tucson, Arizona, United States
- Area served: Southwestern United States
- Key people: Eric Laytin; Shalom Laytin Richard Fortuno - Chief Executive Officer Alex Corrales - Chief Operating Officer Jerry Reyes - Director Of Operations
- Services: Brake repair, car maintenance
- Website: www.brakemasters.com

Brake Masters is a privately held automotive repair chain based in Tucson, Arizona. The company has over 100 stores throughout the Southwestern United States, including multiple stores in Arizona, California, Nevada, New Mexico and Texas. The company was founded by two Israeli immigrants, Eric and Shalom Laytin, who in their early twenties came to the United States. The two brothers formed Auto Brakes, Inc. in February 1982. In October 1983, the name of the store was changed to Brake Masters, and in May 1984, the company opened a second store. The company has been accredited with the Better Business Bureau since 1986. A third store opened in March 1989, and the company decided to expand into other markets. Its first franchise store opened in Sierra Vista in August 1994.

19 customer complaints about Brake Masters have been lodged with the Better Business Bureau of Southern Arizona during the past three years. Brake masters has been investigated by ABC news and was found to be charging slightly more than advertised for oil changes. Management response was that this was a computer error that would be fixed.

== Fraud case ==
In 2002 the California Department of Consumer Affairs accused eight Brake Masters shops of fraud. Their licenses were revoked.
