= Sierra Vista Public Transit System =

Cochise County, Arizona, transport agency

- Parent: City of Sierra Vista
- Headquarters: 2050 E. Wilcox Drive
- Locale: Sierra Vista, Arizona
- Service area: Cochise County, Arizona
- Service type: Public transport bus service
- Routes: 5
- Stops: 44
- Fuel type: Diesel
- Operator: Sierra Vista Department of Public Works
- Website: https://vistatransit.org/

The Sierra Vista Public Transit System (colloquially known as Vista Transit) is one of the public transport agencies serving Cochise County, Arizona. As of January 16th, 2025, it is entirely free for any person to ride the bus. Paratransit services are available during business hours for persons with temporary and permanent disabilities.

Bus routes run every 30 minutes on weekdays; they do not operate during the weekends. All 5 routes, categorized by 3 colors (pink, blue, and gray), begin and end the day at the Vista Transit Center.

== Route list ==
- Pink Westbound
- Pink Eastbound
- Blue Northbound
- Blue Southbound
- Gray
