= University of Arizona College of Applied Science and Technology =

University of Arizona College of Applied Science and Technology - Sierra Vista
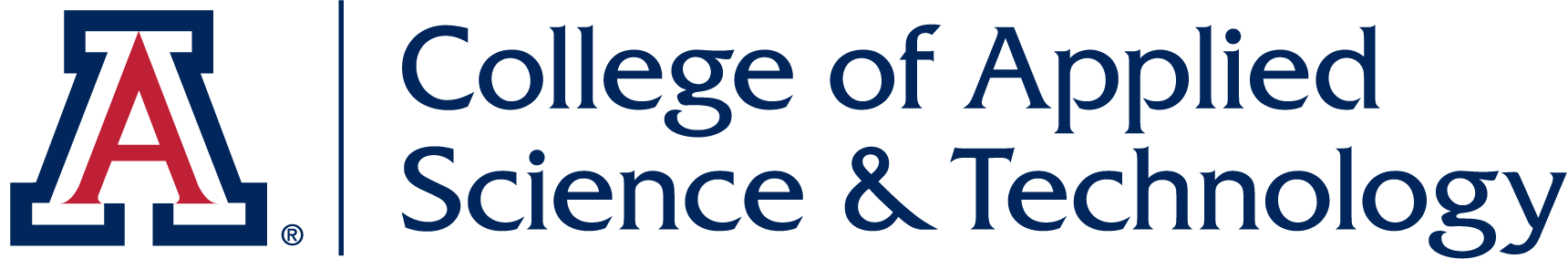
- Type: Public
- Established: March 9, 1995
- Dean: Gary Packard Jr., PhD
- Academic staff: 91
- Administrative staff: 31
- Students: 1,700
- Location: Sierra Vista, Arizona, United States; 31°34′01″N 110°14′45″W
- Campus: Urban
- Colors: UA Red and Arizona Blue
- Mascot: Wildcats
- Website: azcast.arizona.edu

The College of Applied Science and Technology (also called AZCAST or CAST) is a remote campus of the University of Arizona, located in Sierra Vista. The campus offers master's degrees, bachelor's degrees, and certifications that are regionally relevant for both Southern Arizona and the United States Army Intelligence Center of Excellence (USAICoE) and the United States Army Enterprise Technology Command (NETCOM) at Fort Huachuca. The Defense Intelligence Agency (DIA) has designated the University of Arizona's Intelligence program as an Intelligence Community - Center of Academic Excellence (IC-CAE).

== Degrees offered ==
=== Undergraduate ===
==== Bachelor of Arts ====
- Government and Public Service
- Psychology

==== Bachelor of Applied Science ====
- Administration of Justice
- Applied Computing
  - Digital Design
  - Information Management
  - Network Operations
  - Software Development
- Cyber Operations
  - Cyber Engineering
  - Cyber Law and Policy
  - Defense and Forensics
- Early Childhood Education
- Human Services
- Intelligence & Information Operations
  - Information Warfare
  - Law Enforcement Intelligence
  - Operational Intelligence
- Meteorology
- Network Operations
- Organizational Leadership & Regional Commerce
  - Organizational Leadership
  - Regional Commerce

==== Bachelor of Science ====
- Computer Science
- Elementary Education

== Graduate ==
=== Master Degree ===
- Maters of Science, Cyber & Information Operations

== Certifications ==
- Cyber Operations
- Cyber Security
- Instructional Design & Tech
- Military Families
