= Huachuca City, Arizona =

Town in Cochise County, Arizona

Huachuca City
- Town
- Huachuca City, Arizona
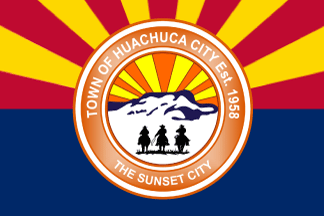
- Flag

- Location of Huachuca City in Cochise County, Arizona.

- Location in the United States Huachuca City (the United States)
- Coordinates: 31°37′38″N 110°20′37″W
- Country: United States
- State: Arizona
- County: Cochise
- Incorporated: 1958

Area
  - Total: 2.83 sq mi (7.32 km^{2})
  - Land: 2.83 sq mi (7.32 km^{2})
  - Water: 0 sq mi (0.00 km^{2})
- Elevation: 4,364 ft (1,330 m)

Population (2020)
  - Total: 1,626
  - Density: 575.3/sq mi (222.12/km^{2})
- Time zone: UTC-7 (MST (no DST))
- ZIP code: 85616
- Area code: 520
- FIPS code: 04-34120
- GNIS feature ID: 2412775
- Website: Town of Huachuca City

Huachuca City is a town in Cochise County, Arizona, United States. As of the 2020 census, the population was 1,626.

Fort Huachuca, a U.S. Army base, is located just south of the municipality.

== History ==
Huachuca City started out as a stop along the Southern Pacific Railroad. The rail stretched between Tombstone and Patagonia and is no longer in operation today. With the re-opening of Fort Huachuca in 1954, the area began to grow and the community went through several name changes: Campstone Station, Sunset City, and Huachuca Vista, before finally settling on the name Huachuca City. It incorporated in 1958.

Today, Huachuca City is a small town located at the north exit of Fort Huachuca, the major employment for the town. With tourism a major business because of the proximity to Tombstone and Kartchner Caverns State Park, Huachuca City is a growing area.

== Geography ==
Huachuca City is located in southwestern Cochise County. The city of Sierra Vista and Fort Huachuca lie along the town's southern border.

According to the United States Census Bureau, the town has a total area of 2.8 square miles (7.3 km^{2}), all land.

=== Climate ===
According to the Köppen Climate Classification system, Huachuca City has a semi-arid climate, abbreviated "BSk" on climate maps.

== Transportation ==
Via Arizona State Route 90 it is 23 miles (37 km) north to Interstate 10, near the city of Benson.

Huachuca City Transit, operated by the city, runs between Huachuca City and Sierra Vista.

== Demographics ==
Historical population
Census	Pop.	Note	%±
1960	1,330		—
1970	1,241		−6.7%
1980	1,661		33.8%
1990	1,782		7.3%
2000	1,751		−1.7%
2010	1,853		5.8%
2020	1,626		−12.3%
U.S. Decennial Census

=== 2020 census ===
As of the 2020 census, Huachuca City had a population of 1,626. The median age was 46.1 years. 21.6% of residents were under the age of 18 and 23.1% of residents were 65 years of age or older. For every 100 females there were 96.1 males, and for every 100 females age 18 and over there were 94.5 males age 18 and over.

0.0% of residents lived in urban areas, while 100.0% lived in rural areas.

There were 774 households in Huachuca City, of which 27.4% had children under the age of 18 living in them. Of all households, 32.2% were married-couple households, 28.2% were households with a male householder and no spouse or partner present, and 33.7% were households with a female householder and no spouse or partner present. About 41.3% of all households were made up of individuals and 18.5% had someone living alone who was 65 years of age or older.

There were 869 housing units, of which 10.9% were vacant. The homeowner vacancy rate was 3.5% and the rental vacancy rate was 7.5%.

Racial composition as of the 2020 census
Race	Number	Percent
White	1,177	72.4%
Black or African American	48	3.0%
American Indian and Alaska Native	17	1.0%
Asian	31	1.9%
Native Hawaiian and Other Pacific Islander	5	0.3%
Some other race	109	6.7%
Two or more races	239	14.7%
Hispanic or Latino (of any race)	398	24.5%

=== 2000 census ===
As of the census of 2000, there were 1,751 people, 713 households, and 432 families residing in the town. The population density was 625.6 inhabitants per square mile (241.5/km^{2}). There were 844 housing units at an average density of 301.5 per square mile (116.4/km^{2}). The racial makeup of the town was 75.4% White, 6.8% Black or African American, 2.7% Native American, 1.5% Asian, 0.2% Pacific Islander, 8.2% from other races, and 5.3% from two or more races. 16.3% of the population were Hispanic or Latino of any race.

There were 713 households, out of which 31.3% had children under the age of 18 living with them, 44.3% were married couples living together, 12.3% had a female householder with no husband present, and 39.3% were non-families. 32.8% of all households were made up of individuals, and 11.5% had someone living alone who was 65 years of age or older. The average household size was 2.43 and the average family size was 3.13.

In the town, the age distribution of the population shows 28.4% under the age of 18, 8.8% from 18 to 24, 25.5% from 25 to 44, 24.6% from 45 to 64, and 12.7% who were 65 years of age or older. The median age was 37 years. For every 100 females, there were 93.1 males. For every 100 females age 18 and over, there were 89.4 males.

The median income for a household in the town was $26,311, and the median income for a family was $33,938. Males had a median income of $26,685 versus $20,179 for females. The per capita income for the town was $14,378. About 13.8% of families and 19.3% of the population were below the poverty line, including 24.6% of those under age 18 and 14.7% of those age 65 or over.
