= Miller Peak (Arizona) =

Mountain in Cochise County, Arizona

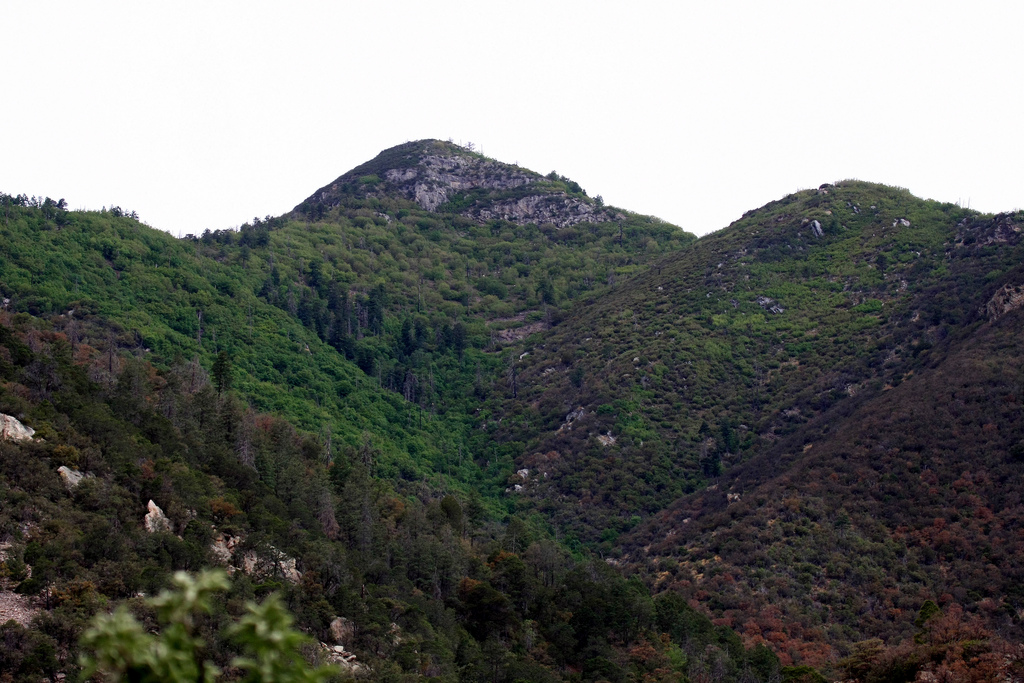
- Miller Canyon

Highest point
- Elevation: 9,470 ft (2,886 m) NAVD 88
- Prominence: 5,006 ft (1,526 m)
- Listing: US most prominent peaks 126th
- Coordinates: 31°23′34″N 110°17′34″W

Geography
- Location within Arizona Location within the United States
- Location: Cochise County, Arizona, U.S.
- Parent range: Huachuca Mountains
- Topo map: USGS Miller Peak

Climbing
- Easiest route: Trail Hike

Miller Peak, at 9,470 feet (2,886 m), is the second-highest mountain in Cochise County, Arizona (after Chiricahua Peak). Located approximately 10 miles south of Sierra Vista, Arizona, it is the highest mountain in the Huachuca mountain range and a popular local hiking destination. The Miller Peak Wilderness encompasses 20,190 acres and is managed by the Coronado National Forest. This is also the most southerly peak and land area to rise above 9,000 feet in the continental United States. The area was affected by the 2011 Monument fire and most of the pine trees seen in older photographs were burned and destroyed. Scrub oak are beginning to replace the areas that were previously covered by pine.

== Hiking up Miller Peak ==
The summit of Miller Peak can be gained by any of several trails, which all involve moderately strenuous hikes requiring approximately 3,500 feet (1,100 m) in elevation gain and 9 to 11 miles (14 to 18 km) distance round-trip. Perhaps the most well-known trailhead is found at the end of Miller Canyon Road, near Hereford, Arizona. Other popular trails include the Montezuma Pass trailhead in the Coronado National Forest and the Carr Peak trailhead, but the short trail to the summit off the main Crest Trail can be reached from nearly any other trail in the Huachucas. Notable landmarks along the way include Bathtub Springs and Bear Saddle. Nearby Carr Peak (9,229 ft or 2,813 m) can be reached in the same day, along the Crest Trail.

== See also ==
- List of mountains and hills of Arizona by height
- List of Ultras of the United States
