= Carr Peak =

Landform in Cochise County, Arizona

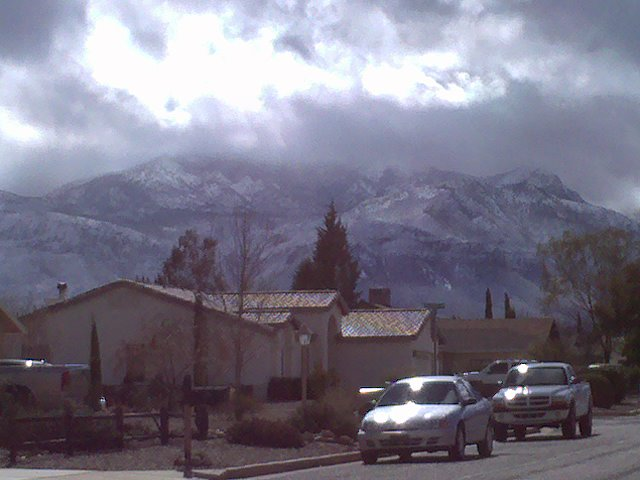

Highest point
- Elevation: 9,229 ft (2,813 m) NAVD 88
- Prominence: 675 ft (206 m)
- Coordinates: 31°24′46″N 110°18′16″W

Geography
- Location within Arizona
- Location: Cochise County, Arizona, U.S.
- Parent range: Huachuca Mountains
- Topo map: USGS Miller Peak

Climbing
- Easiest route: Hike

Carr Peak is the third-highest mountain in Cochise County, Arizona (after Chiricahua Peak and Miller Peak) and is the second-highest mountain in the Huachuca Mountains. It rises about 10 miles (16 km) south of Sierra Vista, Arizona. The summit is in the Miller Peak Wilderness on the Coronado National Forest and about 4 miles (6 km) south of the Nature Conservancy's Ramsey Canyon Preserve. The area is well known among birders because of the variety of hummingbird species (as many as 15) seen in the area as well as the dozens of southwestern specialties such as Apache pine, Chihuahua pine, ridge-nosed rattlesnake, lesser long-nosed bat and elegant trogon.

== Carr Peak Trail #107 ==
This trail is not only easy to get to, but also provides a relatively moderate hike to some of the best views in the Huachucas. In the process it also offers access to two of the highest points in southeastern Arizona, Carr Peak and (via the Crest Trail #103) Miller Peak. For these reasons, this combination of trails provides some of the most popular hiking on the Sierra Vista District.

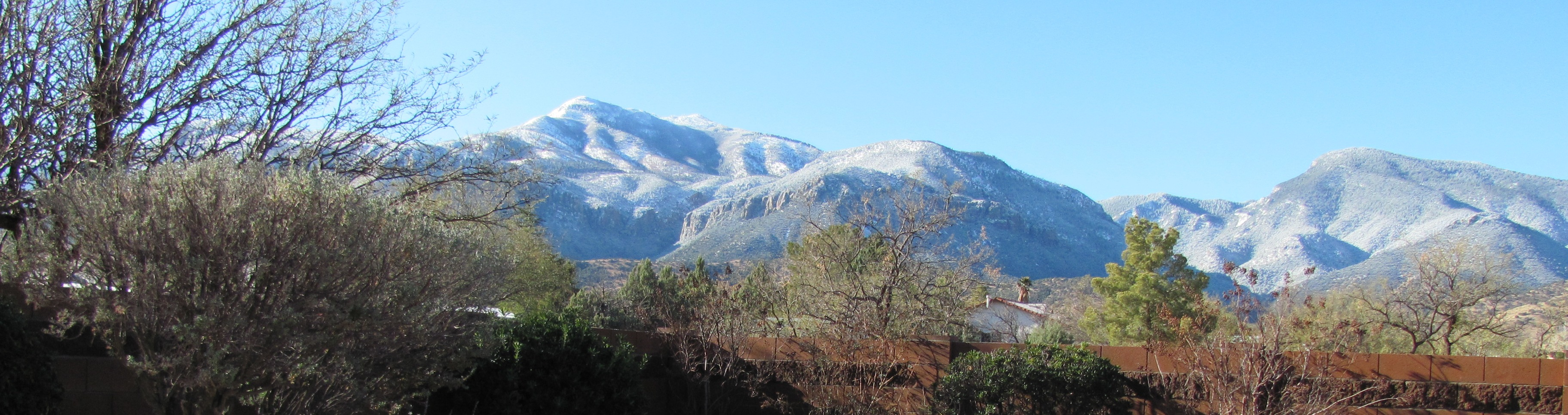
Carr and Ramsey Peaks in the Huachuca Mountains

Carr Peak Trail is conveniently accessible from both the Reef Townsite Campground and Ramsey Vista Campground on scenic Carr Canyon Road. The main trailhead is located at the edge of a parking area just outside Ramsey Vista Campground. Other means of access are provided by a short spur that comes directly out of the Ramsey Vista Campground, and the Old Sawmill Spring Trail from the parking lot across FR 368 from the Reef Townsite Campground.

Much of the 2,000-foot (610 m) climb from the trailhead to the summit is through an area that has been burned by at least three wildfires, one in 1977 that scorched much of the upper reaches of the mountain range, a smaller one in 1991, and the Monument Fire in 2011. These areas of disturbance are well on their way to healing naturally as various shrubs, trees and wildflowers return to reclaim them. In places where a short time ago only ashes, burnt snags and bare dirt could be found, healthy communities of young aspens are already putting on brilliant displays of fall colors.

The trail offers good views of the upper reaches of Carr Peak and of Miller Peak across Miller Canyon. To get to the top of Carr Peak, you'll need to follow the short but steep Carr Peak Spur. The main trail continues on to a connection with the Crest Trail, which offers access not only to Miller Peak, but to the rest of the Huachuca Mountains trail network.

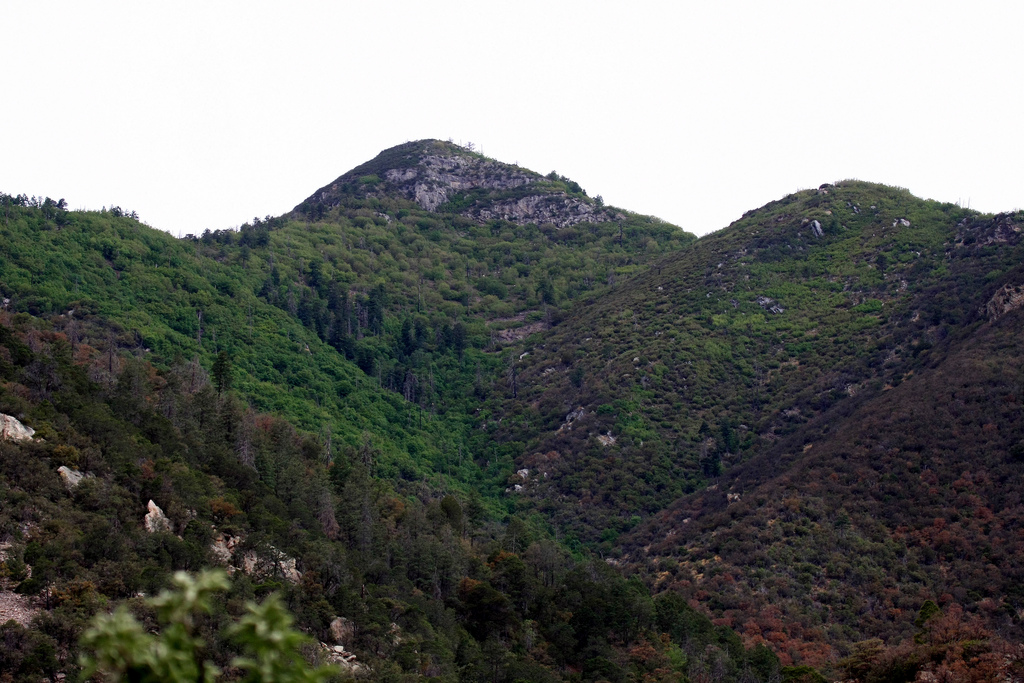
Miller Canyon and Carr Peak

== See also ==
- List of mountains and hills of Arizona by height
