= Nicksville, Arizona =

- Populated place
- Location within the state of Arizona Nicksville (the United States)
- Coordinates: 31°26′18″N 110°14′56″W
- Country: United States
- State: Arizona
- County: Cochise
- Elevation: 4,817 ft (1,468 m)
- Time zone: UTC-7 (Mountain (MST))
  - Summer (DST): UTC-7 (MST)
- Area code: 520
- FIPS code: 04-49500
- GNIS feature ID: 32321

Nicksville is a populated place in Cochise County, Arizona, just north of the international border between the United States and Mexico.

== Transportation ==
Cochise Connection provides bus connections between Douglas, Bisbee, and Sierra Vista, with a stop in Nicksville.
