= Whetstone, Arizona =

CDP in Cochise County, Arizona

- CDP
- Location of Whetstone in Cochise County, Arizona.

- Location in the United States
- Coordinates: 31°43′34″N 110°16′23″W
- Country: United States
- State: Arizona
- County: Cochise

Area
  - Total: 93.96 sq mi (243.36 km^{2})
  - Land: 93.95 sq mi (243.34 km^{2})
  - Water: 0.0039 sq mi (0.01 km^{2})
- Elevation: 4,193 ft (1,278 m)

Population (2020)
  - Total: 3,236
  - Density: 34/sq mi (13.3/km^{2})
- Time zone: UTC-7 (MST (no DST))
- ZIP code: 85616
- Area code: 520
- FIPS code: 04-82155
- GNIS feature ID: 2409579

Whetstone is a census-designated place (CDP) in Cochise County, Arizona, United States, north of Sierra Vista. The population was 3,236 at the 2020 census.

== History ==
Whetstone was often referred to as the "Y" because the intersection of State Routes 82 and 90 had an eastbound lane on 90 and a southbound lane on 82 that created a Y at the intersection. Highway 90 ended one to two miles further north, and people traveling north had to go via Highway 82 east or west and then north on either Highway 83 or Highway 80.

== Parks and Outdoors ==
Whetstone is known for its tranquil desert and proximity to Parks and Recreational Areas such as Kartchner Caverns State Park and Coronado National Forest.

== Geography ==
According to the United States Census Bureau, the CDP has a total area of 11.8 square miles (31 km^{2}), all land.

== Demographics ==
Historical population
Census	Pop.	Note	%±
2000	2,354		—
2010	2,617		11.2%
2020	3,236		23.7%
U.S. Decennial Census

=== 2020 census ===
As of the 2020 census, Whetstone had a population of 3,236. The median age was 54.4 years. 15.4% of residents were under the age of 18 and 28.2% of residents were 65 years of age or older. For every 100 females there were 104.4 males, and for every 100 females age 18 and over there were 101.9 males age 18 and over.

0.0% of residents lived in urban areas, while 100.0% lived in rural areas.

There were 1,452 households in Whetstone, of which 20.3% had children under the age of 18 living in them. Of all households, 51.0% were married-couple households, 22.4% were households with a male householder and no spouse or partner present, and 20.7% were households with a female householder and no spouse or partner present. About 28.8% of all households were made up of individuals and 15.0% had someone living alone who was 65 years of age or older.

There were 1,623 housing units, of which 10.5% were vacant. The homeowner vacancy rate was 2.5% and the rental vacancy rate was 10.5%.

Racial composition as of the 2020 census
Race	Number	Percent
White	2,620	81.0%
Black or African American	46	1.4%
American Indian and Alaska Native	37	1.1%
Asian	36	1.1%
Native Hawaiian and Other Pacific Islander	9	0.3%
Some other race	149	4.6%
Two or more races	339	10.5%
Hispanic or Latino (of any race)	508	15.7%

=== 2010 census ===
The population of Whetstone was 2,617 at the 2010 census.

=== 2000 census ===
As of the census of 2000, there were 2,354 people, 904 households, and 664 families residing in the CDP. The population density was 199.5 inhabitants per square mile (77.0/km^{2}). There were 1,056 housing units at an average density of 89.5 per square mile (34.6/km^{2}). The racial makeup of the CDP was 84.0% White, 2.9% Black or African American, 1.2% Native American, 0.9% Asian, 6.5% from other races, and 4.5% from two or more races. 13.8% of the population were Hispanic or Latino of any race.

There were 904 households, out of which 32.7% had children under the age of 18 living with them, 57.2% were married couples living together, 10.7% had a female householder with no husband present, and 26.5% were non-families. 20.7% of all households were made up of individuals, and 6.9% had someone living alone who was 65 years of age or older. The average household size was 2.60 and the average family size was 3.02.

In the CDP, the age distribution of the population shows 27.4% under the age of 18, 5.6% from 18 to 24, 25.3% from 25 to 44, 28.0% from 45 to 64, and 13.7% who were 65 years of age or older. The median age was 40 years. For every 100 females, there were 97.3 males. For every 100 females age 18 and over, there were 95.0 males.

The median income for a household in the CDP was $34,507, and the median income for a family was $37,656. Males had a median income of $32,083 versus $25,424 for females. The per capita income for the CDP was $16,370. About 13.4% of families and 20.0% of the population were below the poverty line, including 32.3% of those under age 18 and 1.3% of those age 65 or over.
