= Sierra Vista, Arizona =

City in Arizona, United States

Sierra Vista
- City
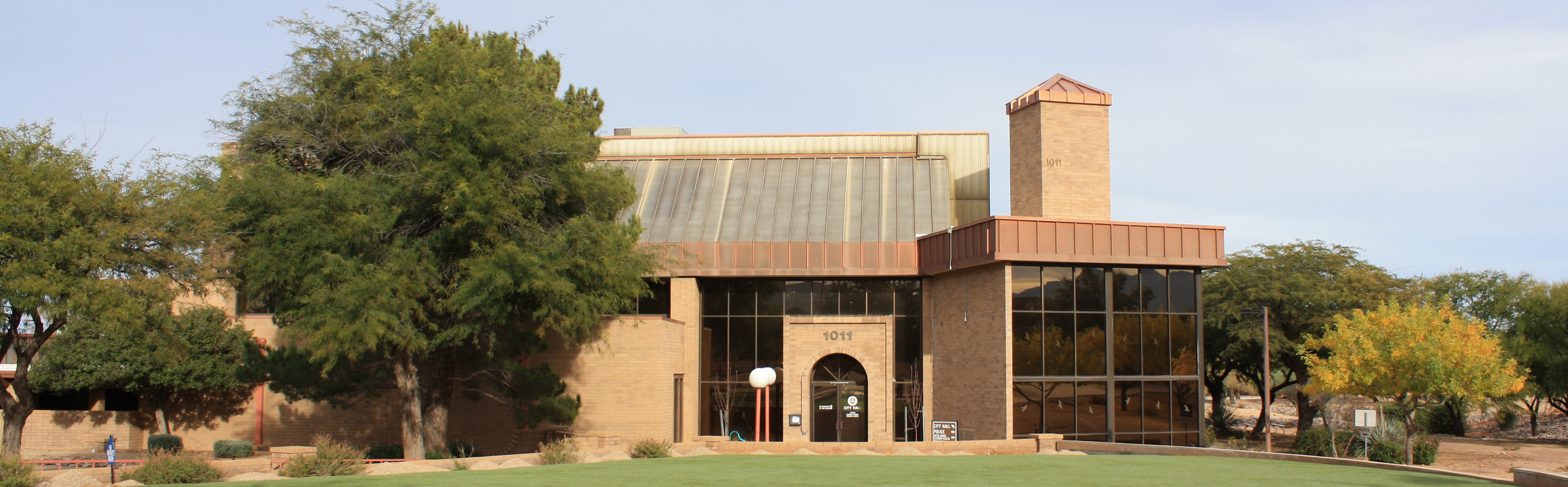
- Sierra Vista, Arizona City Hall

- Flag
- Nickname: Hummingbird Capital of the United States
- Location of Sierra Vista in Cochise County, Arizona
- Interactive map outlining Sierra Vista
- Location in Arizona Location in the United States
- Coordinates: 31°32′44″N 110°16′35″W
- Country: United States
- State: Arizona
- County: Cochise
- Incorporated: 1956

Government
  - Type: Council-manager government
  - Body: Sierra Vista City Council
  - Mayor: Clea McCaa
  - City Council: List: • William Benning; • Marta Messmer; • Gregory Johnson; • Angelica Landry; • Mark Rodriguez; • Carolyn Umphrey

Area
  - Total: 152.51 sq mi (395.00 km^{2})
  - Land: 152.25 sq mi (394.33 km^{2})
  - Water: 0.26 sq mi (0.68 km^{2})
- Elevation: 4,633 ft (1,412 m)

Population (2020)
  - Total: 45,308
  - Density: 298/sq mi (114.9/km^{2})
- Time zone: UTC−7 (MST (no DST))
- ZIP codes: 85613, 85635, 85636, 85650, 85670
- Area code: 520
- FIPS code: 04-66820
- Website: www.sierravistaaz.gov

Sierra Vista (/siˌɛrə ˈvɪstə/; Spanish: [ˈsjera ˈβista]) is a city in Cochise County, Arizona, United States. According to the 2020 Census, the population of the city is 45,308, and is the 27th most populous city in Arizona. The city is part of the Sierra Vista-Douglas Metropolitan Area, with a 2010 population of 131,346. Fort Huachuca, a U.S. Army post, has been incorporated and is located in the northwest part of the city. Sierra Vista is bordered by the cities of Huachuca City and Whetstone to the north and Sierra Vista Southeast to the South.

Sierra Vista, Spanish for 'mountain view', is 75 miles (121 km) southeast of Tucson and serves as the main commercial, cultural, and recreational hub of Cochise County. Sierra Vista is located on the southwestern side of Cochise County and is 15 miles (24 km) southwest of Tombstone, 20 miles (32 km) northwest of Bisbee, and 15 miles (24 km) from the border of Mexico. The closest port of entry to Mexico is Naco in the Mexican state of Sonora which is 24 miles (39 km) from Sierra Vista to the southeast. Sierra Vista is home to University of Arizona, College of Applied Science and Technology, a Defense Intelligence Agency (DIA) designated Intelligence Community - Center of Academic Excellence (IC-CAE) university, Cochise College, and Wick Communications, a media company operating 27 newspapers and 18 specialty publications in 11 states.

== History ==
As evidenced by several neolithic sites, which include the Murray Springs Clovis Site and known archeological sites like the Lehner Mammoth-Kill Site, Paleo-Indians, along with animals including mammoths, horses, tapirs, bison, and camels occupied the area more than 11,000 years ago. Both the Murray Springs Clovis Site and the Lehner Mammoth-Kill Site became National Historic Landmarks. This area was home to a large Sobaipuri Pueblo near Fairbank which had several smaller pueblos and settlements throughout the valley, a Spanish Fort, Presidio Santa Cruz de Terrenate between modern Huachuca City , Whetstone, and Tombstone, on the west bank of the San Pedro River. along with a few Spanish settlers supporting the route to Tucson's Mission San Xavier del Bac and Presidio San Agustín del Tucsón. Coronado National Memorial was established in the southern Huachuca Mountains to commemorate the expedition of the Spanish conquistador Francisco Vázquez de Coronado utilizing the nearby San Pedro River in his northward search of the Cities of Cíbola, which are often referred to as the mythical Seven Cities of Gold.

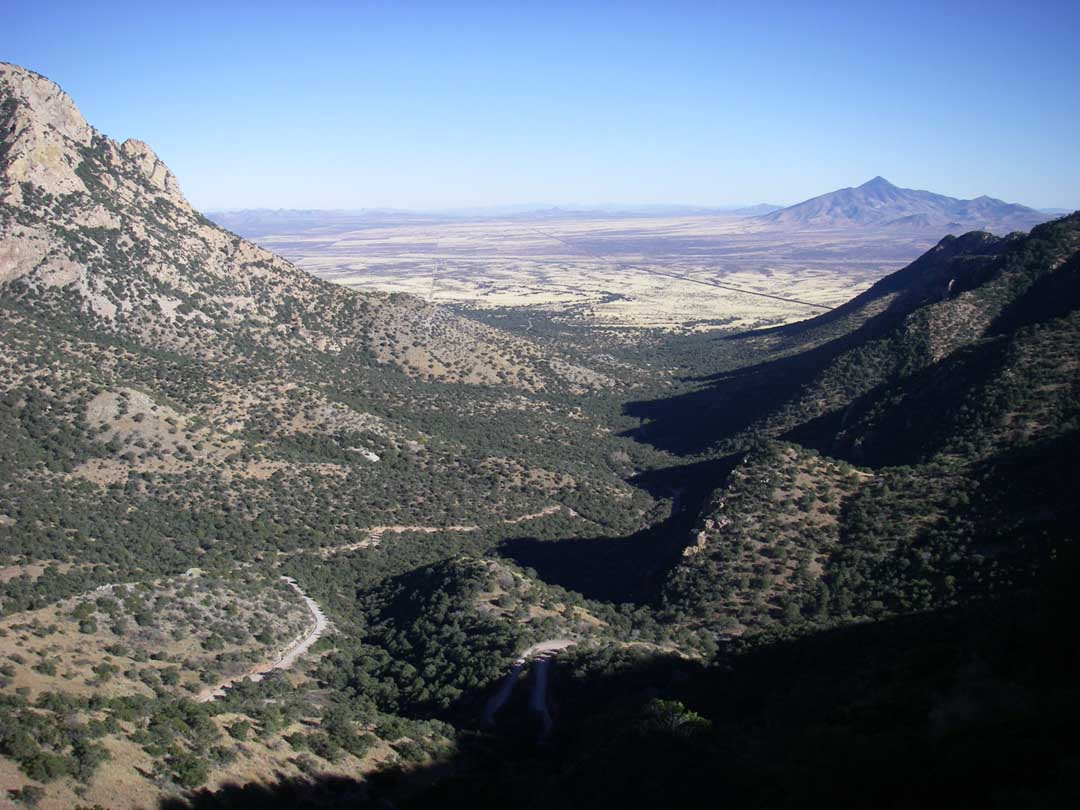
Montezuma Pass at Coronado National Memorial. The United States / Mexican border fence can be seen in the middle of this photograph. Mexico is on the right / south side of the fence.

Like most of Cochise County, this area was part of the Gadsden Purchase of 1854. Camp Huachuca was established in 1877. At the end of the Apache Wars in 1886, with the protection of the fort and the completion of the Southern Pacific and El Paso & Southwestern railroads, the San Pedro Valley began to be populated by American settlers. The name of the settlement around that time was Papingo.

The first business that opened just outside the east gate of Fort Huachuca was a saloon and "house of ill repute" owned by John and Ellen Reilly, which opened in 1892. The area became known as the White City. In 1911, Margaret Carmichael bought the Reilly homestead and business. By 1913, Margaret Carmichael had leased the business back to the Reillys. Also in 1913, a group of dry land farmers settled in the local area and named their settlement Buena. Buena was east of Garden Canyon, between Lewis Springs and Fort Huachuca, east of the junction of present-day Hwy 90 and Hwy 92. At this site was a post office and a school house that served children in Buena, Garden Canyon, and outreaches of the local area. Oliver Fry and his two oldest sons traveled from Texas on the railroad and settled on 320 acres (1.3 km^{2}) just east of Fort Huachuca in January 1913.

By 1917, the Overton Post Office was established. This name came from the Overton Mercantile and Investment Company, which took an option on the Carmichael property with plans to develop a townsite outside Fort Huachuca. It is believed that the company was unable to persuade anyone to move to the area, so when the option expired the Carmichaels took back the property with a general mercantile store and the post office.

In 1918, the Carmichaels named their store after the Garden Canyon Sawmill. They also called their post office, where Carmichael was the postmaster, Garden Canyon. The Carmichaels built a home across the street from Garden Canyon store, as well as 18 stone houses, on Garden Avenue. From 1927 to 1938, the Frys rented the Carmichael store and ran the post office. The Frys established their own general store and the first federally recognized post office in 1938, the Fry Post Office, so the name of this settlement changed to Fry. By World War II, Fry's reputation was less than salubrious. According to the "Employment of Negro Troops" (CMH), "Because it was surrounded by a desert with no nearby communities and because it was located in a part of the country with practically no Negro population, Fort Huachuca, since the days when it was a frontier post garrisoned with Negro soldiers of the old regiments, had considered Fry a quasi-necessary adjunct.... In Fry lived women.... As the post commander described it in 1942: The small town of Fry is dirty, unsanitary and squalid. It has been so for many years. It was made worse in these respects during the construction of the cantonment...." (p. 282)

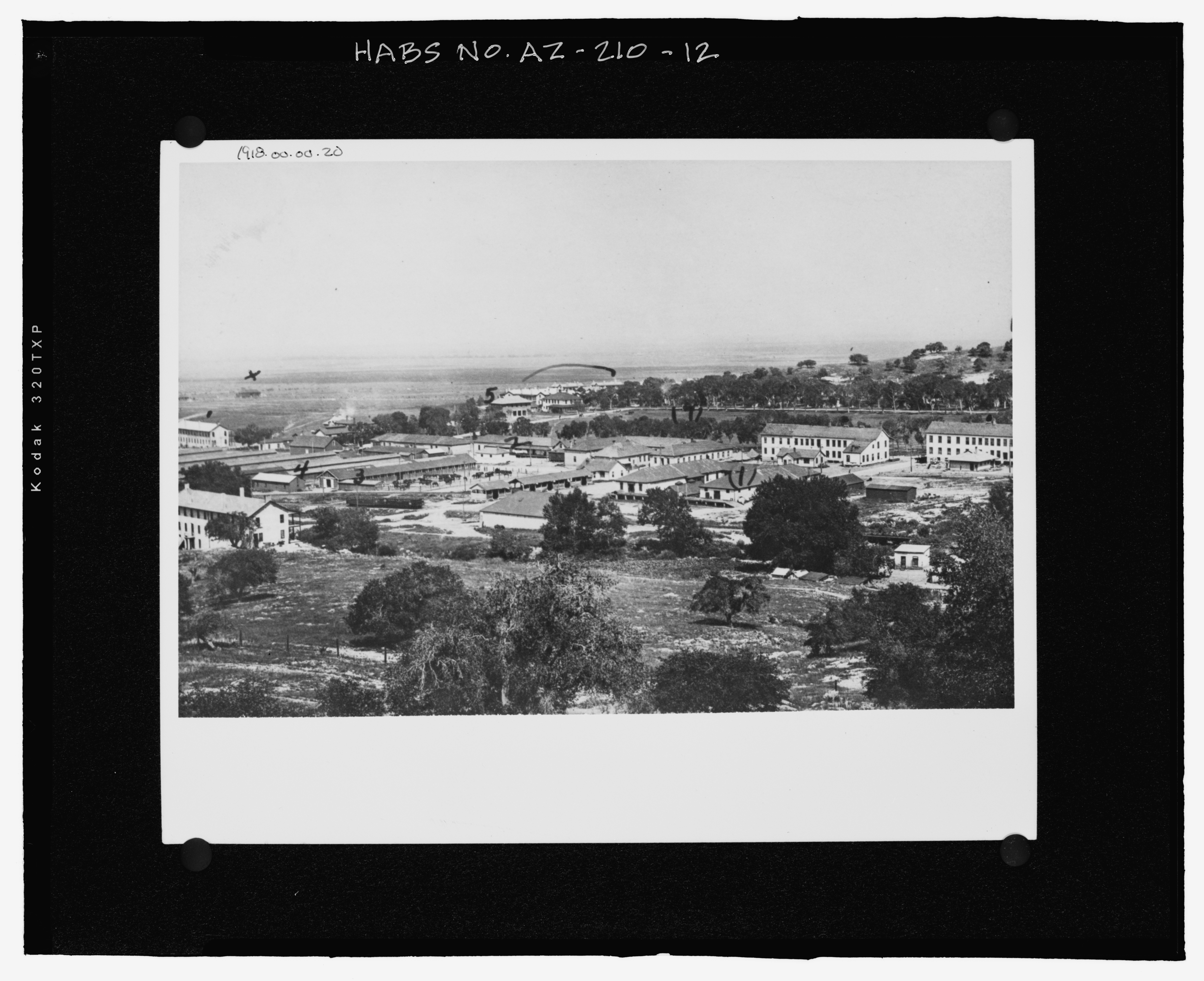
Fort Huachuca, 1918

When the base was reactivated on February 1, 1954, base commander Brigadier General Emil Lenzner, pushed for incorporation as both a way to solve the on-base housing problems as well as to distance themselves from reputation of "The White City" and Fry Town Settlement, hoping to encourage people to want to live off base in a more family-friendly community, away from undesirables like the minorities allowed to live unsegregated in Fry Town. Petitions for incorporation began to be filed in 1955 and were legally accepted in 1956, which included what had been Garden Canyon and Buena but did not include most of Fry Town. This was in part to keep a Federal Housing Authority (FHA) housing project contacts for housing off post away from the Fry Town area, and was used as a rationale to incorporate and begin getting a share of tax revenues without having to pay the Fry family for the parts of Fry Town considered desirable and wholesome.

In 1955, the first attempt to incorporate and rename the area was rejected, as Fry opposed both incorporating and renaming the town that bore his family name. In 1956, the ballot issue failed 76 to 61. People who owned land outside of Fry's property in the area of Garden Canyon/Overton and Buena, as well as parts of Fry went forward with incorporation and renaming by petition on May 26, 1956, excluding the half-square-mile owned by Fry that included the local red light district called "the White City" as well as off base housing of the African-American "Buffalo" soldier officers' families, and other minorities and groups they considered undesirable in the 1950s. They were described as the "Fry People." When Sierra Vista was incorporated, it did not include the enclave of Fry, which remains an unincorporated area within the city of Sierra Vista.

Sierra Vista was incorporated in 1956. The proposed town council held a radio contest asking for names of the proposed town. Marie Pfister, the city clerk, asked her friend Nola Walker to store the suggestions. When the town was approved, they called Nola for the contest winner, but without counting the votes she told them her personal entry of "Sierra Vista" was the winner. On July 13, 2006, at a special ceremony during the city's 50th anniversary, Nola was granted "clemency" for her misrepresentation of the vote.

In 1961 the community had grown large enough to be classified as a city, allowing the establishment of a community college. In 1973 Ethel Berger became the first female mayor in Arizona. In the 1970s the Art in the Park Festival was established by a committee of Army Wives, with it proceeds benefiting the Huachuca Arts Association, and college scholarships. Sierra Vista annexed Fort Huachuca, a U.S. military base, one of the largest employers in Arizona, and the adjacent community, in 1971.

Sierra Vista was the site of the first McDonald's drive thru, which opened in 1975. The owner, Dave Rich, drove the innovative approach to gain the business of the soldiers from nearby Fort Huachuca. At that time, soldiers were not allowed to wear their military fatigues off of the military base with the exception of driving or riding inside vehicles.

Sierra Vista has a population of over 43,000 today. The city is the economic and commercial center of Cochise County.

Known historical names for the area:

- 1878 Papingo
- 1898 Overton
- 1909 Garden Canyon
- 1915 Buena
- 1938 Fry, Frytown, Fry Township, Fry Settlement
- 1942–1945 "The White City", "Green Top" or "The Hook"
- 1955 Town of Sierra Vista
- 1961 City of Sierra Vista

== Geography ==
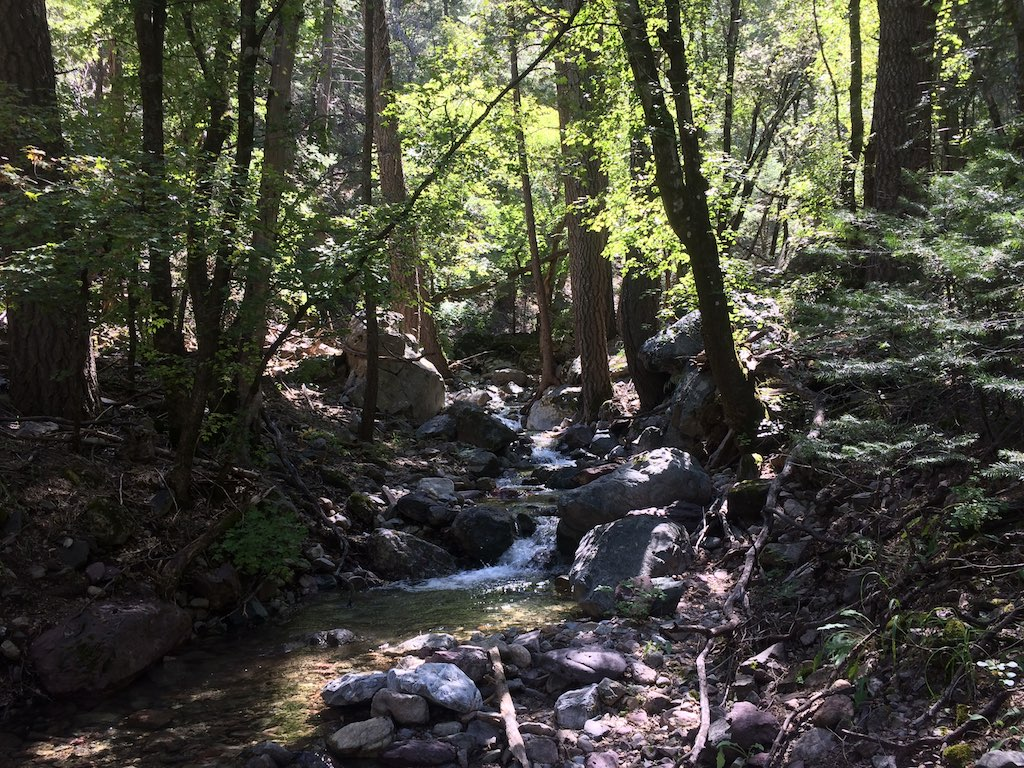
Ramsey Canyon

Sierra Vista is in southwestern Cochise County at 31°32′44″N 110°16′35″W (31.545498, −110.276500). It is bordered on the northwest by the much smaller town of Huachuca City.

According to the United States Census Bureau, the city has an area of 152.5 square miles (395.1 km^{2}), of which 152.3 square miles (394.4 km^{2}) is land and 0.27 square miles (0.7 km^{2}) is water. It is 4,623 feet (1,409 m) above sea level. Sierra Vista is flanked on the southwest side by the Huachuca Mountains, with Miller Peak rising to 9,466 feet (2,885 m) and Carr Peak to 9,236 feet (2,815 m), both south of the city limits. The city is accessible via Arizona State Routes 90 and 92. The San Pedro River flows just east of the city limits.

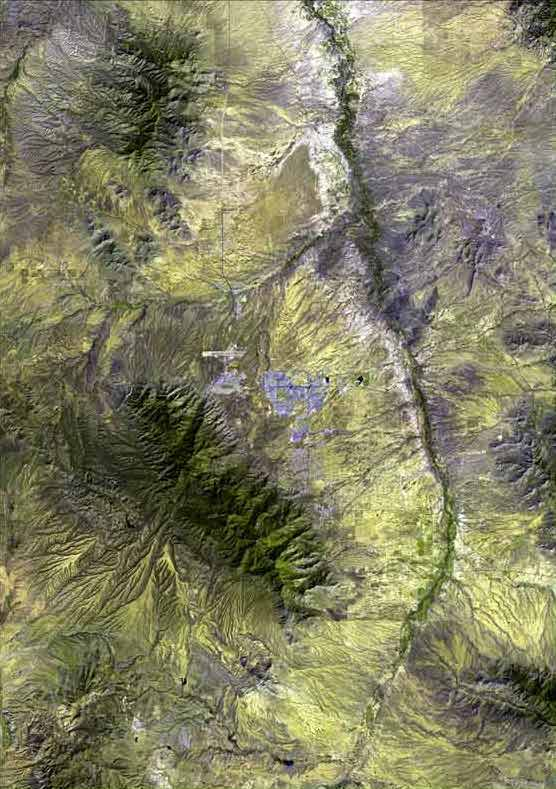
Geography surrounding Sierra Vista

=== Climate ===
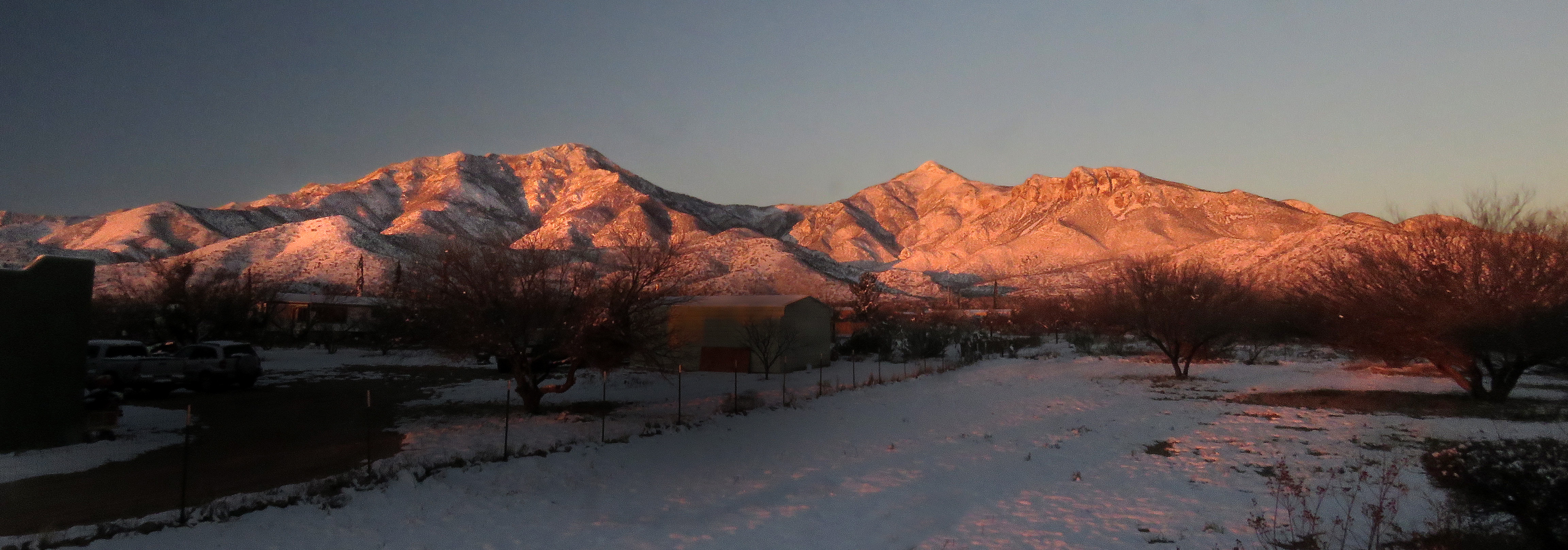
Huachuca Mountains in the winter

In the Köppen climate classification system, Sierra Vista falls within the typical cold semi-arid climate (BSk) of mid-altitude Arizona. Fall and spring, like most other parts of Arizona, are very dry. Winters are cool to cold with frosts which can occasionally be hard freezes; frost can be expected to stop in mid- to late April. Spring, like fall, spends about half of itself within the frost season. Summer starts off dry, but progressively gets wetter as the monsoon season approaches. The city has a fairly stable climate with very little humidity. However, the North American Monsoon can bring torrential rains during the months of July and August and will produce almost half the yearly rainfall in just those two months alone. Due to the dry climate the rest of the year and the city's high elevation, daily winter low temperatures range from 20 to 30 °F (−6.7 to −1.1 °C) on average and up to 50 °F (10.0 °C) on rare occasions when moist fronts bring warm air from the Gulf of California. Snow is not a common sight on the streets of Sierra Vista though some years the city can receive several inches of snow and other years it will receive none. However, a snow-capped Miller Peak and Carr Peak in the Huachuca Mountains is a common sight for four to five months every year.

The highest recorded temperature was 110 °F (43 °C) on June 20, 2017.
The lowest recorded temperature was 4 °F (−16 °C) on February 3, 2011.
The maximum average rainfall occurs in August.

Climate data for Sierra Vista, Arizona, 1991–2020 normals, extremes 1982–present
Month	Jan	Feb	Mar	Apr	May	Jun	Jul	Aug	Sep	Oct	Nov	Dec	Year
Record high °F (°C)	81 (27)	86 (30)	95 (35)	97 (36)	102 (39)	110 (43)	108 (42)	105 (41)	103 (39)	96 (36)	86 (30)	81 (27)	110 (43)
Mean maximum °F (°C)	72.7 (22.6)	75.8 (24.3)	82.2 (27.9)	87.8 (31.0)	94.9 (34.9)	100.8 (38.2)	100.1 (37.8)	98.2 (36.8)	94.4 (34.7)	90.0 (32.2)	80.4 (26.9)	74.4 (23.6)	102.2 (39.0)
Mean daily maximum °F (°C)	61.3 (16.3)	64.4 (18.0)	70.5 (21.4)	77.5 (25.3)	85.0 (29.4)	93.9 (34.4)	91.5 (33.1)	89.5 (31.9)	86.8 (30.4)	80.0 (26.7)	70.0 (21.1)	61.6 (16.4)	77.7 (25.4)
Daily mean °F (°C)	45.4 (7.4)	48.5 (9.2)	54.0 (12.2)	60.2 (15.7)	67.7 (19.8)	76.8 (24.9)	77.0 (25.0)	75.5 (24.2)	71.7 (22.1)	63.5 (17.5)	53.4 (11.9)	45.6 (7.6)	61.6 (16.5)
Mean daily minimum °F (°C)	29.5 (−1.4)	32.6 (0.3)	37.5 (3.1)	42.8 (6.0)	50.4 (10.2)	59.6 (15.3)	62.5 (16.9)	61.5 (16.4)	56.7 (13.7)	47.1 (8.4)	36.8 (2.7)	29.5 (−1.4)	45.5 (7.5)
Mean minimum °F (°C)	22.9 (−5.1)	25.1 (−3.8)	30.0 (−1.1)	34.4 (1.3)	43.8 (6.6)	53.7 (12.1)	59.6 (15.3)	59.5 (15.3)	53.2 (11.8)	38.9 (3.8)	27.7 (−2.4)	22.2 (−5.4)	19.5 (−6.9)
Record low °F (°C)	12 (−11)	4 (−16)	22 (−6)	24 (−4)	35 (2)	43 (6)	51 (11)	53 (12)	43 (6)	26 (−3)	19 (−7)	15 (−9)	4 (−16)
Average precipitation inches (mm)	0.78 (20)	0.64 (16)	0.48 (12)	0.25 (6.4)	0.20 (5.1)	0.54 (14)	3.53 (90)	3.31 (84)	1.31 (33)	0.59 (15)	0.53 (13)	0.85 (22)	13.01 (330.5)
Average snowfall inches (cm)	0.4 (1.0)	0.0 (0.0)	0.0 (0.0)	0.0 (0.0)	0.0 (0.0)	0.0 (0.0)	0.0 (0.0)	0.0 (0.0)	0.0 (0.0)	0.0 (0.0)	0.0 (0.0)	0.0 (0.0)	0.4 (1)
Average precipitation days (≥ 0.01 in)	3.8	3.7	2.3	1.1	1.3	2.4	12.3	11.0	4.8	2.5	1.9	3.4	50.5
Average snowy days (≥ 0.1 in)	0.2	0.1	0.0	0.0	0.0	0.0	0.0	0.0	0.0	0.0	0.0	0.0	0.3
Source 1: NOAA
Source 2: National Weather Service

== Parks and outdoors ==
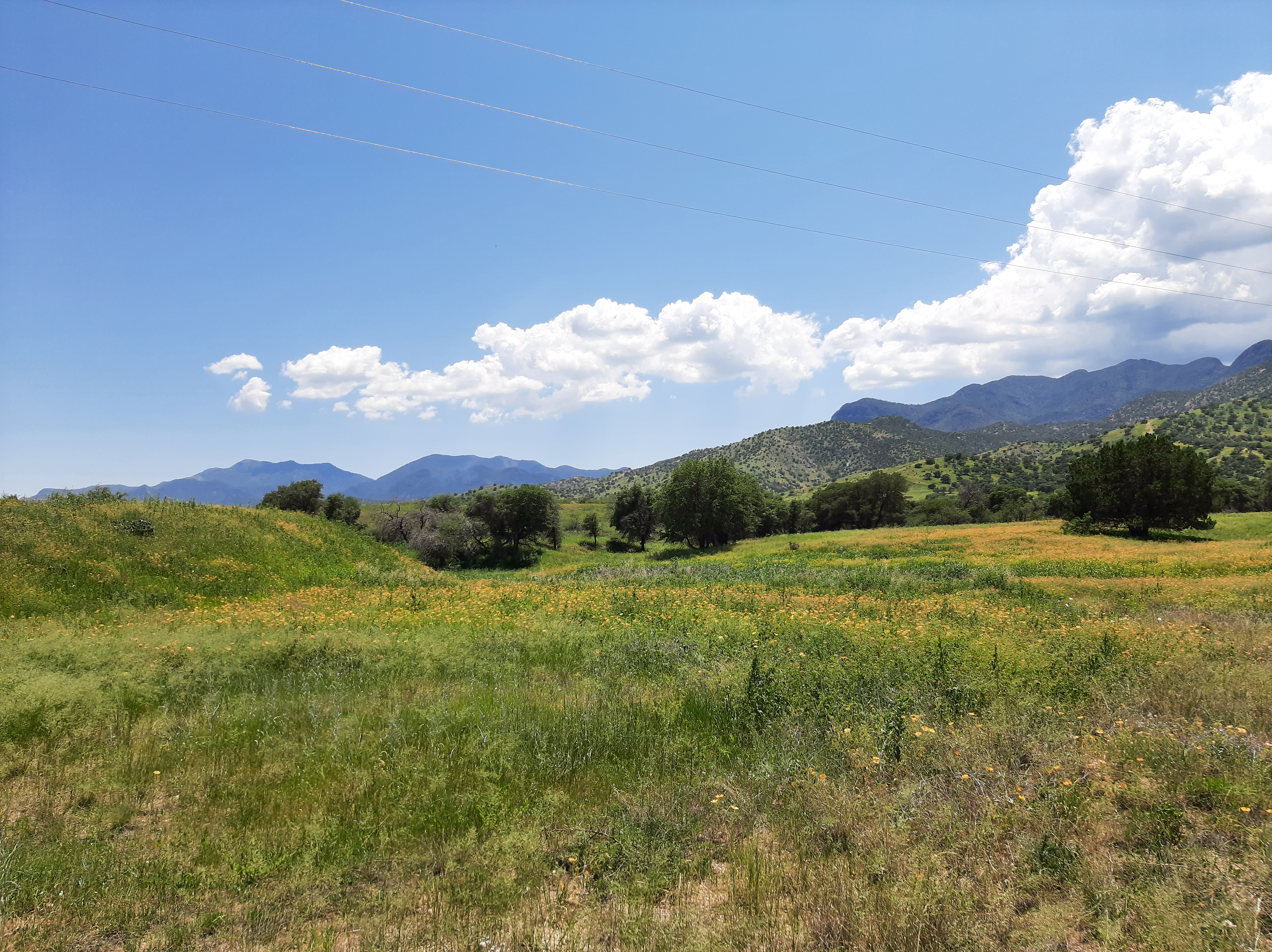
Huachuca Mountains after Monsoon

=== Bird watching ===
Nicknamed the "Hummingbird Capital of the United States", the city sees bird watchers from all over the world flock to the nearby Ramsey Canyon Preserve and other local canyons to observe and photograph hundreds of different bird species. In the Huachuca Mountains, Ramsey Canyon is one of the prime locations to see hummingbirds in the U.S. An ecological crossroads between desert and tropics, the mountains that rise from the arid surroundings of this part of southeastern Arizona trap rainfall and create island-like biodiverse areas. Among numerous other plants and animals, the Ramsey Canyon wildlife reserve is home to 15 hummingbird species. Most notable are the beryline and violet-crowned hummingbirds, which breed in Central America but only migrate as far north as the southwestern United States. Other outdoor sightseeing and recreational opportunities that are nearby include the San Pedro Riparian National Conservation Area, the Coronado National Memorial in the Huachuca Mountains, and Parker Canyon Lake. Excellent views of the clear night sky have led Sierra Vista to become the chosen center of amateur astronomy in Arizona, with more than a dozen well equipped amateur observatories in the area and a large observatory at the University of Arizona College of Applied Science & Technology within the city limits.

=== Ramsey Canyon ===
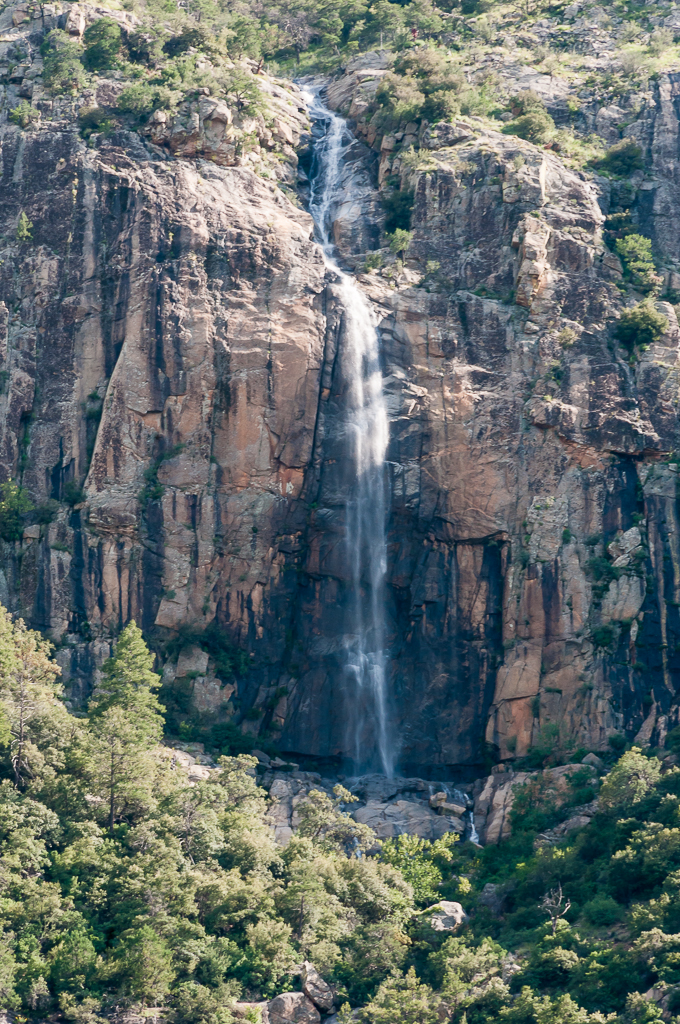
Seasonal 300 ft Carr Canyon Falls

Ramsey Canyon in the Huachuca Mountains was named after Gardner Ramsey after his arrival in the 1880s. Ramsey Canyon Preserve is at the end of Ramsey Canyon Road west of Arizona Highway 92. The preserve provides an excellent bird watching experience with two loop trails. The shorter loop trail is around half a mile long while the longer trail is around a mile. Two historic structures can be found along the trail. James Cabin, a log cabin dating to 1902, was built by John James on Ramsey Canyon Creek. The James House, built in 1911, is on the other side of the creek and provided a larger dwelling for the James family. Ramsey Canyon Trail is a longer (2.4 mile) trail, also known as Hamburg Trail, and is just beyond the Nature Conservancy preserve. The trail has an elevation change of 1,300 feet and enters the 20,000 acre Miller Peak Wilderness which is part of the Coronado National Forest after passing the Pat Scott Canyon and Wisconsin Canyon junction that includes the old prospecting site of Hamburg Mine.

=== Carr Canyon ===
Carr Canyon, named after James Carr, is accessible by the Carr Canyon Road and is a scenic drive in the Coronado National Forest. The rough road is seven miles long with only two of the seven miles paved. It was originally built by James Carr in 1881 and requires a high clearance vehicle to traverse. Carr Canyon roads ends at the Reef Townsite at an elevation of 7,400 feet (2,256 m). Near the entrance of Carr Canyon is the historic Carr House, built in 1932, which is an information center operated by the Forest Service.

=== Parks ===
The city of Sierra Vista maintains 17 different parks with Veterans Memorial Park being the largest measuring around 40 acres. Veterans Memorial Park consists of an Aquatic center called The Cove, benches, bike racks, children's playgrounds, drinking fountains, flag pole, horseshoe pits, grass play area, Ramadas, restrooms, skate and bike court, softball fields, teen and youth center, and volleyball courts. Veterans Memorial Park holds the largest events festivals in Sierra Vista to include the yearly Easter Eggstravaganza, Festival of the Southwest, Oktoberfest, Art in the Park, Cars in the Park, and a weekly Farmers Market. The other parks within Sierra Vista include Len Roberts Park, Hubert Tompkins Park, Garden Canyon Linear Park, Chaparral Village Park, Ciaramitaro Park, Bella Vista Park, Country Club Park, Nancy Hakes Park, Purple Heart Park, Soldier's Creek Park, Summit Park, Timothy Lane Park, A.V. Anderson Park, Bolin Airfield, James R. Landwehr Plaza, and Cyr Center Park.

=== The Cove ===
The Sierra Vista Aquatic Center, known as "The Cove", is a 36,500-square-foot (3,390 m^{2}) facility that contains 11,347 sq ft (1,054.2 m^{2}) of pool water surface, which equates to over 575,000 US gallons (2,180,000 L; 479,000 imp gal) of water. The Aquatic Center boasts a 0' depth, or "beach", entry, eight 25-yard lap lanes for lap and competitive swimming, and a wave machine with several wave patterns for Open Swim. The Cove has a submersible bulkhead which makes the switch from wave pool to competitive pool possible. The Cove also has a warm water therapy pool, children's lagoon with slide, two 1 meter diving boards and one 3 meter diving board, and two enclosed water tube slides to include a 150-foot (46 m) water tube slide.

=== Veterans Memorial Cemetery ===
Sierra Vista is home to one of four Arizona Veterans Memorial Cemeteries. Since it was developed by the Arizona Department of Veterans' Services over 7,000 burials have been conducted. Entertainer and US Navy veteran of World War II Emmett Kelly Jr. is buried there.

== Demographics ==
Historical population
Census	Pop.	Note	%±
1960	3,121		—
1970	6,689		114.3%
1980	24,937		272.8%
1990	32,983		32.3%
2000	37,775		14.5%
2010	43,888		16.2%
2020	45,308		3.2%
U.S. Decennial Census

=== Racial and ethnic composition ===
Sierra Vista city, Arizona – Racial composition Note: the US Census treats Hispanic/Latino as an ethnic category. This table excludes Latinos from the racial categories and assigns them to a separate category. Hispanics/Latinos may be of any race.
Race (NH = Non-Hispanic)	2020	2010	2000	1990	1980
White alone (NH)	56.5% (25,603)	62.8% (27,550)	65.4% (24,720)	71% (23,407)	76.7% (19,119)
Black alone (NH)	7.4% (3,373)	8.3% (3,637)	10.4% (3,943)	11.6% (3,818)	9.5% (2,375)
American Indian alone (NH)	0.5% (248)	0.7% (307)	0.7% (247)	0.5% (180)	0.3% (84)
Asian alone (NH)	4.3% (1,944)	3.9% (1,733)	3.5% (1,317)	5% (1,642)	4.6% (1,150)
Pacific Islander alone (NH)	0.7% (316)	0.6% (260)	0.4% (163)		
Other race alone (NH)	0.7% (329)	0.2% (99)	0.2% (87)	0.2% (52)	0.3% (86)
Multiracial (NH)	6.2% (2,794)	4% (1,775)	3.5% (1,327)	—	—
Hispanic/Latino (any race)	23.6% (10,701)	19.4% (8,527)	15.8% (5,971)	11.8% (3,884)	8.5% (2,123)

=== 2020 census ===
As of the 2020 census, Sierra Vista had a population of 45,308, up from 43,888 at the 2010 census for a growth rate of 3.2% over the decade. Sierra Vista is the largest of seven incorporated cities in Cochise County, accounting for one-third of the county's population.

The median age was 37.6 years. 22.1% of residents were under the age of 18 and 19.8% of residents were 65 years of age or older. For every 100 females there were 98.6 males, and for every 100 females age 18 and over there were 98.8 males age 18 and over.

97.8% of residents lived in urban areas, while 2.2% lived in rural areas.

There were 18,464 households in Sierra Vista, of which 28.3% had children under the age of 18 living in them. Of all households, 46.1% were married-couple households, 19.8% were households with a male householder and no spouse or partner present, and 27.8% were households with a female householder and no spouse or partner present. About 32.7% of all households were made up of individuals and 14.5% had someone living alone who was 65 years of age or older.

There were 20,051 housing units, of which 7.9% were vacant. The homeowner vacancy rate was 2.3% and the rental vacancy rate was 9.6%.

Racial composition as of the 2020 census
Race	Number	Percent
White	28,945	63.9%
Black or African American	3,704	8.2%
American Indian and Alaska Native	442	1.0%
Asian	2,015	4.4%
Native Hawaiian and Other Pacific Islander	350	0.8%
Some other race	3,109	6.9%
Two or more races	6,743	14.9%
Hispanic or Latino (of any race)	10,701	23.6%

=== 2009 estimate ===
Also indicated in the CER 2009 Economic Outlook publication, the Arizona DEC estimates the Sierra Vista Area population is approximately 75,000, which includes outlying areas of the Sierra Vista Southeast Census Designated Place, Huachuca City, Tombstone, Whetstone, Hereford and unincorporated surrounding areas. The population of the Sierra Vista Area is estimated to reach nearly 100,000 by 2028.

=== 2000 census ===
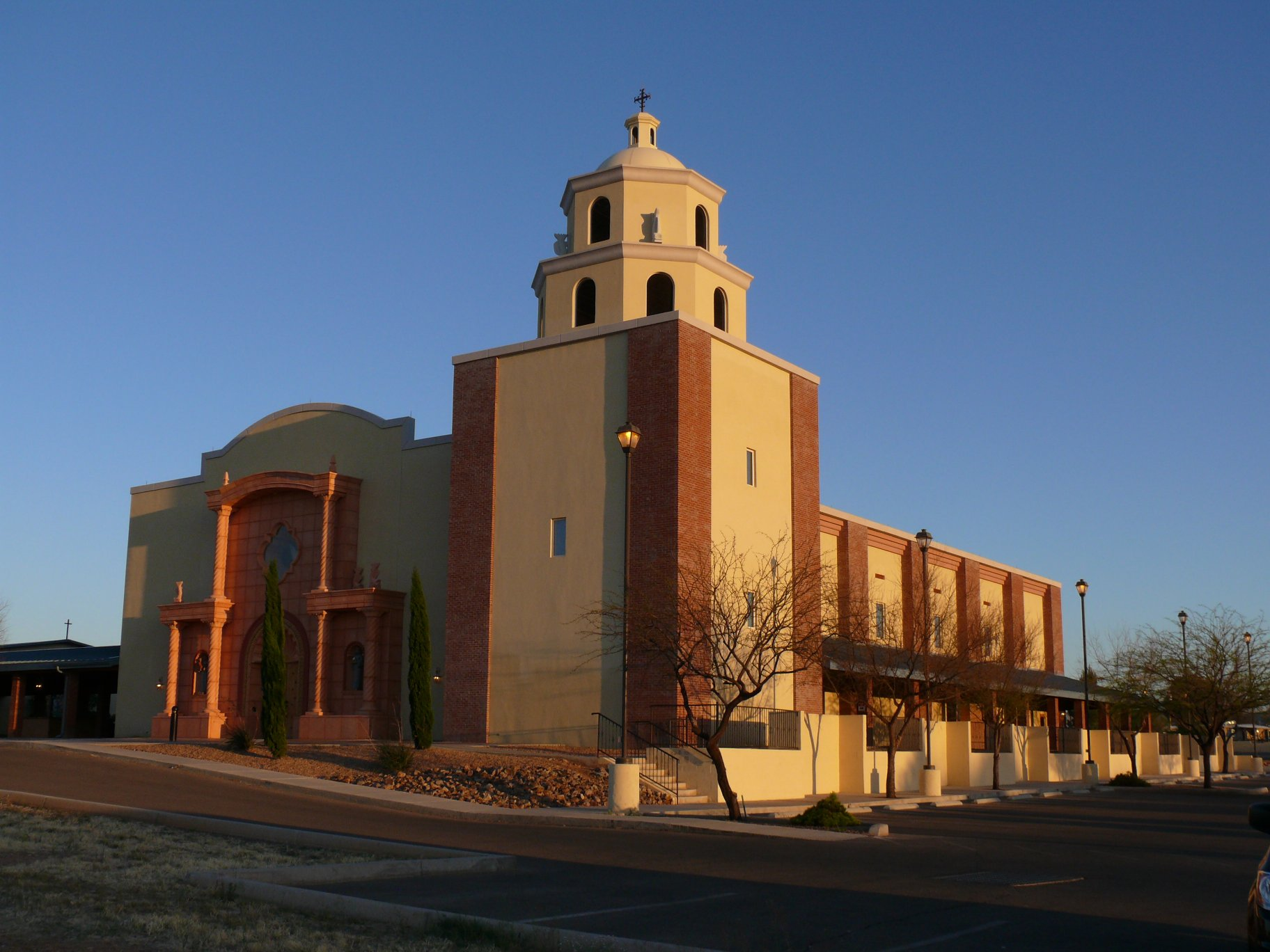
Saint Andrew the Apostle Church

According to the 2000 Census figures, the Sierra Vista population consists of 14,196 households, and 9,993 families residing in the city. The population density was 246.1 inhabitants per square mile (95.0/km^{2}). There were 15,685 housing units at an average density of 102.2 per square mile (39.5/km^{2}). The racial makeup of the city was 73.3% White, 10.9% Black or African American, 3.6% Asian, 0.8% Native American and 0.5% Pacific Islander. 6.1% of the population is from other races, and 4.9% from two or more races. 15.8% of the population is Hispanic or Latino.

There were 14,196 households, out of which 34.9% had children under the age of 18 living with them, 56.5% were married couples living together, 25.1% of all households were made up of individuals, and 7.7% had someone living alone who was 65 years of age or older. The average household size was 2.48 and the average family size was 2.96.

In the city, the age distribution of the population shows 25.8% under the age of 18, 13.0% from 18 to 24, 29.2% from 25 to 44, 19.9% from 45 to 64, and 12.1% who were 65 years of age or older. The median age was 32 years. For every 100 females, there were 100.7 males. For every 100 females age 18 and over, there were 100.7 males.

The median income for a household in the city was $38,427, and the median income for a family was $44,077. Males had a median income of $30,053 versus $23,805 for females. The per capita income for the city was $18,436. About 8.0% of families and 10.5% of the population were below the poverty line, including 15.8% of those under age 18 and 4.0% of those age 65 or over.

As of the 2000 Census, of the population (37,775) 25 years and older 91.5 percent had at least a high school diploma or equivalent and an estimated 25.7 percent held a bachelor's degree or higher. The CER indicates that there has been an increasing trend for residents to attain a bachelor's degree or higher making the local area competitive in today's technological working environment. The estimated population of resident's educated at a post-secondary level (some college credit or more) in Sierra Vista is estimated to be higher than county, state, and national averages.

== Government ==
The City of Sierra Vista is a council-manager municipality. The city council sets public policy while a professional city manager implements policy and oversees the day-to-day operation of the city.

Fort Huachuca, a U.S. Army post, an active and historical military installation and a communications and information technology hub, was annexed into the city in 1971. In addition, the city has been actively working to annex Cochise County enclaves within city limits as outlined in the City Council's strategic plan "Our Future Vistas".

== Economy ==
Sierra Vista is the commercial center for Cochise County and parts of northern Mexico. Many big-box retailers are located in the community along with three major supermarkets and dozens of smaller specialty shops. The Mall at Sierra Vista is a 400,000-square-foot (37,000 m^{2}) mall in Sierra Vista.

Sierra Vista has a substantial employment base due to Fort Huachuca—the community's major employer and primary driving economic force. Because of contracts with the army, the professional, scientific, and technical services sector is unusually large. Nearly half of all jobs in Sierra Vista are government jobs.

Wick Communications, which publishes several dozen newspapers in some twelve states, is headquartered in Sierra Vista.

=== Labor market ===
As of July 2021, Sierra Vista has a civilian labor force of approximately 19,019 people with 18,097 employed. This would make the unemployment rate of Sierra Vista to be 4.8%.

According to the City of Sierra Vista Opportunity Statistics, the largest occupations are:

#	Occupations	Percentage
1	Management, Business, Science, and Arts	39.6%
2	Service	24.7%
3	Sales and Office	23%
4	Production, Transportation, and Material Moving	6.9%
4	Natural Resources, Construction, and Maintenance	5.9%

=== Major Industries ===
Sierra Vista's largest workforce belongs to public administration with Fort Huachuca as the main economic driver. The industries by share of workforce are:

#	Industry	Percentage of Workforce
1	Educational services, and health care and social assistance	21.1%
2	Public administration	20.6%
3	Professional, scientific, and management, and administrative and waste management services	16%
4	Retail trade	10.5%
5	Arts, entertainment, and recreation, and accommodation and food services	10.1%
6	Finance and insurance, and real estate and rental and leasing	4.7%
7	Manufacturing	3.8%
8	Other services, except public administration	3.5%
9	Construction	3.2%
10	Transportation and warehousing, and utilities	2.8%
11	Wholesale trade	1.6%
12	Information	1.6%
13	Agriculture, forestry, fishing and hunting, and mining	0.2%

#	Industry	Sales (2020)
1	Retail	$568,506,425
2	Restaurant & Bar	$90,232,282
3	Lodging	$13,808,575

== Education ==
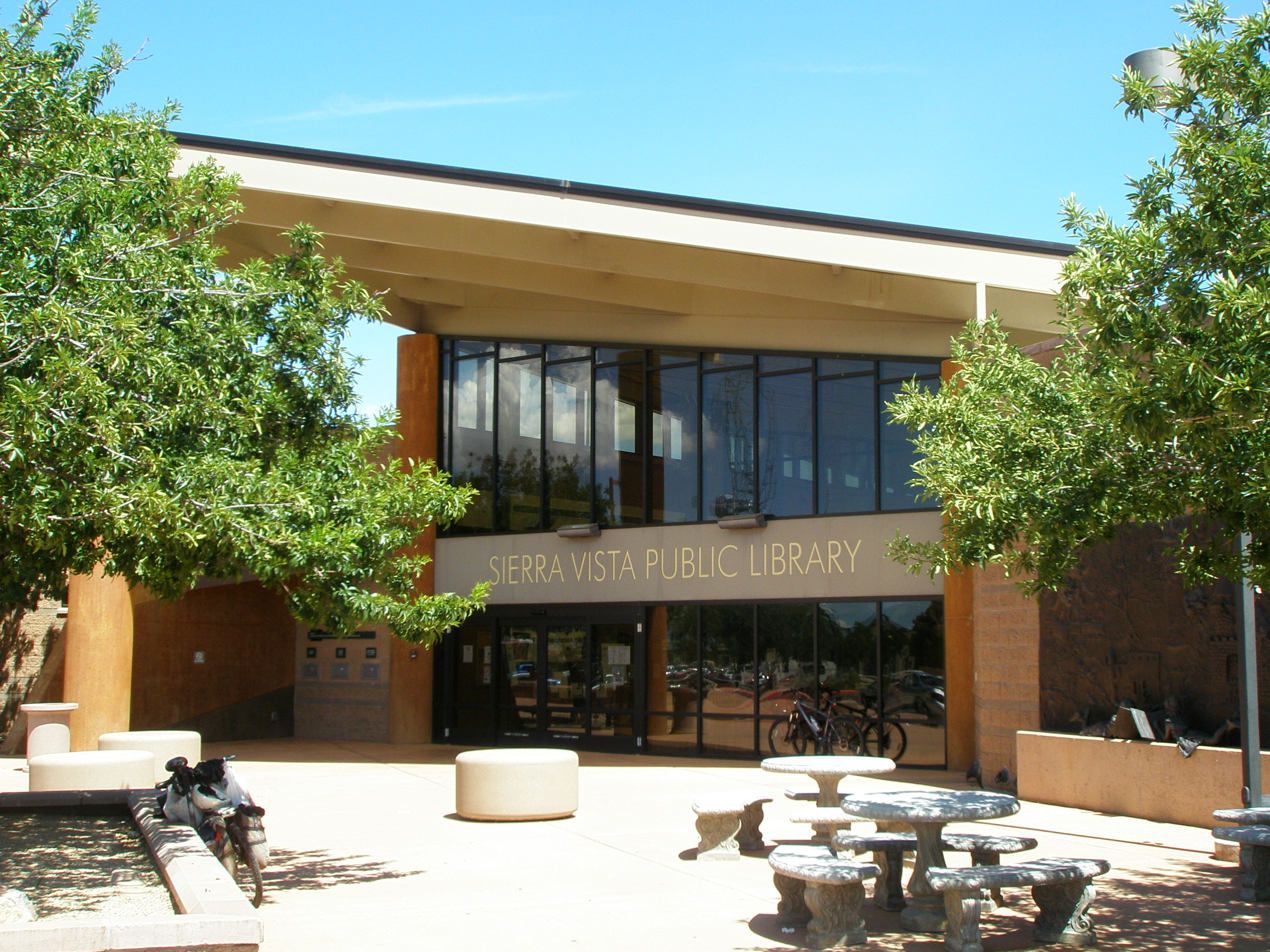
Sierra Vista Public Library

The Sierra Vista Unified School District includes one high school, Buena High School, one middle school, and six elementary schools. There are also several charter and private education opportunities. Higher education is available through the University of Arizona, College of Applied Science & Technology and Cochise Community College.

There is a 31,000-square-foot (2,900 m^{2}) public library in the city across from city hall.

== Culture ==
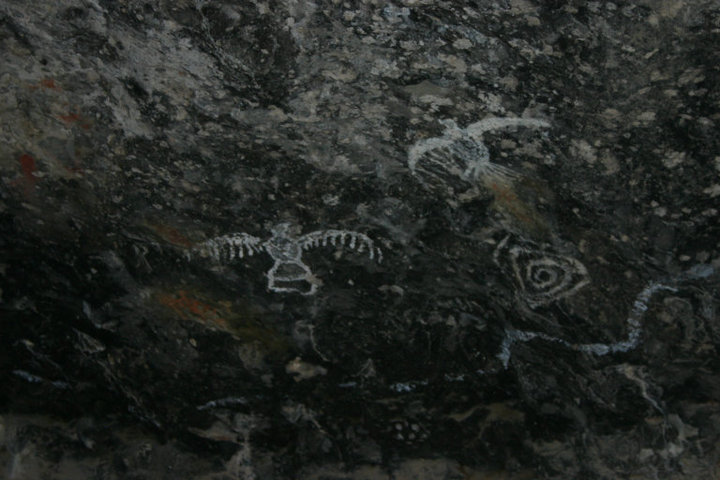
Pictographs in the Huachuca Mountains

Sierra Vista has a variety of cultural and family-oriented activities throughout the year. Some of the major events include the Cochise Cowboy Poetry and Music Gathering in February, the Festival of the Southwest in the spring, Independence Day celebration, the Southwest Wings Festival in August for bird watching enthusiasts, and Arizona's longest-running holiday parade in December. During the winter months, the Sierra Vista Symphony Orchestra presents three concerts of classical and popular music, including pre-concert seminars, and puts on special fund raising events. Throughout the year, the Art Discovery Series presents plays, concerts, and musicals, and in the summer, there are regular band concerts at Veterans' Park, as well as many activities at the Sierra Vista Public Library such as a film series, lectures, readings, and other programs for children and adults. Pictographs created by Native Americans can be found in certain areas of the Huachuca Mountains.

The Gray Hawk Nature Center offering nature education programs and housing live reptile and invertebrate exhibits is located nearby on the San Pedro River.

== Media ==
Sierra Vista is served by the Sierra Vista Herald since 1955.

In 2016, a Social Network Based News Agency was started called Sierra Vista News Network or SVNN. The Facebook page and other Networks SVNN operates include political coverage, Live Streamed High School Sports, and on demand Live News Coverage.

KWBA-TV (channel 58) is an independent television station licensed to Sierra Vista and serves the Tucson/Sierra Vista market. The station has broadcast since 1996 and was an affiliate of The CW network from 2006 to 2024. The station's transmission tower is located in the Santa Rita Mountains between Sierra Vista and Tucson. Other area television stations include KFTU-DT, channel 36, the Spanish-language UniMás affiliate, licensed to Douglas with a broadcast tower in the Mule Mountains near Sierra Vista; and community station K33CG, channel 33, a former TBN affiliate.

Radio station KZMK (K-101) serves as a Top 40 hits FM radio station covering Sierra Vista and most of Cochise County. The station provides live broadcasts for significant events occurring in and around the city. Sister radio station KTAN (1420 AM) broadcasts a News Talk Information format. Both stations are owned by CCR-Sierra Vista IV, LLC., which also owns nearby Bisbee, Arizona radio station KWCD (92.3 FM), which broadcasts a country music format.

Radio station KWRB (formerly "The Spark") serves as a Christian FM radio station covering Bisbee and most of Cochise County, on the 90.9 MHz frequency. They also have an alternative station that serves Willcox, which repeats the station using the callsign K274CB, on 102.7 MHz frequency. Both radio stations are owned by World Radio Network, Inc.

== Sports teams and events ==
The Cochise County Cavaliers have combined with the Bisbee Ironmen, both former members of the Arizona Football League (AzFL), to form the Cochise County Ironmen. The Ironmen began their first season of play in 2011.

== Healthcare ==
Canyon Vista Medical Center (CVMC) and the Raymond W. Bliss Army Health Center (located on nearby Fort Huachuca) serve the community's health care needs. Medical personnel of all major specialties are available in the area. Canyon Vista Medical Center was recently completed adjoining an existing Ambulatory Surgery and Imaging Center on SR 90. A management agreement for long term operations of the hospital was signed with RegionalCare Hospital Partners. The US Department of Veterans Affairs opened a clinic in Sierra Vista to better serve the area's large retired military population.

=== Regional health concerns ===
Residents and health professionals became concerned after observing an elevated number of leukemia and related childhood cancer cases being reported in Sierra Vista since 1995. In 2001, with seven reported cases since 1995, the Arizona Department of Health Services (ADHS) determined the number of cases was statistically elevated over the expected norm. In response, the ADHS launched an environmental review of air, drinking water and soil in the Sierra Vista area to determine if environmental exposure had placed residents at greater risk of childhood leukemia or other cancers. By October 2002, the ADHS in conjunction with the Arizona Cancer Registry, determined that, "No common environmental exposure from drinking water, ambient air or waste sites were identified that might have placed residents of the Sierra Vista area at greater risk of developing leukemia." No further action was recommended at that time.

In 2003, three more cases of leukemia were reported. The Centers for Disease Control (CDC) was hesitant to investigate in depth, initially leaving the matter to state health departments, but became involved after the ADHS requested their assistance in the spring of 2003. The CDC concluded two formal studies, in 2004 and 2006, with mixed results. They did not discover any environmental causes for the increased incidence of leukemia, but they did note that they only tested four children with leukemia. They cautioned that with such a small number of study participants, "any attempt to measure associations between environmental exposure and disease would be inherently suspect and not statistically appropriate." Biological samples were tested for 128 chemicals, with results showing average or below average levels for all chemicals except tungsten, styrene and PCB-52, which were above average.

There were no more reported cases in the several years following the CDC reports, bringing the occurrence statistics back in line with national averages. However, with a total of thirteen children diagnosed and another five potentially linked cases being investigated since 1995, some people still have concerns.

== Transportation ==
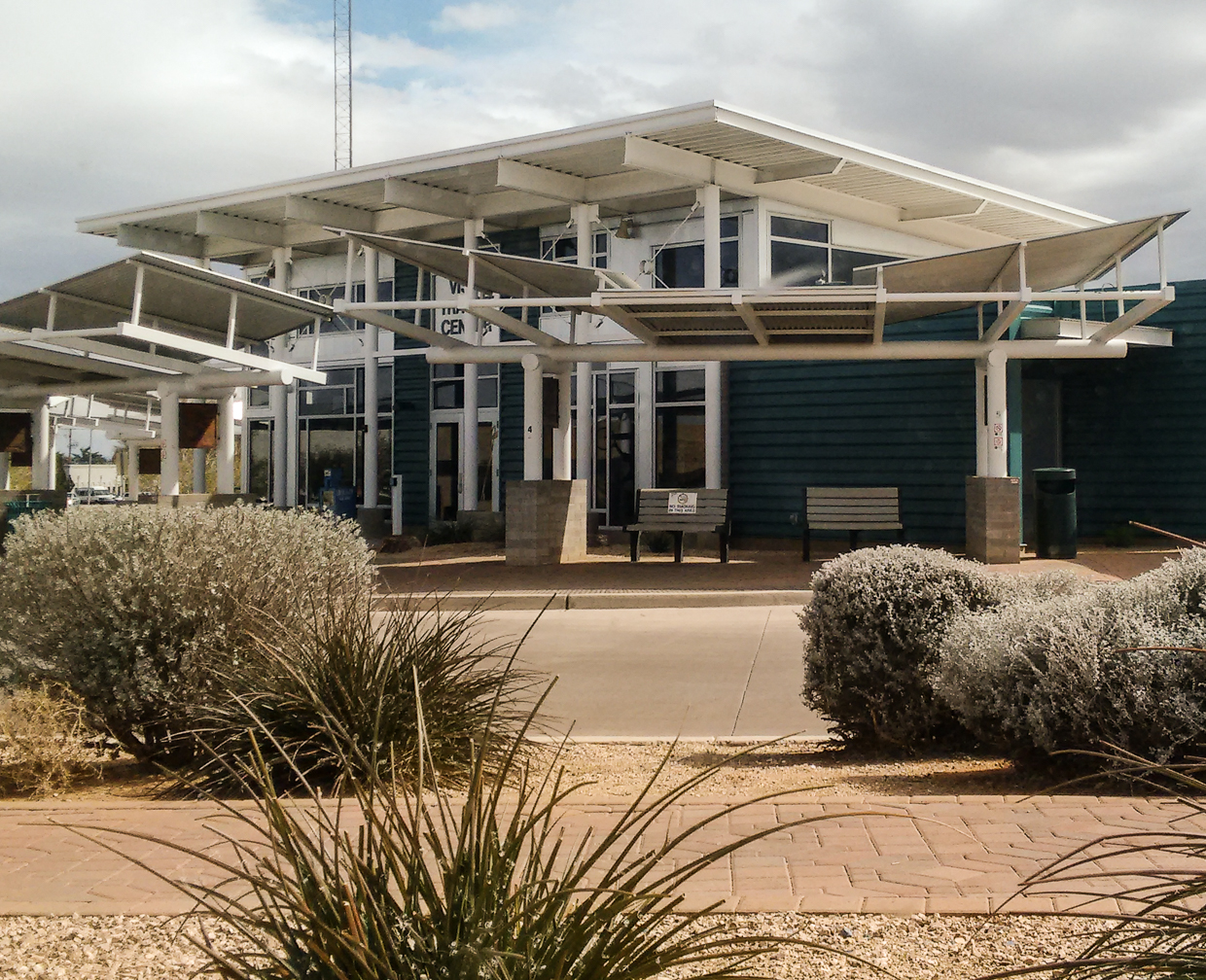
Vista Transit Building

Sierra Vista is supported by a public mass transit system called Vista Transit, operated by the city. Huachuca City Transit operates between Huachuca City and Sierra Vista. Cochise Connection runs between Douglas, Bisbee, and Sierra Vista.

There are two highways (SR 90 and SR 92) connecting Sierra Vista with neighboring communities. The city is also served by the Sierra Vista Municipal Airport (FHU) which is jointly operated by the U.S. Army as Libby Army Airfield. There are no commercial flights arriving to or departing from FHU.

=== Major highways ===
- State Route 90
- State Route 92

== Sister cities ==
Sierra Vista established its Sister Cities program in 1989 with Resolution 2282 in order to promote a relationship with Cananea. Sierra Vista was later twinned with Radebeul on May 22, 1998, by Resolution 3956. Sierra Vista and Radebeul have a foreign exchange program with each other.

- Cananea, Sonora, Mexico
- Radebeul, Saxony, Germany

== Picture gallery ==
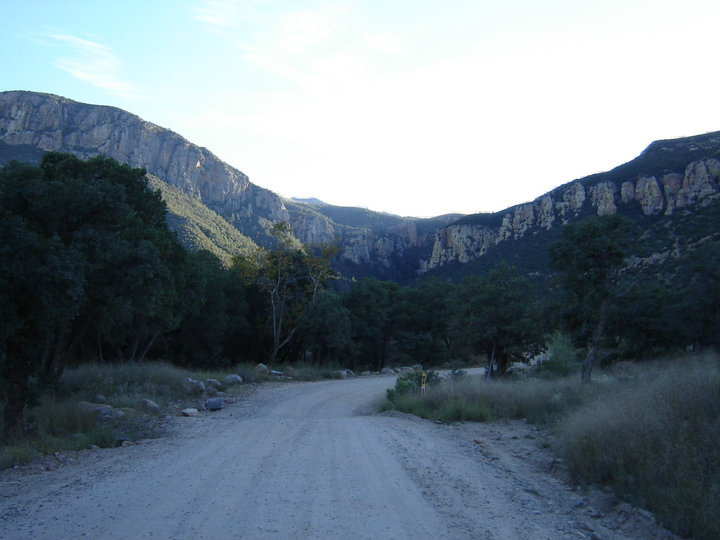
Carr Canyon in the Huachuca Mountains

Ramsey Canyon

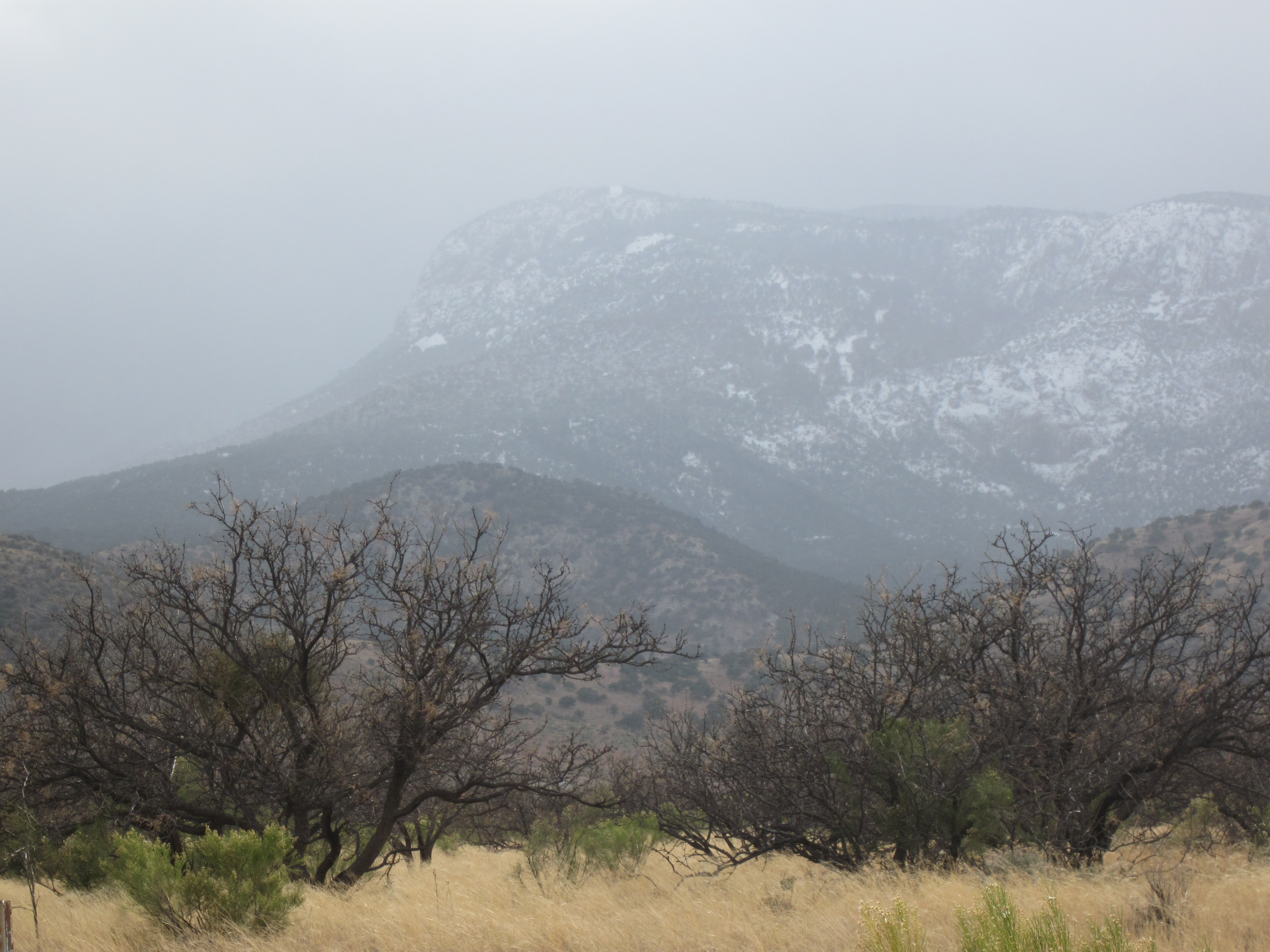
Snow-capped mountains outside Sierra Vista
