= List of school districts in Arizona =

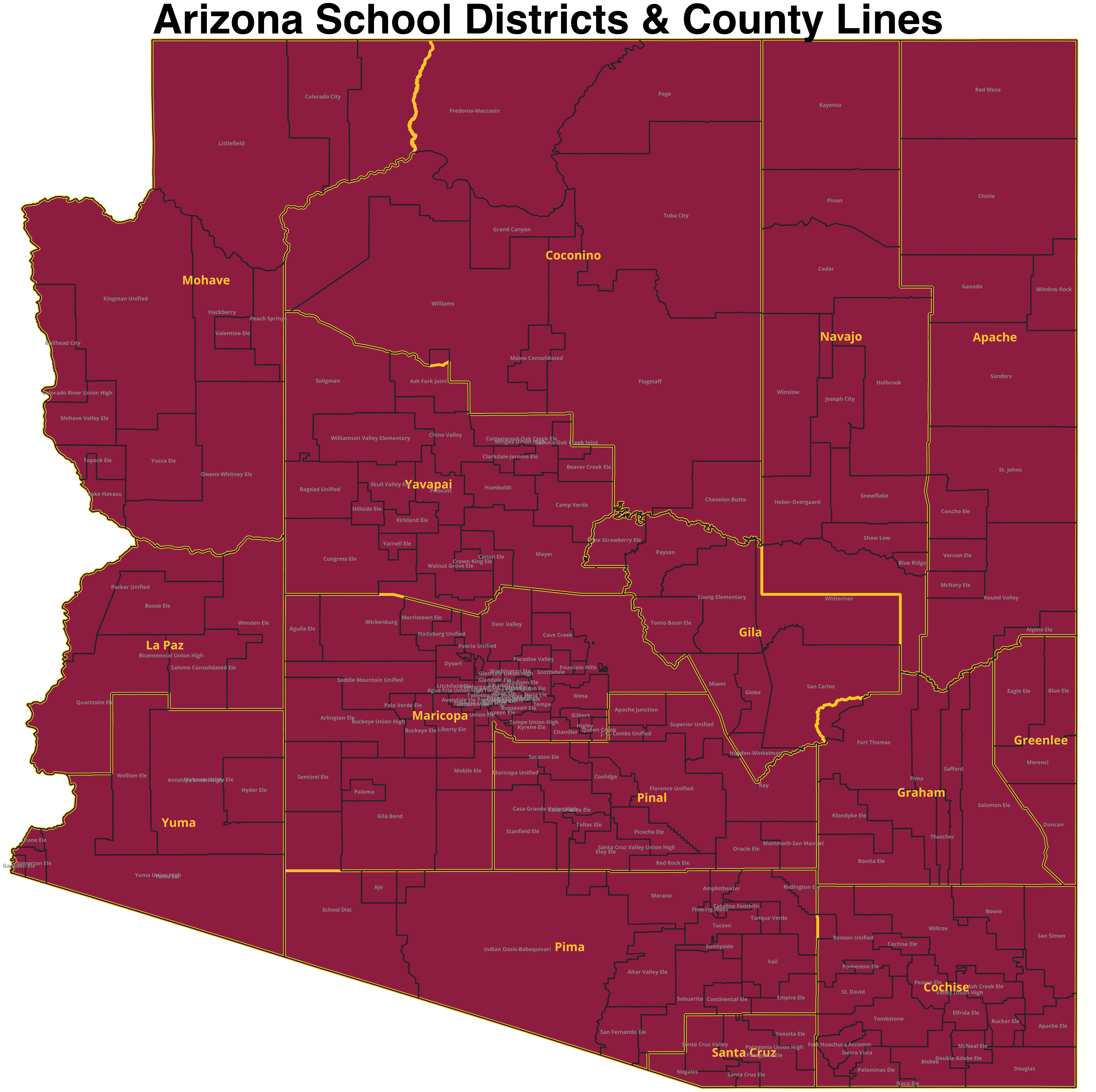
Arizona School Districts

This is a list of school districts in Arizona. It is divided by county.

Arizona school districts are independent governmental entities as classified by the U.S. Census Bureau. There are some places that are not in boundaries of school districts and/or are on military bases. Those are under the jurisdiction of the respective county superintendent of schools, and the U.S. Census Bureau does not count them as separate governments. Additionally there are county special education cooperatives for gifted children that are not counted as separate governments.

== Apache County ==
- Alpine Elementary School District #7
- Chinle Unified School District #24
- Concho Elementary School District #6
- Ganado Unified School District #20
- McNary Elementary School District #23
- Red Mesa Unified School District #27
- Round Valley Unified School District #10
- Saint Johns Unified School District #1
- Sanders Unified School District #18
- Vernon Elementary School District #9
- Window Rock Unified School District #8

== Cochise County ==
- Apache Elementary School District #42
- Ash Creek Elementary School District #53
- Benson Unified School District #9
- Bisbee Unified School District #2
- Bowie Unified School District #14
- Cochise County Accommodation School District #01-01
- Cochise Elementary School District #26
- Cochise Technology District #1
- Double Adobe Elementary School District #45
- Douglas Unified School District #27
- Elfrida Elementary School District #12
- Fort Huachuca Accommodation School District #00
- McNeal Elementary School District #55
- Naco Elementary School District #23
- Palominas Elementary School District #49
- Pearce Elementary School District #22
- Pomerene Elementary School District #64
- San Simon Unified School District #18
- Sierra Vista Unified School District #68
- St. David Unified School District #21
- Tombstone Unified School District #1
- Valley Union High School District #22
- Willcox Unified School District #13

== Coconino County ==
- Chevelon Butte School District #5
- Coconino Association for Vocations, Industry and Technology #1
- Coconino County Regional Accommodation School District #99
- Flagstaff Unified School District #1
- Fredonia-Moccasin Unified School District #6
- Grand Canyon Unified School District #4
- Maine Consolidated Elementary School District #10
- Page Unified School District #8
- Tuba City Unified School District #15
- Williams Unified School District #2

== Gila County ==
- Gila County Regional School District #49
- Globe Unified School District #1
- Hayden-Winkelman Unified School District #41
- Miami Unified School District #40
- Payson Unified School District #10
- Pine-Strawberry Elementary School District #12
- San Carlos Unified School District #20
- Tonto Basin Elementary School District #33
- Young Elementary School District #5

== Graham County ==
- Bonita Elementary School District #16
- Fort Thomas Unified School District #7
- Gila Institute for Technology #02
- Graham County Special Services #99
- Klondyke School District #9
- Pima Unified School District #6
- Safford Unified School District #1
- Solomon Elementary School District #5
- Thatcher Unified School District #4

== Greenlee County ==
- Blue Elementary School District #22
- Duncan Unified School District #2
- Morenci Unified School District #18

== La Paz County ==
- Bicentennial Union High School District #76
- Bouse Elementary School District #26
- Parker Unified School District #27
- Quartzsite Elementary School District #4
- Salome Elementary School District #30
- Wenden Elementary School District #19

== Maricopa County ==
- Agua Fria Union High School District #216
- Aguila Elementary School District #63
- Alhambra Elementary School District #68
- Arlington Elementary School District #47
- Avondale Elementary School District #44
- Balsz Elementary School District #31
- Buckeye Elementary School District #33
- Buckeye Union High School District #201
- Cartwright Elementary School District #83
- Cave Creek Unified School District #93
- Chandler Unified School District #80
- Creighton Elementary School District #14
- Deer Valley Unified School District #97
- Dysart Unified School District #89
- East Valley Institute of Technology #1
- Fountain Hills Unified School District #98
- Fowler Elementary School District #45
- Gila Bend Unified School District #24
- Gilbert Unified School District #41
- Glendale Elementary School District #40
- Glendale Union High School District #205
- Higley Unified School District #60
- Isaac School District #5
- Kyrene School District #28
- Laveen Elementary School District #59
- Liberty Elementary School District #25
- Litchfield Elementary School District #79
- Littleton Elementary School District #65
- Madison Elementary School District #38
- Maricopa County Regional District #509
- Mesa Public Schools #4
- Mobile Elementary School District #86
- Morristown Elementary School District #75
- Murphy Elementary School District #21
- Nadaburg Unified School District #81
- Osborn Elementary School District #8
- Palo Verde Elementary School District #49
- Paloma Elementary School District #94
- Paradise Valley Unified School District #69
- Pendergast Elementary School District #92
- Peoria Unified School District #11
- Phoenix Elementary School District #1
- Phoenix Union High School District #210
- Queen Creek Unified School District #95
- Riverside Elementary School District #2
- Roosevelt Elementary School District #66
- Saddle Mountain Unified School District #90
- Scottsdale Unified School District #48
- Sentinel Elementary School District #71
- Tempe Elementary School District #3
- Tempe Union High School District #213
- Tolleson Elementary School District #17
- Tolleson Union High School District #214
- Union Elementary School District #62
- Washington Elementary School District #6
- Western Maricopa Education Center (West-MEC) #402
- Wickenburg Unified School District #9
- Wilson Elementary School District #7

== Mohave County ==
- Bullhead City Elementary School District #15
- Colorado City Unified School District #14
- Colorado River Union High School District #2
- Hackberry School District #3
- Kingman Unified School District #20
- Lake Havasu Unified School District #1
- Littlefield Unified School District #9
- Mohave Valley Elementary School District #16
- Owens-Whitney Elementary School District #6
- Peach Springs Unified School District #8
- Topock Elementary School District #12
- Valentine Elementary School District #22
- Western Arizona Vocational Education #50
- Yucca Elementary School District #13

== Navajo County ==
- Blue Ridge Unified School District #32
- Cedar Unified School District #25
- Heber-Overgaard Unified School District #6
- Holbrook Unified School District #3
- Joseph City Unified School District #2
- Kayenta Unified School District #27
- Navajo County Accommodation District #99
- Northeast Arizona Technological Institute of Vocational Education #36
- Northern Arizona Vocational Institute of Technology #35
- Piñon Unified School District #4
- Show Low Unified School District #10
- Snowflake Unified School District #5
- Whiteriver Unified School District #20
- Winslow Unified School District #1

== Pima County ==
- Ajo Unified School District #15
- Altar Valley Elementary School District #51
- Amphitheater Unified School District #10
- Baboquivari Unified School District #40
- Catalina Foothills Unified School District #16
- Continental Elementary School District #39
- Empire Elementary School District #37
- Flowing Wells Unified School District #8
- Marana Unified School District #6
- Pima Accommodation District
- Pima County Joint Technical Education District #11
- Redington Elementary School District #44
- Sahuarita Unified School District #30
- San Fernando Elementary School District #35
- Sunnyside Unified School District #12
- Tanque Verde Unified School District #13
- Tucson Unified School District #1
- Vail Unified School District #20

== Pinal County ==
- Apache Junction Unified School District #43
- Casa Grande Elementary School District #4
- Casa Grande Union High School District #82
- Central Arizona Valley Institute of Technology #1
- Cobre Valley Institute of Technology #2
- Coolidge Unified School District #21
- Eloy Elementary School District #11
- Florence Unified School District #1
- J. O. Combs Unified School District #44
- Mammoth-San Manuel Unified School District #8
- Maricopa Unified School District #20
- Mary C. O'Brien Accommodation School District
- Oracle Elementary School District #2
- Picacho Elementary School District #33
- Ray Unified School District #3
- Red Rock Elementary School District #5
- Sacaton Elementary School District #18
- Santa Cruz Valley Union High School District #840
- Stanfield Elementary School District #24
- Superior Unified School District #15
- Toltec Elementary School District #22

== Santa Cruz County ==
- Nogales Unified School District #1
- Patagonia Elementary School District #6
- Patagonia Union High School District #20
- Santa Cruz Elementary School District #28
- Santa Cruz Valley Unified School District #35
- Sonoita Elementary School District #25

== Yavapai County ==
- Ash Fork Joint Unified School District #31
- Bagdad Unified School District #20
- Beaver Creek School District #26
- Camp Verde Unified School District #28
- Canon Elementary School District #50
- Chino Valley Unified School District #51
- Clarkdale-Jerome Elementary School District #3
- Congress Elementary School District #17
- Cottonwood-Oak Creek Elementary School District #6
- Crown King Elementary School District #41
- Hillside Elementary School District #35
- Humboldt Unified School District #22
- Kirkland Elementary School District #23
- Mayer Unified School District #43
- Mingus Union High School District #4
- Mountain Institute Joint Technological Education District #2
- Prescott Unified School District #1
- Sedona-Oak Creek Joint Unified School District #9
- Seligman Unified School District #40
- Skull Valley Elementary School District #15
- Valley Academy for Career and Technology Education #1
- Williamson Valley Elementary School District #2
- Yarnell Elementary School District #52
- Yavapai Accommodation School District #99

== Yuma County ==
- Antelope Union High School District #50
- Crane Elementary School District #13
- Gadsden Elementary School District #32
- Hyder Elementary School District #16
- Mohawk Valley Elementary School District #17
- Somerton Elementary School District #11
- Southwest Technical Education District of Yuma
- Wellton Elementary School District #24
- Yuma Elementary School District #1
- Yuma Union High School District #70
