= Cochise Technology District =

School district in Cochise County, Arizona

Coordinates: 31°52′50″N 109°45′13″W

Address
- 6506 East Mills Maerker Rod WILLCOX, Arizona, 85643; United States

District information
- Type: Public
- Grades: 9–12
- NCES District ID: 0400345

Students and staff
- Students: 7
- Teachers: 1.36
- Staff: 3.12
- Student–teacher ratio: 5.15

Other information
- Website: www.cochisejted.org

Cochise Technology District is a school district in Cochise County, Arizona. It is the county's only joint technological education district, serving eight high school districts. CTD was founded in 2001 with seven of the eight high schools on board; Douglas joined in 2004.

== Member school districts ==
- Benson Unified School District
- Bowie Unified School District
- Douglas Unified School District
- San Simon Unified School District
- St. David Unified School District
- Tombstone Unified School District
- Valley Union High School District
- Willcox Unified School District
