= Pomerene =

Pomerene may refer to:

== People ==
- Atlee Pomerene (1863–1937), American politician
- James H. Pomerene (1920–2008), American engineer

== Place names ==
- Pomerene, Arizona

== Other uses ==
- Pomerene Elementary School District
- Pomerene House
- Webb–Pomerene Act

== See also ==
- Pomer (disambiguation)
