= Elfrida, Arizona =

CDP in Cochise County, Arizona

- Census-designated place
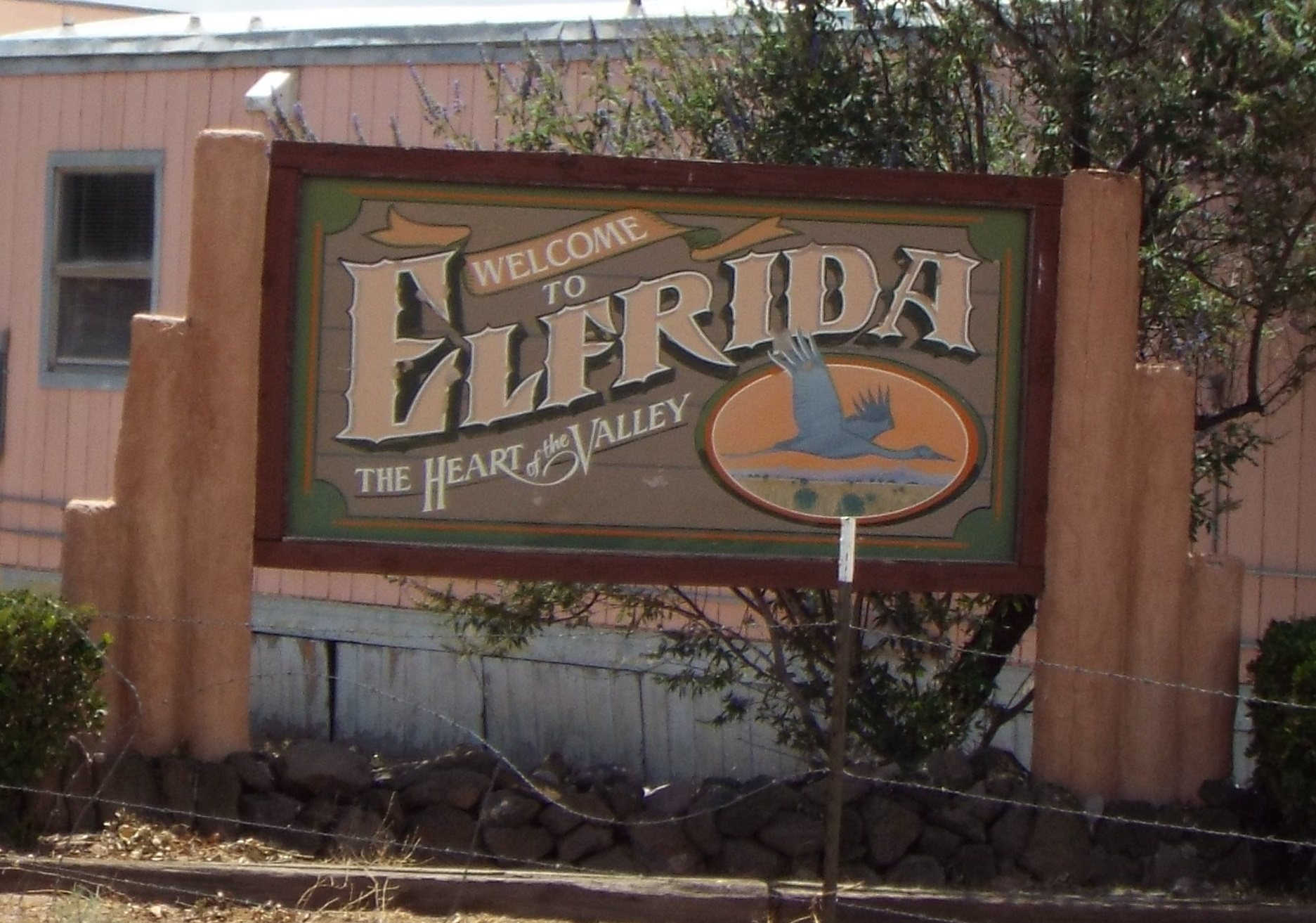
- Welcome to Elfrida

- Location in the United States Elfrida (the United States)
- Coordinates: 31°41′07″N 109°41′13″W
- Country: United States
- State: Arizona
- County: Cochise

Area
  - Total: 6.07 sq mi (15.71 km^{2})
  - Land: 6.07 sq mi (15.71 km^{2})
  - Water: 0 sq mi (0.00 km^{2})

Population (2020)
  - Total: 421
  - Density: 69/sq mi (26.8/km^{2})
- FIPS code: 04-22080
- GNIS feature ID: 2582781

Elfrida is a census-designated place in Cochise County, Arizona, United States. As of the 2020 census, it had a population of 421.

== Description ==
Elfrida is located on U.S. Route 191, 27 miles (43 km) northwest of Douglas and 6 miles (10 km) north of McNeal. Elfrida has the United States Postal Service Zip Code of 85610.

Elfrida is home to Valley Union High School grades 9–12 and Elfrida Elementary School grades K–8.

Chiricahua Community Health Centers was founded in Elfrida in 1986.

Elfrida Community Center is north of the center crossroads.

Elfrida gained a library, circa March 2000. The Elfrida Library is part of the Cochise County Library District.

The Elfrida Fire Department is south of the center crossroads.

== Demographics ==
Historical population
| Census | Pop. | Note | %± |
|---|---|---|---|
| 2010 | 459 | | — |
| 2020 | 421 | | −8.3% |
U.S. Decennial Census

== Climate ==
According to the Köppen Climate Classification system, Elfrida has a semi-arid climate, abbreviated "BSk" on climate maps.

== See also ==
- List of census-designated places in Arizona
