= San Simon, Arizona =

Census-designated place in Cochise County, Arizona, United States

- Census-designated place
- Location of San Simon in Cochise County, Arizona.
- Coordinates: 32°16′05″N 109°13′49″W
- Country: United States
- State: Arizona
- County: Cochise

Area
  - Total: 0.76 sq mi (1.98 km^{2})
  - Land: 0.76 sq mi (1.98 km^{2})
  - Water: 0 sq mi (0.00 km^{2})
- Elevation: 3,622 ft (1,104 m)

Population (2020)
  - Total: 158
  - Density: 206.9/sq mi (79.87/km^{2})
- Time zone: UTC-7 (Mountain (MST))
- ZIP code: 85632
- Area code: 520
- GNIS feature ID: 2582861

San Simon is a census-designated place (CDP) in Cochise County, Arizona, United States. As of the 2020 census, it had a population of 158. San Simon is located along Interstate 10, 40 miles (64 km) east of Willcox. The community has a ZIP code of 85632.

== History ==
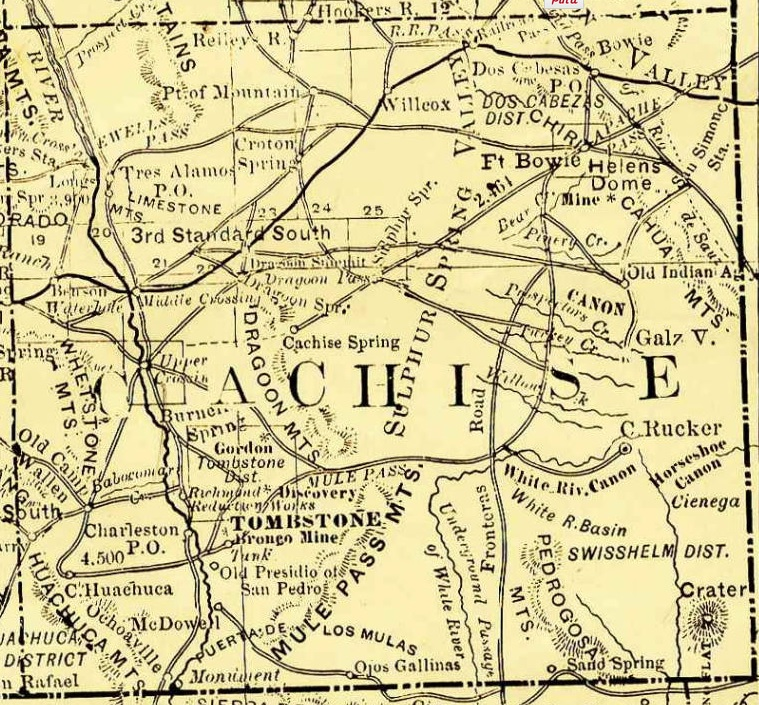
San Simon Sta. appears in upper right quadrant of 1881 map of Cochise County.

San Simon was the location of the San Simon Station of the Butterfield Overland Mail on the San Simon River between Apache Pass and Stein's Peak Stations. It was a later relay station established to provide water and change horses on the route.

In September 1880, Southern Pacific's rail line construction from the west reached San Simon and started rail service. Once a junction was made in March 1881 with eastern rails in Deming, New Mexico, the line became the second transcontinental rail route across the United States. San Simon was within Pima County until Cochise County was formed out of the eastern half of Pima in February 1881.

== San Simon School ==
The San Simon School is the K-12 school in San Simon, Arizona. It is the only school in the San Simon Unified School District. Its high school enrollment of 40 students makes it the second-smallest high school currently in the Arizona Interscholastic Association, only ahead of nearby Bowie High School. San Simon School as a district was rated No. 1 Arizona school for 2011, according to the Arizona Department of Education. The school received an A rating for 2012.

== Demographics ==
Historical population
Census	Pop.	Note	%±
2010	165		—
2020	158		−4.2%
U.S. Decennial Census

As of the census of 2010, there were 165 people and 127 housing units in the CDP. The CDP was a new CDP created in the 2010 census. The population density was 237.5 people per square mile. Prior to the 2010 census, the San Simon area was only a part of the much larger Bowie CCD for census purposes.

== Climate ==
Climate occurs primarily on the outside of true deserts in low-latitude semiarid steppe regions. The Köppen Climate Classification subtype for this climate is BSk (Tropical and Subtropical Steppe Climate).

Climate data for San Simon, Arizona (1991–2020 normals, extremes 1903–1908, 1913–1916, 1939–1962, 1987–present)
Month	Jan	Feb	Mar	Apr	May	Jun	Jul	Aug	Sep	Oct	Nov	Dec	Year
Record high °F (°C)	82 (28)	88 (31)	92 (33)	99 (37)	108 (42)	114 (46)	111 (44)	108 (42)	105 (41)	99 (37)	88 (31)	80 (27)	114 (46)
Mean maximum °F (°C)	72.1 (22.3)	77.8 (25.4)	85.1 (29.5)	92.0 (33.3)	99.6 (37.6)	106.3 (41.3)	105.7 (40.9)	102.8 (39.3)	99.3 (37.4)	93.9 (34.4)	82.2 (27.9)	72.9 (22.7)	107.7 (42.1)
Mean daily maximum °F (°C)	60.7 (15.9)	66.0 (18.9)	73.5 (23.1)	81.3 (27.4)	90.4 (32.4)	99.0 (37.2)	98.1 (36.7)	95.8 (35.4)	91.5 (33.1)	82.7 (28.2)	70.0 (21.1)	60.0 (15.6)	80.8 (27.1)
Daily mean °F (°C)	44.2 (6.8)	48.4 (9.1)	54.6 (12.6)	61.2 (16.2)	69.6 (20.9)	78.7 (25.9)	82.0 (27.8)	80.3 (26.8)	75.1 (23.9)	64.2 (17.9)	52.2 (11.2)	44.0 (6.7)	62.9 (17.2)
Mean daily minimum °F (°C)	27.6 (−2.4)	30.8 (−0.7)	35.7 (2.1)	41.2 (5.1)	48.8 (9.3)	58.5 (14.7)	65.9 (18.8)	64.8 (18.2)	58.7 (14.8)	45.7 (7.6)	34.3 (1.3)	28.1 (−2.2)	45.0 (7.2)
Mean minimum °F (°C)	16.1 (−8.8)	19.1 (−7.2)	23.0 (−5.0)	27.8 (−2.3)	36.4 (2.4)	46.8 (8.2)	57.3 (14.1)	57.5 (14.2)	47.7 (8.7)	31.6 (−0.2)	20.1 (−6.6)	15.4 (−9.2)	12.4 (−10.9)
Record low °F (°C)	−5 (−21)	0 (−18)	9 (−13)	10 (−12)	24 (−4)	32 (0)	45 (7)	47 (8)	36 (2)	18 (−8)	10 (−12)	5 (−15)	−5 (−21)
Average precipitation inches (mm)	0.92 (23)	0.79 (20)	0.48 (12)	0.24 (6.1)	0.12 (3.0)	0.44 (11)	2.19 (56)	1.92 (49)	0.90 (23)	0.76 (19)	0.55 (14)	1.00 (25)	10.31 (262)
Average snowfall inches (cm)	0.5 (1.3)	0.2 (0.51)	0.0 (0.0)	0.0 (0.0)	0.0 (0.0)	0.0 (0.0)	0.0 (0.0)	0.0 (0.0)	0.0 (0.0)	0.0 (0.0)	0.2 (0.51)	0.3 (0.76)	1.2 (3.0)
Average precipitation days (≥ 0.01 inch)	2.8	3.3	2.5	0.9	0.4	1.3	5.3	5.7	3.2	2.1	2.1	3.0	32.6
Average snowy days (≥ 0.1 inch)	0.0	0.0	0.0	0.0	0.0	0.0	0.0	0.0	0.0	0.0	0.1	0.2	0.3
Source: NOAA

== See also ==
- List of census-designated places in Arizona
