= Willcox High School =

Location
- 240 N. Bisbee Avenue; Willcox, Arizona 85643; United States
- Coordinates: 32.2562°N 109.8421°W

Information
- School type: Public high school
- School district: Willcox Unified School District
- CEEB code: 030550
- Principal: Tammy Hall
- Teaching staff: 23.79 (FTE)
- Grades: 9-12
- Enrollment: 406 (2023–2024)
- Student to teacher ratio: 17.07
- Colors: Red and white
- Mascot: Cowboy
- Website: whs.wusd13.org

Willcox High School is a high school in Willcox, Arizona. It is part of the Willcox Unified School District.

== Fire ==
Overnight on January 12, 2011, a fire destroyed a classroom building at Willcox High, which represented half the school. The building on the combined middle school/high school campus housed a lab and several other classrooms. Classes were canceled for the remainder of the week. Most of the school's textbooks were destroyed in the fire.

Upon this, students in the Vail School District, first from Empire High School then from the whole district, sent a shipment of copy paper.
