= Cochise County, Arizona =

County in Arizona, United States

- County
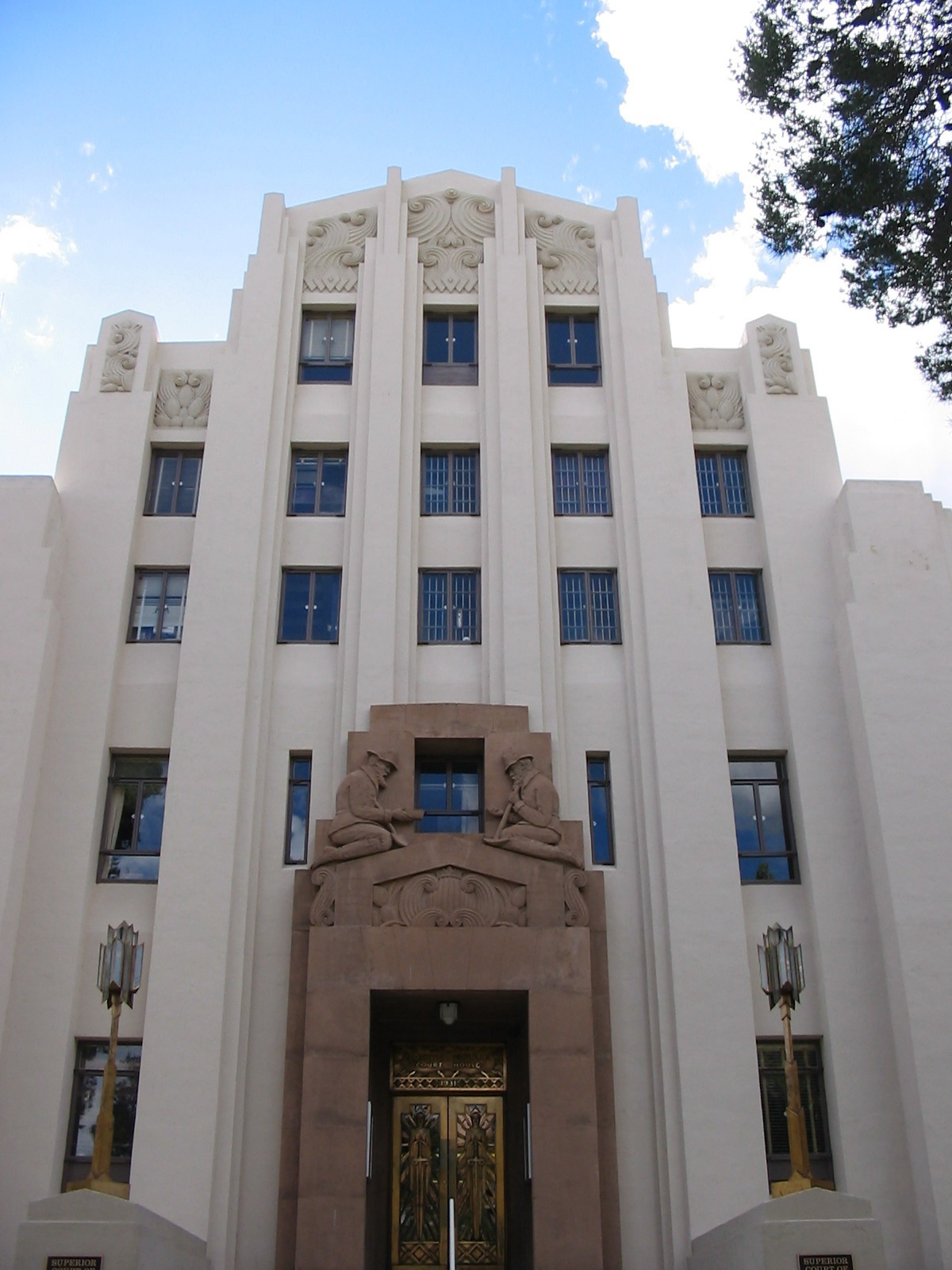
- The art deco county courthouse in Bisbee

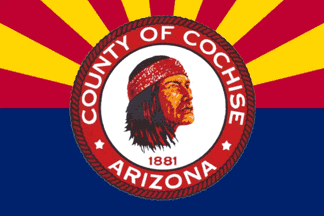
- Flag Seal

- Location within the U.S. state of Arizona
- Coordinates: 31°52′N 109°45′W
- Country: United States
- State: Arizona
- Founded: February 1, 1881
- Named for: Cochise
- Seat: Bisbee
- Largest city: Sierra Vista

Area
  - Total: 6,219 sq mi (16,110 km^{2})
  - Land: 6,166 sq mi (15,970 km^{2})
  - Water: 53 sq mi (140 km^{2}) 0.9%

Population (2020)
  - Total: 125,447
  - Estimate (2025): 126,332 ▲
  - Density: 20.34/sq mi (7.855/km^{2})
- Time zone: UTC−7 (Mountain)
- Congressional districts: 6th, 7th
- Website: www.cochise.az.gov

Cochise County (/koʊˈtʃiːs/ koh-CHEESS) is a county in the southeastern corner of the U.S. state of Arizona. It is named after Cochise, a Chiricahua Apache, who was a key war leader during the Apache Wars.

Its population was 125,447 at the 2020 census. The county seat is Bisbee and the most populous city is Sierra Vista.

Cochise County includes the Sierra Vista–Douglas, Arizona metropolitan statistical area. The county borders southwestern New Mexico and the northwestern Mexican state of Sonora.

== History ==
In 1528, Spanish explorers Álvar Núñez Cabeza de Vaca, Estevanico, and Fray Marcos de Niza survived a shipwreck off the Texas coast. Captured by Native Americans, they spent eight years finding their way back to Mexico City, via the San Pedro Valley. Their journals, maps, and stories led to the Cibola, seven cities of gold myth. The Expedition of Francisco Vásquez de Coronado in 1539 using it as his route north through what they called the Guachuca Mountains of Pima (Tohono O'odham) lands and later part of the mission routes north, but was actually occupied by the Sobaipuri descendants of the Hohokam. They found a large Pueblo (described as a small city) between modern Benson and Whetstone, and several smaller satellite villages and smaller pueblos including ones on Fort Huachuca, Huachuca City, and North Eastern Fry. About 1657, Father Kino visited the Sobaipuris just before the Apache forced most from the valley, as they were struggling to survive due to increasing Chiricahua Apache attacks as they moved into the area of Texas Canyon of the Dragoon Mountains. In 1775, Presidio Santa Cruz de Terrenate was founded on the west bank of the San Pedro River to protect the natives and the Mexican settlers who supplied the mission stations. The presidio was chronically short on provisions due to raids, however, and lacked personnel to adequately patrol the eastern route due to wars with France and England, so the main route north shifted west to the Santa Cruz Valley, farther from the range of the Chiricahua Apache, who almost exclusively controlled the area by 1821.

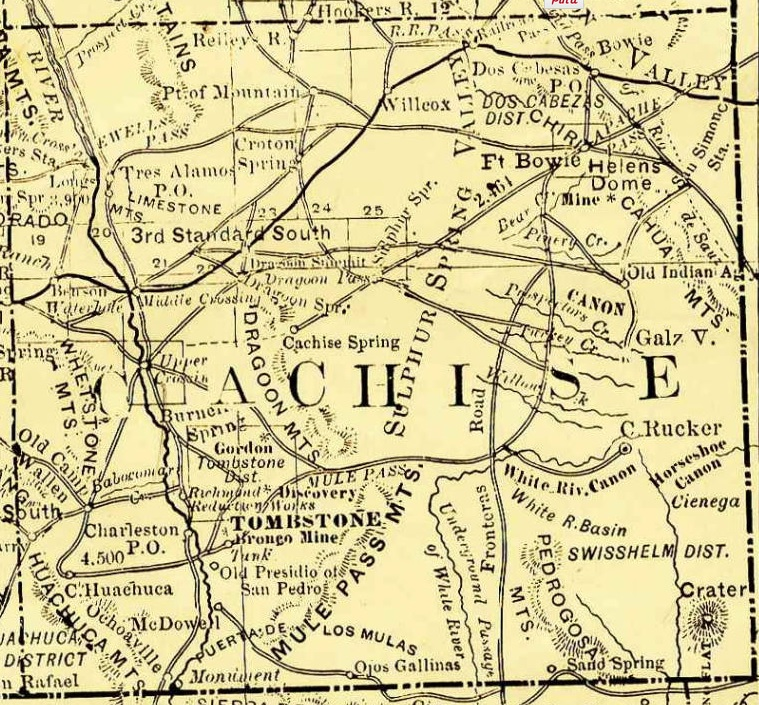
Cochise County in 1881

Cochise County was created on February 1, 1881, out of the eastern portion of Pima County. It took its name from the Chiricahua Apache war chief Cochise. The county seat was Tombstone until 1929, when it moved to Bisbee. Notable men who once held the position of county sheriff were Johnny Behan, who served as the first sheriff of the new county, and who was one of the main characters during the events leading to and following the gunfight at the O.K. Corral. Later, in 1886, Texas John Slaughter became sheriff. Lawman Jeff Milton and lawman/outlaw Burt Alvord both served as deputies under Slaughter.

A syndicated television series that aired from 1956 to 1958, The Sheriff of Cochise starring John Bromfield, was filmed on location in Cochise County. The Jimmy Stewart movie Broken Arrow and subsequent television show of the same name starring John Lupton, which also aired from 1956 to 1958, were set in Cochise County, but filmed at other locations.

J.A. Jance's Joanna Brady mystery series takes place in Cochise County, where Brady is sheriff.

Beginning in the late 1950s, the small community of Miracle Valley was the site of a series of bible colleges and similar religious organizations, founded by television evangelist A. A. Allen. In 1982, Miracle Valley and neighboring Palominas were the site of a series of escalating conflicts between a newly arrived black religious community and the county sheriff and deputies that culminated in the Miracle Valley shootout.

== Geography ==
According to the United States Census Bureau, the county has a total area of 6,219 square miles (16,110 km^{2}), of which 53 square miles (140 km^{2}) (0.9%) are covered by water. Cochise County is close to the size of the states of Rhode Island and Connecticut combined.

=== Adjacent counties and municipios ===
- Santa Cruz County – south and west
- Pima County – west
- Graham County – north
- Greenlee County – north
- Hidalgo County, New Mexico – east
- Agua Prieta, Sonora, Mexico – south
- Cananea, Sonora, Mexico – south
- Naco, Sonora, Mexico – south
- Santa Cruz, Sonora, Mexico – south

=== Protected areas ===
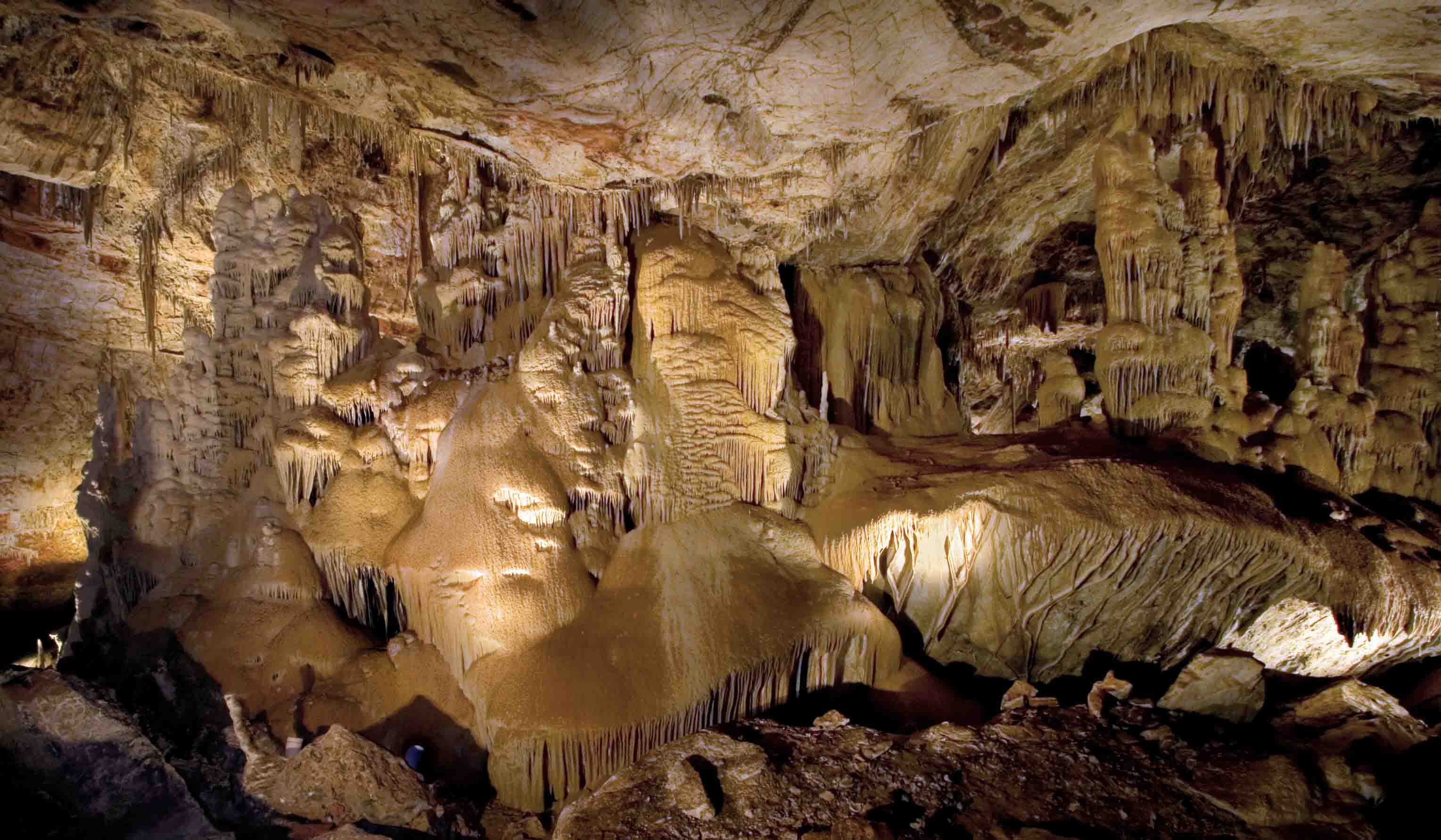
The Big Room in Kartchner Caverns

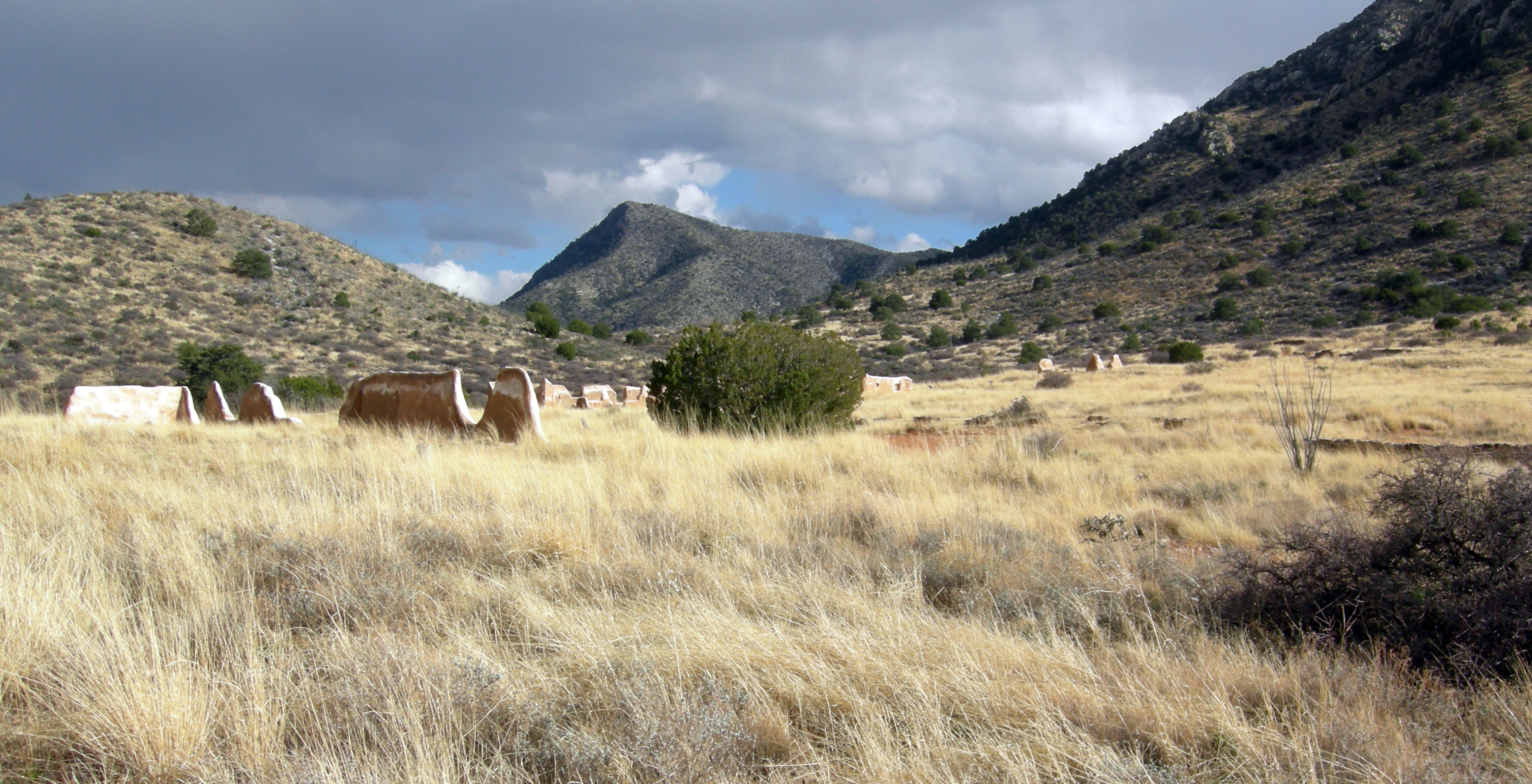
Fort Bowie site near Apache Pass.

- Chiricahua National Park
- Coronado National Forest (part)
- Coronado National Memorial
- Fort Bowie National Historic Site
- Kartchner Caverns State Park
- Leslie Canyon National Wildlife Refuge
- San Pedro Riparian National Conservation Area

== Demographics ==
Historical population
Census	Pop.	Note	%±
1890	6,938		—
1900	9,251		33.3%
1910	34,591		273.9%
1920	46,465		34.3%
1930	40,998		−11.8%
1940	34,627		−15.5%
1950	31,488		−9.1%
1960	55,039		74.8%
1970	61,910		12.5%
1980	85,686		38.4%
1990	97,624		13.9%
2000	117,755		20.6%
2010	131,346		11.5%
2020	125,447		−4.5%
2025 (est.)	126,332	▲	0.7%
U.S. Decennial Census; 1790–1960 1900–1990; 1990–2000 2010–2020

=== Racial and ethnic composition ===
Cochise County, Arizona – Racial and ethnic composition Note: the US Census treats Hispanic/Latino as an ethnic category. This table excludes Latinos from the racial categories and assigns them to a separate category. Hispanics/Latinos may be of any race.
Race / ethnicity (NH = Non-Hispanic)	2020	2010	2000	1990	1980
White alone (NH)	54.4% (68,256)	58.5% (76,805)	60.1% (70,754)	63% (61,543)	67.2% (57,586)
Black alone (NH)	3.5% (4,371)	3.8% (4,936)	4.3% (5,062)	4.9% (4,815)	3.7% (3,195)
American Indian alone (NH)	0.6% (762)	0.8% (989)	0.8% (978)	0.7% (654)	0.4% (377)
Asian alone (NH)	2.1% (2,587)	1.8% (2,410)	1.6% (1,876)	2.2% (2,108)	1.8% (1,556)
Pacific Islander alone (NH)	0.3% (421)	0.3% (379)	0.2% (271)		
Other race alone (NH)	0.6% (725)	0.2% (223)	0.2% (194)	0.1% (125)	0.1% (124)
Multiracial (NH)	4.6% (5,710)	2.3% (3,061)	2.1% (2,486)	—	—
Hispanic/Latino (any race)	34% (42,615)	32.4% (42,543)	30.7% (36,134)	29.1% (28,379)	26.7% (22,848)

=== American Community Survey 2025 data ===
The United States Census Bureau estimated that in 2025, Cochise County’s population was 126.332. It was also estimated that the county's population was 54,20% Non-Hispanic White, 35,39% Hispanic or Latino, 3,51% Non-Hispanic Black, 2,03% Asian, 0,73% Native American, 0,32% Pacific Islander, and 3,82% Multiracial.

Total	Population	Percentage
Non-Hispanic White	68.472	54,20%
Hispanic or Latino	44.706	35,39%
Non-Hispanic Black	4.440	3,51%
Asian	2.562	2,03%
Native American	916	0,73%
Pacific Islander	405	0,32%
Non-Hispanic Multiracial	4.831	3,82%

=== 2020 census ===
As of the 2020 census, the county had a population of 125,447. Of the residents, 20.8% were under the age of 18 and 24.2% were 65 years of age or older; the median age was 44.0 years. For every 100 females there were 100.7 males, and for every 100 females age 18 and over there were 100.7 males. 63.2% of residents lived in urban areas and 36.8% lived in rural areas.

The racial makeup of the county was 65.2% White, 3.8% Black or African American, 1.2% American Indian and Alaska Native, 2.2% Asian, 0.4% Native Hawaiian and Pacific Islander, 10.1% from some other race, and 17.2% from two or more races. Hispanic or Latino residents of any race comprised 34.0% of the population, as detailed in the table below.

There were 50,936 households in the county, of which 25.8% had children under the age of 18 living with them and 26.9% had a female householder with no spouse or partner present. About 31.2% of all households were made up of individuals and 15.9% had someone living alone who was 65 years of age or older.

There were 58,648 housing units, of which 13.1% were vacant. Among occupied housing units, 68.8% were owner-occupied and 31.2% were renter-occupied. The homeowner vacancy rate was 2.7% and the rental vacancy rate was 10.0%.

=== 2010 census ===
As of the census of 2010, 131,346 people, 50,865 households, and 33,653 families resided in the county. The population density was 21.3 inhabitants per square mile (8.2 inhabitants/km^{2}). The 59,041 housing units had an average density of 9.6 units per square mile (3.7 units/km^{2}). The racial makeup of the county was 78.5% White, 4.2% Black or African American, 1.9% Asian, 1.2% American Indian, 0.3% Pacific islander, 9.9% from other races, and 4.0% from two or more races. Those of Hispanic or Latino origin made up 32.4% of the population. The largest ancestry groups were:

- 28.3% Mexican
- 16.2% German
- 11.6% Irish
- 9.8% English
- 4.5% American
- 3.7% Italian
- 2.6% French
- 2.1% Scottish
- 2.0% Dutch
- 1.9% Scotch-Irish
- 1.9% Polish
- 1.5% Norwegian
- 1.1% Puerto Rican
- 1.1% Swedish

Of the 50,865 households, 30.4% had children under 18 living with them, 50.0% were married couples living together, 11.5% had a female householder with no husband present, 33.8% were not families, and 28.2% were made up of individuals. The average household size was 2.46 and the average family size was 3.02. The median age was 39.7 years.

The median income for a household in the county was $44,876 and for a family was $53,077. Males had a median income of $42,164 versus $31,019 for females. The per capita income for the county was $23,010. About 11.8% of families and 15.7% of the population were below the poverty line, including 23.2% of those under 18 and 10.7% of those 65 or over.

=== 2000 census ===
As of the census of 2000, 117,755 people, 43,893 households, and 30,768 families were residing in the county. The population density was 19 people per square mile (7.3 people/km^{2}). The 51,126 housing units had an average density of 8 units per square mile (3.1 units/km^{2}). The racial makeup of the county was 76.7% White, 4.5% African American, 1.2% Native American, 1.7% Asian, 0.3% Pacific Islander, 12.1% from other races, and 3.7% from two or more races. About 30.7% of the population were Hispanics or Latino of any race. Around 25.4% reported speaking Spanish at home, while 1.3% spoke German.

The Copper Queen Hotel in Bisbee

There were 43,893 households, out of which 32.0% had children under the age of 18 living with them, 55.1% were married couples living together, 11.1% had a female householder with no husband present, and 29.9% were non-families. 25.3% of all households were made up of individuals, and 10.1% had someone living alone who was 65 years of age or older. The average household size was 2.55 and the average family size was 3.07.

In the county, the population was spread out, with 26.3% under the age of 18, 9.3% from 18 to 24, 26.0% from 25 to 44, 23.7% from 45 to 64, and 14.7% who were 65 years of age or older. The median age was 37 years. For every 100 females there were 101.60 males. For every 100 females age 18 and over, there were 101.20 males.

The median income for a household in the county was $32,105, and the median income for a family was $38,005. Males had a median income of $30,533 versus $22,252 for females. The per capita income for the county was $15,988. About 13.5% of families and 17.7% of the population were below the poverty line, including 25.8% of those under age 18 and 10.4% of those age 65 or over.

In 2000, the largest denominational groups were the Catholics (with 25,837 adherents) and Evangelical Protestants (with 12,548 adherents). The largest religious bodies were the Catholic Church (with 25,837 members) and the Southern Baptist Convention (with 5,999 members).

== Politics ==
Cochise County leans strongly towards the Republican Party in presidential elections. Although Bill Clinton carried the county narrowly in 1992, it has supported the Republican nominee by large margins in every other election since 1968, except for 1996 and 1976 when Clinton and Jimmy Carter each lost only narrowly. Although the county includes the relatively liberal town of Bisbee, as well as the city of Douglas which has a large Latino population, this is outweighed by the heavily Republican tilt of the more populous Sierra Vista, which is adjacent to Fort Huachuca and thus has a heavy military presence.

United States presidential election results for Cochise County, Arizona
Year	Republican		Democratic		Third party(ies)	
Year	No.	%	No.	%	No.	%
1912	403	8.72%	1,973	42.71%	2,243	48.56%
1916	3,203	31.61%	6,115	60.35%	814	8.03%
1920	5,341	54.66%	4,430	45.34%	0	0.00%
1924	3,712	38.27%	3,496	36.04%	2,491	25.68%
1928	5,776	57.28%	4,262	42.27%	45	0.45%
1932	2,838	25.30%	7,798	69.53%	580	5.17%
1936	2,092	19.93%	8,130	77.44%	277	2.64%
1940	3,170	26.53%	8,748	73.21%	32	0.27%
1944	3,371	32.67%	6,935	67.21%	13	0.13%
1948	3,854	37.16%	6,198	59.77%	318	3.07%
1952	6,495	53.52%	5,640	46.48%	0	0.00%
1956	6,893	56.36%	5,328	43.57%	9	0.07%
1960	7,572	50.46%	7,419	49.44%	16	0.11%
1964	7,644	45.78%	9,045	54.17%	8	0.05%
1968	7,619	45.59%	6,597	39.48%	2,495	14.93%
1972	11,706	63.97%	6,023	32.91%	570	3.11%
1976	9,921	49.90%	9,281	46.68%	681	3.43%
1980	13,351	59.48%	7,028	31.31%	2,066	9.20%
1984	16,405	62.25%	9,671	36.70%	279	1.06%
1988	15,815	56.38%	11,812	42.11%	423	1.51%
1992	12,202	36.81%	12,701	38.31%	8,247	24.88%
1996	14,365	45.00%	13,782	43.17%	3,776	11.83%
2000	18,180	54.69%	13,360	40.19%	1,701	5.12%
2004	26,556	59.55%	17,514	39.27%	525	1.18%
2008	29,026	59.14%	18,943	38.60%	1,112	2.27%
2012	29,497	59.95%	18,546	37.69%	1,158	2.35%
2016	28,092	56.17%	17,450	34.89%	4,473	8.94%
2020	35,557	58.80%	23,732	39.24%	1,184	1.96%
2024	35,936	60.98%	22,296	37.83%	703	1.19%

In the United States House of Representatives, the county is mostly part of Arizona's 6th congressional district, which is represented by Republican Juan Ciscomani. In the Arizona Legislature, the county is part of the 19th district and is represented by Republican David Gowan in the State Senate and Republicans Gail Griffin and Lupe Diaz in the State House of Representatives. This district also includes the entirety of Greenlee County, as well as portions of Pima County, Graham County, and Santa Cruz County.

== Transportation ==
=== Major highways ===
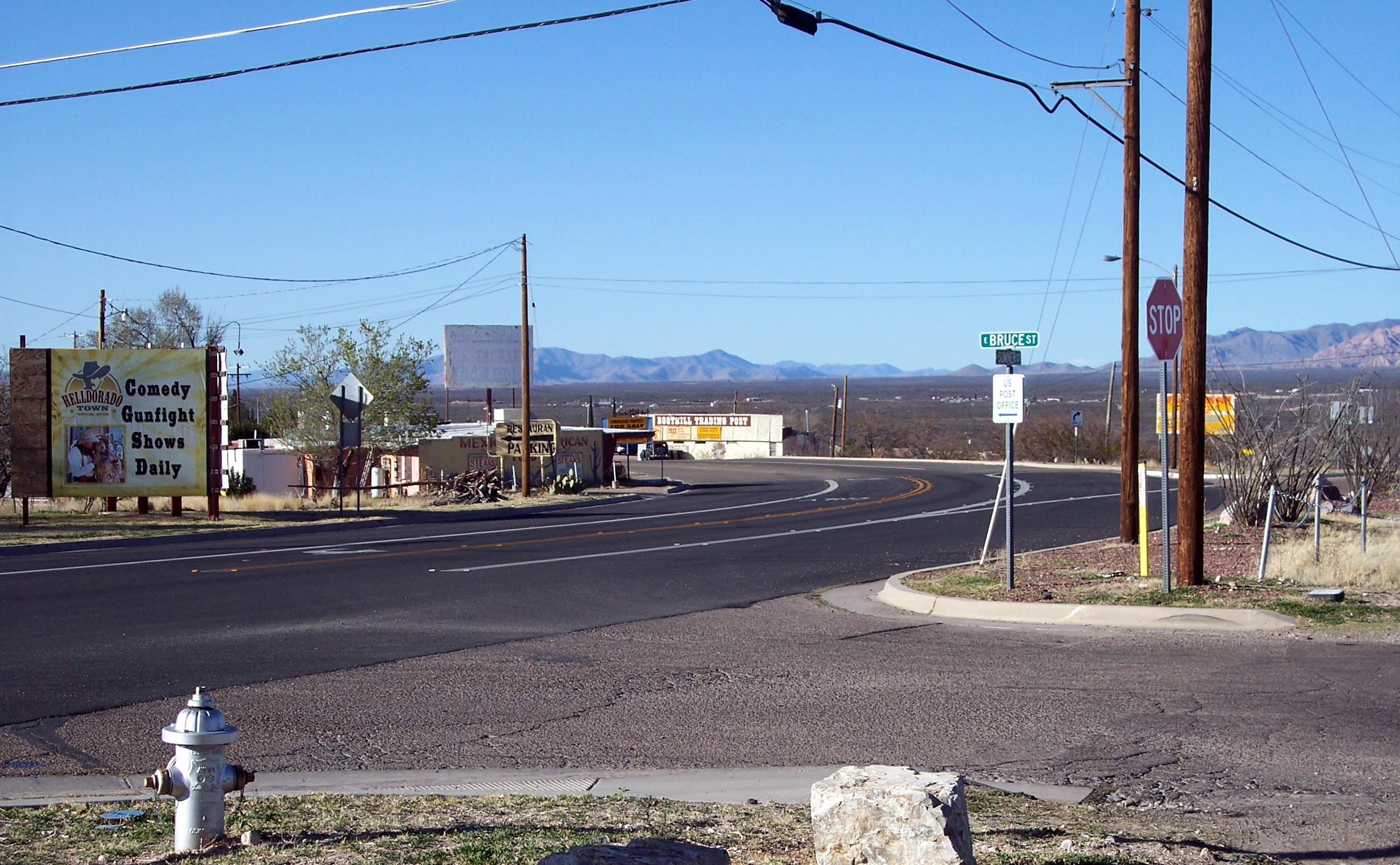
State Route 80 seen towards north in Tombstone

- Interstate 10
- Historic U.S. Route 80
- U.S. Route 191
- State Route 80
- State Route 82
- State Route 83
- State Route 90
- State Route 92
- State Route 181
- State Route 186

=== Airports ===
Bisbee Municipal Airport is owned by the City of Bisbee and located five nautical miles (9 km) southeast of its central business district

Sierra Vista Municipal Airport (IATA: FHU, ICAO: KFHU, FAA LID: FHU), a joint-use civil-military airport which shares facilities with Libby Army Airfield, is located on the U.S. Army installation Fort Huachuca in the city of Sierra Vista. The airport has three runways and one helipad. It is mostly used for military aviation for the surrounding military base.

No commercial flights occur at Cochise County; the nearest commercial airport is at Tucson, about 70 miles from Sierra Vista.

== Communities ==
Map of incorporated areas and unincorporated areas in Cochise County with the largest city, Sierra Vista highlighted

=== Cities ===
- Benson
- Bisbee (county seat)
- Douglas
- Sierra Vista
- Tombstone
- Willcox

=== Towns ===
- Huachuca City

=== Census-designated places ===
- Bowie
- Dragoon
- Elfrida
- McNeal
- Mescal
- Miracle Valley
- Naco
- Palominas
- Pirtleville
- St. David
- San Simon
- Sierra Vista Southeast
- Sunizona
- Sunsites
- Whetstone

=== Other places ===
- Amber
- Babocomari
- Charleston
- Cochise
- Cross Rail Ranch
- Dos Cabezas
- Double Adobe
- El Dorado
- Hereford
- Hookers Hot Springs
- Kansas Settlement
- Leslie Canyon National Wildlife refuge
- Nicksville
- Paul Spur
- Pomerene
- Portal
- Paradise
- Rucker
- Stewart District
- Sunnyside
- Tintown

=== Military sites ===
- Fort Huachuca
- Willcox Playa (proving ground)

=== Ghost towns ===
- Apache
- Black Diamond
- Cascabel
- Charleston
- Cochise
- Contention City
- Courtland
- Fairbank
- Galeyville
- Gleeson
- Hilltop
- Johnson
- Millville
- Paradise
- Pearce
- Tres Alamos

=== County population ranking ===
The population ranking of the following table is based on the 2010 census of Cochise County.

† county seat

Rank	City/Town/etc.	Population (2010 Census)	Municipal type	Incorporated
1	Sierra Vista	43,888	City	1956
2	Douglas	17,378	City	1905
3	Sierra Vista Southeast	14,797	CDP	
4	† Bisbee	5,575	City	1902
5	Benson	5,105	City	1880 (founded)
6	Willcox	3,757	City	1915
7	Whetstone	2,617	CDP	
8	Huachuca City	1,853	Town	1958
9	Mescal	1,812	CDP	
10	Pirtleville	1,744	CDP	
11	St. David	1,699	CDP	
12	Tombstone	1,380	City	1881
13	Naco	1,046	CDP	
14	Miracle Valley	644	CDP	
15	Elfrida	459	CDP	
16	Bowie	449	CDP	
17	Sunizona	281	CDP	
18	McNeal	238	CDP	
19	Palominas	212	CDP	
20	Dragoon	209	CDP	
21	San Simon	165	CDP	
22	Sunsites	40	CDP	

== Education ==
School districts include:

Unified:

- Benson Unified School District
- Bisbee Unified District (Bisbee High School)
- Bowie Unified District
- Douglas Unified District
- Fort Huachuca Accommodation District
- San Simon Unified District
- St. David Unified District
- Sierra Vista Unified District
- Tombstone Unified District
- Willcox Unified District

Secondary:

- Valley Union High School District

Elementary:

- Apache Elementary District
- Ash Creek Elementary District
- Cochise Elementary District
- Double Adobe Elementary District
- Elfrida Elementary District
- McNeal Elementary District
- Naco Elementary District
- Palominas Elementary District
- Pearce Elementary District
- Pomerene Elementary District
- Rucker Elementary District

The Rucker Elementary School district, in 2002, operated no schools and sent its elementary students to the Elfrida district. The Rucker district had a bus driver and an administrator as employees. The residents liked the arrangement as they could pay less tax.

== See also ==
- National Register of Historic Places listings in Cochise County, Arizona
- San Pedro Valley Observatory
