= Mica Mountain High School =

High school in Tucson, Arizona

Location
- 10800 E. Valencia Road; Tucson, Arizona 85747; United States
- 32°07′08″N 110°45′07″W

Information
- Type: Public
- Opened: August 10, 2020
- School district: Vail Unified School District
- Principal: Nemer Hassey
- Grades: 9–12
- Enrollment: 1,306 (2023–2024)
- Colors: Black, powder blue and silver
- Mascot: Thunderbolts, Warthogs (Maverick and Skye)
- Website: mmhs.vailschooldistrict.org

Mica Mountain High School is a high school in Tucson, Arizona, the fourth public high school operated by the Vail Unified School District.

== History ==
A $61.3 million bond narrowly passed by Vail School District voters, by a margin of 483 votes, in November 2018 allowed the school district to move forward with the first phase of the Mica Mountain project, for which $35 million was earmarked. The district direly needed to build the first phase to alleviate overcrowding that had led to high school gyms and libraries being used as overflow classrooms. Additionally, the Vail Inclusive Preschool program, which had been housed at Cienega High School, would relocate to an expanded space on the new campus. Land was acquired in May 2019 for the school; both the $6.5 million land cost and a further $22 million toward construction were contributed by the Arizona School Facilities Board.

Nemer Hassey, who had been the former Cienega High football coach, was tapped to lead the new school. A 200-member committee handled school design, including naming and mascot selection; Mica Mountain is the highest peak in the Rincon Mountains, while the Thunderbolts moniker refers to the summer monsoons and the A-10 Thunderbolts at nearby Davis-Monthan Air Force Base.
