= Palominas, Arizona =

CDP in Cochise County, Arizona

- Census-designated place
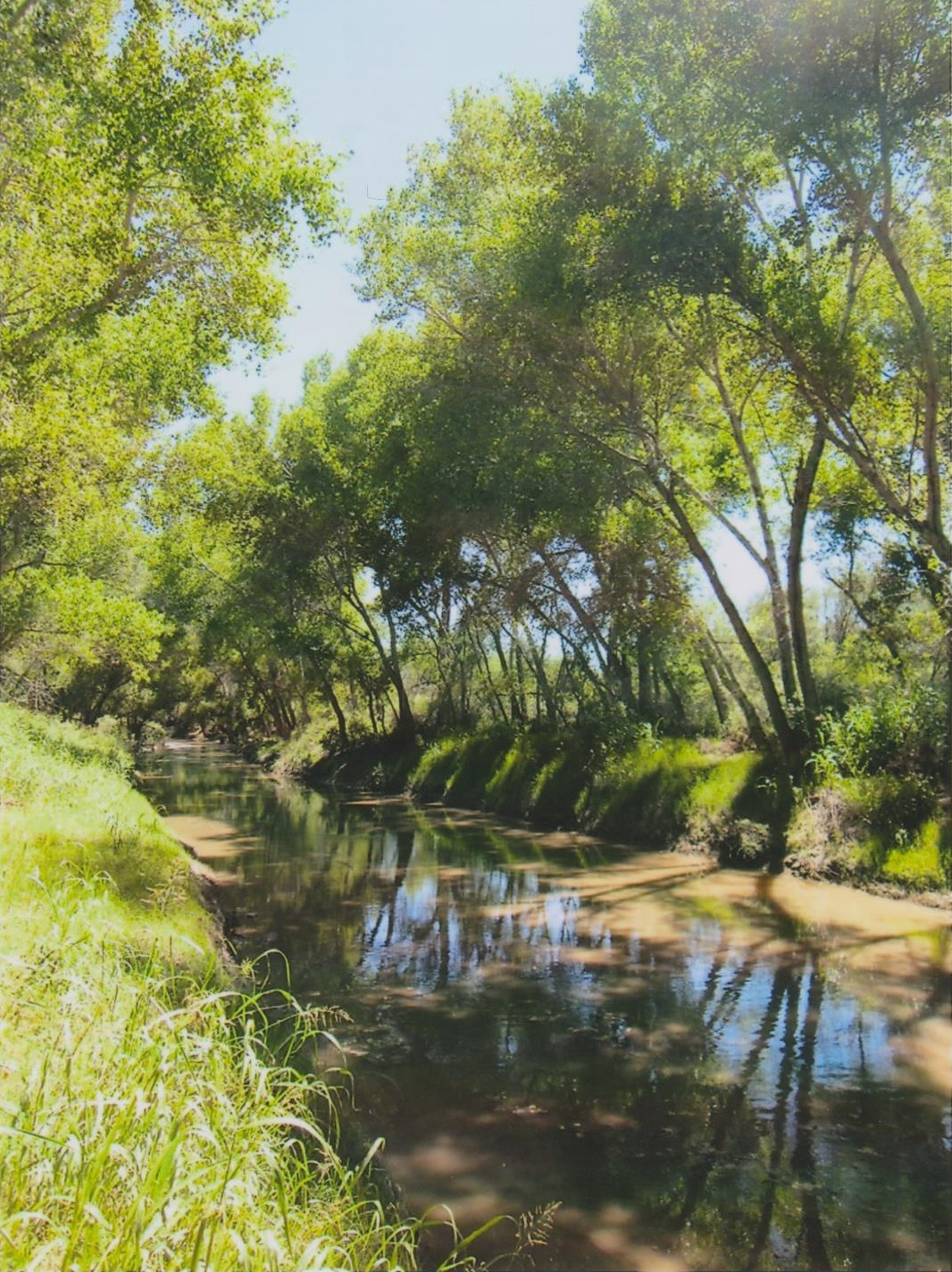
- San Pedro River

- Location of Palominas in Cochise County, Arizona.

- Location in Arizona
- Coordinates: 31°22′47″N 110°07′27″W
- Country: United States
- State: Arizona
- County: Cochise

Area
  - Total: 1.95 sq mi (5.05 km^{2})
  - Land: 1.95 sq mi (5.04 km^{2})
  - Water: 0.0039 sq mi (0.01 km^{2})
- Elevation: 4,242 ft (1,293 m)

Population (2020)
  - Total: 222
  - Density: 114.0/sq mi (44.02/km^{2})
- Time zone: UTC-7 (MST (no daylight saving time))
- ZIP code: 85615
- Area code: 520
- FIPS code: 04-52230
- GNIS feature ID: 2582839

Palominas is a census-designated place located along the San Pedro River in the southern portion of Cochise County in the state of Arizona, United States. Palominas is located very close to the community of Miracle Valley along Arizona State Route 92. The population of Palominas as of the 2020 U.S. Census was 222.

== Demographics ==
Historical population
Census	Pop.	Note	%±
2020	222		—
U.S. Decennial Census

Palominas Racial Composition as of 2020 (NH = Non-Hispanic) (Note: Note: the US Census treats Hispanic/Latino as an ethnic category. This table excludes Latinos from the racial categories and assigns them to a separate category. Hispanics/Latinos can be of any race.)
Race	Number	Percentage
White (NH)	173 1 Maine-iac	77.03%
Black or African American (NH)	4	1.8%
Native American or Alaska Native (NH)	4	1.8%
Asian (NH)	3	1.35%
Pacific Islander (NH)	2	0.9%
Some Other Race (NH)	4	1.8%
Mixed/Multi-Racial (NH)	34	15.32%
Hispanic or Latino	45	20.27%
Total	222	

== Transportation ==
Cochice Connection provides bus connections between Douglas, Bisbee, and Sierra Vista, with a stop in Palominas.

== Education ==
Palominas Elementary School District is based in and serves Palominas.

== Gallery ==
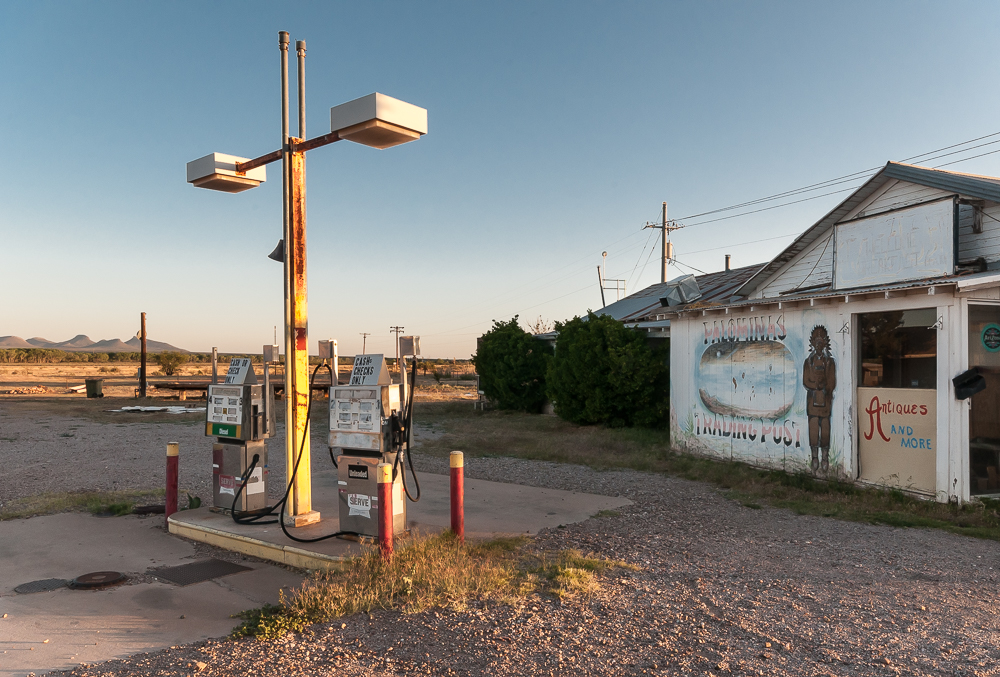
Old Abandoned Palominas Trading Post

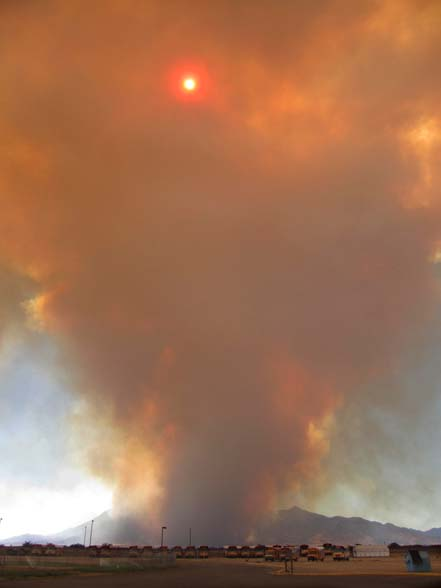
Monument Fire from Palominas, AZ on June 14, 2011
