= Alonzo Highsmith Jr. =

American football player and coach (born 1989)

Alonzo Highsmith
No. 45, 59
- Position: Linebacker

Personal information
- Born: November 21, 1989 (age 36); Brooksville, Florida, U.S.
- Listed height: 6 ft 1 in (1.85 m)
- Listed weight: 233 lb (106 kg)

Career information
- High school: Missouri City (TX) Hightower
- College: Arkansas
- NFL draft: 2013: undrafted

Career history

Playing
- Miami Dolphins (2013)*; Kansas City Chiefs (2014)*; Omaha Mammoths (2014); Washington Redskins (2015)*; Hudson Valley Fort (2015)
- * Offseason or practice squad member only

Coaching
- Willcox High School (2017–2020)

Alonzo Jakeswic Highsmith Jr. (born November 21, 1989) is an American former football linebacker. He signed with the Miami Dolphins as an undrafted free agent in 2013. He played college football at Arkansas.

== College career ==
=== Phoenix College ===
He attended the junior college Phoenix College. In 2010, he recorded 94 tackles, 79 of which were solo, and 12 of which were tackles for loss. In addition he achieved four quarterback sacks. During his time at Phoenix College he was selected as the NJCAA Region One co-Defensive Player of the Year and was also named the WSFL Defensive Player of the Year.

=== Arkansas ===
Following his sophomore year Highsmith transferred to the University of Arkansas. In his junior season, he started all 13 games for the Razorbacks, recording 80 tackles, 4.5 sacks, one forced fumble, one pass deflection and one interception.

== Professional career ==
Pre-draft measurables
Height	Weight	Arm length	Hand span	Wingspan
6 ft 0 1/4 in (1.84 m)	234 lb (106 kg)	33 1/4 in (0.84 m)	9 1/8 in (0.23 m)	6 ft 7 1/4 in (2.01 m)
All values from Pro Day

=== Miami Dolphins ===
On April 27, 2013, Highsmith signed with the Miami Dolphins as an undrafted free agent following the 2013 NFL draft. On August 23, 2013, he was waived by the Dolphins.

=== Kansas City Chiefs ===
On January 14, 2014, he signed with the Kansas City Chiefs to a reserve/future contract. On August 29, 2014, he was released by the Chiefs.

=== Washington Redskins ===
Highsmith Jr. signed with the Washington Redskins on May 18, 2015. He was waived on August 31.

== Coaching career ==
In 2017, he became a football coach at Willcox High School. In 2025, he was named the head coach for Youngker High School in Buckeye, Arizona.

== Personal life ==
He is the son of former NFL running back Alonzo Highsmith. His brother is A.J. Highsmith, who currently is a personnel executive for the New England Patriots.
