= Douglas High School (Arizona) =

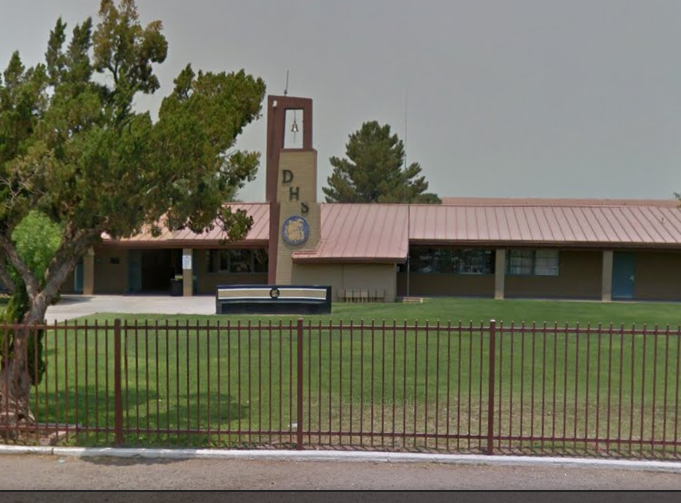
- Douglas High School building

Location
- 1500 Fifteenth Street; Douglas, Arizona 85607-1797; United States; 31°21′01″N 109°32′16″W

Information
- Type: Public school
- Motto: Olim taurus canis canem semper taurus
- Established: 1908 (118 years ago)
- School district: Douglas Unified School District
- CEEB code: 030075
- Principal: Melissa Rodriguez
- Teaching staff: 73.00 (FTE)
- Enrollment: 1,338 (2023–2024)
- Student to teacher ratio: 18.33
- Colors: Black and gold
- Team name: Bulldogs
- Website: www.douglasschools.org/o/douglas-high-school

Douglas High School (DHS) is a public high school in Douglas, Arizona. The school enrolled 1,378 in the 2011–2012 school year who primarily come from two feeder schools, Paul Huber Middle School and Ray Borane Middle School, both located in Douglas.

== History ==
The school was founded in 1908 and was originally located at 840 E. 12th St. In 1949 the new Douglas High School opened at 1500 15th St. The new campus was designed by the architecture firm Edward L. Varney Associates of Phoenix. The construction contract to build the new school was awarded to Duam Donaldson Construction Co. also of Phoenix.

== Academics ==
Principal: Melissa Rodriguez. Assistant Principal of Athletics: Angel Ortega. Assistant Principal of CTE: Albert Young. Assistant Principal of Curriculum: Angel Vidal

Total enrollment was 1,480 students in 2017, and the student/teacher ratio was 28:1.

== Sports ==
The school's main rival is Bisbee High School. "The Copper Pick", as the football series between the schools is known, has been played 140 times, with Douglas leading the series 75–57–8.

The Bulldogs won the class 4A football championship in 1957 (both "mythical" or non-playoff titles), and 1961. In 1946, they did not win the state championship, in part because they were forced to forfeit several games due to rules violations, but they did almost force a playoff game with Mesa for the title. The Bulldogs won the class 4A basketball championship in 1932.

The Douglas Bulldogs were once home to Kenny Cormier, 2004 Foot Locker Nationals Cross Country Champion.

The Douglas Bulldogs had two state champions in Track & Field in 2011. Melissa Castillo won the girls triple jump, while Alfonso Mejia won the boys 300-intermediate hurdles.

== Notable alumni ==
- Bill Melendez: José Cuauhtémoc "Bill" Melendez (1916–2008), was a director, animator, and cartoonist. He was known for his work with the Peanuts specials, where he also performed the voice effects of Snoopy, and for his work with several Disney projects. His other works included two Garfield specials. He won several Emmy awards and numerous other awards.
- Gib Dawson - NFL Football Player
