= SJUSD =

SJUSD may refer to

- San Juan Unified School District
- San Jose Unified School District
- St. Johns Unified School District
- Snowline Joint Unified School District
- San Jacinto Unified School District
