= St. Johns School District =

St. Johns School District may refer to:

- St. Johns Unified School District (Arizona)
- St. Johns County School District (Florida)

== See also ==
- St. Thomas-St. John School District (U.S. Virgin Islands)
