= Radius Books =

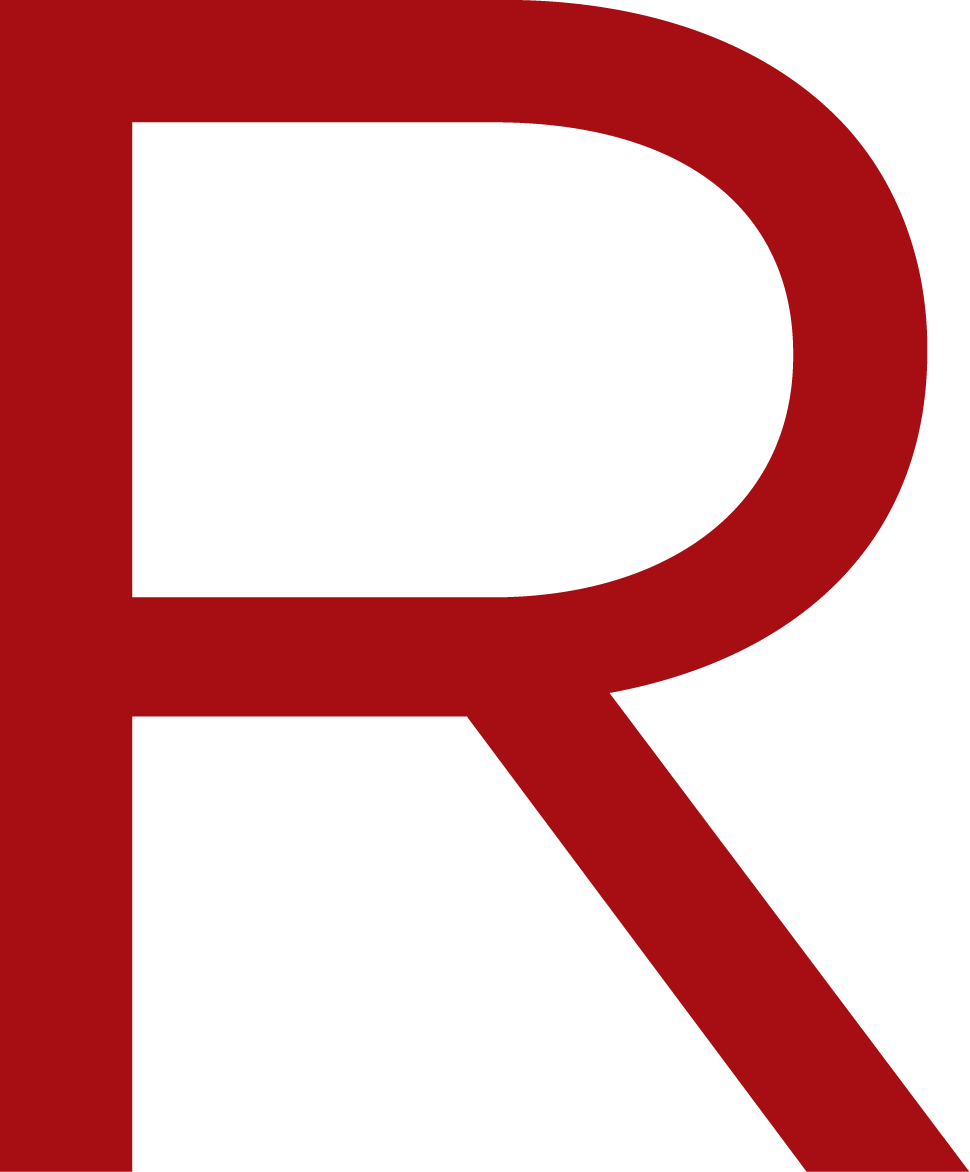
- Founded: 2007
- Founder: David Chickey, Darius Himes, David Skolkin, Joanna Hurley
- Country of origin: United States
- Headquarters location: Santa Fe, New Mexico
- Distribution: Distributed Art Publishers
- Key people: David Chickey
- Nonfiction topics: Art and Photography Publishing
- Official website: www.radiusbooks.org

Radius Books is a non-profit art book publishing company, with a focus on photography, fine art and monographs, located in Santa Fe, New Mexico. Co-publishing partners include David Zwirner Gallery, Harvard Peabody Museum Press, Temple University Press, Art Institute of Chicago, San Francisco Museum of Modern Art, The Contemporary Austin, and Museum of Contemporary Art San Diego.

== History ==
Radius Books was established in 2007 by David Chickey, publisher, editor, and book designer; Darius Himes, editor; David Skolkin, production; and Joanna Hurley, marketing and public relations. The impetus to found a non-profit publisher arose, in part, from the issue of library budget cuts in the early 2000s, which adversely affected the sales of art books.

== Donation Program ==
Radius Books donates copies of every book published to school, public and university libraries, and arts organizations across the United States. Currently, Radius serves 527 institutions and schools in all 50 US states, donating 300 to 400 copies of one book at a time. Since its founding, Radius founder and Creative Director David Chickey estimates that the non-profit has donated nearly 40,000 books, especially targeting rural and underserved libraries. Ash Creek Elementary School District, Denver Public Library, New Mexico State University Library, and Memphis College of Art are a few of Radius Books' donation recipients.

== Titles ==
Radius Books published 4 titles in their first year. From 2008 to 2010, they doubled their production, publishing 8 titles. Since 2011, Radius has published 15 to 20 titles each year, ranging from monographs on historical and contemporary artists as well as featuring museum collections and exhibitions

== Awards ==
Since its founding, Radius Books has been recognized with multiple design and publishing awards. From 2010-2015, Radius was selected eight times for the AIGA (American Institute of Graphic Arts)/The Design Observer Group '50 Books/ 50 Covers' competition, which is the longest running design competition in the United States. In 2010, Michael Light: LA Day/LA Night and David Taylor: Working the Line were recognized for their inventive cover designs. In 2012, Fred Sandback, published in conjunction with David Zwirner Gallery, was an AIGA book selection. Janelle Lynch: Barcelona and Stephen Dupont: Piksa Niugini, both from 2013, garnered a cover selection and book selection, respectively. In 2014, Covert Operations Investigating the Known Unknowns and James Drake: 1242, both published in conjunction with Museum of Contemporary Art in San Diego, were selected books. The Meadow, which debuted in 2015, was a noted book selection. The Independent Publisher Book Awards has also recognized Radius Books for excellence in publishing. In 2014, Mitakuye Oyasin, by Aaron Huey, won a gold medal in the photography division. The following year, Julie Blackmon: Homegrown won a silver medal for photography. American Alliance of Museums Publishing Publications Design Competition has recognized Radius Books for "superior execution and ingenuity in graphic design of museum publications" in 2013, 2014 and 2015. The Publishers Association of the West has also recognized Radius Books with a book design award. International Center of Photography recognized Radius with an Infinity Award for best photographic book of the year. In 2014, Time listed three Radius Books in their Guide to the Best Fall Photobooks, including Julie Blackmon: Homegrown, Laura Letinsky: Ill Form and Full Void, and Michael Light: Lake Las Vegas/Black Mountain. Kevin Bubriski's Nepal: 1975-2011 was recognized with a New England Book Show Award.
