= Buena High School =

Buena High School can refer to:

- Buena High School (Arizona), in Sierra Vista, Arizona
- Buena High School (California), in Ventura, California
- Buena Regional High School, in Buena, New Jersey
