= Double Adobe, Arizona =

- Populated place
- Location within the state of Arizona Double Adobe (the United States)
- Coordinates: 31°28′00″N 109°41′24″W
- Country: United States
- State: Arizona
- County: Cochise
- Elevation: 4,009 ft (1,222 m)
- Time zone: UTC-7 (Mountain (MST))
  - Summer (DST): UTC-7 (MST)
- Area code: 520
- FIPS code: 04-19980
- GNIS feature ID: 4047

Double Adobe is a populated place situated in Cochise County, Arizona, United States.
