= Bowie High School (Arizona) =

Coordinates: 32.3253°N 109.4898°W

Location
- 315 W. Fifth Street; Bowie, Arizona 85605; United States

Information
- School type: Public high school
- Established: 1922 (104 years ago)
- School district: Bowie Unified School District
- CEEB code: 030025
- Teaching staff: 2.00 (FTE)
- Grades: 9–12
- Enrollment: 19 (2023-2024)
- Student to teacher ratio: 9.50
- Colors: Red and Black
- Mascot: Panther
- Website: www.bowieschools.org

Bowie High School is a high school in Bowie, Arizona. It, along with an elementary school and middle school, comprises the Bowie Unified School District. Its enrollment of 17 students makes it the smallest high school currently in the Arizona Interscholastic Association. The school conducts a combined athletic program with nearby, 39-student San Simon High School; both district superintendents coach one sport.

In 2013, in order to maintain a quality level of service, Bowie USD moved all high school classes online, which was intended to allow for increased choice while keeping the program viable. The K–8 component of the school continues to have traditional teachers.
