= Galeyville, Arizona =

- Populated place
- Location within the state of Arizona Galeyville (the United States)
- Coordinates: 31°57′01″N 109°13′06″W
- Country: United States
- State: Arizona
- County: Cochise
- Elevation: 5,732 ft (1,747 m)
- Time zone: UTC-7 (Mountain (MST))
  - Summer (DST): UTC-7 (MST)
- Area code: 520
- FIPS code: 04-26165
- GNIS feature ID: 24426

Galeyville is a populated place situated in Cochise County, Arizona, United States. Founded in 1881, it is now a ghost town. It has an estimated elevation of 5,732 feet (1,747 m) above sea level.
