= Valley Union High School =

Location
- 4088 E. Jefferson Rd; Elfrida, Arizona 85610; United States
- Coordinates: 31°41′10″N 109°40′52″W

Information
- School type: Public high school
- School district: Valley Union High School District
- Superintendent: Kyle Hart
- CEEB code: 030095
- Principal: Richard Anderson
- Grades: 9-12
- Enrollment: 87 (2023–2024)
- Colors: Blue and white
- Mascot: Blue Devil
- Alumni: Ryan Stukel, catcher for the Baylor Bears (1998-2001), Kellie Walker, Middle Blocker for the Belmont Bruins (2002-2004), Lee Patterson, sportscaster for KATO 1230AM, Safford, AZ
- Website: www.vuhs.net

Valley Union High School is a high school in Elfrida, Arizona. It is the only school in the Valley Union High School District.
