= Vail Academy and High School =

K-12 school in Vail, Arizona

Location
- 7762 E. Science Park Dr. Tucson, Arizona; United States; 32°05′30″N 110°48′36″W

Information
- Type: High school
- Established: 1997 (29 years ago)
- Oversight: Vail Unified School District
- CEEB code: 030537
- Principal: Diane Vargo
- Teaching staff: 103.63 (FTE)
- Grades: K-12
- Enrollment: 564 (2023–2024)
- Student to teacher ratio: 5.44
- Colors: Blue and silver
- Mascot: Boxer
- Website: vahs.vailschooldistrict.org

Vail Academy and High School, or VAHS, is a school located in the UA Tech Park, also known as Tech Parks Arizona. It was founded in 1997 to accommodate the fast-growing community surrounding Vail. It previously served just high school students, but since then, it has become a K-12 school. The school mascot is the Boxer. Students must complete a senior exit project in order to graduate, as this is a requirement in the Vail Unified School District.

== 2026 town hall meeting ==
On May 18, 2026, a town hall meeting took place at VAHS that addressed declining enrollment in the school's high school program, exploring options such as potentially shifting to a K-8 or K-10 school starting in the 2027-28 school year. The Vail School District has estimated that the high school program has lost the district over $1 million.
