= St. Johns High School (Arizona) =

Secondary school in Apache County, Arizona

- Home of the Redskins

Location
- 360 Redskin Drive; St. Johns, Arizona 85936; United States; 34°30′00″N 109°23′06″W

Information
- School type: Public high school
- Established: 1926
- School district: St. Johns Unified School District
- CEEB code: 030365
- Principal: Stephanie Mouritsen
- Teaching staff: 19.62 (FTE)
- Grades: 9-12
- Enrollment: 310 (2023-2024)
- Student to teacher ratio: 15.80
- Colors: Red and white
- Mascot: Redskins
- Website: www.sjusd.net/o/sjhs/

St. Johns High School is a high school in St. Johns, Arizona established in 1926. It is the only high school under the jurisdiction of the St. Johns Unified School District, which also includes Coronado Elementary School and St Johns Middle School. The school moved to its current campus in 1981. The old campus is now county offices. Their mascot is the Redskin. This rural high school has the longest high school rivalry in Arizona state history with the neighboring high school, Round Valley Elks. This rivalry dates back to 1904.

== Sports & Activities ==
St. Johns High School participates within the Arizona Interscholastic Association and has 11 sports and 1 activity.

Season	Sport	Current Head Coach
Fall	Girls Soccer	Shayla Udall
Fall	Boys Soccer	TJ Hendriksen
Fall	Volleyball	Kristen Knight
Fall	Football	Jake Udall
Winter	Boys Basketball	Casey Heap
Winter	Girls Basketball	Ray Davis
Winter	Wrestling	Brandon Crosby
Spring	Baseball	Kenneth Blank
Spring	Softball	Kasey Nelson
Spring	Boys Track & Field	Charles Stumbaugh
Spring	Girls Track & Field	Jami Lee

Activity	Current Head Coach
Spiritline	Kyrie Raban

== See also ==
- Native American mascot controversy
- Sports teams named Redskins
