= Buena High School (Arizona) =

Coordinates: 31.5712°N 110.2370°W

Location
- 5225 East Buena School Boulevard; Sierra Vista, Arizona 85635; United States

Information
- Type: Public
- School district: Sierra Vista Unified School District
- CEEB code: 030417
- Principal: Nicole Young
- Teaching staff: 83.20 (FTE)
- Enrollment: 1,750 (2023–2024)
- Student to teacher ratio: 21.03
- Colors: Blue and white
- Mascot: Colts
- Accreditation: North Central Association
- Website: www.svusd68.org/o/bhs

Buena High School is a high school in Sierra Vista, Arizona. It is the only high school in the Sierra Vista Unified School District.

The current school building was built in the early 1990s to accommodate an ever-expanding student enrollment and opened in the spring of the 1991–92 school year. The school was built to handle an enrollment of up to 2,500 students; it was over-capacity from its opening and filled to capacity through the late 2000s.

It serves high school-aged dependent children living on Fort Huachuca.

== Theater ==
Buena was built with a large theater for use by both the high school and the community. The Klein Performing Arts Center main auditorium can seat from 907 to as many as 1319 by opening the two 'pods'. The Little Theater Pod seats 206 and features a small stage with self-contained computer lighting and sound. The Lecture Pod seats 213 and is ideal for group meetings. Several school, community, and commercial events are held in the various BPAC facilities each year. Buena's performing arts program was also ranked among the top in the nation, led by beloved fine arts teacher, Carrie Duerk.

== Clubs and organizations ==
Buena High School has over 60 student clubs and organizations, including Modern Music Masters, National Art Honor Society, Buena Fine Arts Productions, and International Thespian Society troupe 2903. A list can be found on the "Clubs and Organizations" portion of the school's website.

== Notable alumni ==
- Bradley J. Nozicka, concert promoter; music producer GoTucson
- Don Frye, wrestler; retired professional mixed martial artist* Laurence Gibson (2009), National Football League player
- Stan Short (1991) National Football League player
- Lisa Song Sutton (2002), entrepreneur, Miss Nevada United States 2014 and former congressional candidate
- John Rade (1978), National Football League player
- Rick Renzi (1976), former Republican Congressman
- Donnie Veal (2003), Major League Baseball player
- Darick Hall (2014) Major League Baseball player
- Kimberly (Zeiler) Lattimore (1984), Ms. California America 2013
- Luis Robles (2002), Major League Soccer player (New York Red Bulls)
- Fernando Ortega (2002) Major League Baseball Scout
- Brandi Milloy (2001), TV Host, Food Reporter, Lifestyle & Parenting Expert
- Audrey Valles née Sibley (2003), Miss Arizona 2005
- Erin Nurss (2003), Miss Arizona 2008
- Victor Jay Ratliff (1994), National Football League player

== See also ==
- Cochise County, Arizona
