= Pomer =

Pomer may refer to:

- Pomer, Zaragoza, Spanish municipality
- Pomer, Croatia, Croatian village
- Joshua L. Pomer (born 1980), American film director, screenwriter, and producer

== See also ==
- Pomerene (disambiguation)
- Scarlett Pomers (born 1988), American actress and singer-songwriter
