= St. David High School (Arizona) =

Coordinates: 31.905411°N 110.220799°W

Location
- 70 East Patton St; St. David, Arizona 85630; United States

Information
- School type: Public high school
- School district: St. David Unified School District
- CEEB code: 030360
- Principal: Andrew Brogan
- Teaching staff: 9.86 (FTE)
- Grades: 9-12
- Enrollment: 136 (2023–2024)
- Student to teacher ratio: 13.79
- Colors: Blue and gold
- Mascot: Tiger
- Website: www.stdavidschools.org

St. David High School is a high school in St. David, Arizona, in the United States. It is the only high school under the jurisdiction of the St. David Unified School District, which also includes a K-8 school. Together they have around 500 students.
