= Pantano High School =

Alternative high school in Vail, Arizona

Location
- 13010 South Houghton Road; Tucson, Arizona; United States; 32°01′03″N 110°46′30″W

Information
- Type: Public High school
- School district: Vail Unified School District
- CEEB code: 030719
- Principal: Monica Wright
- Faculty: 9.20 (FTE)
- Grades: 9-12
- Enrollment: 98 (2023–2024)
- Student to teacher ratio: 10.65
- Colors: Green and white
- Mascot: Scorpion
- Website: phs.vailschooldistrict.org

Pantano High School is an alternative high school in the Vail Unified School District. It serves students who are four or more credits behind and are at risk of failing or dropping out. Pantano is located at 13010 S. Houghton Road in Tucson, Arizona

In 2017, a sutdent was killed in a rollover crash.

== See also ==
- List of high schools in Arizona
