= Laurence Gibson =

American football player (born 1991)

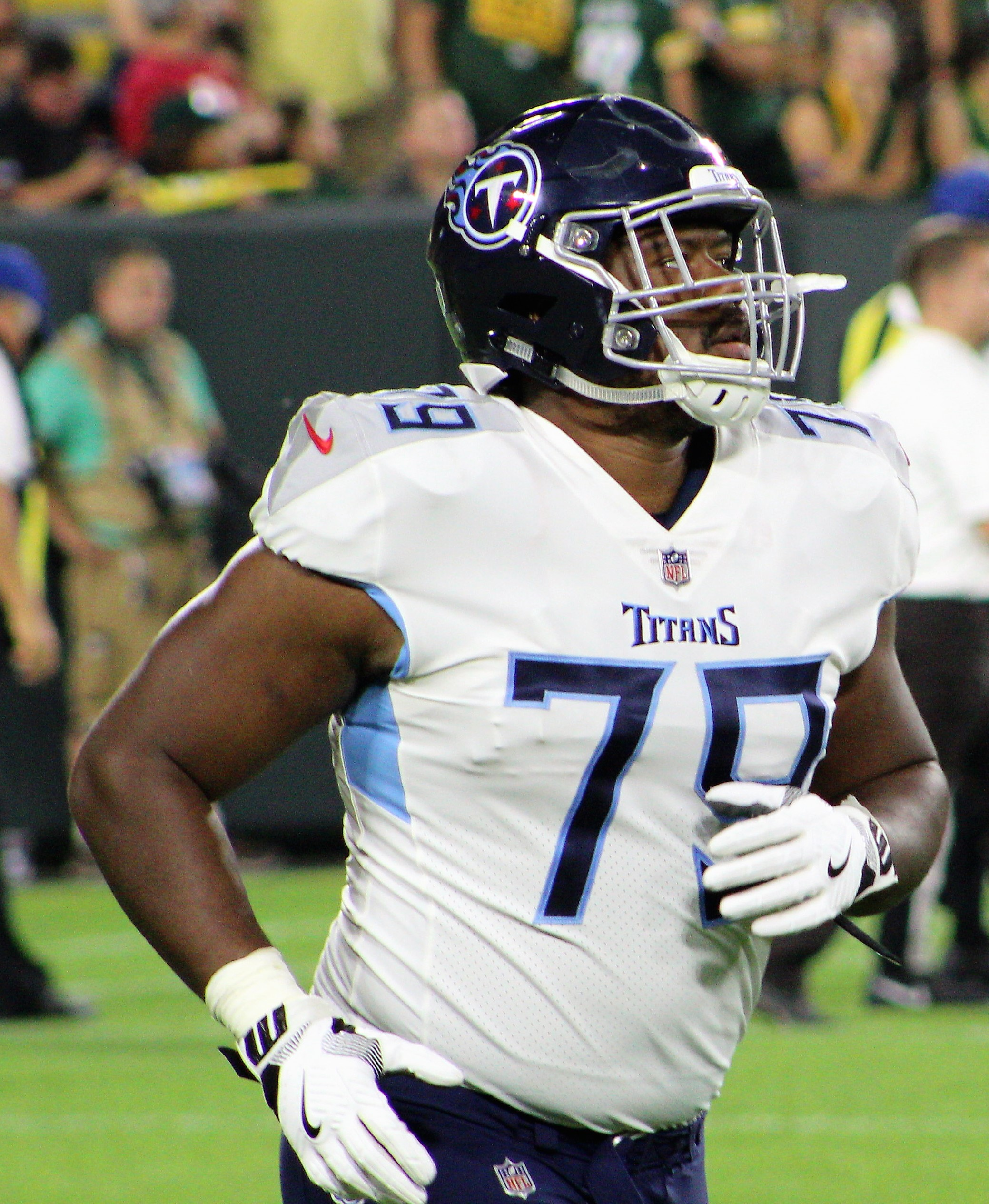
- Gibson with the Tennessee Titans in 2018

No. 79
- Position: Offensive tackle

Personal information
- Born: March 19, 1991 (age 35); Sierra Vista, Arizona, U.S.
- Listed height: 6 ft 6 in (1.98 m)
- Listed weight: 300 lb (136 kg)

Career information
- High school: Buena (AZ)
- College: Virginia Tech
- NFL draft: 2015: 7th round, 243rd overall pick

Career history
- Dallas Cowboys (2015)*; Kansas City Chiefs (2015–2016)*; Atlanta Falcons (2016)*; Chicago Bears (2016)*; New York Giants (2016)*; Houston Texans (2016–2017)*; Cleveland Browns (2017)*; New York Giants (2018)*; Tennessee Titans (2018)*
- * Offseason or practice squad member only
- Stats at Pro Football Reference

Laurence Gibson (born March 19, 1991) is an American former football offensive tackle. He played college football at Virginia Tech, and was selected by the Dallas Cowboys in the seventh round of the 2015 NFL draft.

== Early life ==
Gibson attended Buena High School, where he played two seasons as an offensive lineman and defensive end. He finished with over 100 tackles, 27 sacks, and 12 forced fumbles. He did not receive any scholarship offers after graduating from Buena High School in 2009. In fall of 2009, he attended Hargrave Military Academy and moved to offensive tackle. He became the number 1 offensive tackle and number 2 overall player in the United States (rivals.com). He received over 30 scholarship offers from NCAA Division I and Division II schools during his time at Hargrave Military Academy.

On December 17, 2009, at Hargrave Military Academy, he accepted an athletic scholarship to Virginia Tech and began his college career in January 2010. He initially started his college football career moving between guard and tackle. He settled at backup right tackle as a sophomore and played mostly on special teams, which he would continue to play for the remainder of his college career. Junior year, Gibson posted 6 starts at right tackle. He became the regular starter at left tackle as a senior. Gibson earned a B.S. Criminology in 2013, B.S. Psychology in 2014, and graduated from the Virginia Tech Police Academy.

== Professional career ==
=== Dallas Cowboys ===
Gibson was selected by the Dallas Cowboys in the seventh round (243rd overall) of the 2015 NFL draft, following an impressive NFL Scouting Combine performance. He was a top performer in 4 of 6 events at the combine, posting a 5.04 second 40-yard dash, 33.5 inch vertical jump, 9 foot 5 inch broad jump, and a 4.56 second 20-yard shuttle. After suffering a broken finger during rookie mini-camp, the surgery and recovery caused him to miss the organized team activities and the team's mini-camp.

Gibson was waived by the Cowboys on September 5 as part of final roster cuts. Dallas offered him a chance to join their practice squad, but he decided to sign with a different team.

=== Kansas City Chiefs ===
On September 6, 2015, Gibson was signed by the Kansas City Chiefs to their practice squad. He spent the entire season on the team's practice squad and was signed to a futures contract on January 16, 2016. On May 10, he was released after rookie minicamp to make room for tryout offensive lineman Zach Sterup.

=== Atlanta Falcons ===
On May 18, 2016, Gibson was signed by the Atlanta Falcons. On September 3, 2016, he was waived by the Falcons due to final roster cuts.

=== Chicago Bears ===
On September 7, 2016, Gibson was signed to the Chicago Bears' practice squad. He was cut on September 13.

=== New York Giants (first stint) ===
On September 21, 2016, Gibson was signed to the New York Giants' practice squad, because the team was experiencing a shortage of offensive linemen. On December 13, he was released by the team to make room for offensive lineman Adam Gettis.

=== Houston Texans ===
On December 14, 2016, Gibson was signed to the Houston Texans' practice squad. He signed a reserve/future contract with the Texans on January 16, 2017. He was waived on September 2, 2017.

=== Cleveland Browns ===
On December 13, 2017, Gibson was signed to the Cleveland Browns' practice squad.

=== New York Giants (second stint) ===
On January 9, 2018, Gibson signed a futures contract with the Giants. He chose not to join the team for any of the voluntary off-season programs and subsequently he was waived on May 11, 2018.

=== Tennessee Titans ===
On August 3, 2018, Gibson signed with the Tennessee Titans. He was waived on September 1, 2018.

== Personal life ==
In February 2017, Gibson along with former contractor for the U. S. Department of Defense at the Pentagon Joseph Bushrod, founded SolEnergy. SolEnergy is a residential and commercial solar panel installation company where Gibson sits as the active chief financial officer.
