= Sierra Vista Unified School District =

School district in Arizona, United States

Address
- 3305 East Fry Boulevard Sierra Vista, Cochise, Arizona, 85635; United States
- Coordinates: 31°33′20″N 110°15′52″W

District information
- Type: Public
- Motto: Achieving Excellence Together
- Grades: PK-12
- Established: 1956; 70 years ago
- President: Yulonda Boutte
- Vice-president: Connie Johnson
- Superintendent: Dr. Eric Holmes
- School board: 5 Members: Kimberly Robinson; Connie Johnson; Yulonda Boutte; Hollie Sheriff; Joy Mims
- Schools: Elementary 6 Middle 1 High 1
- Budget: $42,015,000 (2016-2017)
- NCES District ID: 0401460

Students and staff
- Students: 5,589 (2018-2019)
- Teachers: 275.00 (FTE)
- Staff: 644.93 (FTE)
- Student–teacher ratio: 20.32

Other information
- Schedule: https://svusd68.org/District/Events/
- Website: www.svusd68.org

The Sierra Vista Unified School District is the school district for Sierra Vista, Arizona. It operates Buena High School, Joyce Clark Middle School, and six elementary schools in its service area.

The district serves high school aged dependent children on Fort Huachuca.

== Demographics ==
According to the National Center for Education Statistics, Sierra Vista Unified School District serves a community of 48,526 people with a Median Household Income of $59,450.

22.4% of the families in the Sierra Vista USD live below the poverty level. Total households in the community is 20,382.

Race/Ethnicity of Sierra Vista USD:

- White: 57%
- Hispanic or Latino (of any race): 28%
- Black: 5%
- Asian: 4%
- American Indian/Alaskan Native: 1%
- Hawaiian and Other Pacific Islander: 1%
- Two or More Races: 4%

== Schools ==
Secondary schools:

- Buena High School
- Joyce Clark Middle School

Elementary schools:

- Bella Vista Elementary School
- Carmichael Elementary School
- Huachuca Mountain Elementary School
- Pueblo Del Sol Elementary School
- Town & Country Elementary School
- Village Meadows Elementary School

== See also ==
- List of school districts in Arizona
