= Alonzo Highsmith =

American football player and executive (born 1965)

New England Patriots
- Title: Personnel executive

Personal information
- Born: February 26, 1965 (age 61); Bartow, Florida, U.S.
- Listed height: 6 ft 1 in (1.85 m)
- Listed weight: 234 lb (106 kg)

Career information
- Position: Running back (No. 32)
- High school: Christopher Columbus (Miami, Florida)
- College: Miami (FL)
- NFL draft: 1987: 1st round, 3rd overall pick

Career history

Playing
- Houston Oilers (1987–1989); Dallas Cowboys (1990–1991); Tampa Bay Buccaneers (1991–1992); Kansas City Chiefs (1993)*
- * Offseason or practice squad member only

Operations
- Green Bay Packers (2012–2017) Senior personnel executive; Cleveland Browns (2018–2019) Vice president of player personnel; Seattle Seahawks (2020–2022) Personnel; Miami (FL) (2022–2023) GM of Football Operations; New England Patriots (2024–present) Personnel executive

Awards and highlights
- National champion (1983)

Career NFL statistics
- Rushing yards: 1,195
- Rushing average: 4.2
- Rushing touchdowns: 7
- Stats at Pro Football Reference

Alonzo Walter Highsmith, Sr. (born February 26, 1965) is an American football executive, former fullback, and former boxer who is the senior personnel executive for the New England Patriots. He served as the vice president of player personnel for the Cleveland Browns from 2018 to 2019. Before that, Highsmith served as a senior personnel executive for the Green Bay Packers for six seasons from 2012 to 2017. He also played in the NFL for the Houston Oilers, Dallas Cowboys, and Tampa Bay Buccaneers. He played college football for the Miami Hurricanes.

== Early life ==
Highsmith attended Christopher Columbus High School, where he played defensive end and helped his team reach the state championship final in 1982, while receiving All-American, Florida high school Defensive Player of the Year and the Dade County Athlete of the Year honors. He also played basketball and ran track.

== College career ==
Highsmith accepted a scholarship from the University of Miami over offers from Notre Dame University and the University of Michigan. Although he was recruited by Howard Schnellenberger to play defense, he was converted to fullback before his freshman season started. He was a member of the 1983 Hurricanes squad that won the national championship, and led the team in rushing during the 31–30 victory over Nebraska in the Orange Bowl.

In 1984, Jimmy Johnson arrived as the new head coach and named him a starter as a sophomore, rushing for a team leading 906 yards on 146 carries (6.2 average) and 11 touchdowns. One of the hardest working players on the team, he would develop into a complete fullback that could run, block and catch.

As a junior, he registered 451 rushing yards on 117 carries (3.9 average) and 6 touchdowns, including a school record 88-yard touchdown reception against East Carolina University. In his last year, he was recognized as the nation's best fullback, while posting 442 rushing yards (led the team) on 105 carries (4.2 average) and 8 touchdowns.

Highsmith finished his college career with 1,914 rushing yards (second in school history), 2,935 all-purpose yards (fifth in school history), 25 career touchdowns (tied for first in school history) and five 100-yard rushing games (tied for second in school history).

In 1997, he was inducted into the University of Miami Sports Hall of Fame.

== College statistics ==
Legend
**Bold**	Career high

Year	Team	Games	Rushing				Receiving			
Year	Team	GP	Att	Yds	Avg	TD	Rec	Yds	Avg	TD
1983	Miami (FL)	11	19	74	3.9	0	4	18	4.5	0
1984	Miami (FL)	**12**	**146**	**906**	**6.2**	**9**	**37**	257	6.9	2
1985	Miami (FL)	11	117	451	3.9	5	21	286	13.6	1
1986	Miami (FL)	11	105	442	4.2	4	30	**416**	**13.9**	**4**
		45	387	1,873	4.8	18	92	977	10.6	7

== Professional career ==
Pre-draft measurables
Height	Weight	Arm length	Hand span	Vertical jump	Broad jump	Bench press
6 ft 0 7/8 in (1.85 m)	236 lb (107 kg)	33 in (0.84 m)	9 1/2 in (0.24 m)	34.0 in (0.86 m)	9 ft 10 in (3.00 m)	27 reps
All values from NFL Combine

=== Houston Oilers ===
Highsmith was selected by the Houston Oilers in the first round (third overall) of the 1987 NFL draft. He reported to the team after a long contract holdout, that saw him miss 6 months and 6 games. As a rookie, he played in 8 games (3 starts) and registered 106 rushing yards.

In 1988, he started 16 games, rushing for 466 yards (third on the team) on 94 carries for a 5-yard average, while developing into one of the best blocking fullbacks in the NFL. In 1989, he started again 16 games, led the team in rushing with 531 yards and was second on the team with 6 total touchdowns.

During the 1990 season, Jack Pardee became the new Oilers head coach and implemented the run and shoot offense. The team decided that Highsmith wasn't a good fit for new system. On September 3, he was traded to the Dallas Cowboys in exchange for a second round (#38-Darryll Lewis) and a fifth round (#136-Tim Roberts) draft choice.

=== Dallas Cowboys ===
Although he had started 40 straight games with the Houston Oilers, he had a series of offseason knee surgeries that had doctors recommending against the Dallas Cowboys acquiring him in 1990. Head coach Jimmy Johnson, knowing Highsmith from his playing days at the University of Miami, ignored the medical advice regarding a potentially career-ending knee condition and went ahead with the proposed trade on September 3.

He played in 7 games (5 starts) as the lead blocker for rookie Emmitt Smith before being placed on the injured reserve list after not being able to fully recover from his previous knee surgery. He had 19 carries for 48 yards and 3 receptions for 13 yards.

The next year, he had a contract holdout, that forced him to miss most of training camp. He returned as the third-string fullback and played in only 2 games, before being waived on October 1, 1991.

=== Tampa Bay Buccaneers ===
On October 3, 1991, Highsmith was claimed off waivers by the Tampa Bay Buccaneers. Due to his chronic knee condition, he was released on October 7, 1992.

Highsmith retired after playing in 65 games, posting 283 rushing attempts for 1,195 yards (4.2 avg.) and 7 touchdowns. He also had 42 receptions for 428 yards (10.2 avg.) and 3 touchdowns.

== Boxing career ==
Following his football career, Highsmith became a professional boxer. Over a four-year career, Highsmith amassed a 27–1–2 record in the heavyweight division. Twenty three of those victories came by way of knockout.

One of Highsmith's opponents in professional boxing was another former NFL player turned boxer, Mark Gastineau.

== Front office ==
In 2012, he accepted a senior personnel executive position in the front office of the Green Bay Packers.

On January 2, 2018, it was reported that he would be joining the Cleveland Browns as their vice president of football operations. On January 10, it was confirmed that Highsmith would join the Browns, just as the Vice President of Player Personnel.

After consulting for the Seattle Seahawks in the 2020 offseason, he accepted a full-time position as a personnel executive with the team on June 12, 2020.

On May 26, 2022, Highsmith was hired by the Miami Hurricanes to serve as the general manager of football operations.

On February 7, 2024, he was hired by the New England Patriots to serve as a personnel executive.

== Personal life ==
His father, Walter Highsmith, was a successful football player and coach. Like Alonzo, he also played for the Oilers, suiting up for them in 1972. He also played for the Montreal Alouettes, with Alonzo playing football and basketball in Montreal as a teenager. Walter was a former head coach for Texas Southern University and enjoyed several coaching stints in college football and the CFL.

One of Highsmith's sons, also named Alonzo Highsmith Jr., was invited to training camp with the Miami Dolphins, Kansas City Chiefs and the Washington Redskins. Highsmith's cousin, Ali Highsmith, played for the Arizona Cardinals.
