= Hookers Hot Springs, Arizona =

- Hot spring
- Location in Arizona
- Coordinates: 32°20′19″N 110°14′22″W
- Country: United States
- State: Arizona
- County: Cochise
- Elevation: 4,062 ft (1,238 m)
- Time zone: UTC-7 (Mountain (MST))
  - Summer (DST): UTC-7 (MST)
- GNIS feature ID: 5926

Hookers Hot Springs is a hot spring in Cochise County, Arizona, United States.

The springs are located the southern foothills of the Galiuro Mountains, and has been described as "beautifully situated, commanding an extended view of valley and mountain scenery".

Several hot springs are located nearby, and the 127 °F (53 °C) water is reputed to have health benefits.

== History ==
A ranch on which Hookers Hot Springs is located was established in the 1860s.

In 1905, author Joseph Amasa Munk described how the spring water was "conducted through pipes into the bath house, where it supplies a row of bath-tubs with water of any desired temperature". Visitors would bathe in the spring water, or drink it for its reputed benefits. Muck described how "locally, these springs have become famous because of the remarkable cures they have effected".

The hot spring is now located on the Muleshoe Ranch, and is co-managed by The Nature Conservancy, the Bureau of Land Management, and the Coronado National Forest.
