= Hilltop, Arizona =

- Populated place
- Location within the state of Arizona Hilltop (the United States)
- Coordinates: 31°59′40″N 109°16′39″W
- Country: United States
- State: Arizona
- County: Cochise
- Elevation: 5,702 ft (1,738 m)
- Time zone: UTC-7 (Mountain (MST))
  - Summer (DST): UTC-7 (MST)
- Area code: 520
- FIPS code: 04-33070
- GNIS feature ID: 5831

Hilltop is a ghost town situated in Cochise County, Arizona, United States. Hilltop was established in the 1880s and was a successful mining town in the 1900s. Their economy declined steadily until the 1940s when it became a ghost town. The Hilltop Post office was erected on June 26, 1920, serving the local community. Hilltop has an estimated elevation of 5,702 feet (1,738 m) above sea level in the Chiricahua Mountains near the Arizona–New Mexico state line.
