= Empire High School =

Location
- 10701 E. Mary Ann Cleveland Way; Tucson, Arizona; United States; 32°05′17″N 110°45′49″W

Information
- Type: Public High school
- Motto: Culture-Rich, Innovative, Challenging
- Established: 2005 (21 years ago)
- School district: Vail Unified School District
- CEEB code: 030601
- Principal: Matt Donaldson
- Teaching staff: 43.49 (FTE)
- Grades: 9-12
- Enrollment: 888 (2023–2024)
- Student to teacher ratio: 20.42
- Colors: Black and red
- Mascot: Raven
- Website: ehs.vailschooldistrict.org

Empire High School, also known as EHS, is a public high school in the Vail Unified School District in Tucson, Arizona. It is the first public high school in the United States to use all-wireless laptop technology and fully digital (no textbooks) curriculum resources.

== History ==
Empire opened to students in August 2005 as the first one-to-one laptop, textbook free, comprehensive high school in the nation. Empire graduated its first class in 2007.

Empire High School was named an "Apple Distinguished School" for the 2007-2008 and 2008-2009 school years. In the 2010-2011 school year, Empire was distinguished as an A+ school, and it earned that title again in the 2014-2015, 2018-2019, and 2023-2024 school years. Additionally, during the 2024-2025 school year, Empire was announced to be the first school in the state by the ASBA (Arizona School Boards Association.)

== Athletics ==
Empire hosts a wide variety of athletics, including football, track and field, baseball, softball, golf, volleyball, cheer, soccer, basketball and cross country. In the 2009-2010 and 2012-2013 school years, Empire's baseball team went on to the state finals. Starting in the 2012-2013 school year, students from Andrada Polytechnic High School began to compete in athletics as members of Empire's teams, moving most of Empire's teams up in divisions. In the 2014-2015 school year, Empire's softball team became the Arizona State Champions in their division, which was the first time in Empire history that one of their sports teams had earned that title. In 2017 Empire won the state softball championship; its second title in that sport and second overall for the school.

== Fine Arts ==
Empire's fine arts programs include classes and extracurricular activities focusing on guitars, choir, pop symphony, art (including an AP class on drawing), steel drums, photography, ceramics, theatre, and technical theatre. The fine arts programs at Empire have been recognized as some of the top programs in the state. The Empire Drama Department has won countless superior awards in a variety of categories at competitions across the state, and has earned the chance to go to Nationals for their one-act plays in the 2013-2014 and 2022-2023 school years. They were named the State Champions in One Acts, took 4th place for their category at the Musical Theatre Competitions of America in California, and also won the award for Best Musical in Tucson for their performance of Urinetown all in the 2014-2015 school year.
