= Sentinel Elementary School District =

School district in Arizona, United States

Sentinel School District 71

Location
- 53802 West Old US Hwy 80; Dateland, Arizona 85333 United States

Other information
- Website: www.sentinelesd.org

Sentinel Elementary School District No. 71 is a public school district based in the unincorporated community of Sentinel in Maricopa County, Arizona, United States. Its mailing address is officially in Dateland, Arizona, which is in Yuma County.

Average (estimated) teacher salary in 2022 fiscal year is $60,372.
