= McNeal, Arizona =

Unincorporated community in the state of Arizona, United States

- Census-designated place
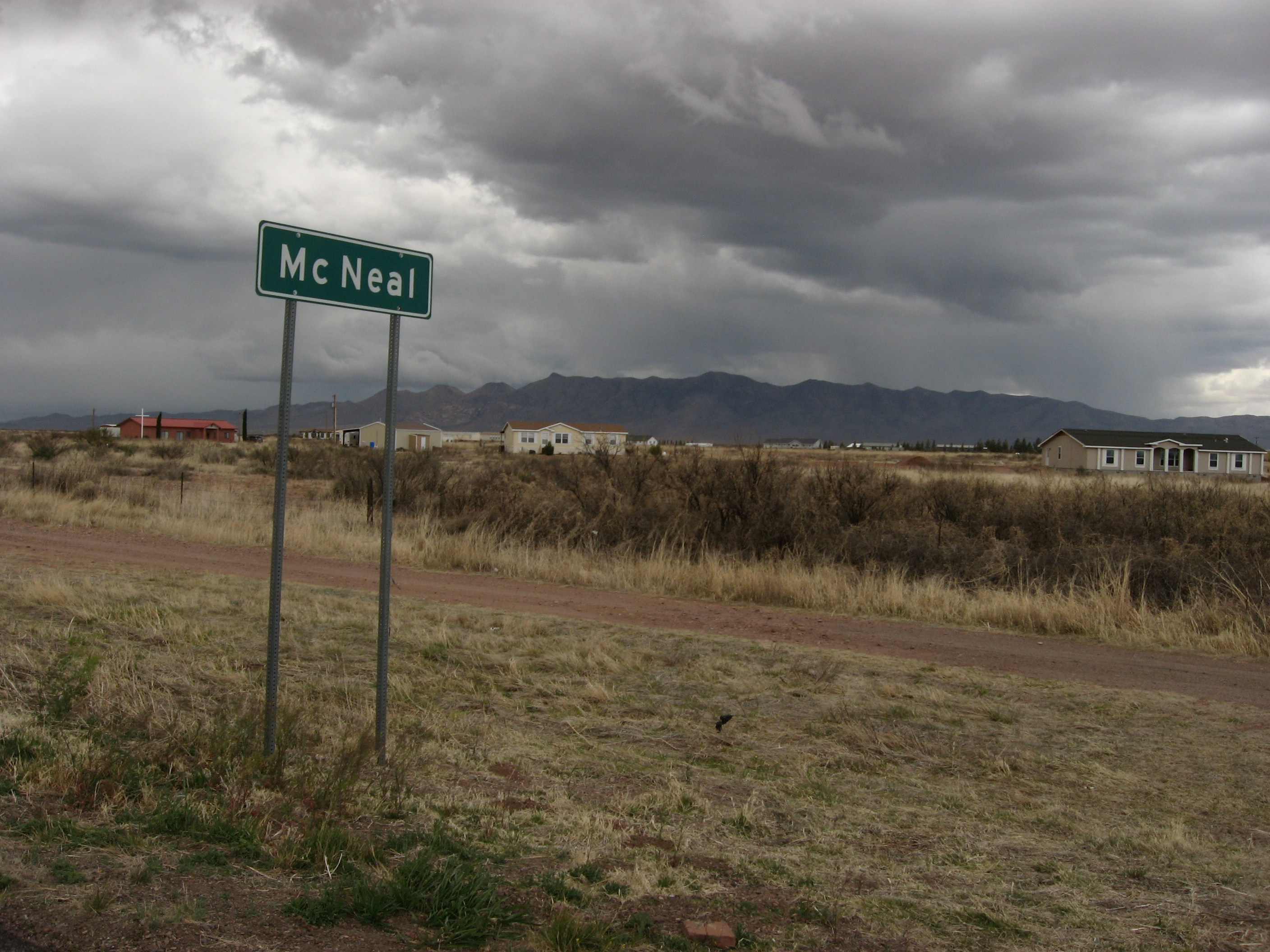

- Location of McNeal in Cochise County, Arizona.

- Location within Arizona Location within the United States
- Coordinates: 31°36′28″N 109°40′12″W
- Country: United States
- State: Arizona
- County: Cochise

Area
  - Total: 3.75 sq mi (9.71 km^{2})
  - Land: 3.75 sq mi (9.71 km^{2})
  - Water: 0 sq mi (0.00 km^{2})
- Elevation: 4,164 ft (1,269 m)

Population (2020)
  - Total: 182
  - Density: 48.6/sq mi (18.75/km^{2})
- Time zone: UTC-7 (Mountain (MST))
- ZIP code: 85617
- Area code: 520
- GNIS feature ID: 2582820

McNeal is an unincorporated community and census-designated place in Cochise County, Arizona, United States. As of the 2020 census it had a population of 182. McNeal is located on U.S. Route 191, 21 miles (34 km) northwest of Douglas. McNeal has the United States Postal Service zip code of 85617.

== Demographics ==
Historical population
Census	Pop.	Note	%±
2010	238		—
2020	182		−23.5%
U.S. Decennial Census

== Climate ==
According to the Köppen Climate Classification system, McNeal has a semi-arid climate, abbreviated "BSk" on climate maps.
