= Cochise Elementary School District =

School district in Arizona, United States

Address
- 5025 North Bowie Avenue Cochise, Arizona, 85606; United States

District information
- Type: Public
- Grades: K–8
- NCES District ID: 0402130

Students and staff
- Teachers: 9.25
- Staff: 10.38

Other information
- Website: www.cochiseschool.org

Cochise School District 26 is a school district in Cochise County, Arizona.
