= Pearce Elementary School District =

School district in Arizona, United States

Address
- 1487 East School Road Pearce, Arizona, 85625; United States

District information
- Type: Public
- Grades: PreK–8
- NCES District ID: 0406150

Students and staff
- Students: 108
- Teachers: 5.5
- Staff: 13.3
- Student–teacher ratio: 19.64

Other information
- Website: www.pearceschool.org

Pearce School District 22 is a school district in Cochise County, Arizona.
