= Quartzsite Elementary School District =

School district in La Paz County, Arizona, United States

Coordinates: 33.648°N 114.357°W

Address
- 49241 Ehrenberg-Parker Highway Ehrenberg, Arizona, 85334; United States

District information
- Type: Public
- Grades: PreK–8
- NCES District ID: 0406780

Students and staff
- Students: 178
- Teachers: 8.0
- Staff: 20.3
- Student–teacher ratio: 22.25

Other information
- Website: www.qsd4.org

Quartzsite Elementary School District 4 is a school district in La Paz County, Arizona, United States.

There are two elementary schools in the district:

- Quartzsite Elementary, 930 Quail Trail, Quartzsite, Arizona
- Ehrenberg Elementary, 49241 Ehrenberg Parker Rd, Ehrenberg, Arizona
