= Double Adobe Elementary School District =

School district in Arizona, United States

Address
- 7081 North Central Highway McNeal, Arizona, 85617; United States

District information
- Type: Public
- Grades: PreK–8
- NCES District ID: 0402490

Students and staff
- Students: 26
- Teachers: 3.0
- Staff: 5.25
- Student–teacher ratio: 8.67

Other information
- Website: www.doubleadobeschool.org

Double Adobe School District 45 is a school district in Cochise County, Arizona.
