= Apache Elementary School District =

School district in Arizona, United States

Address
- 10488 East Skeleton Canyon Road Portal, Arizona, 85632; United States

District information
- Type: Public
- Grades: K–8
- NCES District ID: 0400750

Students and staff
- Students: 4
- Teachers: 0.0
- Staff: 4.0

Other information
- Website: www.apacheelementary.org

The Apache Elementary School District is a school district with a single one-room school, Apache Elementary School (AES), in rural Cochise County, Arizona.

== History ==
In 1910 the school was established. The current building opened circa 1969. Sometime prior to 2019 the Cochise County School Superintendent considered having the school district closed, but changed her mind upon seeing the operation of the school. In 2019 the number of students was 10, and there was an employee who served as principal, superintendent, and teacher.

== See also ==
- Non-high school district
