= San Fernando Elementary School District =

School district in Pima County, Arizona

San Fernando School District 35

Location
- PO Box 80; Sasabe, Arizona 85633 United States

Other information
- Website: www.sanfernando35.org

San Fernando School District 35 is a public school district based in Pima County, Arizona, United States.
