= Solomon Elementary School District =

School district in Arizona, United States

Address
- 2250 South Stevens Avenue Solomon, Arizona, 85551; United States

District information
- Type: Public
- Grades: PreK–8
- NCES District ID: 0407860

Students and staff
- Students: 160
- Teachers: 10.0
- Staff: 12.65
- Student–teacher ratio: 16.0

Other information
- Website: solomon.k12.az.us

Solomonville School District 5 is a school district in Graham County, Arizona
