= Cross Rail Ranch =

Property in Cochise County, Arizona

The Cross Rail Ranch is a 22,000-acre (89 km^{2}) property on the US-Mexico border near Douglas, Arizona, and a prominent location in the legal controversy surrounding illegal immigration from Mexico into the United States. The Washington Times has stated that the ranch "is known by federal and county law enforcement authorities as 'the avenue of choice' for immigrants seeking to enter the United States illegally."

The ranch is owned by Roger (R.E.) Barnett, who has been sued twice by the Mexican American Legal Defense and Education Fund (MALDEF) for detaining and harassing Latinos discovered on public property near his ranch, including several who were U.S. citizens. Although no criminal charges were made, Barnett was made to pay damages to plaintiffs in both cases.
