= Cienega High School =

Secondary school in Pima County, Arizona

Location
- 12775 E Mary Ann Cleveland Way; Vail, Arizona 85641; United States; 32°03′26″N 110°43′17″W

Information
- Type: Public secondary (U.S.)
- Established: 2001 (25 years ago)
- Oversight: Vail Unified
- CEEB code: 030541
- Staff: 104.10 (FTE)
- Grades: 9–12
- Enrollment: 1,872 (2023–2024)
- Student to teacher ratio: 17.98
- Colors: Copper and navy
- Athletics conference: AIA 5A
- Mascot: Bobcat
- Website: chs.vailschooldistrict.org

Cienega High School (also known as CHS) is a public high school in Pima County, Arizona. It opened in the fall of 2001 with approximately 400 students (freshmen and sophomores). It is a member of the Arizona Interscholastic Association's 5A Conference.

== History ==
Cienega High School opened its doors in 2001 as the first comprehensive high school in the Vail Unified School District. It is the largest high school in Vail.

=== Softball hazing incident ===
In 2016, eight students on Cienega High School's softball team were suspended after attempting to haze new varsity members at an away game. They purportedly filled a trash can with ice, water, and urine as the team was staying at a motel in February 2016 and placed it near a door with the expectation that it would drench the new members. Once the incident was reported, the principal at the time suspended the four students who were directly involved for five days and the other four for two days for being aware of the prank but not reporting it. He was quoted as saying, "We will not tolerate pranks. We will not tolerate bullying. We will not tolerate hazing or any kind of harassment."

=== Sexual misconduct ===
In 2018, Senecca Turner, an assistant basketball coach and member of the security staff at the high school, was arrested on suspicion of sexual misconduct with a teen. School officials had been informed that Turner has been sending explicit messages to a 17-year-old female student. He was sentenced the following year to serve 10 years probation, 12 weekends in the Pima County Jail, one thousand hours of community service, and must register as a sex offender.

=== LDS Seminary ===
In the spring of 2025, the Vail School Board unanimously approved the Church of Jesus Christ of Latter-day Saints (LDS Church) to construct a seminary on school grounds. When questioned on the purpose and legality of the construction of this building, Vail School District’s Director of Communications and Public Affairs clarified that no property tax money was going into the building. “At all of our campuses we have clubs for the Fellowship of Christian Students. Now that’s completely legal because first of all, it’s the students choice to participate right? And we’re not forcing anyone to participate. It’s just being made available to students with those beliefs and that’s the same thing we’re doing here," Mentone explained when questioned about the separation of church and state. Construction was estimated to be completed by January 1, 2026.

The seminary faced mixed reactions during construction. In April 2025, the construction of the seminary was canceled. The nonprofit advocacy group Secular AZ took legal action against the district due to a concern of blurring the lines between church and state. In response, Legal Director for Secular said "This is a public high school, not a platform for religious proselytizing. We had to act ― and we did." The Vail School District informed the public via Facebook that the LDS Church had issued a formal written notice to exercise their contractual right to terminate the agreement between the school and the church.

== Extracurriculars ==
=== Fine arts ===
- Copper Thunder Marching Band
- Choir
- Drama club

=== Sports programs ===
- Varsity football
- JV football
- Freshman/sophomore football
- Girls golf
- Boys golf
- Volleyball
- Swim & dive
- Cross country

== Commitment to Graduate program ==
The Commitment to Graduate program, or C2G, was made to address the increasing rate of high school students dropping out before graduating in the United States.

== Notable alumni ==
- Seth Mejias-Brean (class of 2009), former Major League Baseball infielder for the San Diego Padres
- Andre Jackson (class of 2014), baseball pitcher for the Yokohama DeNA BayStars of Nippon Professional Baseball; formerly for the Los Angeles Dodgers and Pittsburgh Pirates
- Isaiah Murphy (class of 2016), professional basketball player for Hiroshima Dragonflies
- Nick Gonzales (class of 2017), MLB baseball infielder for the Pittsburgh Pirates
