= Redington Elementary School District =

School district in Arizona, United States

Redington School District 44

Location
- PO Box 2270; Tucson, Arizona 85702 United States

Redington School District 44 is a public school district based in Pima County, Arizona.
