= Oracle Elementary School District =

School district in Arizona, United States

Address
- 725 North Carpenter Drive Oracle, Arizona, 85623; United States

District information
- Type: Public
- Grades: PreK–8
- NCES District ID: 0405640

Students and staff
- Students: 366
- Teachers: 26.0
- Staff: 36.03
- Student–teacher ratio: 14.08

Other information
- Website: www.osd2.org

Oracle School District 2 is a school district in Pinal County, Arizona. Oracle School District 2 Operates one school. Mountain Vista School
