= McNeal Elementary School District =

School district in Arizona, United States

Address
- 3979 McNeal Street McNeal, Arizona, 85617; United States

District information
- Type: Public
- Grades: K–8
- NCES District ID: 0404920

Students and staff
- Students: 42
- Teachers: 2.0
- Staff: 8.5
- Student–teacher ratio: 21.0

Other information
- Website: www.mcnealesd.org

Mcneal School District 55 is a school district in Cochise County, Arizona.
