= Naco Elementary School District =

School district in Cochise County, Arizona

Address
- 1911 West Valenzuela Street Naco, Arizona, 85620; United States

District information
- Type: Public
- Grades: PreK–8
- NCES District ID: 0405430

Students and staff
- Students: 295
- Teachers: 17.0
- Staff: 0.0
- Student–teacher ratio: 17.35

Other information
- Website: www.naco.k12.az.us

Naco School District 23 is a school district in Cochise County, Arizona.
