= Pomerene, Arizona =

- Populated place
- Location within Arizona Location within the United States
- Coordinates: 31°59′58″N 110°17′10″W
- Country: United States
- State: Arizona
- County: Cochise
- Elevation: 3,543 ft (1,080 m)
- Time zone: UTC-7 (Mountain (MST))
- ZIP code: 85627
- Area code: 520
- GNIS feature ID: 9631

Pomerene is a populated place in Cochise County, Arizona, United States. Pomerene is 2 miles (3.2 km) north of Benson. Pomerene has the ZIP Code of 85627; according to the 2020-2024 American Community Survey 5-year estimates, ZIP Code Tabulation Area (ZCTA) 85627 had a population of 430.

== Transportation ==
Benson Area Transit provides transportation to Benson one day a week.

== Education ==
Pomerene is served by the Pomerene Elementary School District.
