= Vail Unified School District =

School district in Arizona, United States

Founded in 1903, the Vail Unified School District (often shortened to simply Vail School District) is the school district in the town of Vail, Arizona. It also serves portions of nearby Tucson, Arizona.

It operates an inclusive preschool, ten elementary schools, six middle schools, and five high schools, plus the Vail Academy and High School, a K-12 school, serving a population of more than 14,000 students from preschool to twelfth grade.

== History ==
The district began operations in 1903.

In 1999 the School Facilities Board of the State of Arizona approved funding the construction of a comprehensive high school for the district, which previously did not have one. The anticipated construction was for $24,300,000, with an expected opening time in 2001.

== Elementary schools ==
- Acacia Elementary (Tucson)
- Civano Elementary (Tucson)
- Cottonwood Elementary (Tucson)
- Desert Willow Elementary (Tucson)
- Esmond Station K-8 School (Tucson)
- Mesquite Elementary (Tucson)
- Ocotillo Ridge Elementary (unincorporated, non-census-designated Pima County)
- Senita Valley Elementary (Tucson)
- Sycamore Elementary (unincorporated, non-census-designated Pima County)
- Copper Ridge Elementary (unincorporated, non-census-designated Pima County)

== Middle schools ==
- Civano Middle School (Tucson)
- Corona Foothills Middle School (unincorporated, non-census-designated Pima County)
- Desert Sky Middle School (Tucson)
- Old Vail Middle School (unincorporated, non-census-designated Pima County)
- Rincon Vista Middle School (Tucson)
- Esmond Station K-8 School(Tucson)

== High schools ==
- Cienega High School (unincorporated, non-census-designated Pima County)
- Empire High School (Tucson)
- Pantano High School
- Andrada Polytechnic High School
- Mica Mountain High School

== K-12 schools ==
- Vail Academy and High School
