= Douglas Unified School District =

School district in Arizona, United States

Address
- 1132 East 12th Street Douglas, Arizona, 85607; United States

District information
- Type: Public
- Grades: PreK–12
- NCES District ID: 0402530

Students and staff
- Students: 3,837
- Teachers: 191.0
- Staff: 176.23
- Student–teacher ratio: 20.09

Other information
- Website: www.dusd.us

Douglas School District 27 is a school district in Cochise County, Arizona.

== Schools ==
The District includes:

- Clawson Elementary School
- Faras Elementary School
- Joe Carlson Elementary School
- Sarah Marley Elementary School
- Stevenson Elementary School
- Paul Huber Middle School
- Ray Borane Middle School
- Douglas High School
