= Valley Union High School District =

School district in Arizona, United States

Address
- 4088 West Jefferson Road Elfrida, Arizona, 85610; United States

District information
- Type: Public
- Grades: 9–12
- NCES District ID: 0408910

Students and staff
- Students: 114
- Teachers: 8.43
- Staff: 12.94
- Student–teacher ratio: 13.52

Other information
- Website: www.vuhs.net

Valley Union High School District 22 is a school district in Cochise County, Arizona.
