= Elfrida Elementary School District =

School district in Arizona, United States

Address
- 4070 West Jefferson Road Elfrida, Arizona, 85610; United States

District information
- Type: Public
- Grades: PreK–8
- NCES District ID: 0402760

Students and staff
- Students: 89
- Teachers: 9.0
- Staff: 10.25
- Student–teacher ratio: 9.89

Other information
- Website: www.elfridaschools.org

Elfrida Elementary School District 12 is a school in Cochise County, Arizona. It is a rural school located approximately one half hour north of the US/Mexico border and caters for K-8 students.

In 2002 the district had about 200 students. The district, as of 2002, receives students from the Rucker School District, which does not operate any schools.
