= St. David Unified School District =

School district in Arizona, United States

Address
- 70 East Patton Street St. David, Arizona, 85630; United States

District information
- Type: Public
- Grades: PreK–12
- NCES District ID: 0408020

Students and staff
- Students: 353
- Teachers: 18.6
- Staff: 37.38
- Student–teacher ratio: 18.98

Other information
- Website: www.stdavidschools.org

St David School District 21 is a school district in Cochise County, Arizona.

== Schools ==
The District includes:

- St. David Elementary School
- St. David High School
