= Ash Creek Elementary School District =

School district in Arizona, United States

Address
- 6460 East Highway 181 Pearce, Arizona, 85625; United States

District information
- Type: Public
- Grades: PreK–8
- NCES District ID: 0400870

Students and staff
- Students: 17
- Teachers: 2.0
- Staff: 5.44
- Student–teacher ratio: 8.5

Other information
- Website: ashcreekschool.wordpress.com

Ash Creek School District 53 is a school district in Cochise County, Arizona.
