= Palominas Elementary School District =

School district in Arizona, United States

Address
- 6849 South Highway 92 Hereford, Arizona, 85615; United States

District information
- Type: Public
- Grades: PreK–8
- NCES District ID: 0405880

Students and staff
- Students: 870
- Teachers: 48.0
- Staff: 89.04
- Student–teacher ratio: 18.12

Other information
- Website: www.psd49.net

Palominas School District 49 is a school district in Cochise County, Arizona.
