= Bowie Unified School District =

School district in Arizona, United States

Address
- 315 West 5th Street Bowie, Arizona, 85605; United States

District information
- Type: Public
- Grades: PreK–12
- NCES District ID: 0401330

Students and staff
- Students: 63
- Teachers: 6.02
- Staff: 12.99
- Student–teacher ratio: 10.47

Other information
- Website: www.bowieschools.org

Bowie School District 14 is a school district in Cochise County, Arizona.

== Schools ==
- Bowie Elementary School
- Bowie High School
