= Pomerene Elementary School District =

School district in Arizona, United States

Address
- 1396 North Old Pomerene Road Pomerene, Arizona, 85627; United States

District information
- Type: Public
- Grades: PreK–8
- NCES District ID: 0406630

Students and staff
- Students: 122
- Teachers: 7.0
- Staff: 12.25
- Student–teacher ratio: 17.43

Other information
- Website: www.pomereneschool.org

Pomerene School District 64 is a school district in Cochise County, Arizona. It serves Pomerene, Arizona.
