= Bisbee High School =

School in Cochise County, Arizona

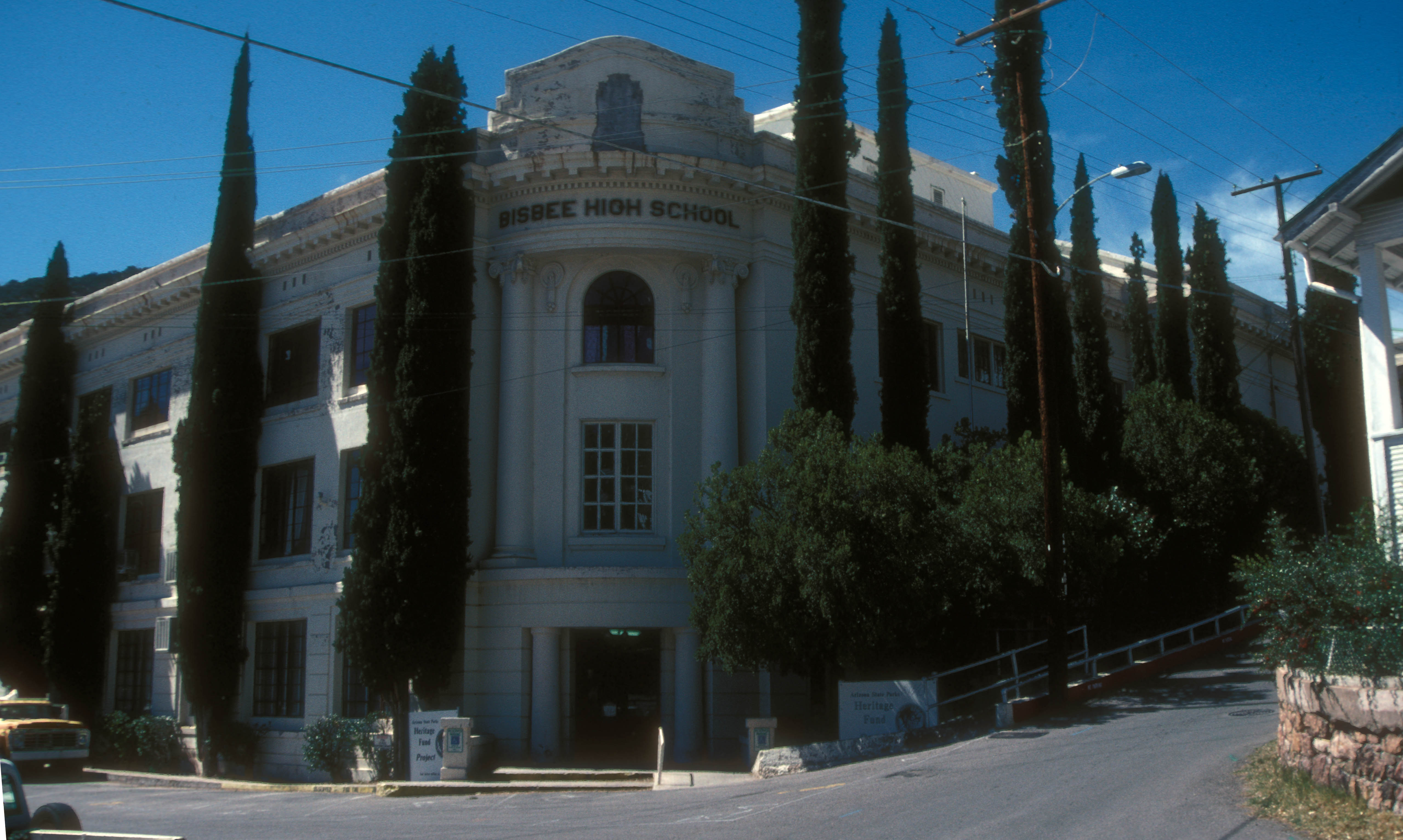
- The picture shown is of the Old High School in downtown Bisbee. It is the only four-story building in the country with a ground level entry on each floor. The entry shown is on the 2nd floor and was the main entry to the school. The first floor is under this and held the shop classes and the bus garage. The 2nd floor held the offices and general class rooms. The 3rd floor also was general classrooms while the 4th floor was the gym/auditorium. In the picture shown, there was a ground level entry halfway up for the 3rd floor, and at the top of the building was the ground level entry for the gym.

Location
- 325 School Terrace Rd; Bisbee, Arizona 85603; United States; 31°24′53″N 109°53′18″W

Information
- School type: Public high school
- School district: Bisbee Unified School District
- CEEB code: 030020
- Grades: 9-12
- Enrollment: 352 (2022–2023)
- Colors: Red and gray
- Mascot: Pumas
- Website: www.busd.k12.az.us/313205_2

Bisbee High School is a high school in Bisbee, Arizona, United States. It is part of the Bisbee Unified School District, which also operates an elementary school and a junior high school. The high school runs on a four-day school week.

== Old Bisbee High School ==
The old Bisbee High School is at 100 Old Douglas Road, Bisbee, AZ (31.4300°N 109.8919°W) Bisbee High School was designed by architect Norman F. Marsh and constructed in 1914. It housed around 450 students a year until closing in the late fifties after the construction of a new high school. The building is three stories and is noted for having a ground-level entrance on each floor. After closing as a high school, the building began to serve as offices for Cochise County, such as the district library, the health department for a time, and for elections, and adult probation services. Today, the building is vacant and waiting to be renovated into an apartment complex. During some recent construction, the job supervisor was shot and killed by a disgruntled former employee outside the Old Bisbee High School. It appears the matter is still under investigation.

== New Bisbee High School ==
The current school was built in 1957/58 at 325 School Terrace Road, Bisbee, Arizona. The campus was designed by Edward L. Varney Associates of Phoenix. The construction contract to build the new campus was awarded to D. O. Norton & Son Construction Co. and Mullen Construction Co. both of Phoenix.
