= St. Johns Unified School District =

School district in Apache County, Arizona

Address
- 450 South 13th West St Johns, Arizona, 85936; United States

District information
- Type: Public
- Grades: PreK–12
- NCES District ID: 0408080

Students and staff
- Students: 835
- Teachers: 52.87
- Staff: 82.01
- Student–teacher ratio: 15.79

Other information
- Website: www.sjusd.net

St. Johns Unified School District (SJUSD) is a school district headquartered in St. Johns, Arizona.

The district's schools include Coronado Elementary School, St. Johns Middle School, and St. Johns High School.

In 2019 most grade levels in the district had AzMERIT scores above grade level.

From 2020 to 2021 the number of students in the district declined by 5%.
