= San Simon Unified School District =

School district in Arizona, United States

Address
- 2226 West I-10 Business Loop San Simon, Arizona, 85632; United States

District information
- Type: Public
- Grades: K–12
- NCES District ID: 0407430

Students and staff
- Students: 113
- Teachers: 11.5
- Staff: 13.9
- Student–teacher ratio: 9.83

Other information
- Website: www.sansimon.org

San Simon School District 18 is a school district in Cochise County, Arizona.
