= Willcox Unified School District =

School district in Arizona, US

Address
- 480 North Bisbee Avenue Willcox, Arizona, 85643; United States

District information
- Type: Public
- Grades: PreK–12
- NCES District ID: 0409250

Students and staff
- Students: 1,023
- Teachers: 70.56
- Staff: 75.75
- Student–teacher ratio: 14.5

Other information
- Website: www.wusd13.org

The Willcox Unified School District is the school district for Willcox, Arizona and the surrounding areas. It operates an elementary school, a middle school, and Willcox High School.
