= PUSD =

PUSD may refer to:

== Organisations ==
- United Social Democratic Party (Partido Unido Social Democrático), a political party in Guinea-Bissau

== School districts ==
=== Arizona ===
- Page Unified School District
- Parker Unified School District
- Payson Unified School District
- Peoria Unified School District
- Pima Unified School District
- Piñon Unified School District
- Prescott Unified School District

=== California ===
- Paramount Unified School District
- Pasadena Unified School District
- Piedmont Unified School District
- Pittsburg Unified School District
- Pleasanton Unified School District
- Plumas Unified School District
- Pomona Unified School District
- Porterville Unified School District
- Poway Unified School District
