= Western Arizona Vocational Education =

School district in Arizona, United States

Western Arizona Vocational District #50

Location
- PO Box 7000; Kingman, Arizona 86402 United States

Other information
- Website: www.wavejted.org

Western Arizona Vocational Education is a joint technological education district based in Mohave County, Arizona, United States. It incorporates four school districts in Mohave and La Paz counties.

== Member school districts ==
- Colorado River Union High School District
- Kingman Unified School District
- Lake Havasu Unified School District
- Parker Unified School District
