= Forest Lakes, Arizona =

Unincorporated community in the state of Arizona, United States

- CDP
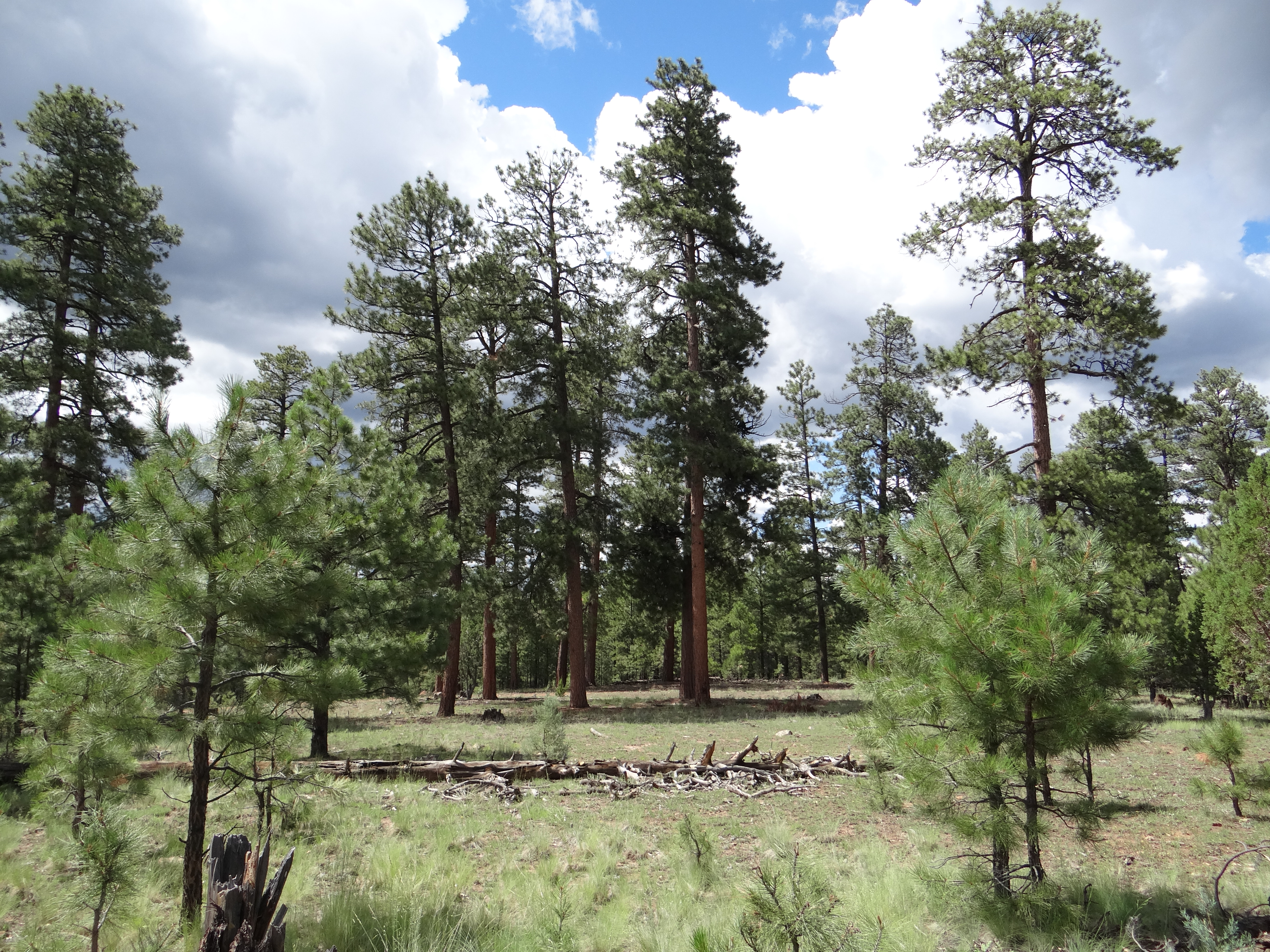
- Ponderosa forest near Forest Lakes, AZ

- Location in Coconino County and the state of Arizona

- Location in Arizona Location in United States Location in North America
- Coordinates: 34°20′15″N 110°48′53″W
- Country: United States
- State: Arizona
- County: Coconino
- Settled: 1939

Area
  - Total: 10.54 sq mi (27.29 km^{2})
  - Land: 10.54 sq mi (27.29 km^{2})
  - Water: 0 sq mi (0.00 km^{2})
- Elevation: 7,582 ft (2,311 m)

Population (2020)
  - Total: 155
  - Density: 14.7/sq mi (5.68/km^{2})
- Time zone: UTC−7 (MST (no DST))
- ZIP code: 85931
- Area code: 928
- FIPS code: 04-24125
- GNIS ID(s): 2805230

Forest Lakes is a small unincorporated community in Coconino County in the northern part of the U.S. state of Arizona. It is located on the edge of the Mogollon Rim and is in close proximity to several recreational lakes within the Apache-Sitgreaves National Forest, and is named for such.

== History ==
The area that would become Forest Lakes began as a mining operation in 1939 when the Denison family began mining manganese in the area. Heavy demand for the metal from the United States federal government helped ensure steady mining operations into the 1960s, when the family turned to logging to sustain their income.

In May 1964, the land was subdivided into the first Forest Lakes Estates subdivision unit, and the homeowners association, the Forest Lakes Owners Association, was organized.

With the construction of numerous recreational lakes in the area, demand for vacation homes grew and spurred the creation of 10 additional units to the subdivision, with the last being created in May 1969.

=== Rodeo-Chediski Fire ===
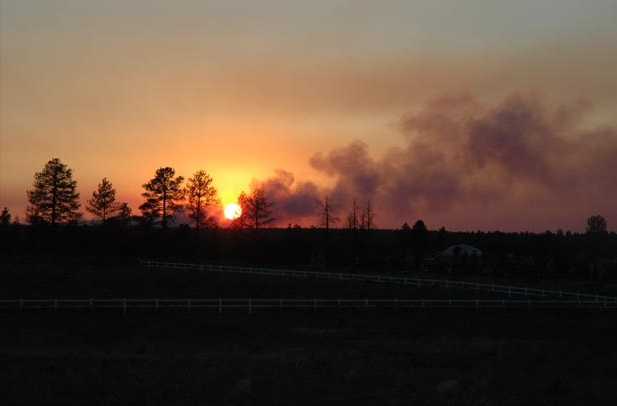
Rodeo-Chediski Fire, Bison Ranch

On the afternoon of June 18, 2002, a fire - later determined to be set by an arsonist - was spotted near Cibecue, 27 miles (43 km) southeast of Forest Lakes. While the fire rapidly grew to cover 10,000 acres (4,000 ha), there was no immediate threat to the Forest Lakes area.

Two days later on June 20, a stranded hiker who had been lost for 3 days set a signal fire to get the attention of news helicopters that had been covering the Rodeo Fire. While the hiker was rescued, the signal fire unexpectedly grew in the dry conditions and quickly flared up. The resultant blaze, the Chediski Fire, was considerably closer, 14 miles (23 km) south of Forest Lakes.

On June 22, the fires combined and moved further northward, threatening several communities including Show Low, Heber-Overgaard and Pinetop-Lakeside. Forest Lakes, also threatened, was evacuated at 1:00 PM that afternoon. The blaze moved to within 0.5 miles (0.80 km) of Forest Lakes on June 28, but efforts to save the community prevailed and no homes in the settlement were damaged.

== Geography ==
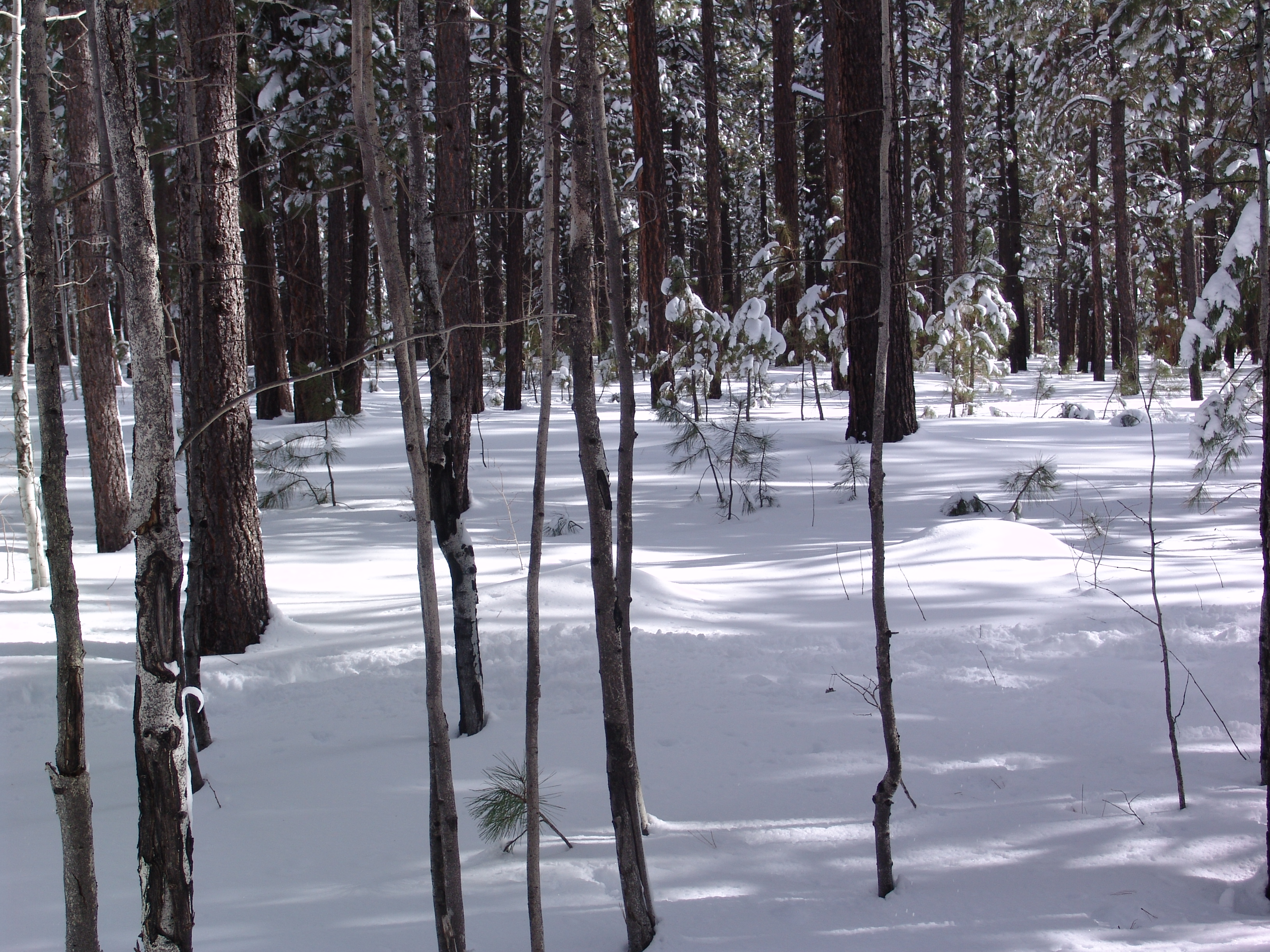
Snowy forest near Forest Lakes, Arizona in winter.

Forest Lakes stretches roughly 3 miles north–south and 2 miles east–west. However, most of that area is national forest. The Forest Lakes Estates subdivision as recorded on the Coconino County Assessor's maps, has an area of approximately 1.89 square miles (4.9 km^{2}), all land.

=== Climate ===
According to the Köppen Climate Classification system, Forest Lakes has a Highland Continental climate, abbreviated "Dsb" on climate maps. According to the NOAA, July averages a high of 80 °F, and a low of 50 °F. January averages a high of 43 °F and a low of 14 °F. Forest Lakes gets 19 inches of rain per year. Most of the rain falls during Monsoon season, which is usually July to September. They receive an average of 31 inches of snow.

Climate data for Forest Lakes, Arizona (1991-2020)
Month	Jan	Feb	Mar	Apr	May	Jun	Jul	Aug	Sep	Oct	Nov	Dec	Year
Mean daily maximum °F (°C)	42.8 (6.0)	45.8 (7.7)	51.7 (10.9)	58.4 (14.7)	67.5 (19.7)	78.9 (26.1)	81.0 (27.2)	78.6 (25.9)	73.6 (23.1)	63.5 (17.5)	51.8 (11.0)	42.7 (5.9)	61.4 (16.3)
Daily mean °F (°C)	32.5 (0.3)	35.3 (1.8)	40.4 (4.7)	46.0 (7.8)	54.3 (12.4)	64.6 (18.1)	68.5 (20.3)	66.5 (19.2)	61.5 (16.4)	51.4 (10.8)	40.9 (4.9)	32.8 (0.4)	49.6 (9.8)
Mean daily minimum °F (°C)	22.9 (−5.1)	24.9 (−3.9)	29.1 (−1.6)	33.6 (0.9)	41.1 (5.1)	50.3 (10.2)	55.9 (13.3)	54.5 (12.5)	49.5 (9.7)	39.3 (4.1)	30.0 (−1.1)	22.9 (−5.1)	37.8 (3.2)
Average precipitation inches (mm)	3.36 (85)	3.08 (78)	2.79 (71)	1.10 (28)	0.78 (20)	0.36 (9.1)	2.86 (73)	3.56 (90)	2.01 (51)	1.62 (41)	2.13 (54)	3.38 (86)	27.03 (686.1)
Average precipitation days	5.2	5.4	6.3	4.1	4.2	3.3	10.6	13.2	6.8	4.7	4.7	4.4	72.9
Average dew point °F (°C)	17.9 (−7.8)	18.4 (−7.6)	20.1 (−6.6)	19.4 (−7.0)	23.9 (−4.5)	28.1 (−2.2)	44.4 (6.9)	48.4 (9.1)	40.6 (4.8)	28.4 (−2.0)	20.8 (−6.2)	16.6 (−8.6)	27.3 (−2.6)
Mean daily daylight hours	10.6	11.4	12.4	13.5	14.5	14.9	14.7	13.8	12.8	11.7	10.8	10.3	12.6
Source 1: PRISM Climate Group
Source 2: Weatherbase(precipitation days-daylight)

== Demographics ==
Historical population
Census	Pop.	Note	%±
2000	266		—
2010	207		−22.2%
2020	155		−25.1%

Forest lakes is located within ZIP Code 85931. The ZIP Code is primarily unsettled, rural forest lands with the exception of Forest Lakes.

As of the census of 2000, there were 266 people, 136 households, and 97 families residing in the ZCTA for ZIP Code 85931. There were 916 housing units. The racial makeup of the ZCTA was 99.2% White, 0.4% Native American, and 0.4% Asian. Hispanic or Latino of any race were 6.6% of the population.

There were 136 households, out of which 7.4% had children under the age of 18 living with them, 69% were married couples living together, 2% had a female householder with no husband present, and 29% were non-families. 25% of all households were made up of individuals, and 10% had someone living alone who was 65 years of age or older. The average household size was 1.96 and the average family size was 2.29.

In the ZCTA the population was spread out, with 7% under the age of 18, 1% from 18 to 24, 13% from 25 to 44, 42% from 45 to 64, and 36% who were 65 years of age or older. The median age was 60.5 years. For every 100 females, there were 110.4 males. For every 100 females age 18 and over, there were 107.6 males.

The median income for a household in the ZCTA was $34,773, and the median income for a family was $34,219. The per capita income for the ZCTA was $21,981. About 9% of families and 12% of the population were below the poverty line, including 20% of those under age 18 and 5% of those age 65 or over.

== Economy ==
Retirement and tourism are an important part of the Forest Lakes economy. Proximity to the Sitgreaves National Forest provides recreational opportunities. Service businesses provide employment and services for the predominant retirement community.

== Parks and outdoor recreation ==
Immediately south of Forest Lakes is the Mogollon Rim, a steep escarpment ranging from 1,000 to 2,000 feet from the base to the highest plateau. The Rim divides the northern plateau region from the lower central and southern areas. The Rim offers scenic views and numerous man-made lakes ideal for fishing.

Hunting for elk, deer, turkey, antelope and bear is permitted. Fishing, in nearby trout streams, is popular. There are also picnic and camping facilities available within the area. Other scenic attractions in the area include Black Canyon Lake, Willow Springs Lake, Woods Canyon Lake, Chevelon Canyon Lake, the Canyon Creek Fish Hatchery, Chevelon Butte, and the Fort Apache Indian Reservation.

== Education ==
It is in the Chevelon Butte School District. That district, which does not operate any schools, sends Forest Lakes area students to Heber-Overgaard Unified School District schools. Mountain Meadows Primary School, Capps Middle School, Mogollon Junior High School, and Mogollon High School serve the Forest Lakes community in the neighboring town of Heber-Overgaard.

Student enrollment is approximately 551.

== Transportation ==
Mountain Valley Shuttle stops in Forest Lakes on its Phoenix-Show Low route.

== Nearest cities and towns ==
- Christopher Creek
- Heber-Overgaard
- Payson
- Young
