= Gila Institute for Technology =

School district in Arizona, United States

Coordinates: 32.8435°N 109.7613°W

The Gila Institute for Technology (GIFT) is a joint technological education district serving eastern Arizona.

== Member high schools ==
- Duncan High School
- Fort Thomas High School
- Mount Graham High School
- Morenci High School
- Pima High School
- Safford High School
- Thatcher High School
