= Three Points, Arizona =

- CDP
- Location in Pima County and the state of Arizona

- Location in the United States
- Coordinates: 32°2′55″N 111°17′7″W
- Country: United States
- State: Arizona
- County: Pima

Area
  - Total: 46.61 sq mi (120.73 km^{2})
  - Land: 46.61 sq mi (120.73 km^{2})
  - Water: 0 sq mi (0.00 km^{2})
- Elevation: 2,543 ft (775 m)

Population (2020)
  - Total: 5,184
  - Density: 111.2/sq mi (42.94/km^{2})
- Time zone: UTC-7 (MST (no DST))
- FIPS code: 04-73700
- GNIS feature ID: 0024652

Three Points is a census-designated place (CDP) in Pima County, Arizona, United States. The population was 5,184 at the 2020 census, down from 5,581 at the 2010 census.

== History ==
Three Points, also known as Robles Junction, was founded in 1882. Bernabe S. Robles, who was born in 1857, in Baviácora, Sonora, Mexico. His family relocated to Tucson in 1864, where he grew up. After spending sometime in Florence, Arizona, he returned to Tucson and accepted a mail route to Gunsight, Arizona, near Ajo. It was during this time he located what is now called Robles Pass, near Cat (Back) Mountain, while searching for a shorter route to Gunsight. In 1882, he had his brother Jesús homesteaded 160 acres at what is now Robles Junction/Three Points. The brothers dug a well to set up a watering stop and stage station so Bernabe could water his horses along his mail route. He eventually gave up his mail route, and moved to the former watering stop/stage station, which at that point was called the Robles Ranch. He and his family ran the ranch for many years, even after the family had moved back to Tucson. Robles died in 1945. The old ranch house is now the Three Points/Robles Junction Community Center.

== Geography ==
Three Points is located at 32°2′55″N 111°17′7″W (32.048652, -111.285174).

According to the United States Census Bureau, the CDP has a total area of 44.5 square miles (115 km^{2}), all land.

== Demographics ==
Historical population
Census	Pop.	Note	%±
2000	5,273		—
2010	5,581		5.8%
2020	5,184		−7.1%
U.S. Decennial Census

=== 2020 census ===
As of the 2020 census, Three Points had a population of 5,184. The median age was 49.5 years. 19.7% of residents were under the age of 18 and 24.8% of residents were 65 years of age or older. For every 100 females there were 109.7 males, and for every 100 females age 18 and over there were 108.8 males age 18 and over.

0.0% of residents lived in urban areas, while 100.0% lived in rural areas.

There were 2,049 households in Three Points, of which 22.8% had children under the age of 18 living in them. Of all households, 43.2% were married-couple households, 25.3% were households with a male householder and no spouse or partner present, and 23.9% were households with a female householder and no spouse or partner present. About 28.5% of all households were made up of individuals and 15.8% had someone living alone who was 65 years of age or older.

There were 2,392 housing units, of which 14.3% were vacant. The homeowner vacancy rate was 1.4% and the rental vacancy rate was 7.2%.

Racial composition as of the 2020 census
Race	Number	Percent
White	3,324	64.1%
Black or African American	43	0.8%
American Indian and Alaska Native	170	3.3%
Asian	31	0.6%
Native Hawaiian and Other Pacific Islander	2	0.0%
Some other race	685	13.2%
Two or more races	929	17.9%
Hispanic or Latino (of any race)	1,847	35.6%

=== 2000 census ===
As of the census of 2000, there were 5,273 people, 1,772 households, and 1,304 families living in the CDP. The population density was 118.4 inhabitants per square mile (45.7/km^{2}). There were 2,022 housing units at an average density of 45.4 per square mile (17.5/km^{2}). The racial makeup of the CDP was 70.6% White or European American, 0.7% Black or African American, 2.5% Native American, 0.4% Asian, 0.1% Pacific Islander, 22.2% from other races, and 3.49% from two or more races. 40.8% of the population were Hispanic or Latino of any race.

There were 1,772 households, out of which 38.5% had children under the age of 18 living with them, 56.9% were married couples living together, 10.9% had a female householder with no husband present, and 26.4% were non-families. 19.8% of all households were made up of individuals, and 5.1% had someone living alone who was 65 years of age or older. The average household size was 2.98 and the average family size was 3.46.

In the CDP, the population was spread out, with 31.8% under the age of 18, 8.1% from 18 to 24, 29.0% from 25 to 44, 23.6% from 45 to 64, and 7.5% who were 65 years of age or older. The median age was 33 years. For every 100 females, there were 106.5 males. For every 100 females age 18 and over, there were 102.4 males.

The median income for a household in the CDP was $31,486, and the median income for a family was $35,229. Males had a median income of $28,642 versus $22,857 for females. The per capita income for the CDP was $13,088. About 18.0% of families and 22.1% of the population were below the poverty line, including 30.0% of those under age 18 and 12.8% of those age 65 or over.

== Education ==
The CDP is in the Altar Valley Elementary School District.
