= Federal Correctional Institution, Safford =

Low-security prison in Arizona, US

Coordinates: 32°43′01″N 109°43′28″W

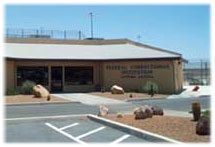
- Interactive map of Federal Correctional Institution, Safford
- Location: Swift Trail Junction, Graham County, near Safford, Arizona
- Status: Operational
- Security class: Low-security
- Population: 1,216
- Managed by: Federal Bureau of Prisons
- Warden: Art Dulgov

The Federal Correctional Institution, Safford (FCI Safford) is a low-security United States federal prison for male inmates in Swift Trail Junction, Arizona. It is operated by the Federal Bureau of Prisons, a division of the United States Department of Justice.

FCI Safford is located in southeastern Arizona, 7 miles (11 km) south of the city of Safford, 127 miles (204 km) northeast of Tucson, and 165 miles (266 km) east of Phoenix.

== Inmate life ==
All inmates are required to work in some capacity. Inmates are normally placed on a job assignment most compatible with his interest or job skill. Inmates with severe financial needs will be considered for priority placement on the waiting list in Federal Prison Industries (UNICOR). The regular work day for the inmate population starts at 7:30 am and lasts until 3:30 pm. Some work details stagger schedules such as UNICOR, food service, laundry, recreation, and the unit orderlies. UNICOR employs large numbers of inmates and specializes in the production of textile products for sale to governmental agencies.

== Programs and services ==
Inmates who have not yet attained their high school diploma are required to attend a General Educational Development (GED) program. A variety of college level courses are offered in a classroom setting through Eastern Arizona College, as well as through correspondence. Vocational training programs are also available.

== Notable inmates (current and former) ==
Inmate name	Register number	Photo	Status	Details
John Ehrlichman	Unlisted^{†}		Released April 27, 1978 after serving 18 months of a 2–8 year sentence (later commuted to 1–4 years).	Domestic Affairs Adviser to President Nixon. Convicted of conspiracy, obstruction of justice, perjury and other charges related to the Watergate scandal.
David Hall	Unlisted^{†}		Released from custody in 1978 after serving 10 months at the minimum-security prison farm.	Governor of Oklahoma from 1971 to 1975; convicted in 1975 of bribery and extortion for conspiring to receive a $50,000 bribe in return for influencing the investment of state retirement funds.
Kevin Tubbs	69039-065		Released from custody in 2016 after serving 12 years.	Member of the ecoterrorist group Earth Liberation Front (ELF); pleaded guilty in 2006 to arson for setting fires at an SUV dealership, a tree farm and a police station in Oregon between 1996 and 2001.
Jacob Chansley	24866-509		Served a 41-month sentence, released on May 25, 2023.	Participated in the 2021 US Capitol attack
Allen Pace	16023-112		Released from a 24-year sentence on October 1, 2020.	Convicted in 2001 of masterminding the 1997 theft of $18.9 million from the Dunbar Armored Car Company in Los Angeles in the largest cash armed robbery in US history.
Lyle Jeffs	24426-081		Served a sentence of less than five years. Released on March 15, 2021.	Polygamous Fundamentalist Church of Jesus Christ of Latter-Day Saints "prophet" pleaded guilty to a count of defrauding the Supplemental Nutrition Assistance Program (SNAP) and one count of failure to appear in court.
Dennis Alexio	93052-011		Serving sentence of 15 years. Transferred to FCI Beaumont. Scheduled for release in 2027.	Dennis "The Terminator" Alexio, World kickboxing champion, professional boxer and actor. Convicted in 2016 of tax fraud, money laundering and 26 other charges.
Karl F. Thompson Jr.	12755-085		Served a 51-month sentence; released July 2016.	Former Spokane Police Officer convicted in 2011 for killing Otto Zehm with a baton
Stephen Walter	27661-112		Serving a 17.5 year sentence; scheduled for release in 2035.	Convicted for his role in distributing fentanyl to hip-hop artist/producer Mac Miller which contributed to his death in 2018.

^{† Inmates who were released from custody prior to 1982 are not listed on the Federal Bureau of Prisons website.}

== See also ==
- List of United States federal prisons
- Federal Bureau of Prisons
- Incarceration in the United States
