= Death of Otto Zehm =

American victim of police brutality (1969–2006)

- Date: March 18, 2006 (incident), March 20, 2006 (death)
- Venue: Zip Trip convenience store
- Location: Spokane, Washington, USA
- Type: Death in custody, Police brutality
- Cause: Lack of oxygen to the brain due to heart failure while being restrained on his stomach
- Target: Otto Zehm
- Perpetrator: Karl F. Thompson Jr. (convicted)
- Filmed by: Convenience store surveillance video
- Participants: Otto Zehm, Karl F. Thompson Jr., other Spokane Police officers
- Outcome: Criminal conviction of Karl F. Thompson Jr., civil settlement, reforms in Spokane Police Department
- Deaths: 1 (Otto Zehm)
- Inquiries: Internal investigation FBI investigation
- Coroner: Spokane County Medical Examiner
- Convicted: Karl F. Thompson Jr.
- Charges: Excessive use of force making a false entry into a record
- Trial: US District Court in Yakima, Washington
- Verdict: Guilty on both counts
- Sentence: 51 months in federal prison
- Litigation: Civil lawsuit filed by the Estate of Otto Zehm
- Otto Zehm had a developmental disability. The incident led to public outrage and calls for police reform.

Otto Zehm (October 31, 1969 – March 20, 2006) was a man with a developmental disability from Spokane, Washington, who died on March 20, 2006, during an altercation with police officer Karl F. Thompson Jr. Zehm committed no crime, and on May 30, 2006, the Spokane County Medical Examiner ruled the death a homicide. In 2012, the first of several officers on the scene at Zehm's death was convicted of excessive use of force and lying to investigators, and was sentenced to 51 months imprisonment.

== Incident and death ==
On March 18, 2006, Zehm, a white man—who worked as a janitor and did not own a car—went on foot to an ATM at his bank to withdraw money from his account. Two young women, who were in a car at the ATM when Zehm arrived, erroneously reported to police by phone that a man was attempting to steal money from the ATM. The women followed Zehm in their car while reporting additional information to the police dispatch by phone.

Zehm next entered the convenience store that he routinely visited to buy a soft drink and fast food. Video from the convenience store security cameras show that within sixteen seconds of the officer Thompson entering the store, the officer had run up to Zehm, whose back was initially turned to him, twice ordered him to "drop the pop", and batoned Zehm to the ground—the first of at least seven baton strikes used on Zehm, including strikes to the head. Within another sixteen seconds Zehm had also been tasered. In addition to the multiple beatings and taserings, Zehm was improperly hog-tied by police and placed on his abdomen for more than sixteen minutes. Furthermore, the police requested a non-rebreather mask from paramedics at the scene and strapped it to Zehm's face. The non-rebreather mask was not attached to oxygen. Zehm stopped breathing three minutes after the mask was placed on his face. When ruled a homicide by the county Medical Examiner on May 30, 2006, the cause of death was reported as "lack of oxygen to the brain due to heart failure while being restrained on his stomach." No illegal drugs or alcohol were found in Zehm's system.

== Discrepancies resulting from video analysis ==
Police alleged that Zehm had "lunged" at the original officer with a plastic soft drink bottle. However, the silent surveillance video of the incident (the full version of which was withheld by the police for three months—they were initially altered by an unknown member of the Spokane Police Department to splice out scenes incriminating to Thomson) contradicted this police claim. Then-acting police chief Jim Nicks subsequently stated that he misspoke in alleging Zehm "lunged" at the officer. The video also did not provide support for the officer's claim that he paused and gave verbal orders to Zehm. Each frame showed the officer advancing at a brisk rate while Zehm, after seeing the officer advancing with his baton raised, only back-pedals slowly away.

== Investigative reports ==
In July 2006, then-Spokane mayor Dennis Hession ordered an independent review of Zehm's death, and in August 2006, the report was commissioned. Known as the Worley Report, after law enforcement consultant Michael Worley, the report was commissioned, to look at the three matters—the Zehm homicide, a Spokane Fire Department sex scandal, and the Spokane City Citizens Review Commission. Worley's findings were made public in a report released on October 26, 2007, but covered only the Fire Department sex scandal and the Citizens Advisory Commission. Worley submitted the incomplete report, for which the City of Spokane paid $8,800, pending the completion of other then-pending investigations of the Zehm death, including investigations by the Spokane County Prosecutor's Office, the Washington Association of Sheriffs and Police Chiefs (WASPC), and the FBI. As of August 18, 2008, the FBI has not closed its investigation of the case and has made no public statements regarding the status of that investigation.

== Controversy involving officers ==
Three of the seven officers involved in the attack on Zehm received one day of administrative leave (paid). Beyond that, no Spokane Police officer or administrator has been disciplined or suspended or fired as a result of the case. However, one officer involved in the case, Spokane Police officer Jason Uberuaga, was subsequently fired for "conduct unbecoming" after being involved in an October 11, 2007, incident involving alcohol and allegations of sexual misconduct. At the time of that incident, Uberuaga was a member of a federal law enforcement task force. Uberuaga was later reinstated with 10 1/2 months back pay, following a union arbitrator's determination that firing was excessive punishment for the acts committed.

=== Officer Dan Torok ===
A second Spokane Police officer involved in the Zehm case is Dan Torok. In the Zehm case, Torok provided a written statement in which he stated, "When my knee struck him, I heard him exhale and I was able to force his arm behind his back." In addition to Torok's knee in his chest, Zehm was subjected to being hog-tied and placed on his chest for 16 minutes, as well as being subjected to a non-rebreather mask placed on his face without oxygen attached, thus limiting his ability to breathe. Zehm stopped breathing and was transported by para-medic to a Spokane area hospital where he was declared brain-dead and died two days later. Otto Zehm's last words were, "All I wanted was a Snickers Bar".

Almost exactly a year after his involvement in Zehm's death, Officer Torok shot and killed a homeless man, Jerome Alford, on March 24, 2007. Following a Spokane area practice in which the Spokane Police and Spokane County Sheriff's Office investigate one another in officer involved deaths, the Spokane County Sheriff's Office was assigned to investigate the shooting of Alford by Torok. Spokane Chief of Police Anne E. Kirkpatrick ordered Torok to provide a written statement, known as a Garrity letter, rather than submit to questioning by the Spokane County Sheriff's Office. Garrity letters are so infrequently used in the area that Spokane County Sheriff's personnel did not initially accept the letter from Torok. Final results of the Sheriff's investigation were never made public. Currently, Torok is a Spokane Police Department detective supervising assignments of child abuse cases, and also acting frequently as a spokesperson for the Spokane Police. He is also a controversial participant in on-line blogging at Spokane's only daily newspaper, the Spokesman-Review. In August 2007, he and a colleague, Sgt. Jim Faddis, were discovered blogging anonymously at a Spokesman-Review affiliated blog, Hard 7, until blog manager Frank Sennett discovered their identities and employment with the Spokane Police. Recently another Spokesman-Review blog, Community Comment, has given Torok and Faddis, a former internal affairs officer, semi-official status at Police Blotter, a periodic blog thread identified by a reproduction of the Spokane Police badge at the Spokesman-Review's online blog site.

== Analysis and impact ==
The Zehm case provoked public outrage, including protests and public challenges to the Spokane Police by critics. On July 9, 2007, in the wake of another police scandal involving the arrest on July 4, 2007, of 17 people in Spokane's Riverfront Park, a group of some 200 people gathered a block from Spokane's Public Safety Building demanding independent oversight of the Spokane Police Department. At the end of the rally, a group of people entered the street and marched to City Hall where they presented their concerns to the Spokane City Council.

The case also prompted intense scrutiny by the local media and calls for independent oversight. A series of public meetings were held in the first half of 2007, including a three part series on Police Accountability at Gonzaga University. Participants in the series included Breean Beggs of Spokane's Center for Justice, independent journalist Tim Connor, Spokane Police Chief Anne Kirkpatrick, Spokane City Councilwoman Mary Verner, and others. The series, sponsored by the ACLU, the League of Women Voters, and the Peace and Justice Action League (PJALS), culminated in a growing consensus that an appropriate step to address the concerns about police misconduct would be an independent ombudsman styled after the Boise (Idaho) Office of the Community Ombudsman headed by Pierce Murphy. Murphy visited Spokane several times including to participate in one of the Police Accountability forums at Gonzaga. Murphy also spoke prior to a Whitworth University theater production on Police Accountability and the death of Zehm. The unique event—Crossing the Line: An Examination of Police, Power and People—was held on May 16, 2008, at Spokane's CenterStage.

== Federal indictment and trial ==
On June 22, 2009, a federal Grand Jury handed down an indictment on Spokane Police Officer Karl Thompson. Thompson is a veteran of the force and was the first of seven officers that responded to the Zip Trip. The 2 counts are: unreasonable use of force and making a false entry into a record being investigated by a federal agency. Both counts are felonies and could hold a 20-year maximum sentence if Thompson is convicted on both charges. Standard sentencing ranges for these offenses would likely result in confinement in a federal institution for 2–4 years. The unreasonable use of force stems from the surveillance video that shows Thompson approaching Zehm from behind and striking him to the ground moments after Zehm turned and faced the officer without any indication of aggressiveness, followed by multiple vertical baton blows and an application of a drive-stun taser. Zehm was not acting combatively at the time of the initial blow and only started fighting back after Thompson engaged Zehm with force. Federal prosecutors confirmed that the unreasonable use of force charge against Thompson was due to the injuries Zehm suffered from the initial baton blows and not Zehm's death. It is unclear at this time if more indictments will be handed down for Zehm's death or for his improper restraint for being hog-tied on his stomach with a non-rebreather mask.

Thompson's federal trial began on October 12, 2011, with jury selection. The trial was moved from Spokane to Yakima, Washington after defense attorneys raised concerns about the extent of local media coverage of the controversy. Judge Fred Van Sickle of US District Court in Yakima ruled to exclude residents of Spokane County from the jury pool in the interest of fairness.

On November 2, 2011, the jury found Thompson guilty on both counts; excessive use of force and lying to investigators about the confrontation. Over 50 police officers were in attendance when the verdict was announced and saluted Thompson in a show of solidarity.

Thompson's defense attorneys argued for a sentence of zero to 16 months, while federal prosecutors recommended a sentence of between 9 and 11 years. On November 15, 2012, Judge Van Sickle sentenced Thompson to 51 months in federal prison. Judge Van Sickle also ordered that Thompson be taken into custody immediately over the objections of Thompson's defense attorney, who wanted him to remain free while the verdict is appealed.

Washington State paid $541,180 in legal fees to the law firm defending Karl Thompson. Thompson was declared indigent in July 2009 following an uncontested divorce initiated by his then-wife, Diana J. Thompson. The terms of the divorce decree transferred the bulk of the family assets to Diana, including their $675,000 home, alimony in the amount $1,500 per month, and 50% of Thompson's pension. In addition, all community debts were assigned to Karl Thompson. Thompson continued to live with his ex-wife following the divorce, and shared joint assets and bank accounts in contravention of the divorce decree, until his sentencing and incarceration. Prosecutors have alleged the divorce was fraudulent, undertaken for the dual purposes of shielding assets from the civil suit filed by the Zehm family and forcing the State of Washington to pay for Thompson's legal defense costs.

Until his release from prison in July 2016, Thompson had been serving his sentence at the Federal Correctional Institution, Safford, a low-security prison in Arizona.

== Settlement of civil case ==
On August 22, 2012, the civil case brought by the Estate of Otto Zehm was closed following mediation and settlement. The settlement included a $1.67 million payment to the family, and budgeting for specialized training for all Spokane Police Officers more than 1 year from retirement. The training will focus on police interaction with mentally ill detainees. The settlement also includes a budget for implementation of new rules regarding the use of force, and a permanent memorial to Otto Zehm. Attorneys for the Estate were Breean Beggs and Jeffry Finer; and for the City of Spokane, Nancy Isserlis.

== See also ==
- List of killings by law enforcement officers in the United States
- Positional asphyxia
