= KRDX =

Radio station in Tucson, Arizona

Coordinates: 31.928°N 110.633°W

- Corona de Tucson, Arizona; United States
- Broadcast area: Tucson metropolitan area
- Frequency: 103.7 MHz
- Branding: 103.7 The Fox

Programming
- Format: Oldies

Ownership
- Owner: Ted Tucker; (Desert West Air Ranchers Corporation)

History
- First air date: 1977
- Former call signs: KAYN (1977–1991); KLCR (1991–1995); KZNO (1995–2005)
- Former frequencies: 98.3 MHz (1976–2006); 98.5 MHz (2006–2020)

Technical information
- Licensing authority: FCC
- Facility ID: 36023
- Class: A
- ERP: 910 watts
- HAAT: 145 meters (476 ft)
- Translator: 96.7 K244EI (Corona de Tucson)

Links
- Public license information: Public file; LMS

KRDX (103.7 FM) is a commercial radio station licensed to Corona de Tucson, Arizona, United States, and serving the Tucson metropolitan area. It is owned by Ted Tucker, with the license held by Desert West Air Ranchers Corporation. The station airs an oldies format, known as "103.7 The Fox."

KRDX's transmitter is sited southwest of Tucson, in the Santa Rita Foothills, near Vail. It also broadcasts on 250-watt FM translator K244EI at 96.7 MHz.

== History ==
The station signed on the air in 1977 as KAYN, broadcasting on 98.3 MHz as the first FM radio station in Nogales, Arizona. It was owned by Norman and Eva Graham and broadcast with 215 watts. The construction permit was granted over the objections of KFBR, the only other American radio station serving the border area. The station was sold to Roadrunner Broadcasting in 1988. KZLZ Broadcasting bought the station, by then known as KLCR, in 1994.

In 1999, after two additional sales, Ted Tucker bought the station, then known as KZNO. In April 2002, Tucker was approved to move KZNO from 98.3 in Nogales to 98.5 in Vail, Arizona, increasing its ERP to 3,900 watts.

According to a U.S. Federal Communications Commission (FCC) filing in 2006, the station was unable to maintain a reliable power supply. The only access to the transmitter site was via helicopter, and the station was powered solely by solar panels and wind turbines. The filing with the FCC asked to operate at less than licensed power or erratically based on power availability. The application was accepted by the FCC, but not approved.

In June 2010, KRDX was granted an FCC construction permit to change the city of license to Corona de Tucson, Arizona, and move to 103.7 MHz, which would end its long-time interference with KOHT. The station was licensed for the new frequency and community of license effective October 9, 2020. The 103.7 transmitter now has a more consistent signal throughout all of Tucson.

== See also ==
- List of radio stations in Arizona
