= Navit (disambiguation) =

Navit is a free and open-source car navigation system.

Navit may also refer to:

- Navit Barel (born 1977), Israeli poet, editor, literary critic, and translator
- Northern Arizona Vocational Institute of Technology, a joint technological education district in northern and eastern Arizona
