= Swift Trail Junction, Arizona =

CDP in Graham County, Arizona

- Census-designated place
- Location in Graham County and the state of Arizona

- Location in the United States
- Coordinates: 32°43′50″N 109°42′53″W
- Country: United States
- State: Arizona
- County: Graham

Area
  - Total: 3.72 sq mi (9.63 km^{2})
  - Land: 3.68 sq mi (9.54 km^{2})
  - Water: 0.035 sq mi (0.09 km^{2})
- Elevation: 3,229 ft (984 m)

Population (2020)
  - Total: 2,810
  - Density: 763/sq mi (294.5/km^{2})
- Time zone: UTC-7 (MST (no DST))
- ZIP code: 85546
- Area code: 928
- FIPS code: 04-71650
- GNIS feature ID: 2410041

Swift Trail Junction is a census-designated place (CDP) in Graham County, Arizona, United States. The population was 2,935 at the 2010 census, up from 2,195 in 2000. It is part of the Safford Micropolitan Statistical Area. It is situated at the junction of U.S. Route 191 and State Route 366 (also known as the Swift Trail Parkway). The Swift Trail Parkway is a scenic highway that winds through the Coronado National Forest and provides access to the higher elevations of the Pinaleño Mountains.

== Geography ==
Swift Trail Junction is located in south-central Graham County at the base of the Pinaleno Mountains. It is bordered to the north by the Cactus Flats CDP. The junction at the center of the CDP is between U.S. Route 191, which leads north 7 miles (11 km) to Safford, the county seat, and south 26 miles (42 km) to Interstate 10, and Arizona State Route 366, which leads southwest 28 miles (45 km) up into the heart of the Pinaleno Mountains.

According to the United States Census Bureau, the Swift Trail Junction CDP has a total area of 3.7 square miles (9.6 km^{2}), of which 3.7 square miles (9.5 km^{2}) is land and 0.04 square miles (0.1 km^{2}), or 0.9%, is water. Federal Correctional Institution, Safford, a low-security federal prison for male inmates, is located in the southwest corner of the CDP.

== Demographics ==
Historical population
| Census | Pop. | Note | %± |
|---|---|---|---|
| 2020 | 2,810 | | — |
U.S. Decennial Census

=== 2020 census ===
As of the 2020 census, Swift Trail Junction had a population of 2,810. The median age was 37.5 years. 20.1% of residents were under the age of 18 and 11.1% of residents were 65 years of age or older. For every 100 females there were 186.7 males, and for every 100 females age 18 and over there were 222.6 males age 18 and over.

0.0% of residents lived in urban areas, while 100.0% lived in rural areas.

There were 662 households in Swift Trail Junction, of which 37.3% had children under the age of 18 living in them. Of all households, 53.6% were married-couple households, 18.6% were households with a male householder and no spouse or partner present, and 18.4% were households with a female householder and no spouse or partner present. About 20.3% of all households were made up of individuals and 9.9% had someone living alone who was 65 years of age or older.

There were 741 housing units, of which 10.7% were vacant. The homeowner vacancy rate was 1.8% and the rental vacancy rate was 10.3%.

Racial composition as of the 2020 census
| Race | Number | Percent |
|---|---|---|
| White | 2,106 | 74.9% |
| Black or African American | 129 | 4.6% |
| American Indian and Alaska Native | 130 | 4.6% |
| Asian | 39 | 1.4% |
| Native Hawaiian and Other Pacific Islander | 0 | 0.0% |
| Some other race | 145 | 5.2% |
| Two or more races | 261 | 9.3% |
| Hispanic or Latino (of any race) | 949 | 33.8% |

=== 2000 census ===
As of the census of 2000, there were 2,195 people, 499 households, and 349 families residing in the CDP. The population density was 465.2 inhabitants per square mile (179.6/km^{2}). There were 561 housing units at an average density of 118.9 per square mile (45.9/km^{2}). The racial makeup of the CDP was 77.7% White, 5.8% Black or African American, 6.1% Native American, 2.2% Asian, 0.1% Pacific Islander, 7.2% from other races, and 1.0% from two or more races. 28.4% of the population were Hispanic or Latino of any race.

There were 499 households, out of which 33.9% had children under the age of 18 living with them, 56.9% were married couples living together, 8.8% had a female householder with no husband present, and 29.9% were non-families. 24.6% of all households were made up of individuals, and 9.4% had someone living alone who was 65 years of age or older. The average household size was 2.56 and the average family size was 3.07.

In the CDP, the population was spread out, with 16.1% under the age of 18, 10.2% from 18 to 24, 43.6% from 25 to 44, 20.7% from 45 to 64, and 9.3% who were 65 years of age or older. The median age was 35 years. For every 100 females, there were 236.1 males. For every 100 females age 18 and over, there were 285.4 males.

The median income for a household in the CDP was $28,393, and the median income for a family was $29,762. Males had a median income of $14,901 versus $18,750 for females. The per capita income for the CDP was $11,731. About 10.4% of families and 13.8% of the population were below the poverty line, including 7.4% of those under age 18 and 22.5% of those age 65 or over.

== Government and infrastructure ==
Federal Correctional Institution, Safford of the Federal Bureau of Prisons (BOP) is located in the CDP.

== Education ==
Almost all of the CDP is in Safford Unified School District while a small western portion is in Pima Unified School District.
