= Heber–Overgaard Unified School District =

School district in Arizona, United States

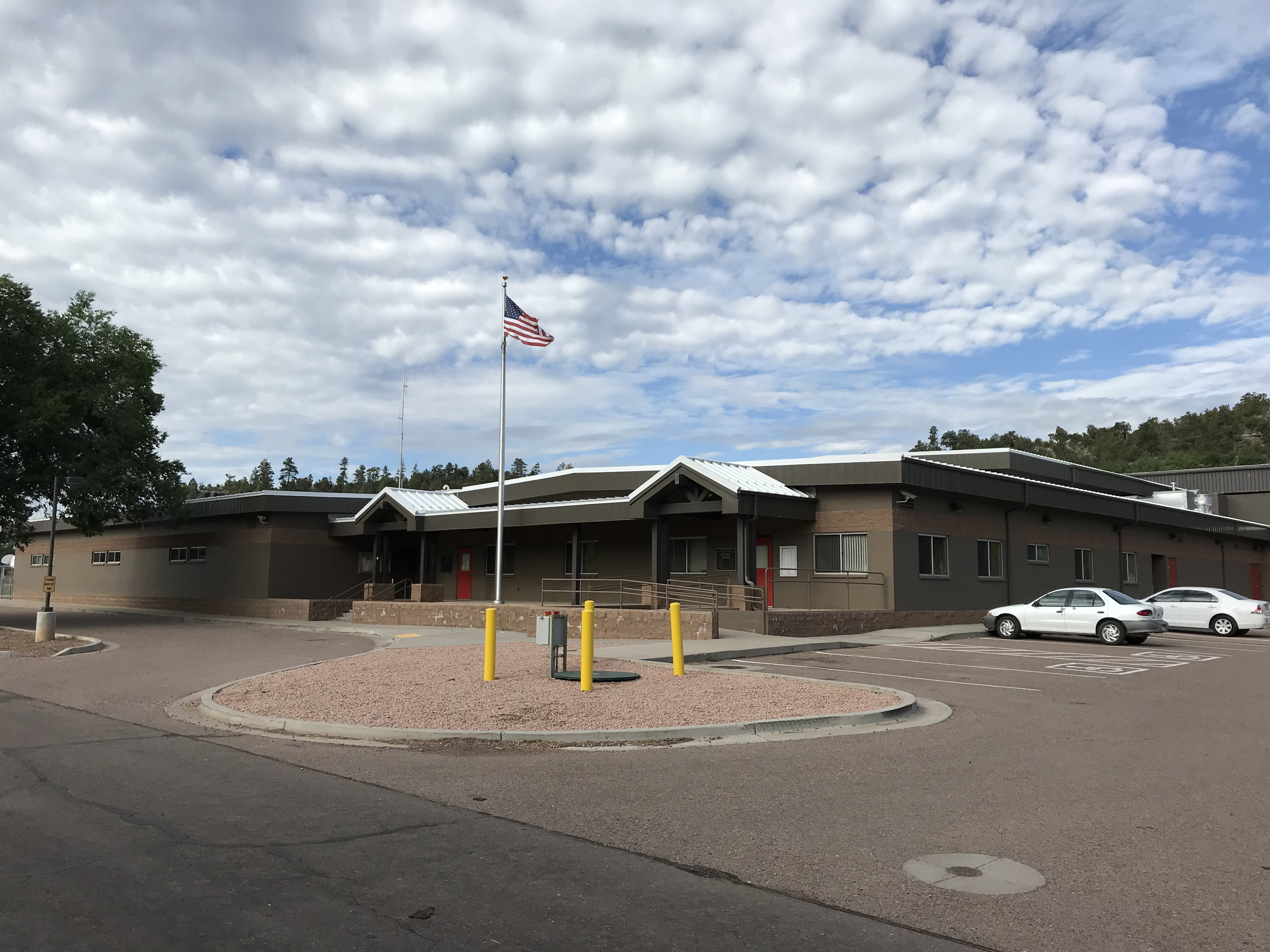
- Heber–Overgaard Unified School District Office

Location
- Heber–Overgaard, surrounding areas Arizona United States

District information
- Type: Public
- Grades: Pre K–12
- Established: 1921
- Superintendent: Ron Tenney
- Schools: 4
- Budget: $5,364,000

Students and staff
- Students: 471
- Teachers: 30.80
- Staff: 36.10

Other information
- Website: heberovergaardschools.org

The Heber–Overgaard Unified School District (HOUSD) is a school district with its headquarters in Heber–Overgaard, Arizona. The 6.86-square-mile (17.8 km^{2}) district serves Heber, Overgaard, and the Forest Lakes area. The district consists of 4 schools; all are title 1 elementary and secondary schools.

The Chevelon Butte School District, which does not operate any schools, sends students in the Forest Lakes area to HOUSD schools.

== History ==
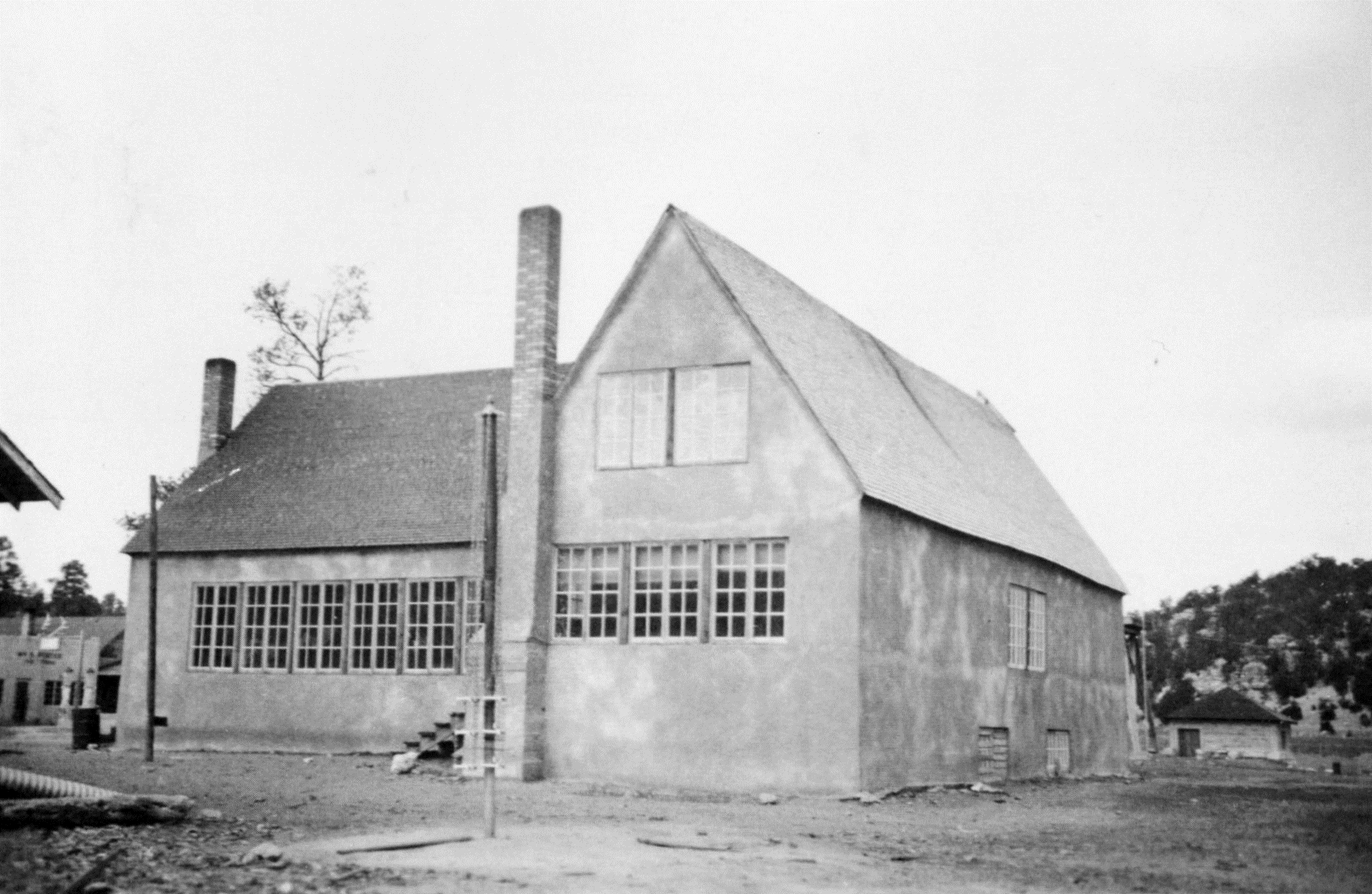
Heber's LDS church and schoolhouse 1925

The Heber school district was established in 1921. Prior to this, children had to move to Joseph City in late fall, after crops were harvested, then return in early spring. Some young residents were taught reading, writing, and arithmetic in the home of James E. Shelly. Mr Shelly was a former teacher in Utah and was the first post master in Heber. His home doubled as school house, post office and community business office.

Around 1921, the first official school year took place in, local residents, Walter and Ammon Shelley's house. Priscilla Shumway, from Snowflake, was the first teacher. Part of her pay was room and board furnished by the parents of local students.

By 1923, the school had moved to the family home of local student, Lovine Crandell. Around 1925, the two room local Latter-day Saints Church building doubled as a school. Children were said to ride to school on horseback from outlying areas. A new LDS church building doubled as a school in the 1930s and early 1940s. The building was also a high school in 1940–42. Due to the outbreak of WWII, it was said to be more difficult to find local teachers. School for low grades continued without interruption.

With the opening of the sawmill in Overgaard in August 1936, many families relocated to the area for work. School was held in the union hall until the new schoolhouse was completed in the late 1940s. The schoolhouse was built by volunteers consisting of union members and Southwest Forest Industries employees. An addition was made to the original building due to a growing population. The building was used until 1972.

In 1961, a road linking Snowflake and the local paper mill was paved. By 1963, the paved road continued on to Heber, making travel to Snowflake easier. Two buses were said to ferry local high school students to and from Snowflake at this time.

Upon moving to Heber in the 1950s, Mr. Brown Capps served as principal, and Mrs. Ella Capps as a teacher, of the Heber schoolhouse until his death in 1969. In 1969/70, the Heber and Overgaard schools consolidated. At this time, a new schoolhouse was planned in Heber. Local townsman, James L. Porter, donated 80% of the land towards the new schoolhouse. In 1971/72, the community build Capps Elementary School (grades K–6). The new school got its namesake from Brown and Ella Capps, and consisted of six classrooms, restrooms, a kitchen, cafeteria and office space. Additional classrooms and other facilities were added later as the community grew. In 1978, the Capps gymnasium was built.

As the population of Heber and Overgaard grew, a local high school was planned. The school was established in 1989, with high school classes and sporting events held at Capps Elementary School until school buildings could be completed. Construction for Mogollon High School, by Spencer-Trulson, began on June 12, 1989. The site was formerly used for rodeo grounds and later a sawmill. The school was named after the nearby Mogollon Rim. The buildings were accepted by the governing board January 5, 1990. Funds were not immediately available to complete landscaping, purchase a stage, put in all of the gym bleachers or finish the office. A public dedication ceremony was held for the new school on January 18, 1990.

Mountain Meadows Primary School (grades Pre K–3) was built in late 1999. Upon completion of Mountain Meadows Primary School, Capps Elementary School (grades K–6) was converted to present day Capps Middle School (grades 4–6).

As of 2019, the Heber–Overgaard Unified School District office is located on the same site as Capps Middle School.

== Demographics ==
As of 2018, there were 45 total teachers, principals, and other school leaders and 485 students currently enrolled in the district with enrollment listed at 100%. Of the 45 teachers, principals, and other school leaders, 34 (80%) are listed as having greater than three years experience in the field and 18 of 45 are title 1 certified.

The racial makeup of the students, in 2018, was 77.11% White, 15.26% Hispanic, 2.89% Multiple Races, 2.68% Native American and 2.06% redacted. The four-year graduation rate within the first four years of enrolling in high school was 88.89%. Graduation rates were broken down to: 89.74% Male, 88.24% Female, 100% Hispanic, 66.7% Low SES, 100% Native American, 100% Special Education, and 84.62% White. In 2018, reports indicate 29 students were enrolled in at least one advanced placement course, 74 students with chronic absenteeism, 36 indents of violence and two students reported as harassed or bullied based on sex, race, color, national origin or disability.

== Academics ==
In the fiscal year 2018, the Arizona Department of Education published an annual achievement profile for every public school in the state based on an A through F scale. Capps Middle School and Mountain Meadows Primary School jointly received an "A" while Mogollon Junior High School received a "D", and Mogollon High School received a "B". Scores were based on "year to year student academic growth, proficiency on English language arts, math and science, the proficiency and academic growth of English language learners, indicators that an elementary student is ready for success in high school and that high school students are ready to succeed in a career or higher education and high school graduation rates".

The United States national nonprofit organization, GreatSchools, gives the following school ratings: Mountain Meadows Primary School 3/10 (below average), Capps Middle School 5/10 (average), and Mogollon High School 7/10 (above average). Mogollon Junior High was not rated by the organization. The organization gives Mogollon High School a 9/10 for "college readiness", 6/10 for standardized "test scores", 3/10 for "equity" (disadvantaged students at this school may be falling behind), and 3/10 for "low-income students" (test scores for low income students fall below the state average).

== Schools ==
- Mogollon High School (grades 9–12). Built in 1990. Current Enrollment 122.
- Mogollon Junior High (grades 7–8). Built in 1990. Current Enrollment 68.
- Capps Middle School (grades 4–6). Built in 1971/72. Current Enrollment 106.
- Mountain Meadows Primary School (grades Pre K–3). Built in 1999. Current Enrollment 105.
Heber–Overgaard Schools
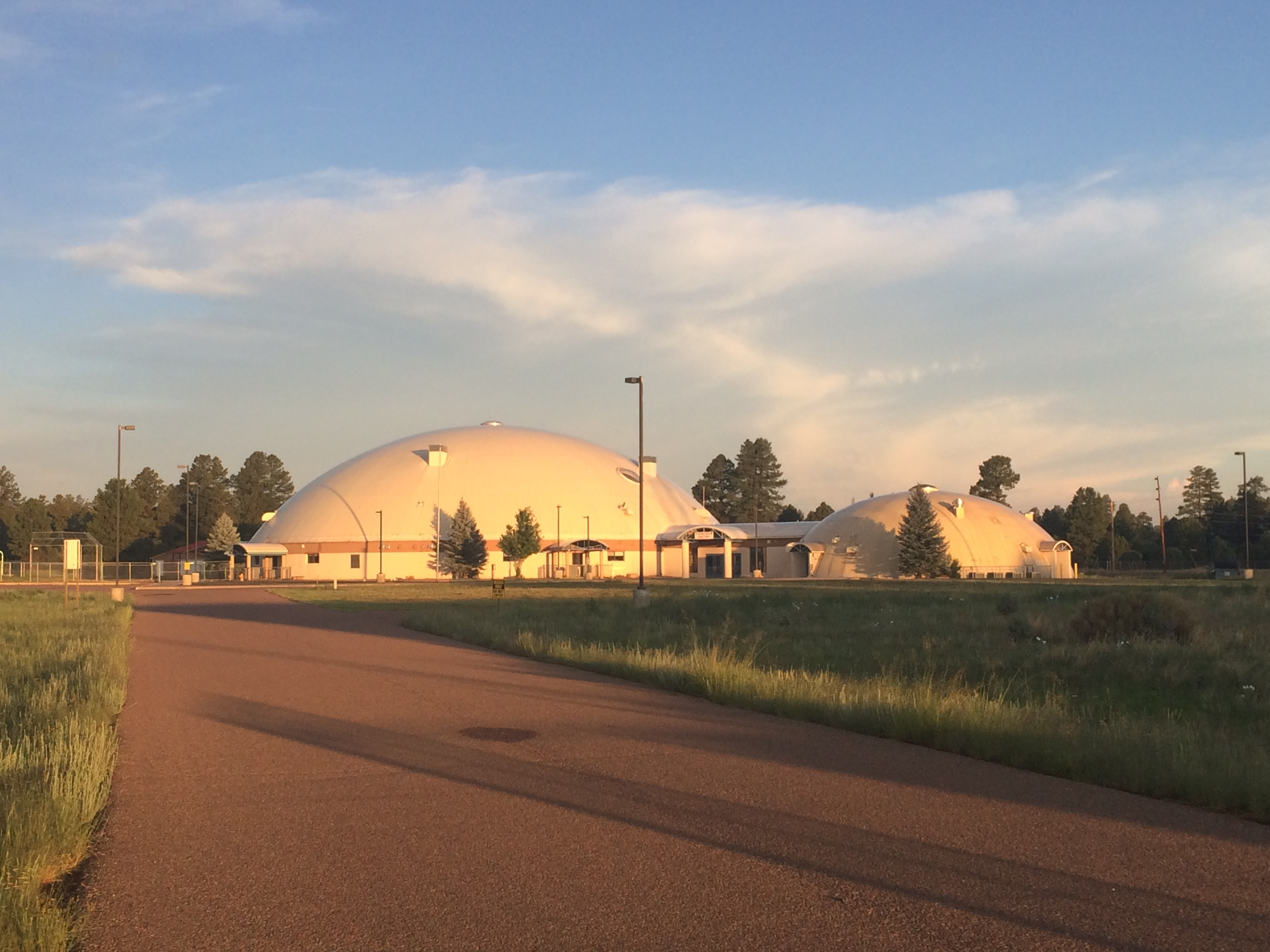
Mountain Meadows Primary School

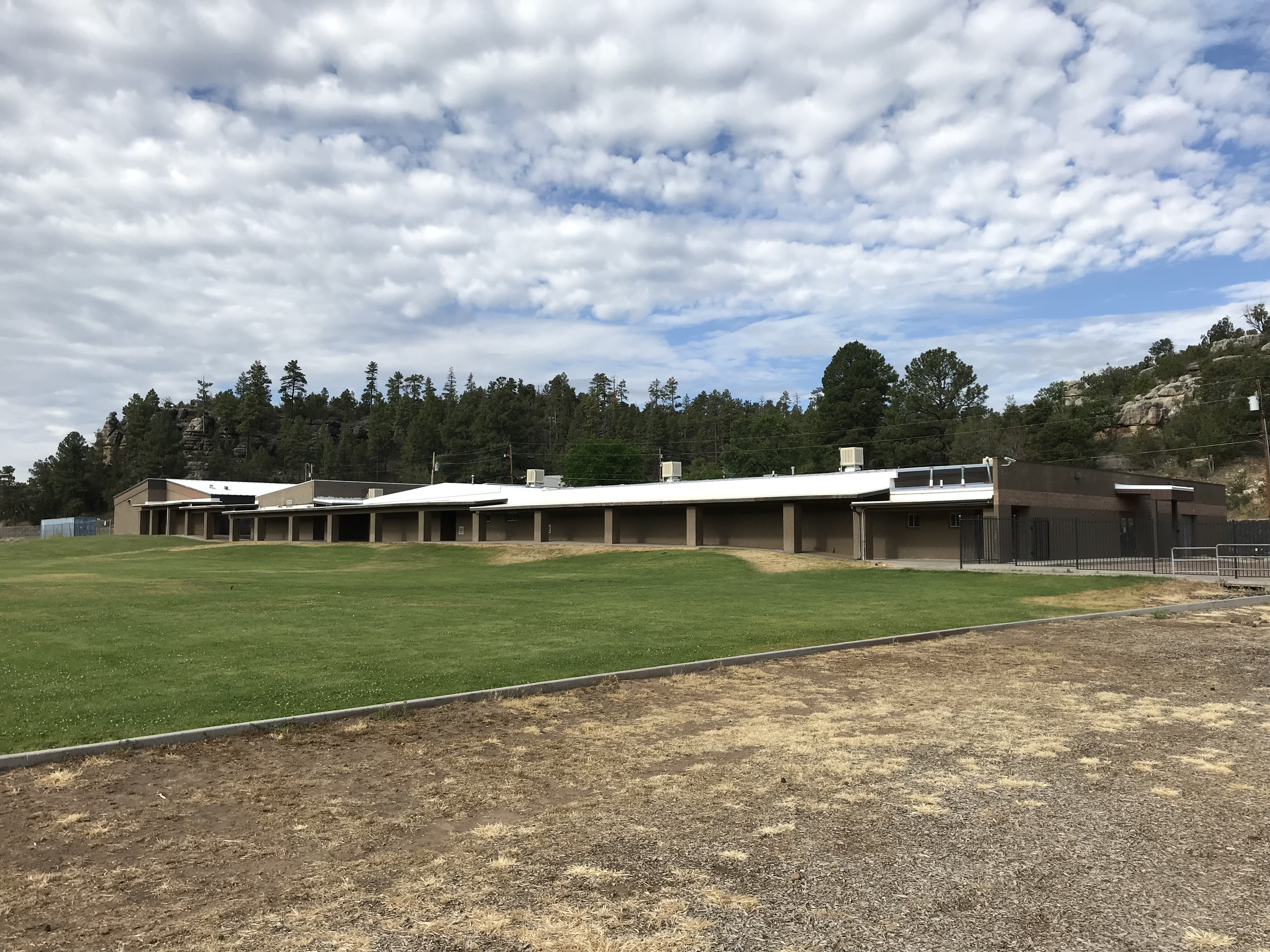
Capps Middle School

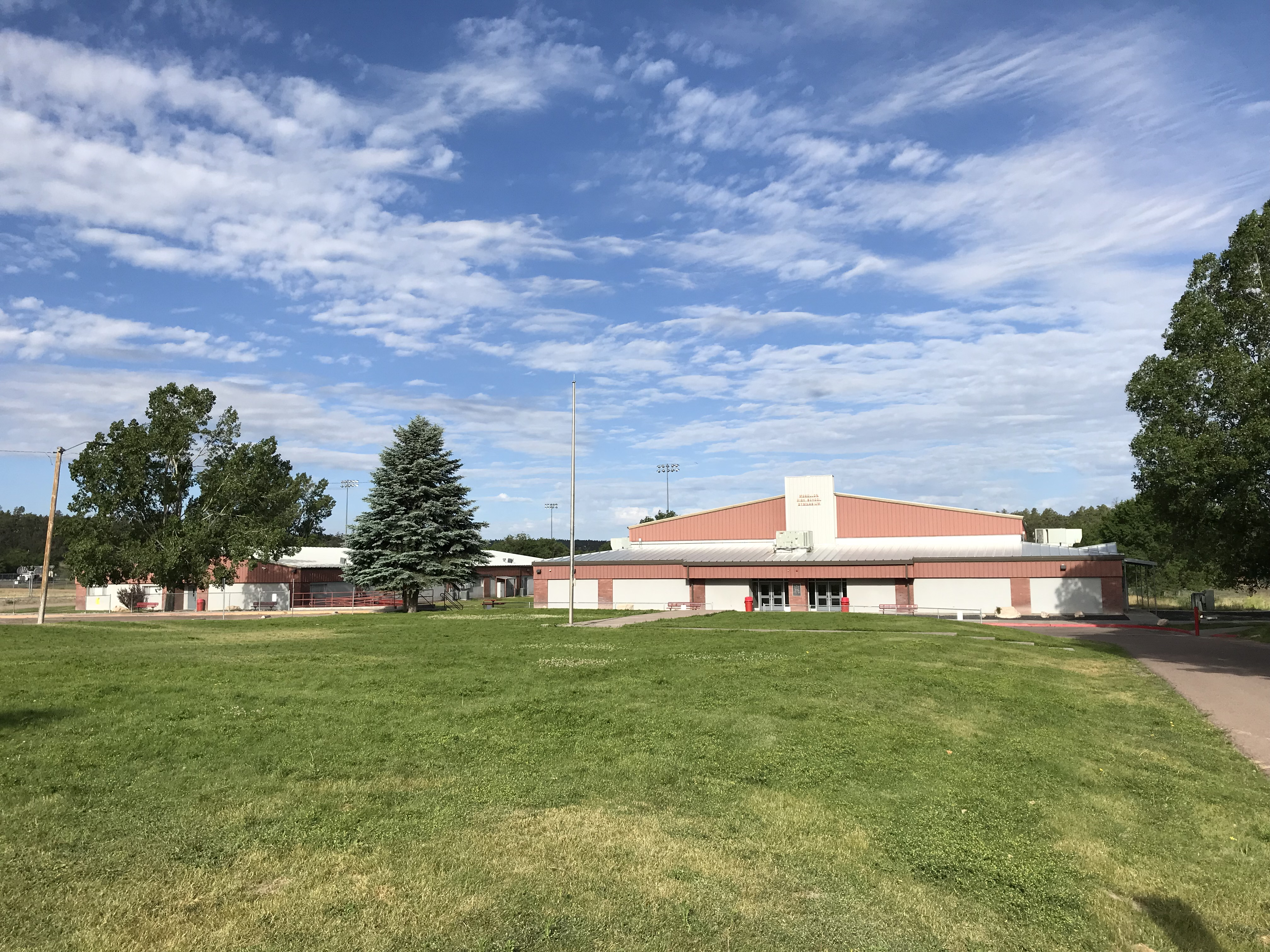
Mogollon High School/Junior High School
