= Mountain Institute Joint Technological Education District =

School district in Arizona, United States

Address
- 220 Ruger Road Prescott, Arizona, 86301; United States
- Coordinates: 34°33′41″N 112°32′24″W

District information
- Type: Public
- Grades: 9–12
- NCES District ID: 0400772

Students and staff
- Students: 25
- Teachers: 2.0
- Staff: 5.0
- Student–teacher ratio: 12.5

Other information
- Website: www.micted.net

Mountain Institute Joint Technological Education District is a school district in Yavapai County, Arizona, founded in 2008 with classes starting in the fall of 2009. It offers vocational and technical education programs to seven member school districts.

== School district members ==
- Ash Fork Joint Unified School District
- Bagdad Unified School District
- Chino Valley Unified School District
- Humboldt Unified School District
- Mayer Unified School District
- Prescott Unified School District
- Seligman Unified School District
