= Valley Academy for Career and Technology Education =

School district in Arizona, United States

Coordinates: 34.74°N 111.85°W

Other information
- Website: vacte.com

Valley Academy for Career and Technology Education (VACTE) is a joint technological education district serving high schools in central Arizona. It is the smallest of Arizona's 13 JTEDs, serving just three high schools in three districts.

== Member school districts ==
- Camp Verde Unified School District
- Mingus Union High School District
- Sedona-Oak Creek Unified School District
