= KNOG =

Radio station in Nogales, Arizona, United States

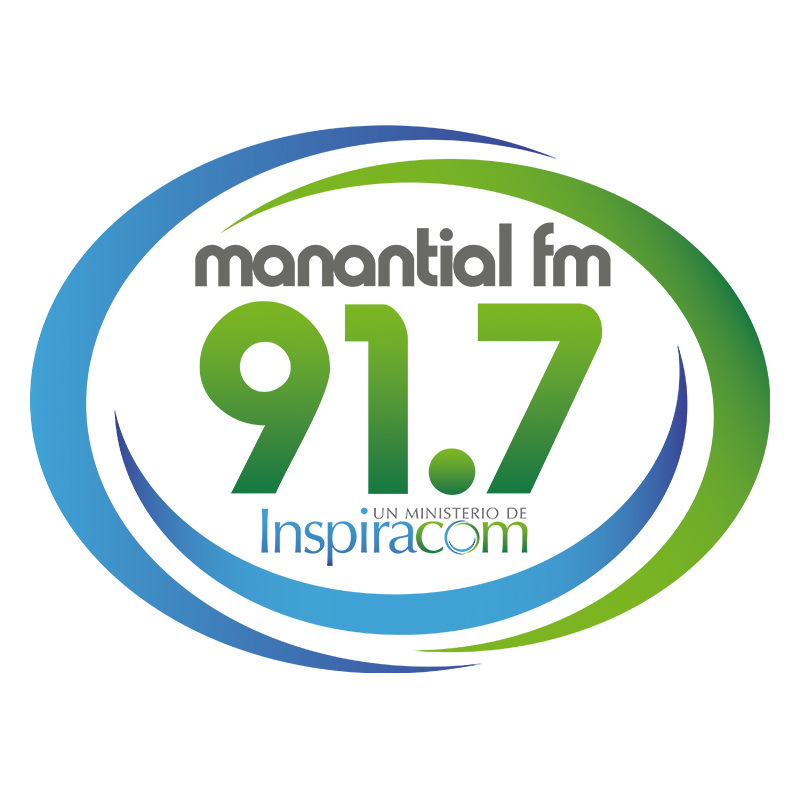
- Nogales, Arizona; United States
- Broadcast area: Nogales, Arizona; Nogales, Sonora
- Frequency: 91.7 MHz

Programming
- Language: Spanish
- Format: Christian radio

Ownership
- Owner: World Radio Network, Inc.

History
- First air date: December 16, 1995
- Former frequencies: 91.1 MHz (1995-2012)
- Call sign meaning: "Nogales"

Technical information
- Licensing authority: FCC
- Facility ID: 73755
- Class: C2
- ERP: 50,000 watts
- HAAT: 52 meters (171 ft)
- Transmitter coordinates: 31°21′33″N 110°53′54″W

Links
- Public license information: Public file; LMS
- Website: knog.org

KNOG (91.7 FM) is a radio station broadcasting a Spanish-language Christian format. It is licensed to Nogales, Arizona, United States. The station is currently owned by World Radio Network, Inc.

The call letters KNOG previously were issued to an AM station in Nogales on 1340 kHz that operated between 1948 and 1965.

From 1974 until March 20, 1985, the call letters, KNOG were issued to a college radio station. This was Northern Montana College (now MSU-Northern) located in Havre Montana. The call letters were changed to KNMC

== FM translators ==
The following FM translators are authorized to rebroadcast KNOG.

Broadcast translator for KNOG
Call sign	Frequency	City of license	FID	FCC info
K216FO	91.1 FM	Guadalupe, Arizona	92402	LMS
K261CK	100.1 FM	San Xavier, Arizona	84806	LMS
K274AQ	102.7 FM	Tucson, Arizona	86835	LMS
K300CV	107.9 FM	Tucson, Arizona	138164	LMS
