= Joint technological education district =

Special school district in Arizona offering career and technical education programs

In Arizona, a joint technological education district (JTED) is a school district that offers high school career and technical education programs to partner school districts. The concept was created in 1990. There are 14 such districts in Arizona, the most recent being the one for Yuma County, which began operations in January 2015.

== List of joint technological education districts ==
- Central Arizona Valley Institute of Technology (CAVIT)
- Cobre Valley Institute of Technology (CVIT)
- Cochise Technology District (CTD)
- Coconino Association for Vocations, Industry and Technology (CAVIAT): a joint technological education district in Coconino County, Arizona. Established in 2001, it receives funding from the state and secondary property taxes in the association's five member districts: the Flagstaff Unified School District, Fredonia-Moccasin Unified School District, Grand Canyon Unified School District, Page Unified School District, and the Williams Unified School District.
- East Valley Institute of Technology (EVIT)
- Gila Institute for Technology (GIFT)
- Mountain Institute Joint Technological Education District (MIJTED)
- Northeast Arizona Technological Institute of Vocational Education (NATIVE)
- Northern Arizona Vocational Institute of Technology (NAVIT)
- Pima County Joint Technical Education District
- Southwest Technical Education District of Yuma (STEDY)
- Valley Academy for Career and Technology Education (VACTE)
- Western Arizona Vocational Education (WAVE)
- Western Maricopa Education Center (West-MEC)
