= Northeast Arizona Technological Institute of Vocational Education =

School district in Arizona, United States

The Northeast Arizona Technological Institute of Vocational Education (NATIVE) is a joint technological education district in the Arizona portion of the Navajo Nation reservation. Its programs are available to students at the member schools. The superintendent is Matthew Weber.

== Member schools ==
- Chinle High School
- Ganado High School
- Monument Valley High School
- Pinon High School
- Red Mesa High School
- Valley High School (Apache County, Arizona)
- Tuba City High School
- Window Rock High School
