= Jacob Chansley =

American QAnon and January 6 Capitol attack figure (born 1988)

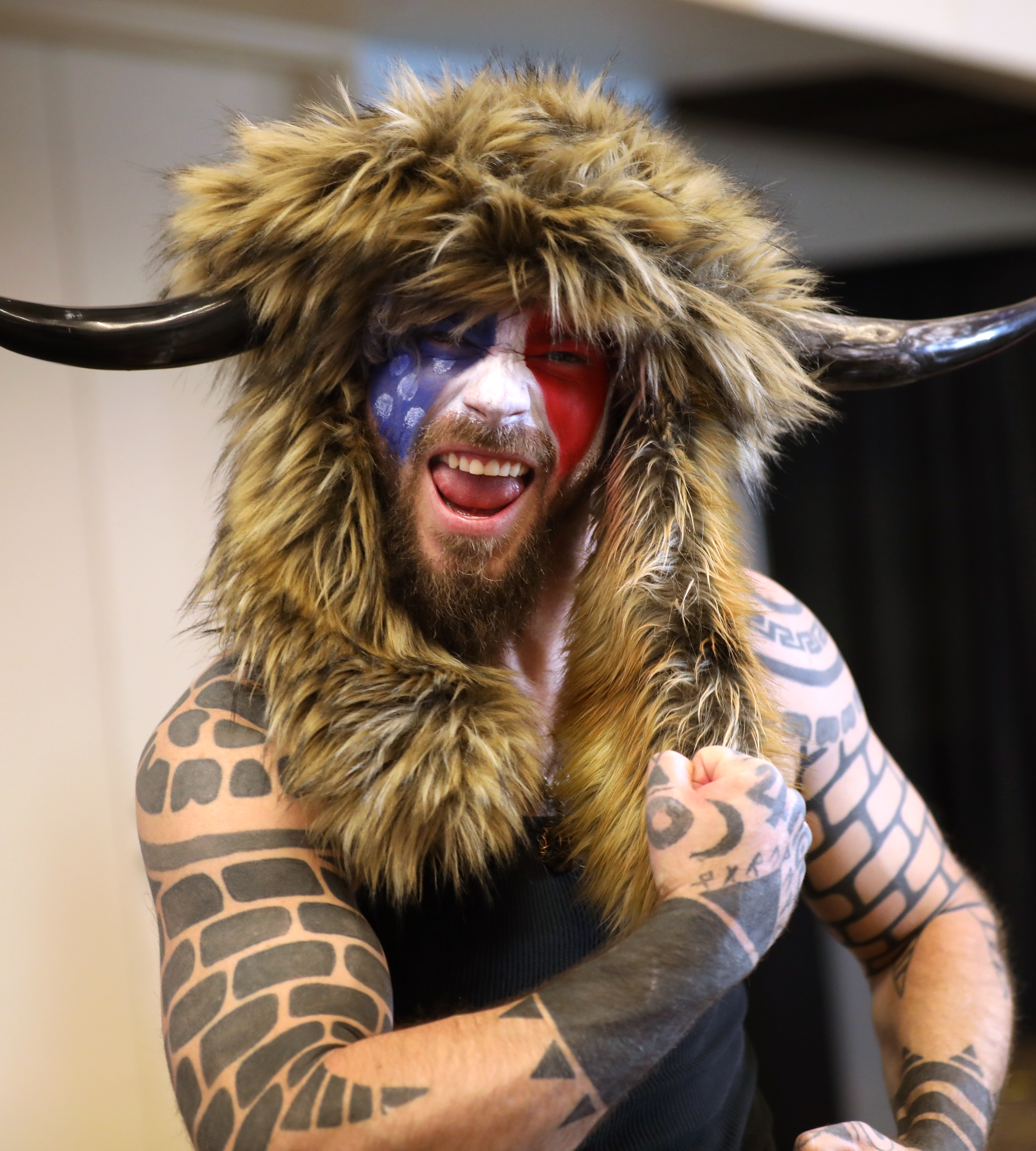
- Chansley in 2023
- Born: Jacob Anthony Chansley; 1988 (age 37–38)
- Other names: Q Shaman; QAnon Shaman; Yellowstone Wolf
- Education: Glendale Community College
- Political party: Libertarian
- Status: Pardoned
- Conviction: Obstructing an official proceeding (18 U.S.C. § 1512)
- Penalty: 41 months in prison, 36 months of supervised release, and $2000 fine

Details
- Date: January 6, 2021
- Location: Washington, D.C.
- Date apprehended: January 9, 2021
- Military career
- Branch: United States Navy
- Service years: 2005–2007
- Rank: Storekeeper Seaman Apprentice
- Unit: USS Kitty Hawk (CV-63)

Jacob Anthony Chansley (born 1988), also known as Jake Angeli, QAnon Shaman, Q Shaman, and Yellowstone Wolf, is an American conspiracy theorist and convicted felon who participated in the January 6 United States Capitol attack, for which he pled guilty to obstructing an official proceeding. He is a former supporter of Donald Trump and a former believer and disseminator of the QAnon conspiracy theory.

Chansley attended demonstrations in the Phoenix, Arizona, area starting around 2019, including a march supporting climate strikes. At rallies, he promoted conspiracy theories supporting Trump, and he has been a counterprotester at Black Lives Matter events.

After being photographed taking part in the January 6 storming of the Capitol, Chansley was arrested on January 9 on federal charges of "Civil Disorder; Obstruction of an Official Proceeding; Entering and Remaining in a Restricted Building; Disorderly and Disruptive Conduct in a Restricted Building; Violent Entry and Disorderly Conduct in a Capitol Building; Parading, Demonstrating, or Picketing in a Capitol Building." He pleaded guilty to a single felony charge in September, and was sentenced to 41 months in prison followed by 36 months supervised release in November 2021. He served out a portion of his sentence at the Federal Correctional Institution, Safford, in Safford, Arizona, and was transferred to a halfway house on March 28, 2023, from which he was released on May 25, 2023.

On January 20, 2025, after beginning his second term in office, President Trump issued pardons to approximately 1,500 individuals charged with crimes connected to the January 6 attack, including Chansley.

== Early life and education ==
Jacob Anthony Chansley was born in 1988 and raised by a single mother, Martha Chansley. He attended Moon Valley High School in Phoenix, Arizona, and Glendale Community College, where he completed some coursework in psychology, religion, philosophy and ceramics.

== Career ==
Chansley enlisted in the United States Navy on September 26, 2005. After basic training and training as a supply clerk, he was assigned to the aircraft carrier USS Kitty Hawk in March 2006. At some point, he refused to take an anthrax vaccine and was scheduled for discharge from the Navy. On September 29, 2007, he was sent to a Transient Personnel Unit in Puget Sound in Washington, and was processed out of the Navy on October 11. After two years and 15 days in uniform, his final rank was Storekeeper Seaman Apprentice. His military awards and decorations include the National Defense Service Medal, the Global War on Terrorism Service Medal, the Sea Service Deployment Ribbon and the Navy and Marine Corps Overseas Service Ribbon.

Chansley self-published two books: Will & Power: Inside the Living Library (Volume 1), published in 2017 under the pen name Loan Wolf; and One Mind at a Time: A Deep State of Illusion, published in 2020 under the name Jacob Angeli. He produced and narrated 11 videos espousing various conspiracy theories and uploaded them to the platform Rumble in late 2020.

Chansley had a profile on the Backstage website seeking work as an actor. In November 2023, he filed a candidate statement of interest to run as a Libertarian in the 2024 election for Arizona's 8th congressional district, but he later failed to submit any petition signatures to get on the ballot. In January 2026, Chansley announced plans to run for governor of Arizona as an independent.

== Role in conspiratorial movement ==
Chansley supported Donald Trump. He has a social media following and has attended rallies supporting QAnon, mostly in and around Phoenix. At various rallies in Arizona, he shouted about QAnon conspiracy theories and carried a sign that said "Q Sent Me!"

Chansley frequently protested alone outside the Arizona Capitol, espousing various conspiracy theories, in 2019. He was described by The Arizona Republic as a shamanic practitioner when attending a climate activism protest in Arizona; and his ideology has been described as ecofascist. In early 2020 he told The Arizona Republic that he began wearing a fur hat and face paint to attract attention, so that he could then talk about QAnon and "other truths". He appeared at a Black Lives Matter (BLM) protest in the Phoenix area in order to spread the QAnon conspiracy theory.

Following the 2020 United States presidential election, Chansley's protests focused on challenging the results of the vote in Arizona. He camped outside the Maricopa County Courthouse during the vote counting process, and gave a speech at a rally there on November 7, the day that Joe Biden was declared president-elect, saying, "This election has not been called! Don't believe that lie! They got their hands caught in the cookie jar and we're going to the Supreme Court! Trump always looks like he's going to lose. And then he wins."

=== Participation in the 2021 Capitol attack ===
During the January 6 United States Capitol attack, Chansley entered the Senate floor in the Capitol wearing his "shamanic" attire, including a bison-horned fur headdress and war paint in red, white and blue, carrying a six-foot-high (1.8 m) spear with an American flag tied below the spear head. He was photographed standing on the raised platform in front of Vice President Mike Pence's chair in the Senate chamber, gaining him significant media attention. He later said police had initially blocked the crowd from entry, but had then specifically allowed them entry, at which point he entered. On March 16, 2021, the U.S. District Court in Washington D.C. released previously unseen video footage of Chansley entering the Capitol building after windows were smashed. Several media outlets have noted that outfit resembled that of British acid jazz band Jamiroquai’s lead singer Jay Kay, which led to Kay jokingly denying his involvement in the riots.

Video footage presented by Tucker Carlson on Fox News in March 2023 depicted Chansley walking through the Capitol building in the company of police officers who appeared to make no visible effort to stop him. Carlson, who was given exclusive access to the security footage by a top congressional Republican, characterized the officers as "tour guides" for Chansley and noted that none of the officers arrested him. U.S. Capitol Police Chief Tom Manger denounced Carlson's segment, calling the show "filled with offensive and misleading conclusions." Manger specifically took issue with Carlson's claim that Capitol Police officers acted as "tour guides" for Chansley. He maintained that Capitol Police officers were badly outnumbered and did their best to use de-escalation tactics to try to talk rioters into leaving the building. Chansley's attorney claimed to have no prior knowledge of the footage, noting that the government is obligated to disclose all evidence – especially exculpatory evidence – and that here the government failed to do so. Because Chansley pleaded guilty, it remains unclear whether this error could cause court proceedings to be affected. The prosecution at the time he pleaded guilty had said they were still reviewing evidence.

Court transcripts reveal Chansley told the FBI that he had traveled to the Capitol "as a part of a group effort, with other 'patriots' from Arizona, at the request of the President that all 'patriots' come to DC on January 6, 2021". Prior to the Capitol being invaded, Chansley called out for the demonstrators to pause and join him in prayer, saying, "Thank you for allowing the United States to be reborn. We love you and we thank you. In Christ's holy name, we pray." After the riot, Chansley told reporters, "The fact that we had a bunch of our traitors in office hunker down, put on their gas masks and retreat into their underground bunker, I consider that a win."

Chansley was listed as a person of interest with the Washington DC Police on January 8. Interviewed while wanted, Chansley said that he believed he did nothing wrong, telling NBC: "I walked through an open door, dude." Chansley told KPNX that he "wasn't worried" about possible charges on January 8. Chansley had no criminal record in Arizona before taking part in the riot.

==== Arrest and criminal proceedings ====
Chansley was arrested and brought up on U.S. federal charges of "knowingly entering or remaining in any restricted building or grounds without lawful authority, and with violent entry and disorderly conduct on Capitol grounds", on January 9. A Capitol police special agent was quoted as saying that he identified Chansley by his "unique attire and extensive tattoos covering his arms and left side of his torso". Chansley voluntarily spoke to the Washington Field Office of the FBI prior to his arrest. In a January 14 court filing, federal prosecutors said that Chansley had left a note on Pence's desk in the Senate chamber that said "It's only a matter of time, justice is coming."

While jailed awaiting trial, Chansley refused to eat because the food served was not organic. Subsequently, a court ordered that he receive organic food.

Chansley was represented by St. Louis attorney Albert Watkins starting in January 2021 until his guilty plea on September 2. In a written statement, Watkins argued that Chansley had no part in the violence, did not hide his identity, was unarmed, not destructive, and followed the instructions of law enforcement officials in a respectful fashion; and that Chansley was carrying a megaphone so his voice could be heard. He also presented evidence Chansley had been diagnosed with schizotypal personality disorder while serving the Navy. He said in an interview with KSDK in St. Louis, "[Chansley] is responsible for his actions. He regrets where he is today". Watkins publicly called on President Trump to pardon his client, arguing that Chansley had been unarmed, not violent or destructive, and had been acting on the "invitation" of the president. Later in January, Chansley made overtures for a presidential pardon from Trump through White House Chief of Staff Mark Meadows.

When the pardon was not granted, Watkins said, "He [Chansley] regrets very very much having not just been duped by the President, but by being in a position where he allowed that duping to put him in a position to make decisions he should not have made." According to Watkins, Chansley was prepared to testify against Trump in his second impeachment trial. However, the trial ended with Trump's acquittal without any witnesses being called.

Federal judge Royce Lamberth ruled on March 8, 2021, that Chansley should not be released from jail, saying his lawyer's arguments were "so frivolous as to insult the Court's intelligence." In a written statement, the judge said the "defendant does not fully appreciate the severity of the allegations against him."

Chansley pleaded guilty to a single count of obstructing an official proceeding on September 3, 2021, and agreed to accept the prosecution's recommended sentence of 41 to 51 months in prison as part of the settlement. Earlier, his lawyer said Chansley broke away from QAnon and asked that it no longer be used in terms for him. Judge Lamberth turned down a request for release (Chansley wanted to visit his grandfather while Watkins wanted to provide him with shelter and care for his mental health) on the grounds that there was no convincing evidence that there would not be any risk of escape.

Chansley was sentenced to 41 months in prison on November 17. He served his sentence at Federal Correctional Institution, Safford in Safford, Arizona, with an original release date of May 25, 2024. On March 30, 2023, attorney Albert Watkins announced Chansley had just been released from prison 14 months early and moved to a halfway house. In November 2021, Chansley told the court, "Men of honor admit when they're wrong. Not just publicly but to themselves. I was wrong for entering the Capitol. I have no excuse. No excuse whatsoever. The behavior is indefensible."

On January 20, 2025, after beginning his second term in office, President Trump issued pardons to Chansley and roughly 1,500 other individuals charged with crimes connected to January 6. Chansley celebrated the pardon on X (formerly Twitter), stating: "J6ers are getting released [and] justice has come. Everything done in the dark will come to light." He also said he would "buy some motha fuckin guns" to commemorate the pardon.

==== Disinformation about affiliation and role ====
After the storming of the Capitol, pro-Trump users on Facebook circulated false rumors that Chansley was not a Trump supporter and right-wing advocate but was instead associated with antifa and the Black Lives Matter (BLM) movement and had infiltrated the event as an agent provocateur. Those false reports frequently included a photo of Chansley at a BLM rally in Arizona, cropping out his "Q Sent Me" sign that indicates he was a counter-protester rather than a participant at the rally.

In a January 6 tweet from his Twitter account, @USAwolfpack, Chansley contradicted speculations made by Trump campaign lawyer Lin Wood: "Mr. Wood. I am not antifa or blm. I'm a Qanon & digital soldier. My name is Jake & I marched with the police & fought against BLM & ANTIFA in PHX." Snopes investigated the statement, concluding that he did attend a BLM rally, that he is not affiliated with antifa, and was an active Trump supporter.

There was also disinformation propagated which falsely claimed Chansley colluded with Nancy Pelosi's son-in-law, Michiel Vos, seen in a photo with him outside the Capitol. Snopes wrote that Vos is a reporter with the Dutch free-to-air television channel RTL Nederland, and the image is from a story on the protests which Vos wrote for the Dutch news program RTL Boulevard.

== Views ==
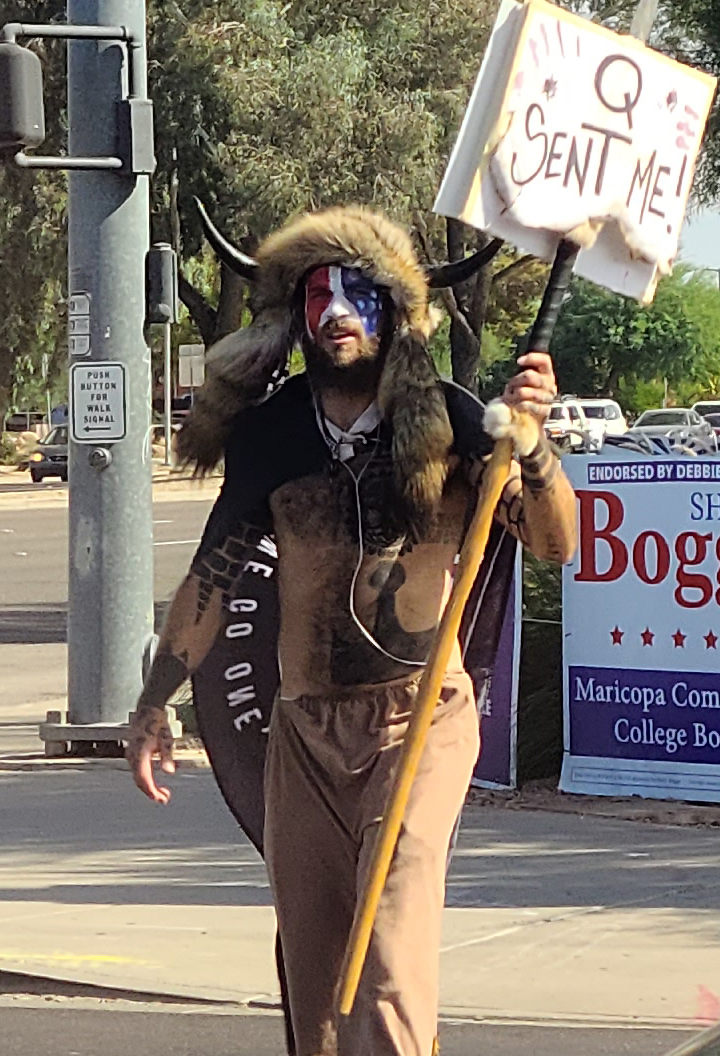
Chansley in 2020

Chansley has stated his unfounded belief that televisions and radios emit "very specific frequencies that are inaudible," that "affect the brain waves of your brain". He has also spoken about the Bilderberg conspiracy theory and said that Freemasons designed Washington, D.C., according to "ley lines" (that crisscross one another at sacred sites of civilizational importance, such as temples, pyramids, the buildings on the National Mall, amplify the Earth's magnetic field, and which have been debunked by archaeologists and statisticians). During a 2020 interview on ORF, Chansley declared that "in order to beat this evil occultic force you need a light occultic force ... [you need] a force that is of the side of God, of love ... almost like on the side of the angels ... as opposed to the demons." In reflecting on the Capitol storming, Chansley said that "What we did on January 6 in many ways was an evolution in consciousness, because as we marched down the street along these ley lines shouting 'USA' or shouting things like 'freedom'... we were actually affecting the quantum realm."

Prosecutors have alleged that Chansley believes he is an alien or higher being and is destined to ascend to another reality; he purports to be a bodhisattva who remains on this plane of reality to lead other conscious beings to ascend this realm. When asked about her son in the wake of the January 2021 attack on the Capitol, his mother, Martha Chansley, said to KNXV-TV, "he's fine," adding that "it takes a lot of courage to be a patriot".

In an interview with journalist George Packer after his release from prison, Chansley expressed great respect for Donald Trump, who, he insisted, had declassified three U.S. patents: “a zero-point-energy engine, infinite free clean energy; a room-temperature superconductor that allows a zero-point-energy engine to function without overheating; and what’s called a TR3B—it’s a triangular-shaped antigravity or inertia-propulsion craft. And when you combine all these things together, you get a whole new socioeconomic-geopolitical system.” He also described the Q poster of QAnon as "a successful psychological operation that disseminated the truth about corruption in our government.”

In July 2025, due to Trump's support for funding Israel during the Gaza genocide and his refusal to release the Epstein files after promising he would release them, Chansley rescinded his support for Trump.

== In popular culture ==
An animated Chansley appears in the 2021 "South ParQ Vaccination Special" episode of South Park, in which he becomes a home school tutor for "Tutornon". A character dressed in attire similar to Chansley's appears in a 2021 episode of It's Always Sunny in Philadelphia titled "2020: A Year In Review", as well as a 2021 episode of Reno 911!. Will Forte's character MacGruber appeared dressed as Chansley in a January 2022 episode of Saturday Night Live. He is also referenced in the 2024 comedy Unfrosted. A member of The Stormchasers, supporters of the Nazi character Stormfront, is dressed like Chansley during season 3 of The Boys. The song "Moon Valley High" from AJJ's 2023 album Disposable Everything is about Chansley. Chansley makes an uncredited appearance as Ali G's DJ in the 2026 movie Ali G: Who Iz I?

== See also ==
- List of cases of the January 6 United States Capitol attack (A-F)
- Criminal proceedings in the January 6 United States Capitol attack
- List of people granted executive clemency in the second Trump presidency
