= Northern Arizona Vocational Institute of Technology =

School district in Arizona, United States

The Northern Arizona Vocational Institute of Technology (NAVIT) is a joint technological education district in northern and eastern Arizona. It offers its programs to its constituent member school districts.

== Member schools ==
- Alchesay High School
- Blue Ridge High School
- Holbrook High School
- Joseph City Junior/Senior High School
- Mogollon High School
- Payson High School (Arizona)
- Round Valley High School
- Show Low High School
- Snowflake High School
- St. Johns High School
- Winslow High School
