= KFBR (Arizona) =

Radio station in Nogales, Arizona (1967–1993)

- Nogales, Arizona; United States
- Frequency: 1340 kHz

Ownership
- Owner: Radio Station KFBR

History
- First air date: September 29, 1967
- Last air date: 1993

Technical information
- Power: 250 watts

KFBR was a radio station on 1340 AM serving Nogales, Arizona. It operated from 1967 to 1993 and was the successor to KNOG, which broadcast on the same frequency from 1948 to 1965. KNOG was the first radio station in Nogales, Arizona, and for its entire existence until 1978, KNOG/KFBR was the only English-language radio station in the city.

== History ==
=== KNOG ===
KNOG went on the air July 25, 1948, as the first radio station in Nogales, Arizona. It was owned by the Border Broadcasting Company and established studios in the Rancho Grande Hotel. The new station broadcast on 1340 kHz with 250 watts. Originally slated for a June 1 launch, the station did not hit the air until July 25. Shortly after going on air, on August 1, it joined the Don Lee Network and Mutual Broadcasting System through its regional affiliate: the Arizona Network, led by KOOL in Phoenix. KNOG joining Don Lee occurred simultaneously with the launch of another Arizona Network station, KCKY in Coolidge. Within its first six months of operation, KNOG had a bone to pick with its Mexican competition, alleging that XEHF in Nogales, Sonora, had illegally retransmitted the Mutual broadcast of the 1948 World Series that KNOG was carrying, though XEHF said it had picked up reports of the Series from a Mexico City shortwave section. Mexican authorities issued a warning to the station, which then proceeded to rebroadcast Associated Press news reports from the Arizona Daily Star (KNOG was a United Press station), prompting the wire service to lodge a formal complaint with Secretary of State Dean Acheson. The United States Department of State also made a formal complaint in the World Series piracy case. The investigation revealed that XEHF had secured permission direct from Gillette, the sponsor of the broadcasts, to carry them, bypassing KNOG and Mutual completely.

KNOG was not in operation a year before it was sold, the first of many station sales in the station's history. Landon Young of La Quinta, California, acquired Border in June 1949 and immediately took over management. However, the sale was never finalized, and in August 1950, Young sued Border to recover the $2,100 loss he had incurred running the radio station for a month. Border was able to successfully sell KNOG in 1952, when the Old Pueblo Broadcasting Company, owners of KOPO in Tucson and 95 percent of KOOL, paid $20,000 for the station. During this time, KNOG also carried programs from the short-lived Liberty Broadcasting System.

KOPO owned KNOG for less than two years, though Old Pueblo wasted little time realigning KNOG into its hookup. On November 2, 1952, it changed the station's network affiliation to CBS, bringing it into the Radio Network of Arizona fold and matching its new sister stations. The Radio Network of Arizona during this time consisted of KOOL, KOPO, KOLD in Yuma, KCKY, and KNOG, alongside the TV stations owned by KOOL and KOPO.

KNOG was sold in 1954 to Charles F. and Alice B. Montano, owners of a Phoenix advertising firm, who paid $20,000. Montano ownership would be the longest-lived in KNOG's history, lasting four. During this time, in 1957, the station ran a "Mystery Tune" contest, only to learn that the winner, Julieta de la Fuente, was the daughter of the owner of a competing station. However, in 1958, the Montanos sold the station to veteran southern Arizona broadcaster Carleton W. Morris for $20,000, with the Federal Communications Commission granting the application in January 1959. Carlos Montano went to work for KOOL after the sale. By this time, KNOG had gone back to the Arizona Network (now led by Phoenix's KOY) and Mutual; when said network switched wholesale to ABC Radio in 1959, KNOG was included in the affiliation switch. Later in 1959, Morris sold the station for $40,000—doubling his investment—to Robert F. Baltrano and Lloyd Burlingham, owner of KCVR in Lodi, California. Just days after the sale was approved, tragedy struck when 19-year-old announcer Frank V. Robles was killed in a traffic accident while returning to Tucson.

As the 1950s turned into the 1960s, KNOG continued to experience ownership turnover. In 1961, Baltrano and Burlingham sold KNOG to Madelon H. Cowling of Van Nuys, California, for $60,000. Cowling owned the station for two years before selling it to Richard H. Ward for $65,000 in 1963. During Ward's ownership, in 1964, KNOG presented 30 hours a week of Spanish programming. It also sued the Mountain States Telephone & Telegraph Company for $10,000 in damages, alleging the phone company failed to do checks and caused the station to miss an hour of a 1963 high school football game being sent to the station from Eloy.

Ward's ownership of the radio station, however, drove him into bankruptcy. He stopped operating KNOG on April 9, 1965—the last day the station would operate under that license and call letters—and filed a bankruptcy petition that August, showing $88,000 in debts to just $10,000 in assets. That May, he had filed to sell the silent KNOG for $80,000 to John W. Bonnett Jr., Peter O'Crotty, and Kenneth Hemmerle. By the time the application had hit the FCC, a new partner had entered: Lloyd Burlingham, who had owned the station between 1959 and 1961. The new owners would have relocated the station from the La Hacienda Motor Hotel, to which KNOG had moved, back to the Rancho Grande. However, this application was never consummated, and the license was canceled.

The KNOG call letters were assigned on June 30, 1978, to a college radio station in Havre, Montana, which changed to KNMC in 1985. The call letters would return to Nogales when KNOG, a noncommercial Christian FM station, signed on December 16, 1995.

=== KFBR ===
Before 1965 was over, an applicant had stepped into the void formed by KNOG's closure. Frank Baranowski, a motel and restaurant owner, filed with the FCC on November 1 for a construction permit for a new station on 1340. Baranowski's application was granted on February 1, 1967. KFBR acquired the former KNOG facilities in a sheriff's auction and went on the air September 29, 1967. The new station carried English-language programming during the daytime hours and Spanish-language shows at night and was affiliated with KTAR's Arizona Broadcasting System.

KFBR signed on September 29, 1967. Baranowski died in 1975. In 1981, KFBR had a format of middle-of-the-road music with a handful of Spanish programs, as well as affiliation with the ABC Information network and CBS. It was a small operation, with just three full-time and three part-time employees. KFBR finally got competition in Nogales, Arizona, when Top 40-formatted KAYN 98.3 signed on in 1978; the station later moved toward Tucson.

The station remained on the air throughout the 1980s with a country format, finally being reported silent in April 1993. The license renewal was dismissed and KFBR call letters deleted in August 1993.
