= Southwest Technical Education District of Yuma =

Joint technological education district in Yuma County, Arizona

The Southwest Technical Education District of Yuma (STEDY) is a joint technological education district in Yuma County, Arizona. Established in January 2015 as the result of a public vote in November 2014, STEDY is Arizona's 14th JTED and serves the Yuma Union High School District and Antelope Union High School District, as well as all high school kids in Yuma County.
