= Cobre Valley Institute of Technology =

School district in Arizona, United States

- Arizona; United States

Information
- Type: Joint technological education district

The Cobre Valley Institute of Technology (CVIT) is a joint technological education district serving east-central Arizona.

== Member high schools ==
- Hayden High School
- Globe High School
- Miami High School
- San Carlos High School
- Superior High School
