= Corona de Tucson, Arizona =

CDP in Pima County, Arizona

- CDP
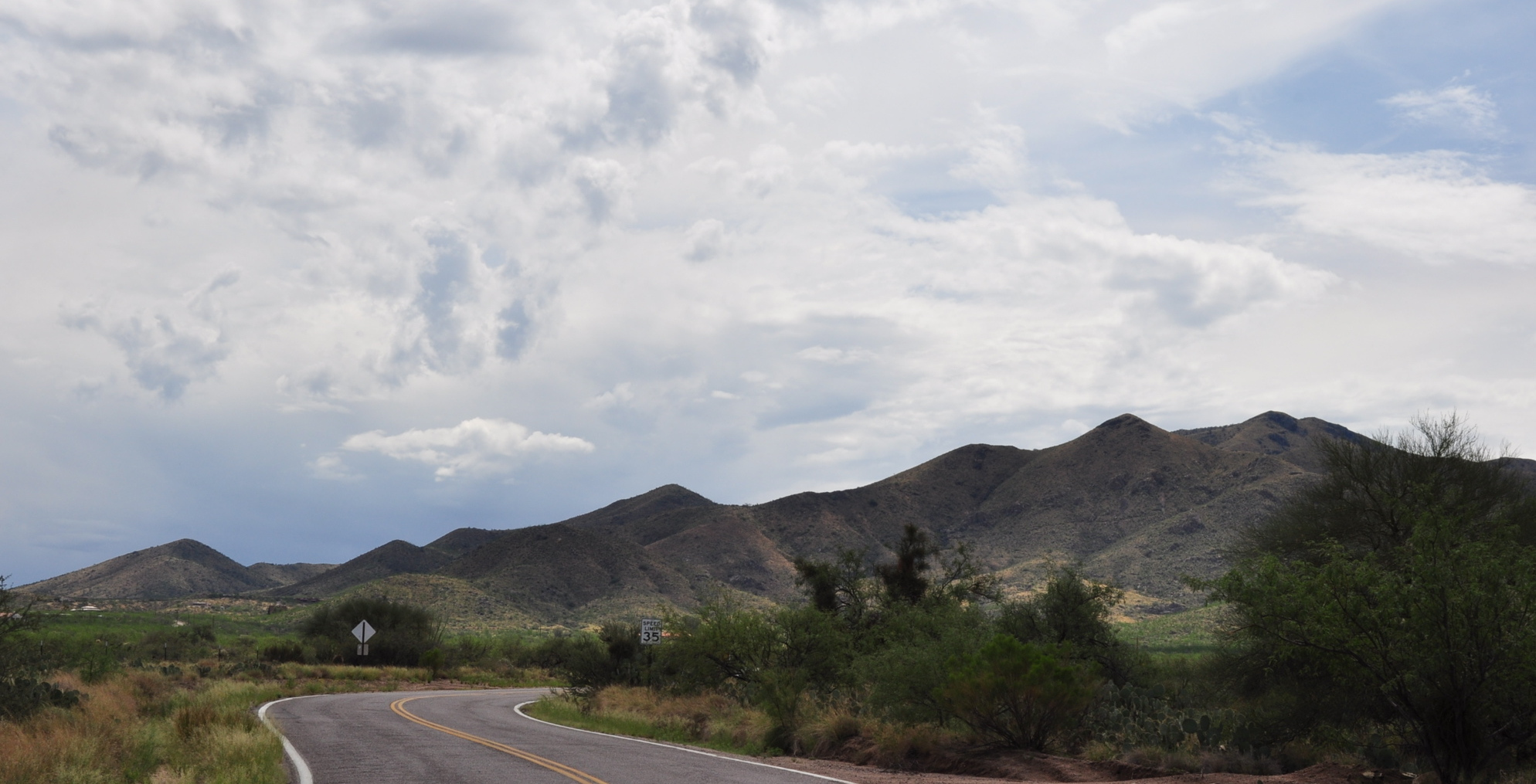
- Corona de Tucson and Santa Rita foothills

- Location in Pima County and the state of Arizona

- Location within Arizona Location within the United States
- Coordinates: 31°57′28″N 110°46′2″W
- Country: United States
- State: Arizona
- County: Pima

Area
  - Total: 7.68 sq mi (19.90 km^{2})
  - Land: 7.68 sq mi (19.90 km^{2})
  - Water: 0 sq mi (0.00 km^{2})
- Elevation: 3,300 ft (1,000 m)

Population (2020)
  - Total: 9,240
  - Density: 1,202.8/sq mi (464.39/km^{2})
- Time zone: UTC-7 (MST (no DST))
- ZIP code: 85641
- Area code: 520
- FIPS code: 04-16030
- GNIS feature ID: 37250

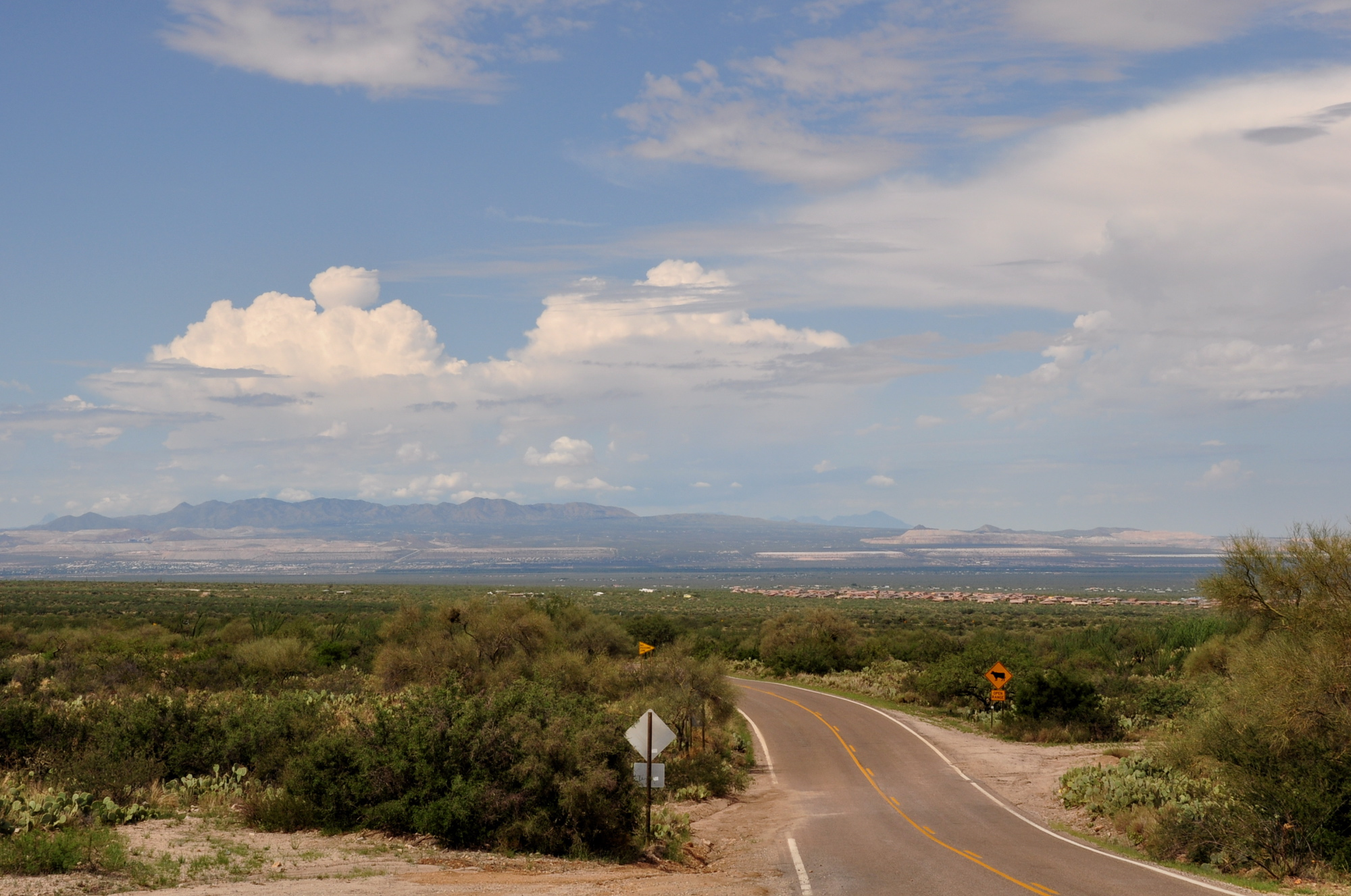
View of Sierrita Mountains and copper mines from Corona de Tucson

Corona de Tucson is a census-designated place (CDP) in Pima County, Arizona, United States. The population was 9,240 at the 2020 census, an increase of 1036% from the 2000 population of 813.

== Geography ==
Corona de Tucson is located at 31°57′28″N 110°46′2″W (31.957860, -110.767238), in the foothills of the Santa Rita Mountains, and adjacent to the Coronado National Forest.

According to the United States Census Bureau, the CDP has a total area of 2.6 square miles (6.7 km^{2}), all land.

== Demographics ==
Historical population
Census	Pop.	Note	%±
2020	9,240		—
U.S. Decennial Census

=== 2020 census ===
As of the 2020 census, Corona de Tucson had a population of 9,240. The median age was 35.6 years. 31.2% of residents were under the age of 18 and 11.3% of residents were 65 years of age or older. For every 100 females there were 97.6 males, and for every 100 females age 18 and over there were 94.9 males age 18 and over.

83.2% of residents lived in urban areas, while 16.8% lived in rural areas.

There were 3,013 households in Corona de Tucson, of which 44.9% had children under the age of 18 living in them. Of all households, 69.7% were married-couple households, 11.1% were households with a male householder and no spouse or partner present, and 13.8% were households with a female householder and no spouse or partner present. About 13.2% of all households were made up of individuals and 5.1% had someone living alone who was 65 years of age or older.

There were 3,137 housing units, of which 4.0% were vacant. The homeowner vacancy rate was 2.3% and the rental vacancy rate was 3.3%.

Racial composition as of the 2020 census
Race	Number	Percent
White	6,670	72.2%
Black or African American	356	3.9%
American Indian and Alaska Native	103	1.1%
Asian	194	2.1%
Native Hawaiian and Other Pacific Islander	15	0.2%
Some other race	535	5.8%
Two or more races	1,367	14.8%
Hispanic or Latino (of any race)	2,184	23.6%

=== Demographic estimates ===
According to U.S. Census Bureau QuickFacts, 98% of residents age 25 and older were high school graduates or higher, and 45.7% held a bachelor's degree or higher.

=== Income and poverty ===
U.S. Census Bureau QuickFacts reported a median household income of $96,396 and a poverty rate of 2.9%.

=== 2010 census ===
As of the 2010 census, there were 5,675 people, 2,165 households, and 280 families in the CDP. The population density was 932.2 inhabitants per square mile (359.9/km^{2}). There were 395 housing units at an average density of 154.1 per square mile (59.5/km^{2}). The racial makeup of the CDP was 85.8% White, 5.3% Black or African American, 0.5% Native American, 0.6% Asian, 3.2% from other races, and 4.6% from two or more races. 24.9% of the population were Hispanic or Latino of any race.

=== 2000 census ===
At the 2000 census, of the 813 households 17.8% had children under the age of 18 living with them, 68.1% were married couples living together, 4.3% had a female householder with no husband present, and 25.3% were non-families. 21.3% of households were one person and 8.5% were one person aged 65 or older. The average household size was 2.16 and the average family size was 2.48. The age distribution was 13.9% under the age of 18, 4.1% from 18 to 24, 19.4% from 25 to 44, 38.6% from 45 to 64, and 24.0% 65 or older. The median age was 51 years. For every 100 females, there were 91.7 males. For every 100 females age 18 and over, there were 91.8 males. The median household income was $93,542, and the median family income was $61,375. Males had a median income of $49,722 versus $31,250 for females. The per capita income for the CDP was $28,304. None of the families and 1.0% of the population were living below the poverty line, including no under eighteens and none of those over 64.

== Education ==
The entire CDP is served by the Vail Unified School District,. and the Pima County Joint Technical Education District’s 4th Governing Board District.

== Public Safety ==
Corona de Tucson is patrolled by the 1st Beat of the Pima County Sheriff's Department's Rincon District and fire protection is provided by the Corona de Tucson Fire District.

== See also ==
- Santa Rita Mountains
