= Arizona State Route 366 =

State highway in Arizona, United States

State Route 366
- Mount Graham Road
- SR 366 highlighted in red

Route information
- Maintained by ADOT
- Length: 28.33 mi (45.59 km)
- Existed: 1960–present
- Tourist routes: Swift Trail Parkway

Major junctions
- West end: Near Mount Graham
- East end: US 191 at Swift Trail Junction

Location
- Country: United States
- State: Arizona

Highway system
- Arizona State Highway System; Interstate; US; State; Scenic Proposed; Former
← SR 364	→ SR 373

State Route 366 (SR 366) is a highway in Graham County, Arizona that runs from its junction with US 191 south of Safford to near the summit of Mount Graham. It is a winding mountain road with one half primarily a northwest-southeast route, the other half being northeast-southwest.

== Route description ==
SR 366 is a 28.33-mile (45.59 km) highway that connects Mount Graham with US 191 (originally US 666) at Swift Trail Junction south of Safford. The western terminus of the highway is located near a ranger station near the peak of Mount Graham. The highway heads in a southeastern route as it descends the mountain. There are several hair pin turns as the highway follows the terrain. At Turkey Flat, the highway goes through a series of five hair pin turns. The highway also begins to generally head in a northeasterly direction from this point on. The terrain eventually smooths out and the highway follows a straight path towards the northeast to its eastern terminus at US 191.

SR 366 traverses sparsely inhabited forest and mountain terrain and does not pass through any cities or towns aside from minor settlements. The highway does provide access to Mount Graham, one of the higher peaks in Arizona at over 10,000 feet (3,000 m). It also provides access to the Mount Graham International Observatory. Part of SR 366 is designated as the Swift Trail Parkway under the Arizona Parkways, Historic and Scenic Roads program.

== History ==
SR 366 was established in 1960 from a junction with US 666 (now US 191) to the southwest for 6.3 miles (10.1 km). Later that same year, it was extended an additional 22 miles (35 km) to the Columbine Ranger Station. At this time the road was a gravel road providing access to the Coronado National Forest. Since that time, the easternmost 21.7 miles (34.9 km) have been paved while the rest remains as a gravel road.

== Junction list ==
The entire route is in Graham County.

Location	mi	km	Destinations	Notes
	28.33	45.59	Columbine Ranger Station	Western terminus
Stretch of road closed winters
	21.67	34.87	Boy Scout Camp Road	Begin pavement
Swift Trail Junction	0.00	0.00	US 191 / Swift Trail – Safford, Willcox	Eastern terminus
1.000 mi = 1.609 km; 1.000 km = 0.621 mi
