= Pima Unified School District =

School district in Arizona

The Pima Unified School District is located in Pima, Arizona serving the communities of Pima, Bryce, and Eden in southeastern Arizona. It operates an elementary school, junior high school, and Pima High School, as well as the small Gila Valley Learning Center.
