= Pima County Joint Technical Education District =

School district in Arizona, United States

Address
- 2855 West Master Pieces Drive Tucson, Arizona, 85741; United States

District information
- Type: Public
- Grades: 9–12
- NCES District ID: 0400752

Students and staff
- Students: 177
- Teachers: 39.05
- Staff: 56.6
- Student–teacher ratio: 4.53

Other information
- Website: www.pimajted.org

The Pima County Joint Technical Education District is a joint technological education district mostly serving schools in Pima County, Arizona, though its membership also includes one school district in Pinal County and one in Santa Cruz County.

== Member school districts ==
- Ajo Unified School District
- Amphitheater Unified School District
- Baboquivari Unified School District
- Catalina Foothills Unified School District
- Flowing Wells Unified School District
- Mammoth-San Manuel Unified School District
- Marana Unified School District
- Sahuarita Unified School District
- Santa Cruz Valley Unified School District
- Sunnyside Unified School District
- Tanque Verde Unified School District
- Tucson Unified School District
- Vail Unified School District
