= Altar Valley Elementary School District =

School district in Arizona, United States

Altar Valley School District 51

Address
- 10105 South Sasabe Road Three Points, Pima County, Arizona, 85736-1226; United States

District information
- Type: Public school district
- Motto: Challenging all students to achieve excellence
- Grades: PK–8
- Established: 1928; 97 years ago
- Superintendent: David Dumon
- Schools: Robles Elementary (PK–4), Altar Valley Middle School (5–8)
- Budget: $9,340,000
- NCES District ID: 0404770
- District ID: AZ-4418

Students and staff
- Students: 585
- Teachers: 23.5 (on an FTE basis)
- Staff: 58.18 (on an FTE basis)
- Student–teacher ratio: 24.89:1

Other information
- Governing board members: President: W. John Williams Vice-President: Shanee Page; Member: Robert Ethridge Member: Martin Hudecek; Member: Chris Isabel
- Website: www.altarvalleyschools.org/Home

Altar Valley School District 51 is a public school district in Pima County, Arizona, United States.

In 2011, the Altar Valley School District Governing Board was named the Lou Ella Kleinz Award of Excellence recipient by the Arizona School Boards Association. This is ASBA's highest honor.
