= Pima High School =

Location
- 38 E. 200 South; Pima, Arizona 85543; United States
- Coordinates: 32°53′35″N 109°49′32″W

Information
- School type: Public high school
- School district: Pima Unified School District
- CEEB code: 030330
- Principal: Cody Barlow
- Teaching staff: 23.67 (FTE)
- Grades: 9-12
- Enrollment: 351 (2023-2024)
- Student to teacher ratio: 14.83
- Colors: Royal blue, gold and white
- Mascot: Roughriders
- Website: www.pimaschools.org/High-School

Pima High School is a high school in Pima, Arizona. It is operated by the Pima Unified School District, which also operates an elementary school and junior high school.

== Athletics ==
Football – State Champions: 2015
