= Spokane Police Department =

Law enforcement in Spokane, Washington, US

Coordinates: 47.6656°N 117.4276°W

- Abbreviation: SPD

Agency overview
- Formed: 1881

Jurisdictional structure
- Operations jurisdiction: Washington, US
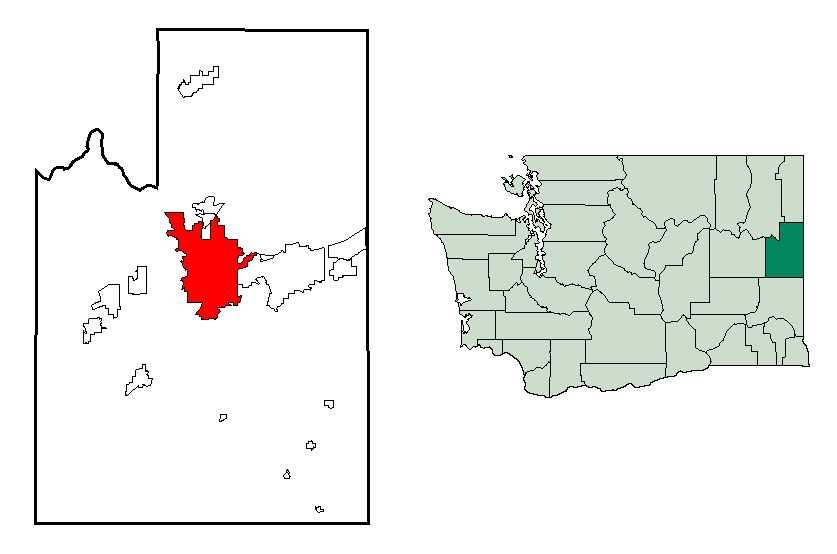
- Spokane Police jurisdiction
- Area: 60.2 square miles (156 km^{2})
- Population: 228,989
- Legal jurisdiction: City of Spokane
- General nature: Local civilian police

Operational structure
- Headquarters: Spokane, Washington
- Police Officers: 310
- Agency executive: Kevin Hall, Chief of Police

Website
- my.spokanecity.org/police/

The Spokane Police Department is the agency responsible for law enforcement in Spokane, Washington. The department was founded in 1881. As of 2015, the department had 310 sworn officers. As of 2025, Kevin Hall is the Chief of Police.
