= Mogollon High School =

High school in Arizona, United States

- Home of the Mustangs

Location
- 3450 Mustang Avenue; Heber, Arizona, Navajo County 85928; United States; 34°26′09″N 110°35′11″W

Information
- Type: Public High school
- Motto: "A Tradition of Champions"
- Established: 1990 (36 years ago)
- School district: Heber-Overgaard Unified School District
- CEEB code: 030166
- Principal: Reed Porter
- Grades: 9–12
- Enrollment: 159 (2022-2023)
- Colors: Red, silver, and black
- Fight song: "We’re the Mustangs of Mogollon High! With the spirit of freedom burning bright, The Mustangs will hold their heads high! Unconquered as yet we’ll continue to fight, We’re the Mustangs of Mogollon High! We’re proud of our school, a dream come true. We’ll do our best and be loyal to you! Wearing red, black, and silver with heartfelt pride! We’re the Mustangs of Mogollon High!
- Athletics conference: 1A - Central
- Nickname: Mustangs
- Website: www.heberovergaardschools.org/mogollon-high-school

Mogollon High School (MHS) is a public high school located in Heber, Arizona, United States. The school was established in 1989, and is the only high school under the jurisdiction of the Heber-Overgaard Unified School District. The school enrolls an estimated 135 students in grades 9–12, and operates on a traditional school calendar. Mogollon's colors are Red, Silver and Black and the teams are collectively called the Mustangs. The school is a member of the Arizona Interscholastic Association's 1A Central Athletics Conference and competes in Division Division IV sports. Mogollon junior high (grades 7-8) is located at the same site as the high school.

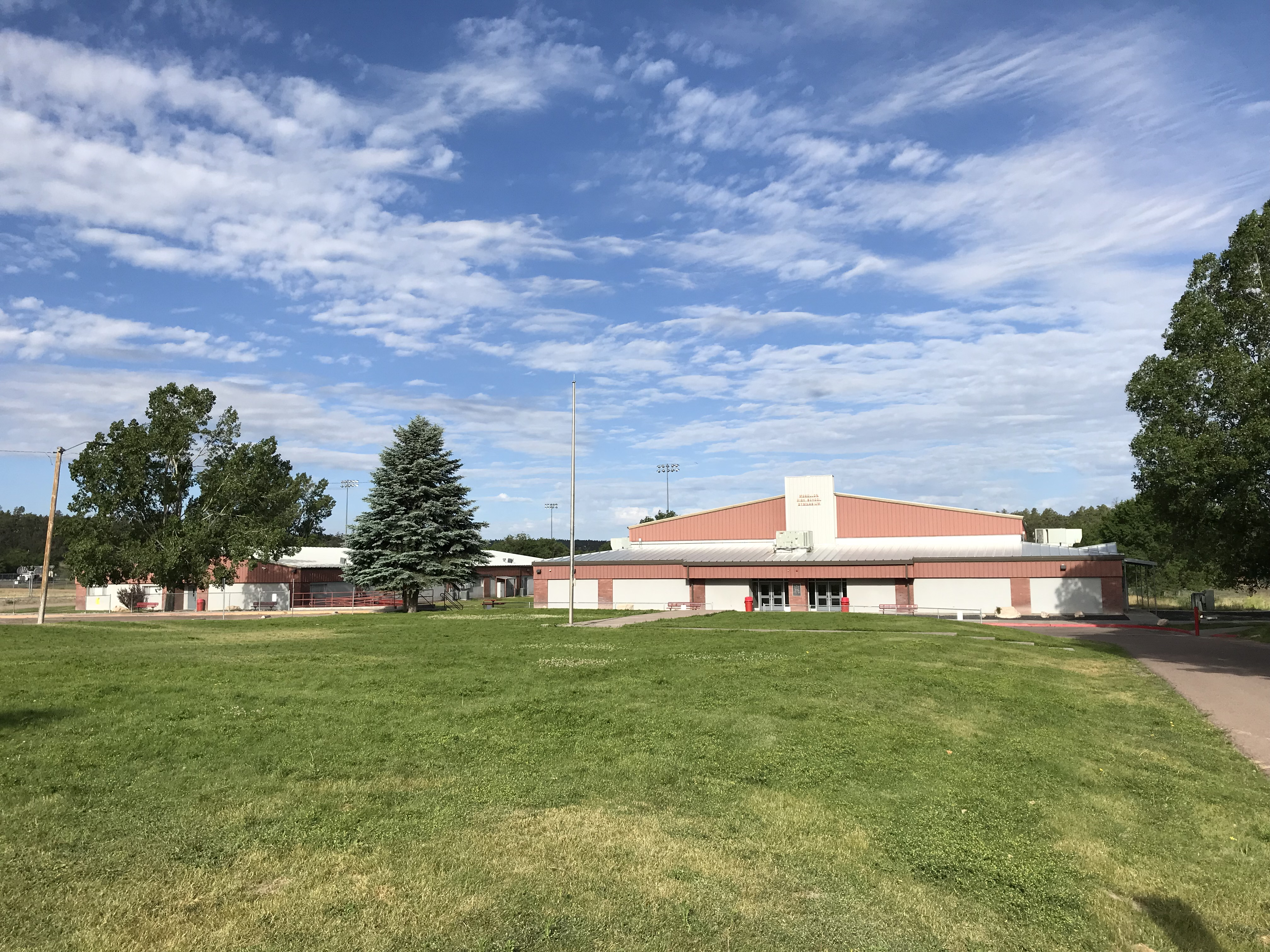
Mogollon High School

== History ==
As the population of Heber and Overgaard grew, a local high school was planned. Prior to the school's construction, two buses shuttled students to and from Snowflake in order to attend high school classes. The school was established in 1989, with high school classes and sporting events held at Capps Elementary School until school buildings could be completed. Construction for Mogollon High School, by Spencer-Trulson, began on June 12, 1989. The site was formerly used for rodeo grounds and later a sawmill. The school was named after the nearby Mogollon Rim. The buildings were accepted by the governing board January 5, 1990. Funds were not immediately available to complete landscaping, purchase a stage, put in all of the gym bleachers or finish the office. A public dedication ceremony was held for the new school on January 18, 1990.

On October 21, 2019, the science teacher Melinda Porter was arrested and charged with furnishing harmful items to a minor, aggravated assault on a minor, and kidnapping.

== Demographics ==
As of 2018, there were 15 total teachers, principals, and other school leaders and 125 students currently enrolled in the district with enrollment listed at 100%. Of the 15 teachers, principals, and other school leaders, 11 (73.33%) are listed as having greater than 3 years experience in the field and 3 of 15 are listed as having emergency credentials to teach out of the subject area in which they are certified.

The racial makeup of the students, in 2018, was 80% White, 10.4% Hispanic, and 9.6% redacted. The four-year graduation rate within the first 4 years of enrolling in high school was 88.89%. Graduation rates were broken down to: 89.74% Male, 88.24% Female, 100% Hispanic, 66.7% Low SES, 100% Native American, 100% Special Education, and 84.62% White. In 2018, reports indicate 29 students were enrolled in at least one advanced placement course, 20 students with chronic absenteeism, 10 indents of violence and 0 students reported as harassed or bullied based on sex, race, color, national origin or disability.

== Academics ==
In the fiscal year 2018, the Arizona Department of Education published an annual achievement profile for Mogollon High School resulting in a grade of "B" based on an A through F scale. Scores were based on "year to year student academic growth, proficiency on English language arts, math and science, the proficiency and academic growth of English language learners, indicators that an elementary student is ready for success in high school and that high school students are ready to succeed in a career or higher education and high school graduation rates".

The United States national nonprofit organization, GreatSchools, gives Mogollon High School a 6/10 (about average) overall rating noting that students perform "about average on state tests, have far above average college readiness measures, and this school has below average results in how well it’s serving disadvantaged students". The organization gives Mogollon High School a 7/10 for "college readiness", 6/10 for standardized "test scores", 3/10 for "equity" (disadvantaged students at this school may be falling behind), and 3/10 for "low-income students" (test scores for low income students fall below the state average).

== Extracurricular activities ==
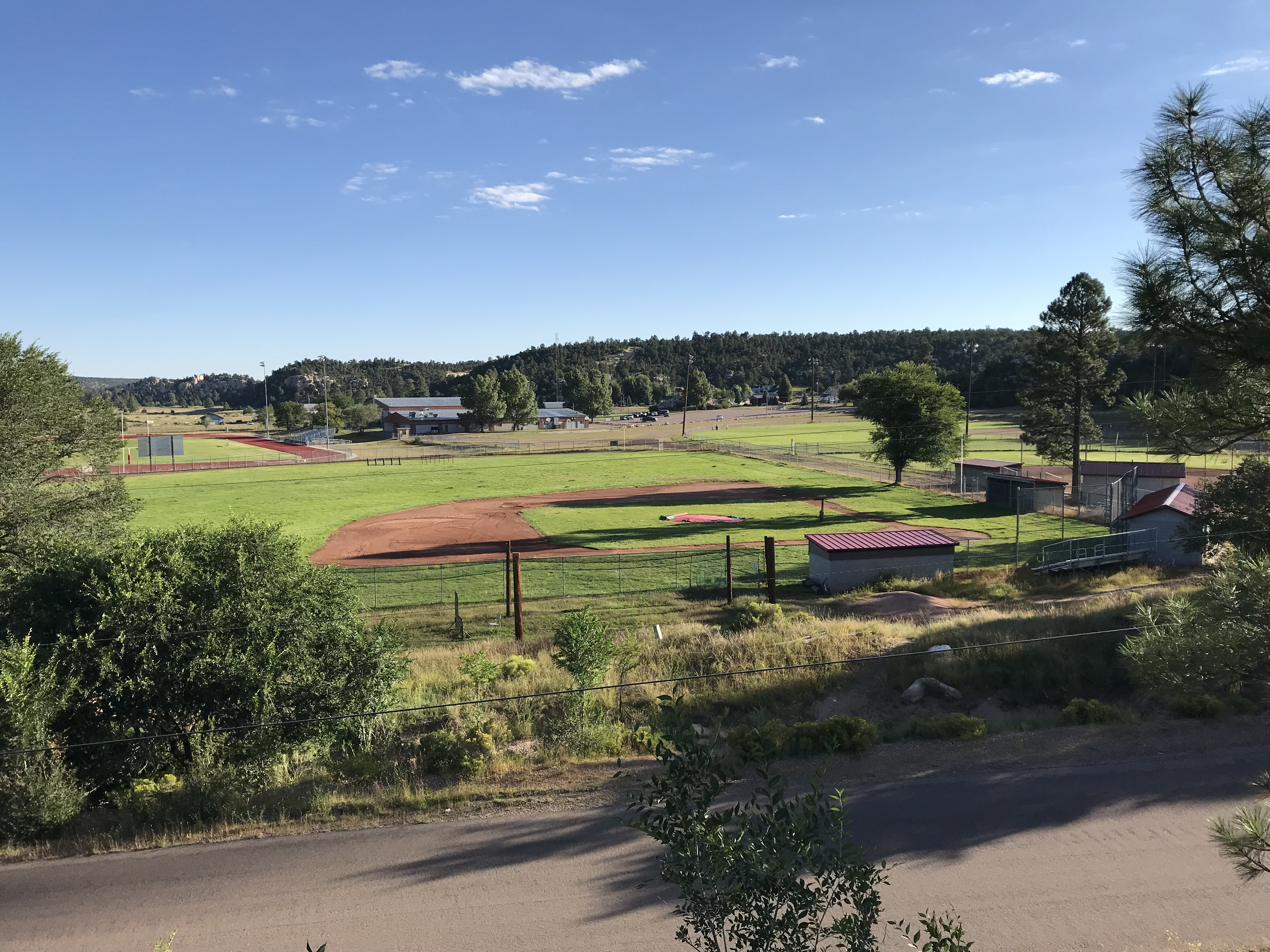
Mogollon High School baseball fields

=== Athletics ===
Mogollon High School competes in interscholastic athletics in several sports. The school is 1 of 9 high schools in the Arizona 1A Central Athletics Conference and competes in Division Division IV sports.

State championships for the Mustangs in athletics include the following:

- Baseball (Boys): 1992, 2006 and 2019
- Basketball (Girls): 2019
- Football (Boys): 1994, 2003, 2008, 2014, 2021, 2022, and 2023
- Softball (Girls): 1996, 2004 and 2006
- Track and Field (Girls): 1999
- Volleyball (Girls): 2018
- Wrestling (Boys): 1995 and 2011

=== Clubs and activities ===
- National Honor Society
- Robotics
- Ski Club
- Spanish Club
