= Parker Unified School District =

School district in Arizona, United States

Address
- 1608 South Laguna Avenue Parker, Arizona, 85344; United States

District information
- Type: Public
- Grades: PreK–12
- NCES District ID: 0405980

Students and staff
- Students: 1,814
- Teachers: 105.0
- Staff: 150.75
- Student–teacher ratio: 17.28

Other information
- Website: www.parkerusd.org

Parker Unified School District is a school district in La Paz County, Arizona.
