= Leslie Newton Goodding =

American botanist (1880–1967)

- Born: 1880
- Died: 1967 (aged 86–87); Tucson, Arizona
- Education: University of Wyoming; University of Montana
- Children: Charlotte Goodding Reeder
- Scientific career
- Fields: Botany
- Academic advisors: Aven Nelson
- Author abbrev. (botany): Goodd.

Leslie Newton Goodding (1880–1967) was an American botanist who was considered an expert in the flora of the Southwestern United States. The standard author abbreviation Goodd. is used to indicate this person as the author when citing a botanical name.

== Biography ==
Goodding attended the University of Wyoming from 1899 to 1903, learning botany under Aven Nelson. He spent his summers collecting with Nelson and associate Elias Nelson in Wyoming, Utah, Nevada, and Colorado. Goodding also went to the University of Montana, studying botany, plant pathology and pedagogy. He moved to Arizona where he began to teach. He worked at institutions located in Benson, Bisbee and Flagstaff. Goodding also was employed by several government agencies throughout his career, mainly concerning erosion control. He developed a strong conservation ethic and worked to preserve the biodiversity of southern Arizona.

== Legacy ==
Several species are named for Goodding, including: Sideranthus gooddingii, Salix gooddingii, Verbena gooddingii, Allium gooddingii, and Glandularia gooddingii. The Goodding Research Area at Sycamore Canyon also bears his name.

Charlotte Goodding Reeder was Goodding's daughter.
