= Lorenzochloa erectifolia =

Scientific classification
- Kingdom: Plantae
- Clade: Tracheophytes
- Clade: Angiosperms
- Clade: Monocots
- Clade: Commelinids
- Order: Poales
- Family: Poaceae
- Subfamily: Pooideae
- Supertribe: Stipodae
- Tribe: Stipeae
- Genus: Lorenzochloa
- Species: L. erectifolia

Binomial name
- Lorenzochloa erectifolia (Swallen) Reeder & C.Reeder

Synonyms
- Muhlenbergia erectifolia Swallen; Ortachne erectifolia (Swallen) Clayton; Parodiella erectifolia (Swallen) Reeder & C.Reeder

Genus of grasses

Lorenzochloa erectifolia is a species of perennial flowering plant in the grass family. The species is native to Colombia, Costa Rica, Ecuador, Peru and Venezuela.

The genus name Lorenzochloa is in honour of Lorenzo Raimundo Parodi (1895–1966), who was an Argentine botanist and agricultural engineer, professor of botany in Buenos Aires and La Plata with a focus on South American grasses.

The species was first described as Muhlenbergia erectifolia by Jason Richard Swallen in 1931. It was later placed in the genus Ortachne as Ortachne erectifolia, until phylogenetic analysis.
