= Jeff Darwin =

American baseball player (born 1969)

- Pitcher
- Born: July 6, 1969 (age 56); Sherman, Texas, U.S.
- Batted: Right Threw: Right

MLB debut
- June 13, 1994, for the Seattle Mariners

Last MLB appearance
- September 27, 1997, for the Chicago White Sox

MLB statistics
- Win–loss record: 0–2
- Earned run average: 4.47
- Strikeouts: 25
- Stats at Baseball Reference

Teams
- Seattle Mariners (1994); Chicago White Sox (1996–1997)

Jeffrey Scott Darwin (born July 6, 1969) is an American former professional baseball pitcher. He played three seasons in Major League Baseball (MLB) for the Seattle Mariners and Chicago White Sox.

== Career ==
Darwin attended Bonham High School in Bonham, Texas, where he played baseball, basketball, and football and ran track and field. Darwin was selected by the Seattle Mariners in the 46th round of the 1987 Major League Baseball draft after high school but instead accepted a scholarship to play college baseball at Alvin Community College in Alvin, Texas. The Mariners selected him in the 13th round of the following season's draft and he chose to sign. He was assigned to the Bellingham Mariners of the Northwest League to begin his professional career. Darwin was converted from a starting pitcher to a relief pitcher during the 1992 season while pitching for the Peninsula Pilots. Years later, Darwin told the Daily Press that the move had "worked out perfectly" for his career. Following the 1992 season, he was added to the team's 40-man roster.

On June 27, 1993, the Mariners traded Darwin to the Florida Marlins along with Henry Cotto in exchange for Dave Magadan. Darwin pitched poorly in his brief time in the Marlins' farm system and was traded back to Seattle that offseason, again in exchange for Magadan. Darwin got the news while pitching in the Mexican Pacific League.

Darwin made his Major League debut on June 13, 1994, with the Mariners against the Texas Rangers. According to the Chicago Tribune, "[n]erves got him" in his brief stint with the Mariners. He gave up six runs in four innings pitched and, "[f]or practical purposes, he was finished with the Mariners." He returned to the minor leagues the following season and was named a Triple-A All-Star in 1995.

On October 9, 1995, the Mariners traded Darwin to the Chicago White Sox as the player to be named later in a July trade which had brought them outfielder Warren Newson. During spring training in 1996, he roomed with his brother, Danny Darwin, who was in camp with the Pittsburgh Pirates. Darwin was called up to the majors from Triple-A Nashville on July 3 and was used somewhat lightly in relief for the remainder of the season. Prior to the 1997 season, the White Sox signed Danny Darwin, and the brothers were united on the same team for the first time in their lives. The elder Darwin would be traded away before the younger Darwin could appear in a game for the White Sox, however. On August 17, 1997, the White Sox added Darwin to the roster after Bill Simas was placed on the disabled list. He played out the rest of the year on the major league roster. It would be his final season in the majors.

Prior to the 1998 season, Darwin signed with the San Francisco Giants where he was again reunited in spring training with his older brother. Darwin spent the season in the minor leagues and finished tied for second place in the Pacific Coast League in saves. The following year, Darwin appeared in only eight games in the San Diego Padres farm system due at least in part to shoulder problems. It would be his final season in professional baseball.

Darwin began serving as a pitching coach at Benson High School in Benson, Arizona, in 2016.

== Personal life ==
Darwin's older brother is fellow major league pitcher Danny Darwin, though they were born 14 years apart and, according to Danny, had a relationship "more like father and son." Their middle brother played college baseball at Southeastern Oklahoma State, was drafted twice, and coached baseball at North Central Texas College.

Darwin has three daughters. His daughter Emily played college softball at Yavapai College and Grand Canyon University. Darwin's nephew played baseball at North Central Texas College and Texas Tech.
