= Lorenzochloa =

Scientific classification
- Kingdom: Plantae
- Clade: Tracheophytes
- Clade: Angiosperms
- Clade: Monocots
- Clade: Commelinids
- Order: Poales
- Family: Poaceae
- Subfamily: Pooideae
- Tribe: Stipeae
- Genus: Lorenzochloa; Reeder & C.Reeder

Species
- 8; see text

Synonyms
- Anatherostipa (Hack. ex Kuntze) Peñail.; Nicoraella Torres; Parodiella Reeder & C.Reeder, nom. illeg.

Genus of flowering plants

Lorezochloa is a genus of flowering plants in the grass family, Poaceae. It includes eight species native to the tropical Americas, ranging from northeastern Mexico to northwestern Venezuela and northwestern Argentina.

The genus is named in honour of Lorenzo Raimundo Parodi (1895–1966), who was an Argentinian botanist and agricultural engineer, professor of botany in Buenos Aires and La Plata with a focus on South American grasses.

== Species ==
Eight species are accepted.

- Lorenzochloa bomanii (Hauman) Romasch.
- Lorenzochloa erectifolia (Swallen) Reeder & C.Reeder
- Lorenzochloa henrardiana (Parodi) Romasch.
- Lorenzochloa mucronata (Griseb.) Romasch.
- Lorenzochloa obtusa (Nees & Meyen) Romasch.
- Lorenzochloa orurensis (F.Rojas) Romasch.
- Lorenzochloa rigidiseta (Pilg.) Romasch.
- Lorenzochloa venusta (Phil.) Romasch.
