= Apache Nitrogen Products =

American explosives manufacturer in Arizona

Coordinates: 31.8804°N 110.2404°W

- Formerly: Apache Powder Company
- Type: Private
- Industry: Explosives
- Founded: 1920; 106 years ago in New Jersey
- Founder: Charles E. Mills
- Headquarters: St. David, Arizona, U.S.
- Area served: Worldwide
- Number of employees: 95 (2012)
- Website: www.apachenitrogen.com

Apache Nitrogen Products (formerly Apache Powder Company) began in 1920 as an American manufacturer of nitroglycerin-based explosives (dynamite) for the mining industry and other regional users of dynamite. The company changed its name to Apache Nitrogen Products in 1990 to reflect the true nature of its operations, which now were based on nitric acid and ammonium nitrate products. Dynamite and other explosive manufacturing operations had ended. Company products are used in the regional mining and fertilizer industries. It occupies a historic location in Cochise County, Arizona and is one of its largest employers.

The company is located on Apache Powder Road, in an unincorporated area outside St. David, Arizona. The plant's location, and the Southern Pacific Railroad stop there, were referred to as Curtiss, Arizona in the 1920s.

== History ==
The company was incorporated in New Jersey in May 1920, with Articles of incorporation filed with the Arizona Corporation Commission on June 11, 1920. Charles E. Mills, President, Valley Bank, promoted the establishment of the company following WWI, enlisting the support of regional mining companies. Mills banded together a group of assistants with the necessary expertise to formulate planning. Following an independent review, the decision was made to move forward. This was a cooperative venture by several large mines in the Southwestern United States and Northwestern Mexico. Shares of the company were distributed, with 65% held by the mining companies and 35% by Mills and associates. Charles Mills served as president and managing director of the company until his death in January 1929. Charles E. Mills was a Harvard-educated mining engineer who moved to Bisbee, Arizona in 1888, where he worked for the Copper Queen Mine. Mills found great success in Arizona and was later the president of Arizona's Valley Bank. The dry climate of southern Arizona "was considered beneficial to the production of high-grade powder". Another benefit of the location was the hilly terrain that provided natural protection from explosions for the buildings used in production. The plant was also well located to serve regional consumers using existing railroads.

Construction of the plant began in March 1920, finishing in April 1922. The first shipment of dynamite occurred in April, 1922. Production was running at one million pounds of powder per month in 1923. The company was the only producer of these explosives in the Southwestern United States, producing 41 million pounds in 1956. It supplied explosives to mines in Arizona, New Mexico, northern Mexico, and the surrounding areas. The complex grew to around 140 buildings spread out around more than 700 acres (280 ha). Employment was in the hundreds, even though the Great Depression. The plant eventually became the country's largest single location for dynamite production.

In response to changes in mining technology, the product line expanded to include blasting agents based on ammonium nitrate and nitric acid in the 1940s. Ammonium nitrate was produced from anhydrous ammonia and air (the DuPont process) beginning in the 1950s. The original nitroglycerine-based products were phased out by 1983. In the 1990s the company was also producing detonating cord and ammonium nitrate solution for agricultural fertilizer. Fertilizer was sold to alfalfa, asparagus, cotton, citrus, lettuce, pecan, and wheat farmers in Arizona, California, New Mexico, and Mexico. However, Three-quarters of sales were to the mining industry. One of the original buildings at the site, a red brick structure known as the Powderhouse (built c. 1922), was still in use as of 2012. It contains boilers that produce steam, turning turbines to make the plant's electricity.

As of the mid-1980s, the company was owned jointly by Phelps Dodge, Magma Copper, Cyprus Copper, Southwest Energy, and the heirs of Charles Mills. Its land had expanded to 1,040 acres (420 ha).

== Railroad ==
The plant operated a narrow-gauge railroad to move material around the complex. The track length was 1.857 miles (2.989 km) in 1922. It was a three-foot gauge railway. Because of the risk of sparks causing an explosion in a dynamite manufacturing plant, mules initially pulled freight. The mules were later replaced with fireless locomotives manufactured by H.K. Porter Company. Apache Powder purchased seven of these locomotives, which could run for an hour on 400 °F (204 °C) steam after being charged at a boiler located a safe distance away from the working areas of the complex.

The company was connected to the national rail network by a 1.3 miles (2.1 km) long spur to the nearby El Paso and Southwestern Railroad.

Present location of six of the Porter 0-4-0 locomotives:

Builder #	Built	Location	Status
6827	July 1923	Benson Historical Society & Museum, Benson	Display
6828	July 1923	North Country & Pacific Creek Railroad, Fallbrook, California	Operational
6829	July 1923	Apache plant, St. David, Arizona	Display
7110	1924	Rail's End, Hurtsboro, Alabama	Restoration
7197	1930	Arizona State Railroad Museum, Williams, Arizona	Storage
		Salem, Ohio	Display

== Incidents ==
Apache Powder Company
- Superfund site
- Location within Arizona Location within the United States
- Location: St. David, Cochise, Arizona

Information
- CERCLIS ID: AZD008399263
- Contaminants: Arsenic, fluoride, nitrate, perchlorate, antimony, barium, beryllium, chromium, lead, manganese, 2,4-DNT, 2,6-DNT, vanadium pentoxide, paraffins, and TNT
- Responsible parties: Apache Nitrogen Products

Progress
- Proposed: June 24, 1988
- Listed: August 30, 1990
- Construction completed: September 26, 2008

In 1923, an explosion killed four workers and injured another. It was the first disaster since the plant opened. Five small buildings and a warehouse were destroyed.

In 1927, 3,000 lb (1,400 kg) of nitroglycerine exploded at the place, destroying several buildings. The explosion was heard for miles but caused no injuries. An operator noticed a problem and initiated a warning system; he and other workers were able to run to safety before the explosion.

In 2014, 52,000 lb of anhydrous ammonia slammed into multiple ANPI employees and one contractor. This incident would lead to them being fined $1,500,000 in 2018 by the EPA.

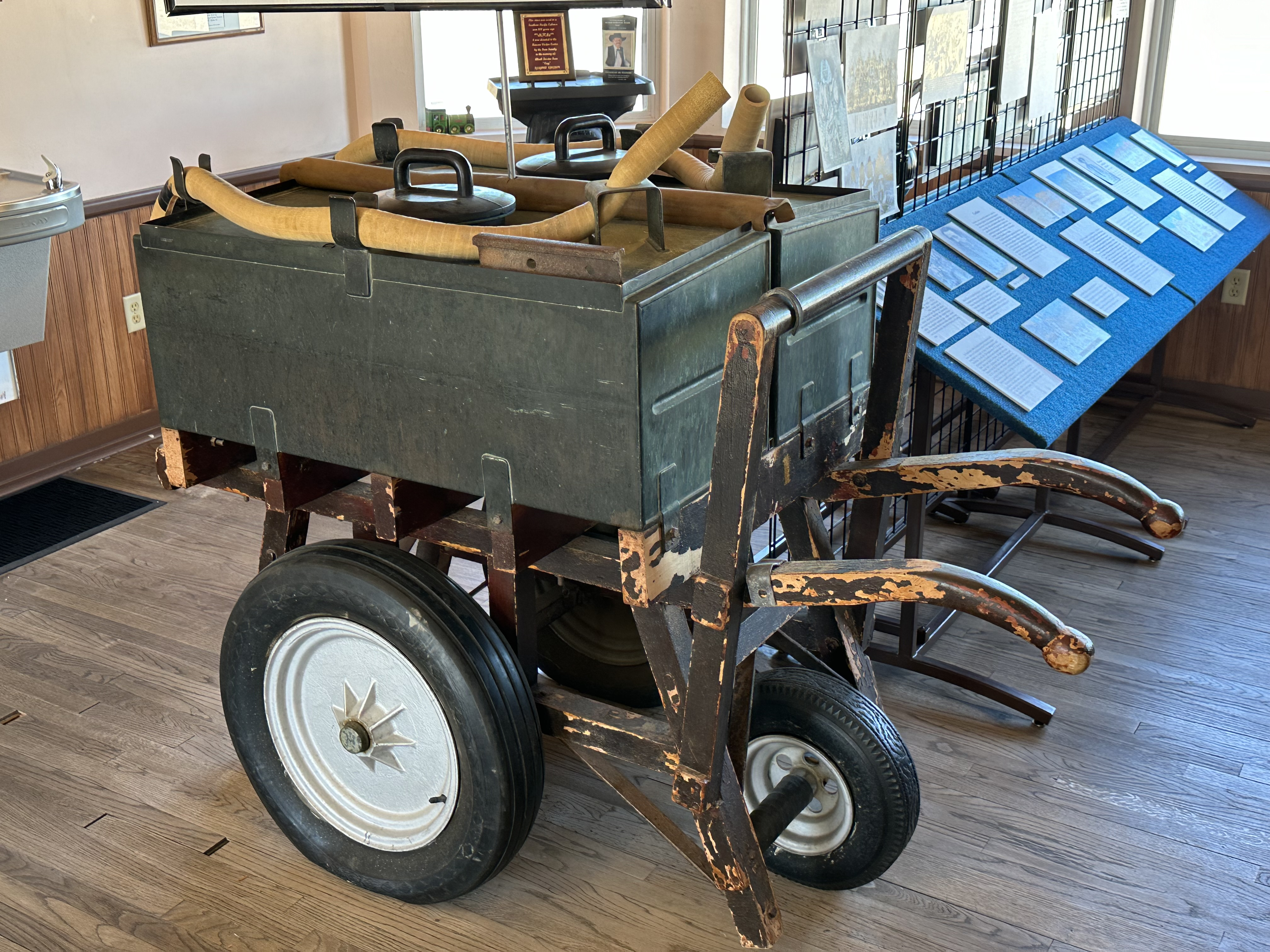
Apache Powder Company, Benson, Arizona used “Angel Buggies” to transport nitroglycerin. If you hit a bump, you became an angel immediately.

== Superfund site ==
The United States Environmental Protection Agency (EPA) has designated the site as a Superfund site due to pollution of hazardous material contaminations requiring a long-term response to clean up. The site includes approximately 9 sq mi (23 km^{2}) or 945 acres (382 ha) and contains groundwater contaminated with arsenic, fluoride, nitrate, and perchlorate. In addition, soil is contaminated with arsenic, antimony, barium, beryllium, chromium, lead, manganese, nitrate, 2,4-DNT, 2,6-DNT, lead, vanadium pentoxide, paraffins, and TNT from the commercial production of chemicals.

The EPA finalized a treatment plan in 1994 which called for contaminated water to be pumped out and evaporated and some treatment via wetlands and aquifer recharge. Contaminated soils were contained on-site, capped or excavated, and removed to off-site disposal. All construction work was completed in 2008, and the area was classified as "Ready for Reuse and Redevelopment" in 2010.

== Historic district ==
The company purchased land in 1925 to provide housing for company management from the Benson School District on West 6th Street in Benson, about 8 mi (13 km) north of the plant. Eight individual lots were sold to company officials, who had houses built (by unknown contractors). After a disagreement, the company purchased the lots back and then rented them to the employees at subsidized rates. Apache also built an "evacuation hospital" at 209 West 6th St. The company owned the properties for many decades, eventually selling them in the 1970s and 80s. A 1.75 acres (0.71 ha) parcel on the north side of the street was used as a park and legally transferred in the 1960s by the company to the City of Benson. The eight houses, the hospital building, and the park were designated as the Apache Powder Historic Residential District and listed on the National Register of Historic Places in 1994.
