= Apache Powder Historic Residential District =

Historic area in Benson, Arizona

- U.S. National Register of Historic Places
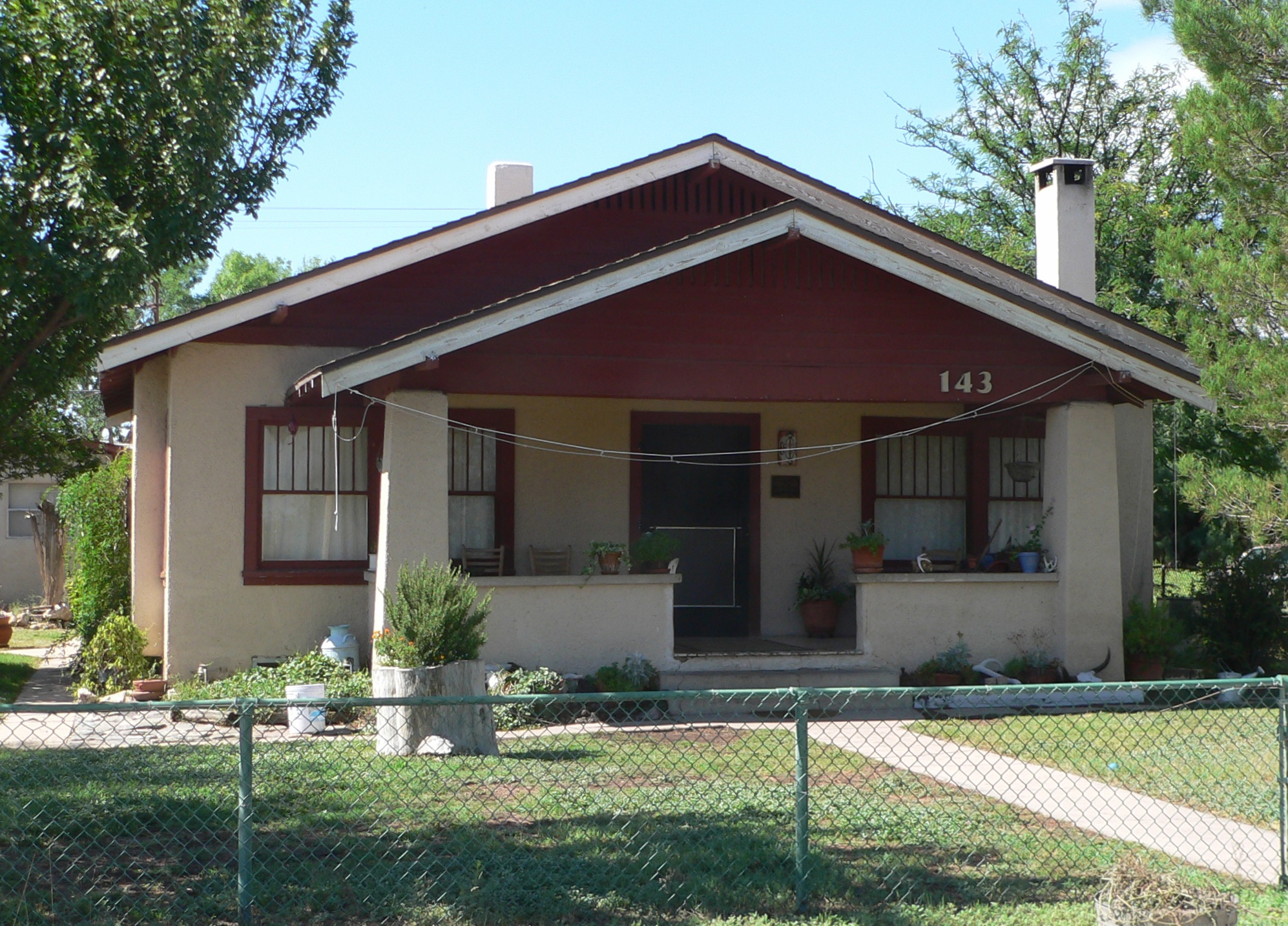
- 143 W. 6th St

- Location within Arizona Location within the United States
- Location: 100 & 200 Blocks, W. 6th St., Benson, Arizona
- Coordinates: 31.9667°N 110.2997°W
- Area: 4 acres (1.6 ha)
- Built: 1925
- Architectural style: Mission/Spanish Revival, Bungalow/Craftsman, Spanish Eclectic
- MPS: Benson MPS
- NRHP reference No.: 94000078
- Added to NRHP: March 11, 1994

Apache Nitrogen Products purchased land in 1925, to provide housing for company management, from the Benson School District on West 6th Street in Benson, about 8 mi (13 km) north of the plant. Eight individual lots were sold to company officials, who had houses built (by unknown contractors). After a disagreement, the company purchased the lots back and then rented them to the employees at subsidized rates. Apache also build an "evacuation hospital" at 209 West 6th St. The company owned the properties for many decades, eventually selling them in the 1970s and 80s. A 1.75 acres (0.71 ha) parcel on the north side of the street was used as a park and legally transferred in the 1960s by the company to the City of Benson.

The eight houses, the hospital building, and the park were designated as the Apache Powder Historic Residential District and listed on the National Register of Historic Places in 1994. Seven of the houses are in the Craftsman Bungalow architectural style, the dominant style of the district. The style was popular in the Benson area in the mid-1920s. All but one are stuccoed with wood-sided gable ends. One is entirely wood-sided. All have detached garages opening to an alley, hardwood flooring, and were built on redwood piers over a crawl space. One other house is Spanish Colonial Revival and Mission Revival style with stucco, stepped parapets, and an articulated porch, and originally served as an hospital for the company. The final building in the historic district is Spanish Eclectic with influences of Moorish, Byzantine, Gothic, and Renaissance architecture.

The district is considered "architecturally significant" for representing popular architectural styles at the time of Apache Powder's early history and association with the company, which is a significant part of Benson's history. The company brought important employment and economic stimulus to Benson.

== Contributing properties ==
All the houses were built c. 1925. The exact dates and builders are not known.

Address (on West 6th Street)	Style	Coordinates
143	Craftsman Bungalow	31.966374°N 110.299113°W
157	Craftsman Bungalow	31.966445°N 110.299299°W
161	Craftsman Bungalow	31.966460°N 110.299529°W
173	Craftsman Bungalow	31.966577°N 110.300016°W
189	Craftsman Bungalow	31.966615°N 110.300257°W
193	Craftsman Bungalow	31.966650°N 110.300457°W
209	Mission Revival Style	31.966736°N 110.300917°W
243	Spanish Eclectic Style	31.966785°N 110.301221°W
255	Craftsman Bungalow	31.966890°N 110.301503°W
Apache Park		31.967046°N 110.299655°W

== Map ==
Apache Powder Historic Residential District
Blue indicates house
Green indicates park
1 143 W 6th St
2 158 W 6th St
3 161 W 6th St
4 173 W 6th St
5 189 W 6th St
6 193 W 6th St
7 209 W 6th St
8 243 W 6th St
9 255 W 6th St
10 Apache Park
