= Benson High School (Arizona) =

Public school

Coordinates: 31.9658°N 110.2987°W

Location
- 360 S. Patagonia; Benson, Arizona 85602; United States

Information
- School type: Public high school
- School district: Benson Unified School District
- CEEB code: 030015
- Principal: Jeff Thompson
- Teaching staff: 27.57 (FTE)
- Grades: 9–12
- Enrollment: 414 (2023–2024)
- Student to teacher ratio: 15.02
- Colors: Red and blue
- Mascot: Bobcats
- Website: bensonhs.bensonusd.org/en-US

Benson High School is a high school in Benson, Arizona, United States. It is part of the Benson Unified School District.

== Notable alumni ==
- Chad Curtis, former MLB player (California Angels, Detroit Tigers, Los Angeles Dodgers, Cleveland Indians, New York Yankees, Texas Rangers)
- Mitch Hoopes, former NFL punter (Dallas Cowboys, San Diego Chargers, Detroit Lions)
