= Mitch Hoopes =

American football player (1953–2020)

No. 9, 12, 10, 17
- Position: Punter

Personal information
- Born: July 8, 1953; Bisbee, Arizona, U.S.
- Died: August 11, 2020 (aged 67); Vista, California, U.S.
- Listed height: 6 ft 1 in (1.85 m)
- Listed weight: 207 lb (94 kg)

Career information
- High school: Benson (AZ)
- College: Arizona
- NFL draft: 1975: 8th round, 200th overall pick

Career history
- Dallas Cowboys (1975); San Diego Chargers (1976); Houston Oilers (1976); St. Louis Cardinals (1977)*; Detroit Lions (1977); Philadelphia Eagles (1978); Boston Breakers (1983)
- * Offseason or practice squad member only

Career NFL statistics
- Punts: 123
- Punt yards: 4,760
- Longest punt: 57
- Stats at Pro Football Reference

Mitchell Kent Hoopes (July 8, 1953 – August 11, 2020) was an American professional football punter in the National Football League (NFL) for the Dallas Cowboys, San Diego Chargers, Houston Oilers, Detroit Lions and Philadelphia Eagles. He also was a member of the Boston Breakers in the United States Football League (USFL). He played college football at the University of Arizona.

== Early life ==
Hoopes attended Benson High School in Benson, Arizona, where he played as a halfback in Class B football. He received All-Conference, All-State and All-Star honors.

He also practiced basketball and baseball. As a senior, he contributed to the team winning the 1971 2A state basketball championship, with a 75-59 victory over Wickenburg High School.

== College career ==
Hoopes enrolled at Eastern Arizona Junior College. He transferred after his sophomore season to the University of Arizona to play as a defensive back and punter.

As a junior in 1973, he ended up concentrating on punting and was among college football's leaders with a 43.9 average, second in school history at the time. As a senior in 1974, he averaged 41.8 yards, with a long of 59.

== Professional career ==
=== Dallas Cowboys ===
Hoopes was selected by the Dallas Cowboys in the eighth round (200th overall) of the 1975 NFL draft, also known as the Dirty Dozen draft. That season he and Burton Lawless were the only rookies to earn starting jobs.

Facing 4th and 13 in the season opener against the Los Angeles Rams, he ran for a critical first down without informing head coach Tom Landry and helped the team achieve an 18–7 upset victory. He averaged 39.4 yards per punt and also completed one out of 3 passing attempts for 21 yards.

Playing in Super Bowl X with less than 12 minutes remaining in the fourth quarters, the Cowboys led 10-7 when Steelers backup running back Reggie Harrison broke through the middle of the offensive line and blocked a Hoopes' punt out of the end zone for a safety, cutting the lead to 10-9. The Steelers went on to win 21-17.

On August 3, 1976, with the arrival of Danny White who could play quarterback and punt, he was traded to the San Diego Chargers in exchange for an eight-round draft choice (#208-Al Cleveland) in the 1977 NFL draft.

=== San Diego Chargers ===
On November 9, 1976, Hoopes was released mid-season after averaging 38.8 yards per punt and running from a punt formation on a fourth and 17 against the Houston Oilers.

=== Houston Oilers ===
On November 12, 1976, he was signed by the Houston Oilers. On November 21, he was released after one game, for averaging only 31 yards a punt.

=== Saint Louis Cardinals ===
On May 18, 1977, Hoopes signed with the Saint Louis Cardinals. He was waived on September 9.

=== Detroit Lions ===
On September 10, 1977, he was claimed off waivers by the Detroit Lions. On September 22, he was released after one game, in which he had a punt blocked and another one returned for a touchdown.

=== Philadelphia Eagles ===
On June 7, 1978, he signed as a free agent with the Philadelphia Eagles. He became part of a revolving door at punter with Rick Engles, where he was signed three times during the season.

=== Boston Breakers ===
On November 20, 1982, he was signed by the Boston Breakers of the United States Football League. He tore his right hamstring during mini-camp. Even though he was able to recover, he later re-injured the hamstring. He announced his retirement after the 13th game of the 1983 season. He registered 23 punts for 866 yards (37.7-yard avg.) with a long of 60 yards.

== Personal life ==
Hoopes died on August 11, 2020, aged 67.
