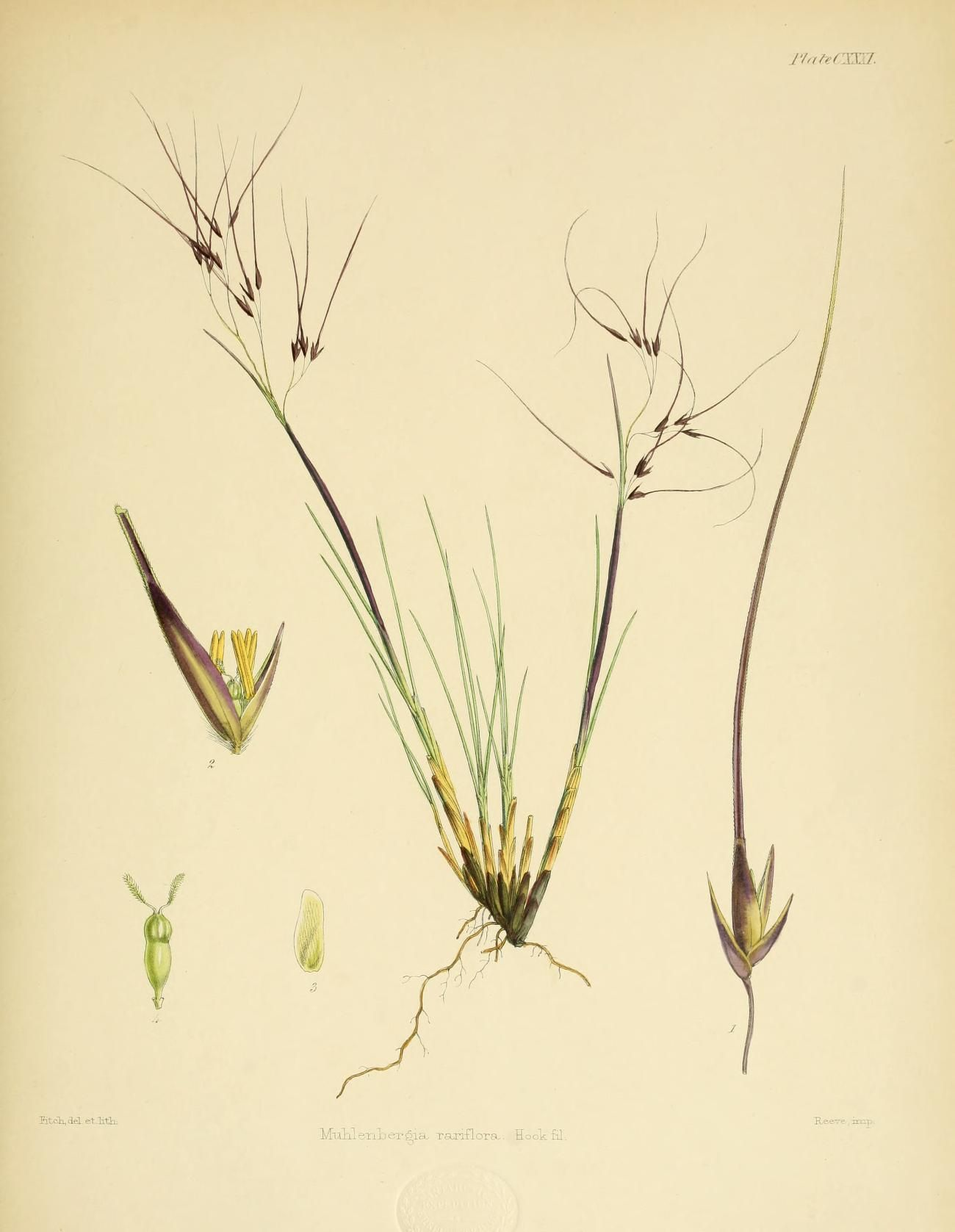
- Ortachne from Plate CXXXI of Hooker's Flora Anatarctica.

Scientific classification
- Kingdom: Plantae
- Clade: Tracheophytes
- Clade: Angiosperms
- Clade: Monocots
- Clade: Commelinids
- Order: Poales
- Family: Poaceae
- Subfamily: Pooideae
- Supertribe: Stipodae
- Tribe: Stipeae
- Genus: Ortachne; Nees ex Steud.

Type species
- Ortachne retorta (syn of O. rariflora) Nees ex Steud.

Synonyms
- Parodiella Reeder & C.Reeder 1968, illegitimate homonym not Speg. 1880 (a fungus in Pyrenomycetes)

= Ortachne =

Genus of grasses

Ortachne is a genus of Latin American plants in the grass family.

Species

- Ortachne breviseta Hitchc. - Chile, Argentina
- Ortachne rariflora (Hook.f.) Hughes - Chile, Argentina

formerly included

see Aristida

- Ortachne floridana - Aristida floridana
- Ortachne pilosa - Aristida jorullensis
- Ortachne scabra - Aristida ternipes
- Ortachne tenuis - Aristida ternipes
- Ortachne erectifolia (Swallen) Clayton - Lorenzochloa erectifolia
