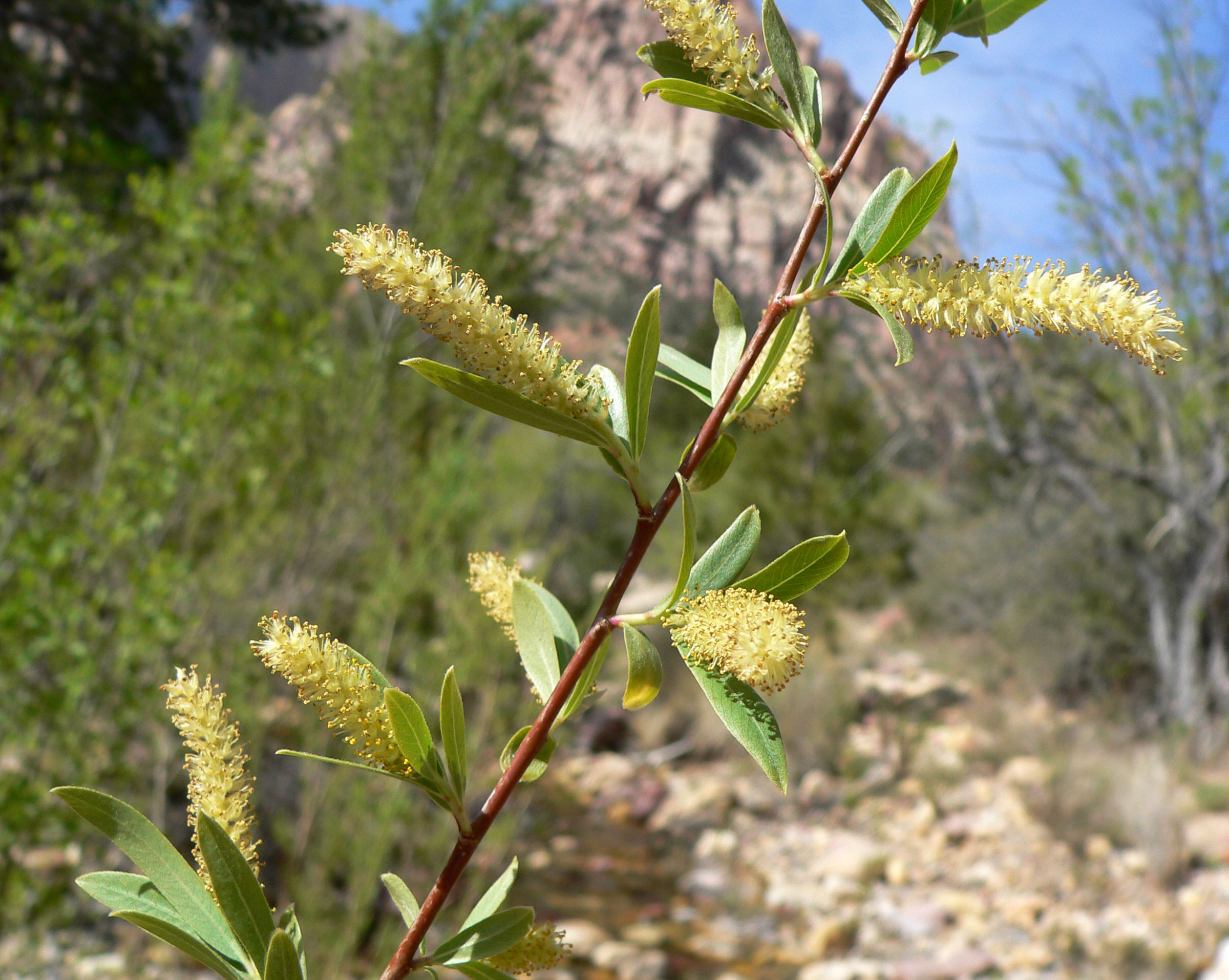

Conservation status
- Least Concern (IUCN 3.1)

- Secure (NatureServe)

Scientific classification
- Kingdom: Plantae
- Clade: Tracheophytes
- Clade: Angiosperms
- Clade: Eudicots
- Clade: Rosids
- Order: Malpighiales
- Family: Salicaceae
- Genus: Salix
- Species: S. gooddingii

Binomial name
- Salix gooddingii C.R.Ball

= Salix gooddingii =

Goodding's willow

Species of willow

Salix gooddingii is a species of willow known by the common name Goodding's willow, or Goodding's black willow. It was named for its collector, Leslie Newton Goodding.

Salix gooddingii is native to the southwestern United States and northern Mexico, where it grows in moist and wet habitat in many types of habitat from mountains to desert. It is a common riparian species. It is a tree growing to 3 to 30 m (9.8 to 98.4 ft) tall, with thick, furrowed, shreddy bark and many thin branches. The leaves are up to 13 cm long, generally lance-shaped, and finely serrated along the edges. The young leaves are coated in hairs. The inflorescence is a catkin of flowers up to 8 cm long. Sometimes it is considered a variant of Salix nigra.
