= Jack Speiden =

Arizona rancher & political activist (1900–1970)

John G. F. Speiden (March 4, 1900 − July 30, 1970) was an American stockbroker and ranch owner. Speiden fought in both World Wars, attended Yale and received a letter for football while playing on the hockey team, taught in China, worked on Wall Street, and bought a ranch. He ran for Congress for the 2nd District of Arizona in 1956 and 1958, but was defeated by Stewart Udall both times. Charlie Ohrel, who inherited most of the information about Speiden after his death, summed up Spieden's life with a humorous understatement: "He sure did give it a good shot". Speiden's ranch, the Jay Six Ranch, left a legacy of its own. The ranch played host to political figures like the young brothers Joseph & John F. Kennedy, and to senior statesman Barry Goldwater. The Kennedy brothers were sent out to the 40,000-acre (160 km^{2}) Jay Six Ranch in 1936 so that then 19-year-old Jack Kennedy could recuperate in the dry desert heat. It is reported that Speiden worked them both "very hard".

== Early life ==
At sixteen, Speiden joined an American volunteer ambulance unit headed for France in World War I. The United States entered the war a year later in 1917. Speiden, already in France, promptly joined the Marines and was returned to the States to train at Parris Island, South Carolina, then went back to France with the 2nd Division. When the war ended, Speiden entered Yale University. He played on the hockey team and received his letter as a fullback on the football team. After graduation, he still craved adventure, so he went to China with a Yale group. He taught English and economics at Changsha, deep in the interior of Hunan Province. He remained there for a year and spent the next year visiting Java, India, Malaya, Singapore, and Burma with fellow Yale alumni Ward Cheney and Stanley Woodward. During these travels Spieden and two of his American friends went hunting with the Nawab of Bhopal, possibly Hamidullah Khan. After returning to the United States in 1924, Speiden embarked on a successful Wall Street career. That career came to an end with the depression and Wall Street crash of 1929. After a trip to Honduras that same year, he caught a mysterious virus and was told to head west to the dry heat until his ailment was cured.

== Life in the West ==
Speiden recovered from the virus in twelve months. A chance meeting with Arthur Brisbane, the famous Hearst newspaper editor, in the spring of 1933 convinced him that he should make the American West his home. Brisbane told young Speiden that the country was rounding out the bottom of a business cycle, and the smart thing to do was to invest in land commodities. Speiden took the advice which subsequently proved sound.

His boyhood had been spent in the back country of New Jersey and he had learned to ride almost before he could walk. The cattle business seemed natural enough, but he thought it best to break in gradually. He acquired a small registered herd of 60 cows which, with the aid of one cowboy, he ran as part of the 76 Ranch in Cochise County. He concurrently embarked on course of self-education. Speiden read every available book on animal husbandry and was greatly helped by the excellent Animal Husbandry Department of the University of Arizona. After several years of study and practical experience, Speiden purchased what is now known as the Jay-Six Ranch near Benson, Arizona.

When Speiden took possession of the ranch it was carrying upwards of 1,000 head. The initial problem was to thin-out the herd and leave only registered stock, a slow and tedious process. He realized that it was important to bring in the best possible breeding stock, so he acquired bulls which were direct descendants of well-known strains such as Royal Domino 2nd, Royal Triumph and Anxiety 4th. The policy of weeding out the undesirables proved effective. At the ranch's peak, he had one of the most representative herds in the country. His cows were raised strictly for breeding purposes and not for the show ring, although they could have undoubtedly held their own against some of the blue ribbon winners of the day.

When Speiden took on John F. Kennedy and his brother Joe, he paid them a dollar a day. At that point Speiden had two other employees.

Speiden's passion for the improvement of breed carried into the quarter horse field, but on a much smaller scale. Again the emphasis was on quality. Although the venture was largely a hobby, it was obvious that a great amount of time went into selecting the best possible bloodlines. The results were gratifying as the Speiden colors were often first at the finish line.

The ranch became a popular destination for visitors. Included on the list was Barry Goldwater, "to find relaxation, or to toughen up".

In 1969, a gala dinner was held honoring Speiden's 25 years of contributions to Arizona.

Speiden was made a member of the National Cowboy Hall of Fame and for a time was the head of the Arizona Hereford Association.

== World War II ==
Speiden rose to the rank of Lt. Colonel while in the service during World War II. He also received the Bronze Star.

== Political involvement ==
Speiden not only ran twice as a Republican for Congress, but he was Pima County Republican Chairman in 1958, 1960 and 1961.

== Family ==
Speiden married Caroline Bayard Stevens. His daughter Leith was a child from his previous marriage to Rachel Hammond.

== Death ==
According to an obituary printed in the New York Times on August 2, 1970, John G. F. Speiden ("Arizona Ranchman") died the previous Thursday, July 30, 1970, at the age of 70. Cause of death was listed as drowning in the swimming pool at his home.

A July 31, 1970 article in the Tucson Daily Citizen remarked on the passing of Speiden, and carried a statement from Gov Jack Williams which read, in part, that "Mr. Speiden [was] a gallant gentleman and a courageous soldier and citizen, who has been lost to Arizona and the world". The newspaper noted that "survivors include Caroline Stevens Speiden, a Leith Klauber of Montreal, two sisters Countess Eleanor Davico of Milan, Italy and Dr. Katherine Caddick of London, England and a grand-son".

== See also ==
- Pima County, Arizona
- Joseph Kennedy Jr.
- John F. Kennedy
- Barry Goldwater

== General references ==
Much of the information provided by an article in Arizona Highways from October 1953, Charlie Ohrel, and Neil Simonson.
