= San Pedro Valley Observatory =

Observatory in Cochise County, Arizona

- Alternative names: Vega-Bray Observatory
- Location: Benson, Arizona (US)
- Coordinates: 31°56′27″N 110°15′27″W
- Altitude: 1,180 m (3,870 ft)
- Website: https://arizona-observatory.com/

San Pedro Valley Observatory, originally called Vega-Bray Observatory is an astronomical observatory located on a small hill overlooking the San Pedro River Valley, just east of Benson, Arizona (US). Founded in 1990 by Max Bray, an optician and Dr. Eduardo Vega, a pathologist, it is home to the Hoot-Vega Radio Telescope.

== See also ==
- List of astronomical observatories
