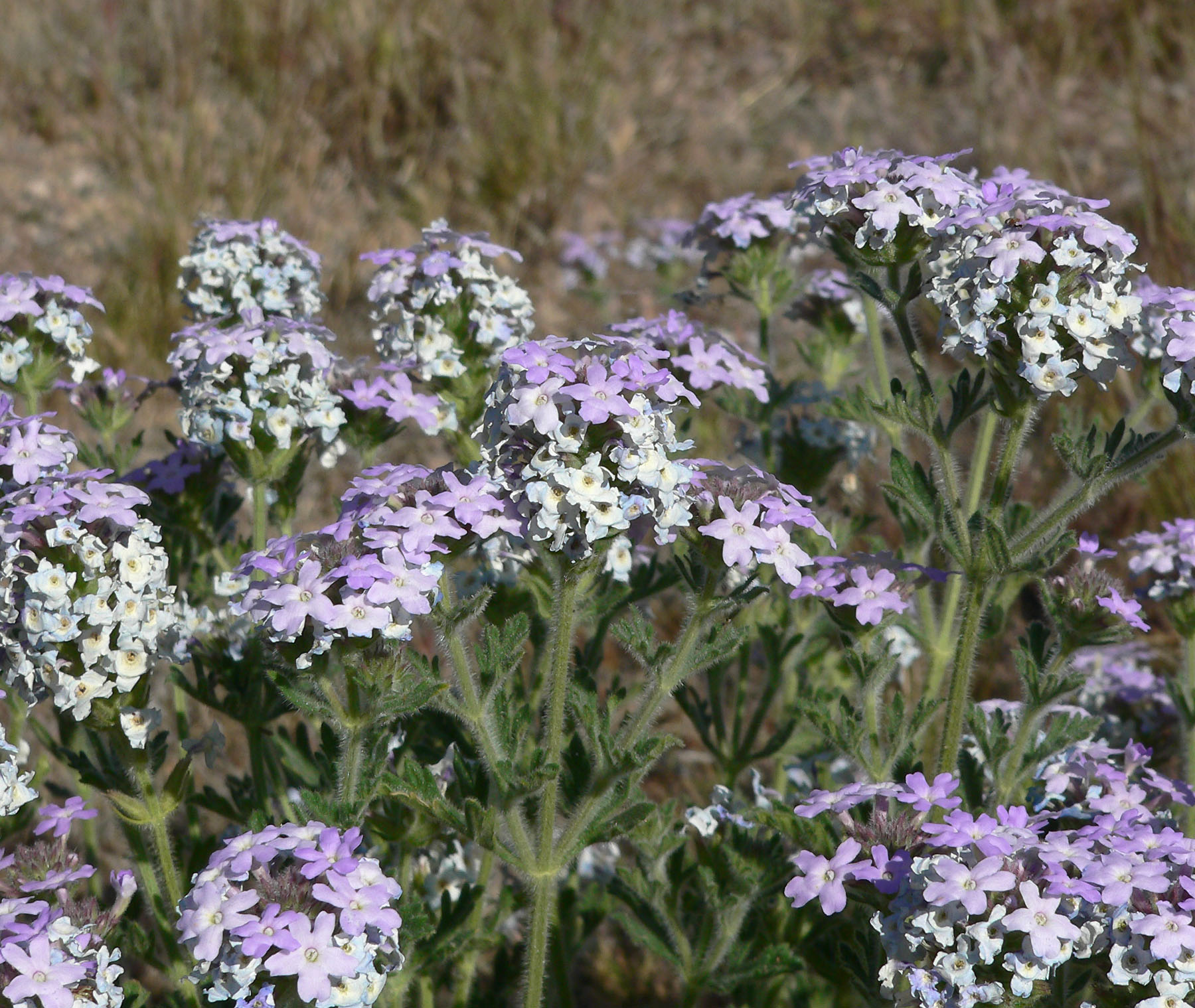

Scientific classification
- Kingdom: Plantae
- Clade: Tracheophytes
- Clade: Angiosperms
- Clade: Eudicots
- Clade: Asterids
- Order: Lamiales
- Family: Verbenaceae
- Genus: Verbena
- Species: V. gooddingii

Binomial name
- Verbena gooddingii Briq.

Synonyms
- List: Glandularia gooddingii (Briq.) Solbrig; Verbena bipinnatifida var. gooddingii (Briq.) Jeps.; Verbena arizonica Briq.; Verbena verna A.Nelson; Verbena verna var. fissa A.Nelson

= Verbena gooddingii =

Species of flowering plant

Verbena gooddingii, commonly known as southwestern mock vervain, is a species of flowering plant in the verbena family. It is native to the southwestern United States and northern Mexico, where it occurs in sandy and rocky desert habitat.

== Description ==
Verbena gooddingii is a perennial herb producing several hairy, decumbent to erect stems up to 45 centimeters long. The hairy leaves are generally divided at the base into a few lobes, which are edged with large teeth or small lobes. The plant blooms in large, dense, head-like spikes of many flowers. Each flower has a calyx of hairy sepals and a pale purple-blue corolla up to 1.4 centimeters long.
