= Allium gooddingii =

Conservation status
- Apparently Secure (NatureServe)

Scientific classification
- Kingdom: Plantae
- Clade: Tracheophytes
- Clade: Angiosperms
- Clade: Monocots
- Order: Asparagales
- Family: Amaryllidaceae
- Subfamily: Allioideae
- Genus: Allium
- Subgenus: A. subg. Amerallium
- Species: A. gooddingii

Binomial name
- Allium gooddingii Ownbey

Species of flowering plant

Allium gooddingii is a species of wild onion known by the common name Goodding's onion. It is native to Arizona and New Mexico in the United States.

This onion grows from a thick rhizome reminiscent of that of the iris. The rhizome has 1 to 3 bulbs on it. There are 3 to 6 leaves with flat blades up to 25 centimeters long. The inflorescence is borne atop an erect scape which is flattened and winged toward the top, growing to about 45 centimeters in height. The inflorescence is an umbel of 18 to 23 bell-shaped pink flowers each about a centimeter long. Blooming occurs in June through September. The plant has a strong onion scent.

This onion, one of 12 onion species in Arizona, occurs in the White, Santa Catalina, and Chuska Mountains there. It also occurs in the Mogollon Mountains and Sierra Blanca of New Mexico. It grows in Abies lasiocarpa/Vaccinium myrtillus plant communities at upper elevations and Abies concolor/Pseudotsuga menziesii/Poa pratensis communities in the lower. In some areas, it dominates the understory.

When available, this plant is favored by domestic and wild ungulates, which browse away the aboveground parts. Animals may eat so much plant material that they prevent all sexual reproduction within a population. This is one reason why it was considered to be rare and in decline. There now appear to be enough large, stable populations to be considered secure.
