= Benson Unified School District =

School district in Cochise County, Arizona

Address
- 360 South Patagonia Street Benson, Arizona, 85602; United States

District information
- Type: Public
- Grades: PreK–12
- NCES District ID: 0400212

Students and staff
- Students: 1,214
- Teachers: 68.57
- Staff: 105.63
- Student–teacher ratio: 17.7

Other information
- Website: www.bensonusd.org

The Benson Unified School District is the school district for the town of Benson, Arizona. It operates San Pedro Valley (alternative) and Benson high schools; a middle school; and a primary school.
