= John R. Reeder =

American botanist

John Raymond Reeder
- Born: July 29, 1914; Charlotte, Michigan
- Died: February 8, 2009 (aged 94)
- Education: Oregon State University; Harvard University
- Spouse: Charlotte Goodding Reeder (m. 1941)
- Scientific career
- Fields: Botany
- Workplaces: Yale University; University of Wyoming; University of Arizona
- Author abbrev. (botany): Reeder

John Raymond Reeder (July 29, 1914 – February 8, 2009) was an American agrostologist who was active in identifying the grasses of New Guinea, Wyoming, and Arizona all while on duty for the US military during the second world war. The standard author abbreviation Reeder is used to indicate this person as the author when citing a botanical name.

== Biography ==
Reeder was born on a farm in Charlotte, Michigan on July 29, 1914. He went on to attend Oregon State University and met Charlotte Olive Goodding, whom he married in 1941. Reeder joined the military upon the involvement of America in World War II. He was stationed in a malaria unit in New Guinea. While on duty, he collected grasses for curation back in America.

Upon his return from the war, Reeder was accepted into a Ph.D. program at Harvard University. He took classes while also working at the Arnold Arboretum, and eventually earned his doctorate. In 1947, he accepted a position at Yale University in the forestry department. He taught courses on dendrology, agrostology, and plant taxonomy. He also served as Curator of the Herbarium at the Peabody Museum of Natural History.

In 1968, Reeder and his wife left Connecticut after his retirement from Yale. They continued their research at the Rocky Mountain Herbarium of the University of Wyoming. The couple relocated to Tucson, Arizona to research at the University of Arizona Herbarium in 1983.

After a severe car accident, the two decided to retire.

== Legacy ==
The genus Reederochloa and species Muhlenbergia reederorum were named in honor of the Reeders by Thomas Robert Soderstrom.
