= Charlotte Goodding Reeder =

American botanist

- Reeder in 2003
- Born: July 26, 1916; Flagstaff, Arizona
- Died: October 23, 2009 (aged 93)
- Other name: Charlotte Olive Goodding
- Education: University of Wyoming
- Spouse: John R. Reeder (m. 1941; died 2009)
- Scientific career
- Fields: Botany
- Workplaces: Smithsonian Institution; University of Arizona
- Author abbrev. (botany): C.Reeder, C.O.Goodd.

Charlotte Goodding Reeder (born Charlotte Olive Goodding; July 26, 1916 – October 23, 2009) was an American agrostologist who was active in identifying the flora of Arizona. The standard author abbreviation C.Reeder is used to indicate this person as the author when citing a botanical name. The abbreviation C.O.Goodd. has also been used.

== Biography ==
Reeder was born on July 26, 1916, in Flagstaff, Arizona. She was the daughter of accomplished botanist Leslie Newton Goodding. Picking up from her father, she began to help him identify species in Arizona. She attended the University of Wyoming, earning her M.A. in 1939 for her thesis on Muhlenbergia. She then took classes at Oregon State University where she met John R. Reeder. The two married in 1941. With her husband conscripted in the military during World War II, Reeder went to work at the Smithsonian Institution under Agnes Chase.

Upon John's return from the war, he took a post at Yale University and the couple moved to Connecticut. Reeder continued her studies on Muhlenbergia, titling herself "Rogue Botanist". The Reeders moved to Wyoming in 1968, where they collaborated on work at the Rocky Mountain Herbarium of the University of Wyoming. In 1976, they moved to Tucson, Arizona, to research at the University of Arizona Herbarium.

After a severe car accident, the two decided to retire.

== Legacy ==
The genus Reederochloa and species Muhlenbergia reederorum were named in honor of the Reeders by Thomas Robert Soderstrom.
