= Benson, Arizona =

City in Cochise County, Arizona

- City
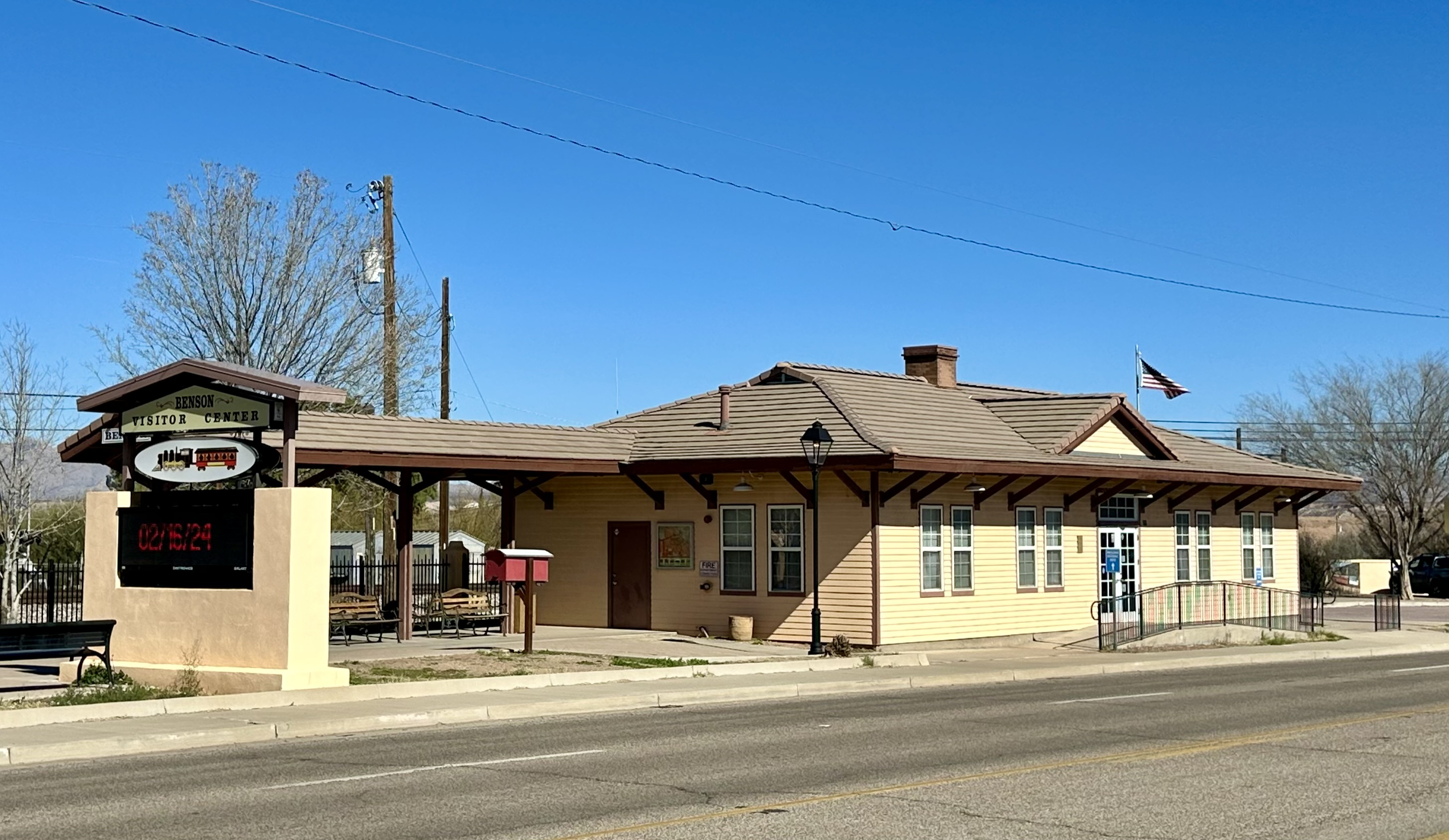
- Benson Visitor Center, replica of former Benson Southern Pacific Railroad Station (2024)

- Flag

- Location within Cochise County and Arizona

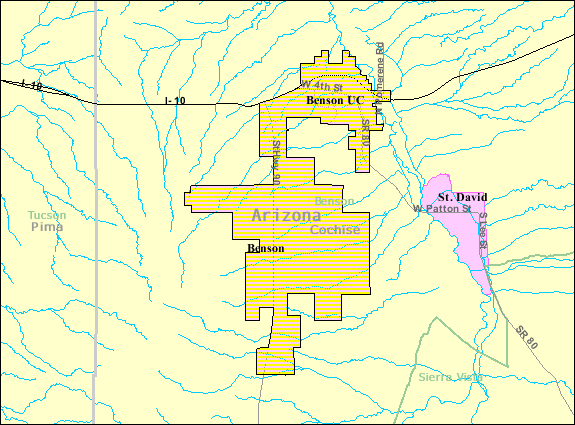
- Detailed map of Benson
- Coordinates: 31°57′20″N 110°18′24″W
- Country: United States
- State: Arizona
- County: Cochise
- Founded: 1880

Government
  - Type: Council-manager
  - Mayor: Joe A. Konrad
  - City Manager: Greg Volker

Area
  - Total: 41.69 sq mi (107.97 km^{2})
  - Land: 41.64 sq mi (107.84 km^{2})
  - Water: 0.050 sq mi (0.13 km^{2})
- Elevation: 4,229 ft (1,289 m)

Population (2020)
  - Total: 5,355
  - Density: 128.6/sq mi (49.66/km^{2})
- Time zone: UTC-7 (MST (no daylight saving time))
- ZIP code: 85602
- Area code: 520
- FIPS code: 04-05770
- GNIS ID: 2409835
- Website: bensonaz.gov

Benson is a city in Cochise County, Arizona, United States. As of the 2020 census, the population of the city was 5,355. It was founded as a rail terminal for the area, and is located approximately 45 miles (72 km) east-southeast of the city of Tucson.

== History ==
The city was founded in 1880 when the Southern Pacific Railroad came through. It was named after Judge William S. Benson, a friend of Charles Crocker, president of the Southern Pacific. The railroad, coming overland from California, chose the Benson site to cross the San Pedro River. Benson then served as a rail junction point to obtain ore and refined metal by wagon, in turn shipping rail freight back to the mines at Tombstone, Fairbank, Contention City and Bisbee. For example, the railhead in Benson was about 25 miles (40 km) from Tombstone, and was the closest rail connection to it until 1882, when a feeder line was laid from Benson to Contention City.

The railhead in Benson was founded about a mile from a traditional crossing of the upper San Pedro River (known also as the Middle Crossing), used by the Southern Emigrant Trail and San Antonio-San Diego Mail Line. It was the site of the San Pedro Station of the Butterfield Overland Mail and a wagon depot, the San Pedro River Station, run since 1871 by William Ohnesorgen. In 1878 he had erected a toll bridge over which mining supplies were transported to the new mining camps such as Fairbank and Tombstone. Two years later this bridge marked the location of the railroad bridge that became the terminal site of Benson.

Apache Nitrogen Products (originally Apache Powder Company) was formed in the 1920s. It was located just outside Benson and was a major employer. Apache Park and nine nearby houses on West 6th Street in Benson, built to house company management, were listed on the National Register of Historic Places in 1994 as the Apache Powder Historic Residential District.

The city today is perhaps best known as the gateway to Kartchner Caverns State Park. It is also home to the acclaimed Singing Wind Bookshop, which specializes in books about the Southwest.

== Geography ==
According to the United States Census Bureau, Benson has a total area of 41.5 square miles (107.4 km^{2}), of which 0.04 square miles (0.1 km^{2}), or 0.12%, is water.

=== Climate ===
Similar to other desert plains areas of Arizona, Benson receives little rainfall and is relatively hot. Some snow occasionally falls in the winter. There is a high degree of diurnal temperature variation, especially in transitional months such as October.

Climate data for Benson, Arizona, 1991–2020 normals, extremes 1894–present
Month	Jan	Feb	Mar	Apr	May	Jun	Jul	Aug	Sep	Oct	Nov	Dec	Year
Record high °F (°C)	85 (29)	90 (32)	95 (35)	102 (39)	108 (42)	116 (47)	112 (44)	113 (45)	108 (42)	103 (39)	93 (34)	84 (29)	116 (47)
Mean maximum °F (°C)	75.4 (24.1)	79.0 (26.1)	85.6 (29.8)	91.8 (33.2)	99.2 (37.3)	105.4 (40.8)	105.6 (40.9)	102.4 (39.1)	99.2 (37.3)	93.9 (34.4)	83.1 (28.4)	76.6 (24.8)	107.0 (41.7)
Mean daily maximum °F (°C)	64.7 (18.2)	68.0 (20.0)	74.4 (23.6)	81.4 (27.4)	89.7 (32.1)	99.0 (37.2)	97.5 (36.4)	95.2 (35.1)	92.0 (33.3)	84.2 (29.0)	73.3 (22.9)	64.4 (18.0)	82.0 (27.8)
Daily mean °F (°C)	45.9 (7.7)	49.1 (9.5)	54.8 (12.7)	61.2 (16.2)	69.2 (20.7)	78.3 (25.7)	81.7 (27.6)	80.0 (26.7)	75.1 (23.9)	64.6 (18.1)	53.5 (11.9)	45.7 (7.6)	63.3 (17.4)
Mean daily minimum °F (°C)	27.1 (−2.7)	30.1 (−1.1)	35.3 (1.8)	41.0 (5.0)	48.7 (9.3)	57.7 (14.3)	65.9 (18.8)	64.8 (18.2)	58.1 (14.5)	45.1 (7.3)	33.6 (0.9)	26.9 (−2.8)	44.5 (7.0)
Mean minimum °F (°C)	16.8 (−8.4)	19.4 (−7.0)	23.5 (−4.7)	29.9 (−1.2)	38.0 (3.3)	47.1 (8.4)	56.8 (13.8)	58.1 (14.5)	48.4 (9.1)	31.9 (−0.1)	21.1 (−6.1)	16.3 (−8.7)	13.4 (−10.3)
Record low °F (°C)	5 (−15)	4 (−16)	10 (−12)	18 (−8)	22 (−6)	35 (2)	46 (8)	42 (6)	35 (2)	15 (−9)	9 (−13)	−7 (−22)	−7 (−22)
Average precipitation inches (mm)	0.80 (20)	0.63 (16)	0.57 (14)	0.19 (4.8)	0.17 (4.3)	0.29 (7.4)	2.65 (67)	2.79 (71)	1.64 (42)	0.65 (17)	0.51 (13)	0.88 (22)	11.77 (298.5)
Average snowfall inches (cm)	0.2 (0.51)	0.0 (0.0)	0.0 (0.0)	0.0 (0.0)	0.0 (0.0)	0.0 (0.0)	0.0 (0.0)	0.0 (0.0)	0.0 (0.0)	0.0 (0.0)	0.0 (0.0)	0.0 (0.0)	0.2 (0.51)
Average precipitation days (≥ 0.01 in)	3.8	4.3	2.8	1.6	1.6	2.4	10.2	11.3	5.3	2.7	2.7	3.9	52.6
Average snowy days (≥ 0.1 in)	0.1	0.0	0.0	0.0	0.0	0.0	0.0	0.0	0.0	0.0	0.0	0.1	0.2
Source 1: NOAA
Source 2: National Weather Service

== Demographics ==
Historical population
Census	Pop.	Note	%±
1890	348		—
1910	1,035		—
1920	825		−20.3%
1930	925		12.1%
1940	962		4.0%
1950	1,440		49.7%
1960	2,494		73.2%
1970	2,839		13.8%
1980	4,190		47.6%
1990	3,824		−8.7%
2000	4,711		23.2%
2010	5,105		8.4%
2020	5,355		4.9%
U.S. Decennial Census

Benson first appeared on the 1890 U.S. Census as an unincorporated village. It did not appear on the 1900 census. It reappeared again in 1910. It did not return separately (as a village) in 1920, but the population for the Benson Precinct of Cochise County (825) was substituted (which included the village of Benson and adjacent area). It formally incorporated as a town in 1924 and has returned on every census since 1930. On March 26, 1985, voters approved a resolution upgrading Benson to city status.

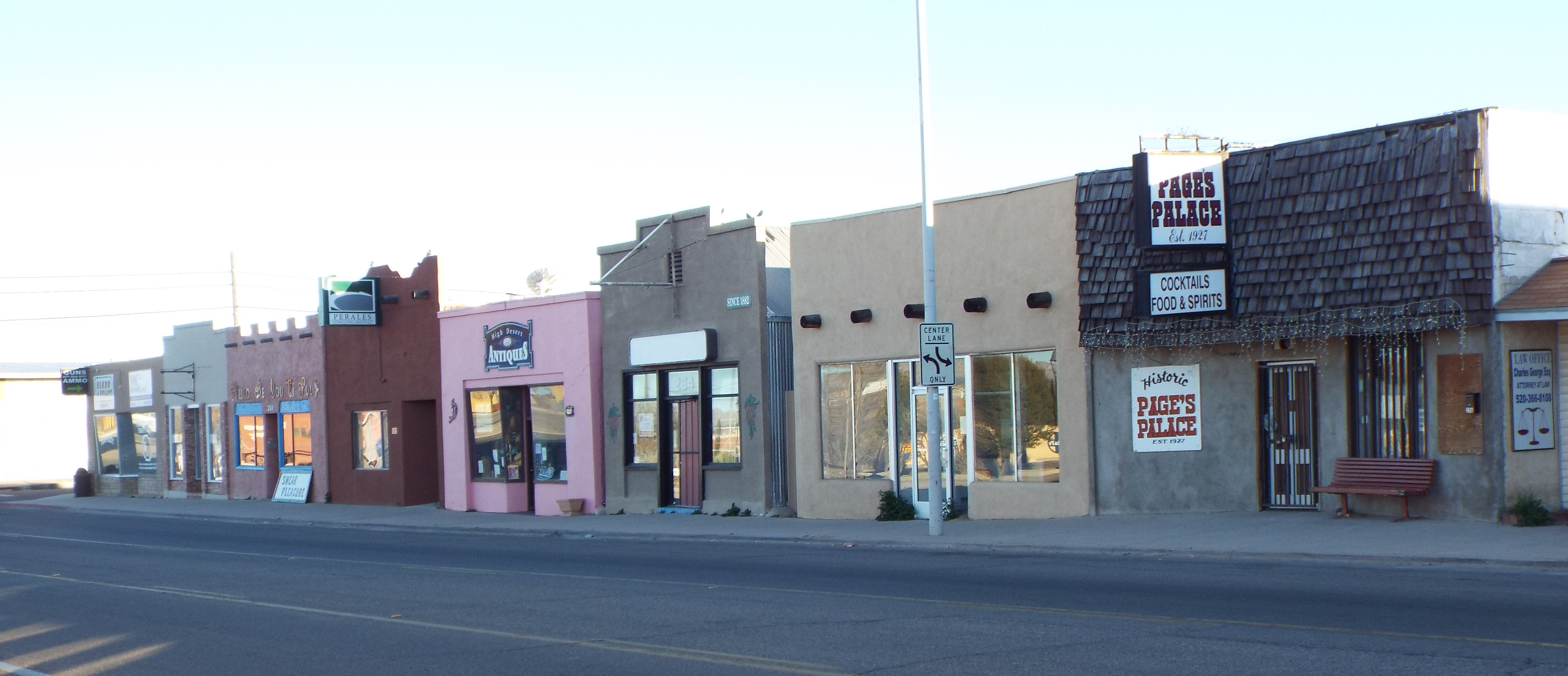
Benson-Main Street

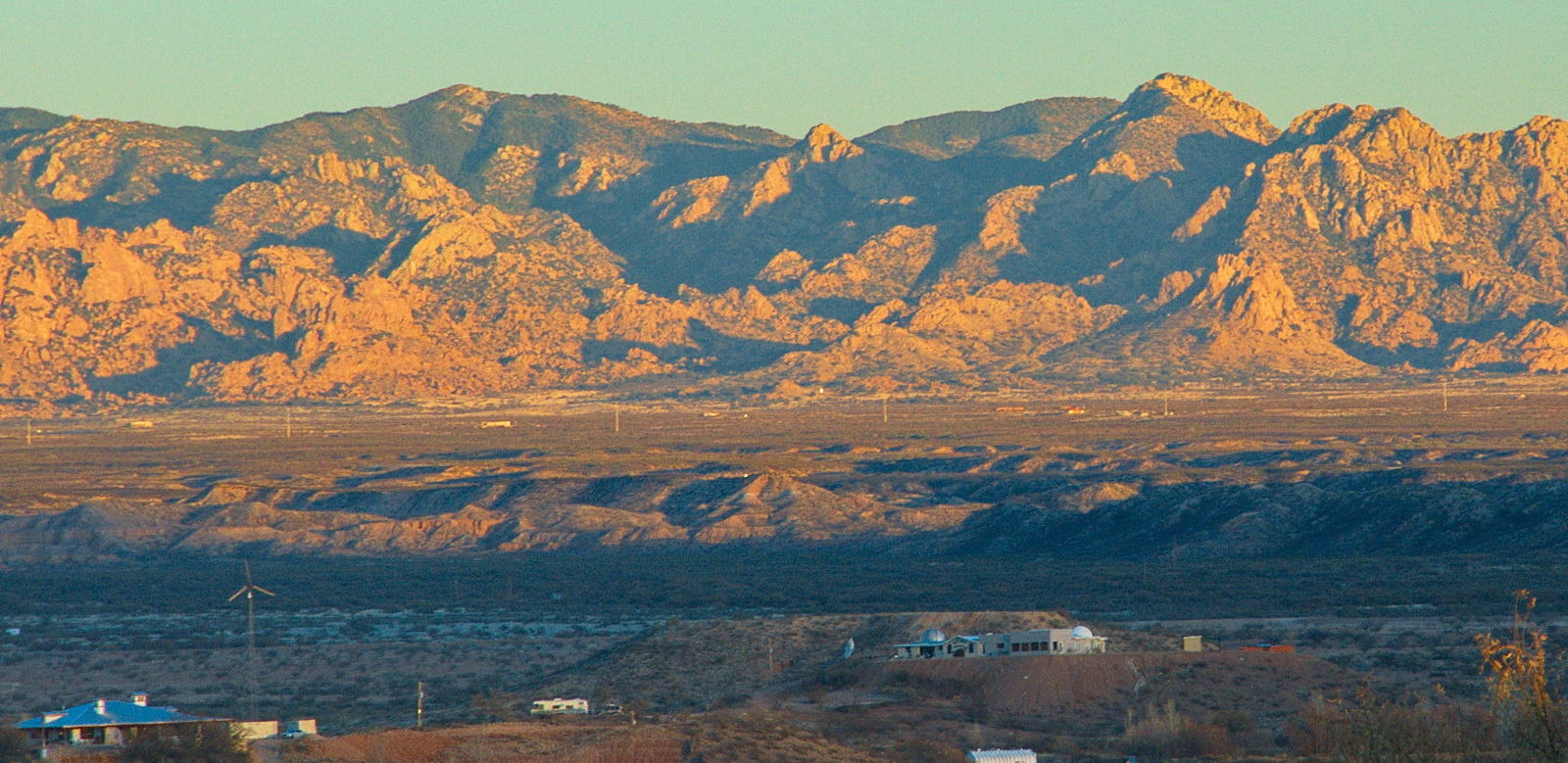
Benson sunset

=== 2020 census ===
As of the 2020 census, Benson had a population of 5,355. The median age was 56.4 years. 17.2% of residents were under the age of 18 and 37.4% of residents were 65 years of age or older. For every 100 females there were 95.9 males, and for every 100 females age 18 and over there were 96.3 males age 18 and over.

71.5% of residents lived in urban areas, while 28.5% lived in rural areas.

There were 2,579 households in Benson, of which 20.2% had children under the age of 18 living in them. Of all households, 42.5% were married-couple households, 23.1% were households with a male householder and no spouse or partner present, and 28.3% were households with a female householder and no spouse or partner present. About 36.7% of all households were made up of individuals and 22.6% had someone living alone who was 65 years of age or older.

There were 3,114 housing units, of which 17.2% were vacant. The homeowner vacancy rate was 2.9% and the rental vacancy rate was 11.2%.

Racial composition as of the 2020 census
Race	Number	Percent
White	4,244	79.3%
Black or African American	63	1.2%
American Indian and Alaska Native	85	1.6%
Asian	46	0.9%
Native Hawaiian and Other Pacific Islander	21	0.4%
Some other race	266	5.0%
Two or more races	630	11.8%
Hispanic or Latino (of any race)	969	18.1%

=== 2000 census ===
As of the census of 2000, there were 4,711 people, 2,084 households, and 1,346 families residing in the city. The population density was 131.9 inhabitants per square mile (50.9/km^{2}). There were 2,822 housing units at an average density of 79.0 per square mile (30.5/km^{2}). The racial makeup of the city was 89.3% White or European American, 1.3% Native American, 0.7% Black or African American, 0.5% Asian, 0.1% Pacific Islander, 5.7% from other races, and 2.4% from two or more races. Hispanic or Latino people of any race were 19.9% of the population.

There were 2,084 households, out of which 18.9% had children under the age of 18 living with them, 51.5% were married couples living together, 9.2% had a female householder with no husband present, and 35.4% were non-families. 30.0% of all households were made up of individuals, and 17.4% had someone living alone who was 65 years of age or older. The average household size was 2.22 and the average family size was 2.72.

In the city, the population was 19.5% under the age of 18, 6.7% from 18 to 24, 18.0% from 25 to 44, 26.5% from 45 to 64, and 29.3% who were 65 years of age or older. The median age was 50 years. For every 100 females, there were 95.7 males. For every 100 females age 18 and over, there were 91.9 males.

The median income for a household in the city was $28,289, and the median income for a family was $36,364. Males had a median income of $34,013 versus $18,964 for females. The per capita income for the city was $17,315. About 6.2% of families and 13.7% of the population were below the poverty line, including 26.1% of those under age 18 and 9.9% of those age 65 or over.

== Education ==
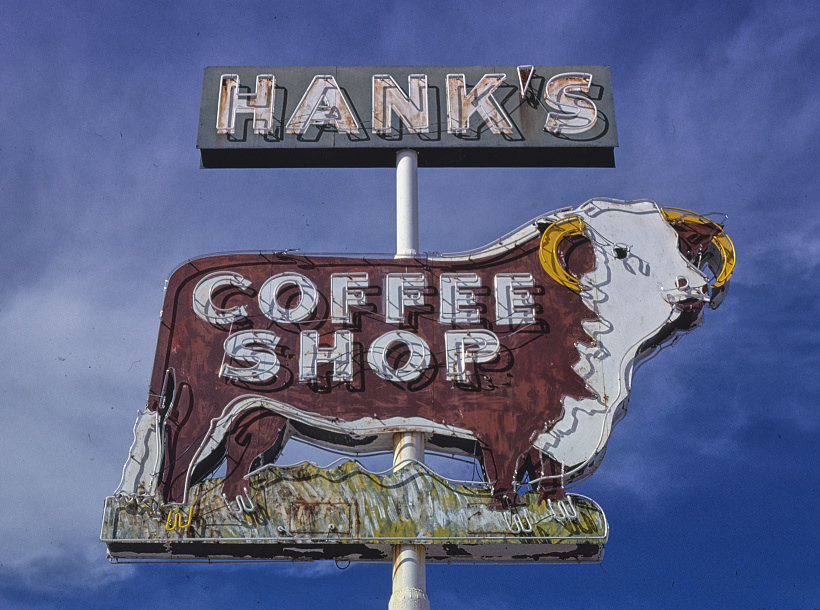
Hank's Coffee Shop sign, 4th Street, Benson, 1979

The World University was located in Benson.

The Benson Unified School District is a K-12 public school serving the Benson area. Their mascot is the Benson Bobcat.

Cochise College has a branch located on Route 90.

== Infrastructure ==
=== Transportation ===
Benson Airport is located 5 miles (8 km) northwest of the city center.

Interstate 10 serves the city with four exits; the highway leads northwest 45 miles (72 km) to Tucson and northeast 35 miles (56 km) to Willcox. Arizona State Route 80 leads southeast 24 miles (39 km) to Tombstone, and Arizona State Route 90 leads south 32 miles (51 km) to Sierra Vista.

Amtrak provides passenger rail service at 105 E. 4th Street, where it serves as a stop for the Sunset Limited and Texas Eagle lines (as of 2024). Freight railroads serving Benson are the Union Pacific Railroad and the San Pedro and Southwestern Railroad. Benson is also served by Greyhound between Phoenix and El Paso or Sierra Vista.

Benson Area Transit (BAT) is a bus service that covers Benson, St. David, Pomerene and Mescal.

== Notable people ==
- Baxter Black, cowboy, poet, philosopher and former large-animal veterinarian
- Lupe Diaz, politician, Arizona House of Representatives (2021–present)
- Chad Curtis, former professional baseball player convicted of sexual assault
- Nick Gomez, actor
- Mitch Hoopes, former NFL punter
- Harry Partch, composer, music theorist, and creator of musical instruments
- Nick Ramus, actor
- Jack Speiden, stockbroker and ranch owner
- Chuck Stevenson, racecar driver

== In popular culture ==
- This city was one of the filming locations for Paramount's 1994 film Pontiac Moon.
- "Benson, Arizona" is the theme song to the 1974 movie Dark Star. Dark Star Road in Benson is named in honor of the film.
- The Spiritual Conference for Radical Fairies was held August 31–2 September 2, 1979, at the Sri Ram Ashram in Benson, the foundational event that began the Radical Faeries community.
- Rage, with George C. Scott, was filmed at the then-new Benson Hospital.
- This city was one of the filming locations for the 2005 film Miracle at Sage Creek.

== See also ==
- San Pedro Valley Observatory
