= List of high schools in Arizona =

This is a list of high schools in the state of Arizona.

== Apache County ==
- Ganado High School, Ganado
- Many Farms High School, Many Farms
- Red Mesa High School, Teec Nos Pos
- Red Valley/Cove High School, Red Valley
- Rock Point Community School, Rock Point
- Round Valley High School, Eagar
- St. Michael Indian School, St. Michaels
- Valley High School, Sanders
- Window Rock High School, Fort Defiance

=== Chinle ===
- Chinle High School
- Rough Rock Community School

=== St. Johns ===
- New Visions Academy
- St. Johns High School

== Cochise County ==
- Bisbee High School, Bisbee
- Bowie High School, Bowie
- San Simon School, San Simon
- St. David High School, St. David
- Tombstone High School, Tombstone
- Valley Union High School, Elfrida
- Willcox High School, Willcox

=== Benson ===
- Benson High School
- Grace Christian Academy

=== Douglas ===
- Center for Academic Success-Douglas
- Douglas High School

=== Sierra Vista ===
- Berean Academy
- Buena High School
- Center for Academic Success-Sierra Vista
- Veritas Christian Community School

== Coconino County ==
- Fredonia High School, Fredonia
- Grand Canyon High School, Grand Canyon
- Williams High School, Williams

=== Flagstaff ===
- Basis Schools Flagstaff
- Coconino High School
- Flagstaff High School
- Flagstaff Christian School
- Northland Preparatory Academy
- Ponderosa High School

=== Page ===
- Page High School
- Tse'Yaato' High School

=== Tuba City ===
- Greyhills Academy High School
- Tuba City High School

== Gila County ==
- Hayden High School, Winkelman
- Miami High School, Miami
- San Carlos High School, San Carlos
- Young Public School, Young

=== Globe ===
- Globe High School
- Liberty High School

=== Payson ===
- New Visions Academy
- Payson High School

== Graham County ==
- Fort Thomas High School, Fort Thomas
- Pima High School, Pima
- Thatcher High School, Thatcher

=== Safford ===
- Mount Graham High School
- Safford High School

== Greenlee County ==
- Duncan High School, Duncan
- Morenci Junior/Senior High School, Morenci

== La Paz County ==
- Parker High School, Parker
- Salome High School, Salome

== Maricopa County ==
- Arizona Agribusiness and Equine Center, multiple locations
- Basis Schools, multiple locations
- Cactus Shadows High School, Cave Creek
- Canyon View High School, Waddell
- Dysart High School, El Mirage
- e-Institute Charter High School, multiple locations
- Fountain Hills High School, Fountain Hills
- Gila Bend High School, Gila Bend
- Intelli-School, multiple locations
- Leading Edge Academy, multiple locations
- Phoenix Country Day School, Paradise Valley
- Tonopah Valley High School, Tonopah

=== Anthem ===
- Anthem Preparatory Academy
- Boulder Creek High School

=== Avondale ===
- Agua Fria High School
- Estrella High School
- La Joya Community High School
- St. John Paul II Catholic High School
- West Point High School
- Westview High School

=== Buckeye ===
- Buckeye Union High School
- The Odyssey Institute for Advanced and International Studies
- Skyview High School
- Verrado High School
- Youngker High School

=== Chandler ===
- Arizona College Preparatory
- AZ Compass Prep School
- Basha High School
- Basis Schools
- Chandler High School
- Chandler Preparatory Academy
- El Dorado High School
- Hamilton High School
- Lincoln Preparatory Academy
- Paragon Science Academy
- Primavera Online High School
- Seton Catholic Preparatory High School
- Tri-City Christian Academy
- Valley Christian High School

=== Gilbert ===
- American Leadership Academy Gilbert North
- Apollo High School
- Campo Verde High School
- Desert Hills High School
- Eduprize Gilbert
- Gilbert Christian High School
- Gilbert Classical Academy
- Gilbert Global Academy
- Gilbert High School
- Highland High School
- Higley High School
- Learning Foundation and Performing Arts School-Gilbert Campus
- Mesquite High School
- Perry High School
- San Tan Charter School
- Williams Field High School

=== Glendale ===
- Arrowhead Christian Academy
- Cactus High School
- Copper Canyon High School
- Deer Valley High School
- Desert Heights Preparatory Academy]
- Dream City Christian School
- Glendale High School
- Independence High School
- Ironwood High School
- Mountain Ridge High School
- Raymond S. Kellis High School
- Western Maricopa Education Center

=== Goodyear ===
- Desert Edge High School
- Estrella Foothills High School
- Goodyear High School
- Millennium High School
- Trivium Prep Academy

=== Laveen ===
- Betty H. Fairfax High School
- César Chávez High School
- Country Gardens Charter School
- Heritage Academy (Laveen)

=== Mesa ===
- Academy With Community Partners
- Arete Preparatory Academy
- Basis Schools Mesa
- Canyon Valley School
- Desert Ridge High School
- Dobson High School
- East Valley Academy
- East Valley High School
- East Valley Institute of Technology
- Eastmark High School
- Faith Christian School
- Heritage Academy
- Mesa High School
- Mountain View High School
- Red Mountain High School
- Redeemer Christian School
- Riverview High School
- Sequoia Charter School
- Skyline High School
- Sun Valley High School
- Superstition High School
- Westwood High School

=== Peoria ===
- Centennial High School
- Glendale Preparatory Academy
- Liberty High School
- Peoria Accelerated High School
- Peoria High School
- Sunrise Mountain High School

=== Phoenix ===
==== Phoenix Union High School District ====
- Alhambra High School
- Bioscience High School
- Bostrom High School
- Browne High School
- Camelback High School
- Central High School
- Desiderata Program
- Franklin Police and Fire High School
- Hayden High School
- Linda Abril Educational Academy
- Maryvale High School
- Metro Tech High School
- North High School
- South Mountain High School

==== Other Public Schools ====
- Arcadia High School (Scottsdale Unified)
- Barry Goldwater High School (Deer Valley)
- Cortez High School (Glendale Union)
- Desert Vista High School (Tempe Union)
- Greenway High School (Glendale Union)
- Metrocenter Academy (Glendale Union)
- Moon Valley High School (Glendale Union)
- Mountain Pointe High School (Tempe Union)
- North Canyon High School (Paradise Valley)
- Paradise Valley High School (Paradise Valley)
- Phoenix College Preparatory Academy (Maricopa Community College District)
- Pinnacle High School (Paradise Valley)
- Sandra Day O'Connor High School (Deer Valley)
- Shadow Mountain High School (Paradise Valley)
- Sierra Linda High School (Tolleson Union)
- Sunnyslope High School (Glendale Union)
- Thunderbird High School (Glendale Union)
- Washington High School (Glendale Union)

==== Charter Schools ====
- Arizona Collegiate Charter High School
- Arizona Conservatory for Arts & Academics
- Arizona Preparatory Academy
- Arizona School for the Arts
- ASU Prep-Phoenix High School
- Career Success Schools
- Cornerstone High School
- Crestview College Preparatory High School
- Crown Point High School
- Deer Valley Academy
- Desert Garden Montessori
- Desert Marigold School
- GateWay Early College High School
- Genesis Academy
- Girls Leadership Academy of Arizona
- Glenview College Preparatory High School
- Heritage Academy Pointe
- Hope High School
- Horizon Community Learning Center
- Insight Academy of Arizona
- Jefferson Preparatory High School
- Madison Highland Prep
- Maya High School
- Metropolitan Arts Institute
- NFL YET
- North Phoenix Preparatory Academy
- Pan-American Charter School
- Premier High School
- RSD High School
- Skyline Prep High School
- Sonoran Science Academy
- South Pointe High School
- South Ridge High School
- Southwest Leadership Academy
- Summit High School
- Valiant College Preparatory
- Veritas Preparatory Academy
- West Phoenix High School
- Western School of Science and Technology

==== Religious Schools ====
- 91st Psalm Christian School
- Arizona Cultural Academy
- Arizona Lutheran Academy
- Bourgade Catholic High School
- Brophy College Preparatory
- Holy Family Academy
- Northwest Christian High School
- Paradise Valley Christian Prep
- Phoenix Christian High School
- St. Mary's High School
- Scottsdale Christian Academy
- Shearim Torah High School
- Valley Lutheran High School
- Xavier College Preparatory
- Yeshiva High School of Arizona

=== Queen Creek ===
- American Leadership Academy
- Benjamin Franklin Charter High School
- Canyon State Academy
- Casteel High School
- Crismon High School
- Heritage Academy (Gateway)
- Queen Creek High School

=== Scottsdale ===
- BASIS Scottsdale
- Bella Vista Private School
- Chaparral High School
- Cicero Preparatory Academy
- Desert Mountain High School
- Gateway Academy
- Horizon High School
- Notre Dame Preparatory High School
- Rancho Solano Preparatory High School
- Saguaro High School
- Salt River High School
- Scottsdale Preparatory Academy
- Thunderbird Adventist Academy
- Ville de Marie Academy

=== Surprise ===
- Arizona Charter Academy
- Coronado High School
- Imagine Prep at Surprise
- Paradise Honors High School
- Shadow Ridge High School
- Valley Vista High School
- Willow Canyon High School

=== Tempe ===
- Compadre Academy
- Corona del Sol High School
- James Madison Preparatory School
- Marcos de Niza High School
- McClintock High School
- The New School for the Arts and Academics
- Pinnacle High School
- Student Choice High School
- Tempe Accelerated High School
- Tempe High School
- Tempe Preparatory Academy

=== Tolleson ===
- Tolleson Union High School
- University High School

=== Wickenburg ===
- Wickenburg Christian Academy
- Wickenburg High School

== Mohave County ==
- Beaver Dam High School, Beaver Dam
- El Capitan, Colorado City
- Lake Havasu High School, Lake Havasu City
- River Valley High School, Mohave Valley

=== Bullhead City ===
- Mohave Accelerated Learning Center
- Mohave High School

=== Kingman ===
- Kingman Academy of Learning
- Kingman High School
- Lee Williams High School

== Navajo County ==
- Blue Ridge High School, Lakeside
- Cibecue Community School (Dishchii'bikoh), Cibecue
- Holbrook High School, Holbrook
- Hopi Junior/Senior High School, Keams Canyon
- Joseph City High School, Joseph City
- Mogollon High School, Heber
- Monument Valley High School, Kayenta
- Pinon High School, Pinon
- Shonto Preparatory Technology High School, Shonto
- Show Low High School, Show Low
- Winslow High School, Winslow

=== Snowflake ===
- Northern Arizona Vocational Institute of Technology
- Snowflake High School

=== Whiteriver ===
- Alchesay High School
- East Fork Lutheran School

== Pima County ==
- Ajo High School, Ajo
- Basis Schools (Oro Valley, Tucson North)
- Catalina Foothills High School, Catalina Foothills
- Cienega High School, Vail

=== Marana ===
- Marana High School
- MCAT High School
- Mountain View High School

=== Oro Valley ===
- Basis Schools Oro Valley
- Canyon del Oro High School
- Immaculate Heart High School
- Ironwood Ridge High School

=== Sahuarita ===
- Edge High School (Sahuarita campus)
- Sahuarita High School
- Walden Grove High School

=== Sells ===
- Baboquivari High School
- Tohono O'odham High School

=== Tucson ===
==== Public/Magnet Schools ====
- Amphitheater High School
- Andrada Polytechnic High School
- Catalina Magnet High School
- Cholla High Magnet School
- Desert View High School
- Edge High School (Himmel Park and Northwest campuses)
- Empire High School
- Flowing Wells High School
- Mary Meredith K-12 School
- Mica Mountain High School
- Palo Verde High School
- Pantano High School
- Pima Vocational High School
- Pueblo Magnet High School
- Rincon High School
- Sabino High School
- Sahuaro High School
- Santa Rita High School
- Sentinel Peak High School
- Sunnyside High School
- Tanque Verde High School
- Tucson High Magnet School
- University High School
- Vail Academy and High School

==== Charter Schools ====
- Academy of Tucson
- Accelerated Learning Laboratory
- Alta Vista High School
- Canyon Rose Academy
- Changemaker High School
- City High School
- Compass High School
- Desert Rose Academy Charter School
- Hiaki High School
- Mountain Rose Academy
- Nosotros Academy
- Pima Partnership High School
- Pima Rose Academy
- Presidio School
- Project MORE High School
- Sonoran Science Academy (Tucson, Davis-Monthan)
- Southern Arizona Community Academy
- Southgate Academy
- Toltecalli High School
- Tucson International Academy
- Tucson Preparatory School

==== Private Schools ====
- Desert Christian High School
- The Gregory School
- Pusch Ridge Christian Academy
- St. Augustine Catholic High School
- Salpointe Catholic High School
- San Miguel High School

== Pinal County ==
- Ray High School, Kearny
- San Manuel Junior/Senior High School, San Manuel
- Santa Cruz Valley Union High School, Eloy
- Superior Junior/Senior High School, Superior

=== Apache Junction ===
- Apache Junction High School
- Apache Trail High School
- Imagine Prep Superstition

=== Casa Grande ===
- Casa Grande Union High School
- Casa Verde High School
- Mission Heights Preparatory High School
- Pinnacle High School
- Vista Grande High School

=== Coolidge ===
- CAVIT
- Coolidge High School
- Imagine Prep at Coolidge

=== Florence ===
- Florence Baptist Academy
- Florence High School

=== Maricopa ===
- Desert Sunrise High School
- Heritage Academy (Maricopa)
- Maricopa High School

=== San Tan Valley ===
- American Leadership Academy
- Combs High School
- Poston Butte High School
- San Tan Foothills High School

== Santa Cruz County ==
- Patagonia Union High School, Patagonia
- Rio Rico High School, Rio Rico

=== Nogales ===
- Lourdes Catholic School
- Nogales High School
- Pierson Vocational High School
- Pinnacle Charter High School

== Yavapai County ==
- Ash Fork High School, Ash Fork
- Bagdad High School, Bagdad
- Camp Verde High School, Camp Verde
- Chino Valley High School, Chino Valley
- Seligman High School, Seligman
- Spring Ridge Academy, Spring Valley

=== Cottonwood ===
- American Heritage Academy Cottonwood
- Mingus Union High School
- Valley Academy for Career and Technology Education

=== Mayer ===
- Mayer High School
- The Orme School

=== Prescott ===
- Basis Schools Prescott
- Northpoint Expeditionary Learning Academy
- Prescott High School
- Tri-City College Prep High School

=== Prescott Valley ===
- Arizona Agribusiness and Equine Center (Prescott Valley branch)
- Bradshaw Mountain High School
- Canyon View Preparatory Academy
- Mingus Mountain Academy
- Pace Preparatory Academy
- Yavapai County High School

=== Rimrock ===
- Sedona Sky Academy
- Southwestern Academy

=== Sedona ===
- Sedona Red Rock High School
- Verde Valley School

== Yuma County ==
- Antelope Union High School, Wellton
- PPEP TEC High Schools (Cesar Chavez, Jose Yepez)
- San Luis High School, San Luis
- Somerton High School, Somerton

=== Yuma ===
- Aztec High School
- Carpe Diem e-Learning Community
- Cibola High School
- Gila Ridge High School
- Harvest Preparatory Academy
- Kofa High School
- Southwest Technical Education District of Yuma
- Vista Alternative High School
- Yuma Catholic High School
- Yuma High School

== Defunct schools ==
Schools in this section are listed with their years of closure in parentheses.

- Alhambra College Preparatory High School, Phoenix (2011)
- Calli Ollin High School, Tucson (2010)
- Carver High School (also known as Phoenix Union Colored High School), Phoenix (Black; 1954)
- Catalina Mountain School, Tucson (2011)
- Clarkdale High School, Clarkdale (1951)
- Clifton High School, Clifton (2012)
- Cottonwood High School, Cottonwood (1958; consolidated into Mingus Union High School)
- East High School, Phoenix (1985)
- Flagstaff Arts and Leadership Academy, Flagstaff (2026)
- Gerard Catholic High School, Phoenix (1989)
- Gila Preparatory Academy, Safford (2011)
- Guadalupe Regional High School (also known as Guadalupe Satellite at Compadre High School), Guadalupe (2007)
- Jerome High School, Jerome (1951)
- Jess Schwartz Jewish Community High School, Phoenix (2011)
- Jokake School for Girls, Scottsdale (1945)
- Judson School, Scottsdale (2000)
- Litchfield Park High School, Litchfield Park (1956; moved to Avondale and became Agua Fria High School)
- McNary High School, McNary (1980)
- Mesa Central High School/Mesa Vo-Tech High School, Mesa (1991)
- Mesa Ranch School, Mesa (1943)
- Music Mountain Junior/Senior High School, Peach Springs
- Northern Yuma County Union High School, Parker/Salome (circa mid-1950s; split into two schools)
- North Pointe Preparatory, Phoenix (2023)
- Palo Verde Christian High School, Tucson (2000; acquired and renamed Pusch Ridge Christian Academy)
- Phoenix Indian School, Phoenix (1990)
- Phoenix Technical School, Phoenix (1955; folded back into Phoenix Union)
- Phoenix Union Cyber High School, Phoenix (2010; folded into Camelback High School)
- Phoenix Union High School, Phoenix (1982)
- St. Johns Indian School, Laveen/Komatke (1976)
- St. Paul's Preparatory Academy, Phoenix (December 2009)
- Scottsdale High School, Scottsdale (1983)
- Sierra Summit Academy, Hereford (2011)
- Sinagua High School, Flagstaff (2010)
- Southwest Indian School, Peoria (1982)
- Suffolk Hills Catholic High School, Tucson (1971–90; reverted to the Immaculate Heart High School name)
- Vicki A. Romero High School, Phoenix (2012)
- West High School, Phoenix (1983, reopened 1985 as Metro Tech High School)
- Western Christian High School, Phoenix (1988)
- Westwind Preparatory Academy (2015)
- White Cone High School, Keams Canyon (2012)

== See also ==
- List of private and independent schools in Arizona
