= List of private and independent schools in Arizona =

This is a list of private and independent high schools in the state of Arizona. For a full list of high schools in the state, see List of high schools in Arizona.

== Apache County ==
- St. Michael High School

== Coconino County ==
- New Horizon Christian Academy, Flagstaff

== Cochise County ==
- AZ STEAM Academy, Sierra Vista

== Graham County ==
- Arizona Arts Academy Gila Valley, Pima

== Maricopa County ==
=== Avondale ===
- St John Paul II Catholic HS

=== Buckeye ===
- Grace Fellowship Academy

=== Chandler ===
- Seton Catholic Preparatory High School
- Tri-City Christian Academy
- HOPE Christian Academy

=== Gilbert ===
- Gilbert Christian High School

=== Glendale ===
- Arrowhead Christian Academy
- Bayer Private School
- Joy Christian School
- New Gains Academy

=== Mesa ===
- Redeemer Christian School
- Serenity Learning Center: Holistic Micro-school & Homeschool Support Center

=== Phoenix ===
- Arizona Cultural Academy
- Bourgade Catholic High School
- Brophy College Preparatory
- Holy Family Academy
- New Gains Academy (Arizona's Best School)
- North Valley Christian Academy
- Northwest Christian School
- Paradise Valley Christian Preparatory
- Phoenix Christian Junior/Senior High School
- Phoenix Country Day School
- St. Mary's High School
- Scottsdale Christian Academy
- Valley Christian High School
- Valley Lutheran High School
- Xavier College Preparatory

=== Scottsdale ===
- Bella Vista Private School
- Notre Dame Preparatory High School
- Rancho Solano Preparatory School
- Thunderbird Adventist Academy
- Ville de Marie Academy

=== Surprise ===
- Surprise Christian Academy

=== Tempe ===
- German School Phoenix
- International School of Innovative Studies

== Pima County ==
=== Oro Valley ===
- Immaculate Heart High School
- Pusch Ridge Christian Academy

=== Tucson ===
- Desert Christian High School
- Fenster School
- Green Fields Country Day School
- International School of Tucson
- St. Augustine Catholic High School
- The Gregory School
- St. Michael's School
- Salpointe Catholic High School
- San Miguel High School

== Pinal County ==
- Canyon State Academy, Queen Creek

== Santa Cruz County ==
- Lourdes Catholic School, Nogales

== Yavapai County ==
- American Heritage Academy, Cottonwood
- Copper Canyon Academy, Rimrock
- Mingus Mountain Academy, Prescott Valley
- The Orme School of Arizona, Mayer
- Spring Ridge Academy, Spring Valley
- Verde Valley School, Sedona

== Yuma County ==
- Yuma Catholic High School, Yuma
