= CPLC =

CPLC may refer to:

- Card Production Life Cycle, data object of a smart card
- Central Political and Legal Affairs Commission, Chinese Communist Party organization
- Chicanos Por La Causa, community development organization in Arizona, United States
- Citizens-Police Liaison Committee, organization in Sindh, Pakistan.
- CPLC Community Schools, schools in Tucson, Arizona, United States
- Community of Portuguese Language Countries, intergovernmental organization
- Master corporal, rank in Canadian forces abbreviated in French (caporal-chef)
