= Catalina Mountain School =

Defunct school in Arizona, United States

Address
- 14500 North Oracle Road; Near Tucson, Arizona; United States

Information
- Former name: Arizona Youth Center
- Established: 1967
- Closed: 2011
- Gender: Boys
- Affiliation: Arizona Department of Juvenile Corrections

The Catalina Mountain School, located at 14500 North Oracle Road, was a juvenile correctional school located north of Tucson, Arizona, operated by the Arizona Department of Juvenile Corrections. The facility opened on June 16, 1967 as the Arizona Youth Center, and was the oldest of the state's three juvenile centers. As of 2011, the facility had a 124-bed capacity.

A 1986 lawsuit, Johnson vs. Upchurch, filed by Catalina Mountain inmate Matthew Davey Johnson and seven other inmates, alleged that kids were warehoused at the facility without proper treatment. Johnson alleged he was “locked down" – shackled to a bed for two months with literally nothing to do. His court-appointed lawyer said Johnson did not have a mattress during the day, only a metal bed frame, and that he could not even read a book. The lawsuit was settled in 1993, and a consent decree – a list of 109 terms for improving youth prisons – was part of the settlement. The lawsuit is credited with spurring much-needed change in the youth corrections system in Arizona.

Due to unsustainable costs to operate the facility, it was closed on October 1, 2011. The all-male student body was transferred to two other DOJC facilities in Phoenix, saving the State of Arizona $1.5 million in the 2012 fiscal year and $3.6 million in the 2013 fiscal year.

The school was an associate member of the Arizona Interscholastic Association.
