= PRCA =

PRCA may refer to:

- Professional Rodeo Cowboys Association, a sports organisation
- Protestant Reformed Churches in America, a north American religious group
- Public Relations and Communications Association, a UK trade organisation
- Pure red cell aplasia, a medical condition affecting blood cells
- Pusch Ridge Christian Academy, a school in Oro Valley, Arizona
