= Desert Christian Schools =

Desert Christian Schools may refer to:

- Desert Christian Schools (Arizona)
- Desert Christian Schools (California)
