= Parker High School =

Parker High School can refer to:

- Parker High School (Alabama), Birmingham, Alabama
- Parker High School (Arizona), Parker, Arizona
- Parker School, Kamuela, Hawaii
- Parker High School (Illinois), Chicago, Illinois
- William Parker High School, Howell, Michigan
- Parker High School (South Dakota), Parker, South Dakota
- George S. Parker High School, Janesville, Wisconsin
