= The Odyssey Institute for Advanced and International Studies =

Coordinates: 33.433683°N 112.502664°W

Location
- 1495 S. Verrado Way; Buckeye, Arizona 85326; United States

Information
- School type: Public Charter School
- Motto: We Dream, We Achieve, We Lead
- Established: 2012
- Co-principals: Becky Quigley; Jessica Sabo
- Grades: 6-12
- Enrollment: 1,761 (2022–2023)
- Colors: Maroon, black, gray
- Mascot: Marty the Minotaur
- Website: Odyssey Institute

The Odyssey Institute for Advanced and International Studies (OIAIS) Buckeye, Arizona is a public charter junior high school and high school based in Buckeye, Arizona.

Students may wear maroon or black uniform shirts, and black or khaki pants/shorts. In years previous to the 2016-2017 school year, the single-campus was a combination of grades 6-8 and 9-12, but in the 2016-2017 school year, the school split to become a separated middle school and high school. Scholars in middle school may only wear black pants/shorts and a grey uniform shirt. Additionally, scholars are required to only wear (OIAIS) branded outerwear or a solid-colored jacket that corresponds with the school's colors.

OIAIS is part of a wider family of schools known as The Odyssey Preparatory Academy, which includes three K-5 schools in Buckeye and Goodyear.

The High-school and Junior-high's mascot is Marty the Minotaur. The school colors are maroon, black, white, and silver.

== Sexual Misconduct Instances ==
In 2023 it came to the public's eye that a former teacher at the school, Jessica Kramer, was found to be allegedly partaking in sexual abuse with a minor that attended the school during 2022. In early 2024, another teacher named Alyssa Paige Todd, a high school P.E. teacher was indicted with 7 counts of sexual conduct with a minor that started in December 2023 and ended in March of 2024.

== School life ==
The Odyssey Institute highly encourages Arts, Academics, and Athletics. Odyssey strongly emboldens scholars to be involved in every aspect of school life.

== Academics ==
Odyssey is an academically-minded learning institution; it participates in the International Baccalaureate Diploma Programme.

== Arts ==
Odyssey offers several art programs including Art, Photography, Dance, Orchestra, Band, Choir, Theater, Show Choir (known at Odyssey as "Company"), and formerly Creative Writing. Odyssey's "Will Power" Shakespeare Theatre group has traveled to Europe on numerous occasions to perform in London.

== Athletics ==
Odyssey requires that all of their athletes meet consistent grade and attendance requirements. Odyssey plays in the 3A Division and has been a part of the Arizona Interscholastic Association since 2015 and hosts 19 sports. The Minotaurs have a fierce rivalry with Paradise Honors High School in football.

== FBLA ==
Odyssey is one of many schools that offer FBLA (Future Business Leaders of America) as a club to all scholars. FBLA has chapters in high schools and middle schools across the country and offers a variety of programs and resources for students to develop their leadership, communication, and business skills. For Odyssey, this has meant years of running concessions for events the school puts on, funding upgrades to the schools infrastructure and providing lunch and snacks during lunch hour* (Prices ranging from 1 to 2 USD). They hold elections each year to revamp who will lead the club and their meetings they hold every Wednesday. Overall, FBLA is an plays an integral role to the life line of Odyssey, the treasury of the school.
