= Veritas Preparatory Academy =

Charter school in Phoenix, Arizona

Location
- 3102 N. 56th St., Suite 100; Phoenix, Arizona; Arcadia; Phoenix, Maricopa, Arizona; United States; 33°29′3.39″N 111°57′40.61″W

Information
- School type: Secondary Education Charter
- Motto: "Verum, pulchrum, bonum" ("Truth, beauty, goodness") (Truth, Beauty, Goodness)
- Established: 2002
- Headmaster: Theresa Weiland
- Grades: 6 to 12 (K-6 Archway Veritas)
- Gender: Coeducational
- Enrollment: 705 (2015-2016)
- Student to teacher ratio: 10:1
- Language: English/Latin
- Campus type: Urban
- Colors: Carolina blue, black and white
- Athletics conference: 2A Metro
- Mascot: Falcons
- Nickname: VPA Falcons
- Team name: Falcons
- Publication: Humanitas (Literary and Arts Magazine), V-M Squared (Math Magazine)
- Newspaper: The Falcon Flyer
- Affiliations: Great Hearts Academies
- Website: veritasprepacademy.org

Veritas Preparatory Academy is a charter school in Phoenix, Arizona centered around classical education and is a member of the Great Hearts Academies charter network.

== School philosophy ==
As a charter school, Veritas Prep offers a Great Books education centering on fundamental texts in the Western canon. Veritas Prep's philosophy includes small class sizes that reach up to 30 students and education using the Socratic method. While at school, students are prohibited from mentioning anything seen as “Pop culture” focusing rather on classical texts and works such as those of Plato, Aristotle, and other canonical philosophers of the Western tradition.

Teachers ask questions, and prompt them to think deeply about the subject matter. A key idea or assignment might require that the teacher present material to the class, but the forward progress of the class is driven by the questions that the teacher asks of the students, the answers that they give, and the further questions that those answers inspire.

=== Curriculum overview ===
All students seeking graduation from Veritas Preparatory Academy must take at least one course in Latin. While high school students have the opportunity to choose between Spanish, French, and Latin / Ancient Greek, all 6th, 7th, and 8th grade students take Latin.

High school students are required to take one year (with an extra optional year) of honors physics, including kinetics, dynamics, electricity, magnetism, mechanical waves, light, and sound. Students also take a year of honors chemistry, honors biology, as well as natural, life, and earth science. These courses are taken alongside one year of honors calculus (calculus II is optional), honors Euclidean Geometry, and honors algebra II/trig.

Throughout middle and high school, students take five years of music, three years of studio art, and one year of honors economics, drama, and poetry. Students were forbidden from choosing their own classes with the exception of a foreign language. As of the 2020–2019 school year, students were given some electives in the high school.

=== Uniform ===
Veritas Prep uniform requires a blue or white shirt with the Veritas logo badge for all students, and a plaid skirt for girls or Khaki shorts or pants for boys. Boys are required to wear pants from fall break to spring break. All students 7th grade and above must wear black Dress shoes and black Dress socks.

=== Admission ===
As a charter school in Arizona, Veritas Preparatory Academy has no entrance requirements but limited enrollment. Interested families must apply for the school's annual admissions lottery, which takes place in the spring of each school year.

However, if a family has one child enrolled, any other children automatically receive a spot. Software designed by alumnus Joseph Irvine is used to perform these lotteries randomly.

== Achievements ==
Veritas Prep students outscored peers in every country in the Programme for International Student Assessment. Veritas was also named one of the top three high schools in all of Arizona by the Arizona Board of Regents, as nearly 20 percent of the student body is recognized as National Merit commended, semifinalists, or finalists, a percentage higher than any other school in the state.

== Facilities ==
=== Academic facilities ===
- The central location of the campus is housed on the Quayle Campus, named after the son of former United States Vice President Dan Quayle, a donor and Great Hearts Academies board member.
- Lund Center for Performing Arts, houses the school's seasonal choir concerts, drama performances, and speeches from visiting guests. Speakers have included Governor Doug Ducey, the Arizona House of Representatives, Russian-American Conductor Ignat Solzhenitsyn, and author Rod Dreher.
- John X. Evans Library, houses the Veritas Preparatory Academy Library stacks, as well as serves as a hub for social and academic life at the school.

=== Athletic facilities ===
- Van Brunt Gymnasium, dedicated to a founding member of Veritas Preparatory Academy, is home to the Falcon basketball and State Champion volleyball teams.
- Full football and soccer field, west of academic facilities.

== Athletics ==
For high school sports, Veritas Prep competes in the Arizona Interscholastic Association and is a member of its 2A Conference. Great Hearts operates its own sports league for its junior high students. Veritas is home to over 15 competing varsity athletic teams and nearly 15 junior varsity and middle school teams.

The Falcons have historically had a strong Volleyball program, having won 5 State Championships in Volleyball and garnering several Gatorade Player of the Year awards winners from the program. Veritas has also won 2 Individual State Championships in Swimming. In 2020, the Boys Varsity Soccer Team won the AIA 3A State Championship for the first male team championship in the history of the school. Also in 2020, the Falcons won the Boys AIA Division 4 State Championship in Cross Country.

== Notable alumni ==
Sarah Sponcil (2014) qualified for the Tokyo Olympics in beach volleyball.
