= MTHS =

MTHS can be one of the following high schools:

- Manheim Township High School, in Lancaster, Pennsylvania, USA
- McKinley Technology High School, in Washington, MC D.C.
- Metamora Township High School, in Metamora, IL, USA
- Metro Tech High School, in Phoenix, Arizona, USA
- Monroe Township High School, in Middlesex County, New Jersey, USA
- Monterey Trail High School, in Elk Grove, California, USA
- Montville Township High School, in Montville, New Jersey, USA
- Mother Teresa High School, in Ottawa, Canada
- Mountlake Terrace High School, in Mountlake Terrace, Washington, USA
