= Immaculate Heart High School =

Immaculate Heart High School may refer to:

- Immaculate Heart High School (Arizona), Oro Valley, Arizona
- Immaculate Heart High School (Los Angeles), Los Angeles, California
