= Tempe Preparatory Academy =

Secondary school in Maricopa County, Arizona

Location
- Tempe, Arizona; United States; 33°23′33″N 111°55′07″W

Information
- Type: Public (charter) secondary
- Motto: Verum, pulchrum, bonum "Truth, beauty, goodness"
- Established: 1996
- Grades: 6–12
- Enrollment: High School: About 240 students. Junior High School: About 440 students (Feb 26)
- Colors: Royal blue and gold
- Mascot: Knights
- Accreditation: North Central Association, American Academy for Liberal Education
- Website: http://www.tempeprep.org/

Tempe Preparatory Academy is a public charter school in Tempe, a suburb of Phoenix, Arizona in the United States. Founded in 1996, Tempe Preparatory Academy (also known as Tempe Prep or TPA) offers a Great Books, core liberal arts curriculum centered on Western tradition, history, language, and literature. Its motto is Verum, Pulchrum, Bonum, meaning Truth, Beauty, Goodness. It is also the founding model for the Great Hearts Academies schools, with which it is otherwise unaffiliated. Tempe Prep is an independently-governed public charter school.

== Academic and Extracurricular Recognition ==
Tempe Prep's Academic Recognitions include:

- National Blue Ribbon School, U.S. Department of Education (2008) Blue Ribbon Award.
- Tempe Prep earned ratings of "excelling" from Arizona in 2008 and 2010.

== Academics ==
Tempe Preparatory Academy offers a set academic curriculum for each grade level. In addition, 9-12th grade students may choose to study Latin/Greek, French, Spanish, or German.

"A cornerstone of the liberal arts curriculum at Tempe Preparatory Academy is the Humane Letters Seminar. In the 9th through 12th grades, English, history, philosophy, and economics are combined in Humane Letters, a 2-hour long, daily seminar directed Socratically and revolving around primary source readings from Western Civilization’s best works. The goal of the HL sequence is to help students understand the Trivium (grammar, logic, and rhetoric) in the humanities through close textual readings, daily group discussions, and intensive, progressive writing assignments".

Tempe Preparatory Academy added a 6th grade in 2008.

- 6th Grade: Language Arts, Math, Science, Drama, Ancient History
- 7th grade: Literature and Composition, American History I, Pre-Algebra, Life Science, Latin I, Art / Music Theory
- 8th grade: Literature and Composition, American History II, Algebra, Earth Science, Latin II, Art / Music Theory
- 9th grade: Humane Letters Seminar (emphasis: Ancient—High Middle Ages i.e., Semitic, Greek, Roman, Byzantine, Islamic, Germanic—Literature/History/Philosophy) (2 Hours), Geometry, Biology, Music / Poetry, Latin III or Modern Language I
- 10th grade: Humane Letters Seminar (emphasis: European History/Literature/Early Modern Political Thought) (2 Hours), Algebra II, Chemistry, Music Theory / Poetry, Advanced Latin or Modern Language II
- 11th grade: Humane Letters Seminar (emphasis: American History/Literature/Political Thought) (2 Hours), Pre-Calculus/Calculus, Physics I, Drama / Art, Beginning Greek or Modern Language III
- 12th grade: Humane Letters Seminar (emphasis: Roman Empire through the Middle Ages and into the modern era) (2 Hours), Calculus, Physics II/Chemistry II/Biology II, Drama / Art, Intermediate Greek or Modern Language IV

=== Senior thesis and defense ===
"The culminating project for an Academy student is the Senior Thesis. At the beginning of the senior year, the student selects a field of inquiry from the curriculum — literature, philosophy, math, science, the arts — and then reads three or four substantial primary texts to examine in preparation for writing a 15 - 20 page analytical paper. At its core, the thesis is an exploration of one of the “Six Great Ideas” of humanity summarized as Truth, Beauty, Goodness, Justice, Liberty, and Equality. Students discuss texts in small group seminars composed of students, faculty, staff and board members, and work individually with a faculty member on the paper. After submitting the paper in the second semester, the senior then publicly defends the thesis before a three-member panel of faculty reviewers and also the community at large".

== Student life ==
=== Activities ===
Tempe Prep offers many extracurriculars in fine arts and academics. Although Tempe Prep is a small school, the Speech and Debate team and Odyssey of the Mind teams are competitive, regularly placing in the top 5 at tournaments with many schools over 10 times the size. Tempe Prep has won the Arizona 1A-2A-3A State Champion in Speech and Debate every year from 2006, through 2013. The Speech and Debate team moved to AIA Division I competition as of 2013. The Odyssey of the Mind teams won the State Championship between 2002 until 2007 with a World Final Placement of 5th place in 2004, 4th place in 2007, 2nd place in 2008, and 5th place in the 2009 World Finals Competition.

Extracurricular Academic Clubs include, Speech and Debate (nine years state champions), High School Robotics Club (5th in World Competition 2015), Junior High Robotics League, Math Club, Art Club, Spanish Club, Yearbook, Song writing club, School Newspaper, History Club, Herstory Club, dungeons and dragons club and National Honor Society.

The school also offers numerous Extracurricular Performing Arts Groups, such as Sinfonia (school orchestra), Junior Varsity Strings, Junior High Choir, and Cantamus, High School varsity choir, which sang at the 2026 Flagstaff Jazz Madrigal.

=== Athletics ===
In high school athletics, Tempe Prep competes in the AIA (Arizona Interscholastic Association) and is a member of its 2A Conference. Among the school's strengths are track and field, where the women's team has won six state titles including five straight from 2005 to 2009, runner-up 2012, 2013, 2014 and the men's team has won three of its own. In women's soccer, the school won the state 1A-2A-3A winter championship in 2008; they also claimed the Women's Division IV basketball championship in 2012 and were runners-up in 2013, losing the title by 2 points in the last 14 seconds of the game. In total, Tempe Prep high school sports teams have won a total of 11 state championships. In 2014, Tempe Prep become the first charter school in Arizona history to reach a state football final. Junior high athletics compete in the Valley Christian Schools League

- Junior High School: Football, Volleyball, Co-Ed Soccer, Swim, Softball, Baseball, Cross Country, Track, Girls' Basketball, Boys' Basketball, Co-Ed Golf
- High School: Football, Cheerleading, Cross Country, Volleyball, Swim, Girls' Basketball, Boys' Basketball, Girls' Soccer, Boys' Soccer, Baseball, Softball, Co-Ed Golf
