= Scottsdale Preparatory Academy =

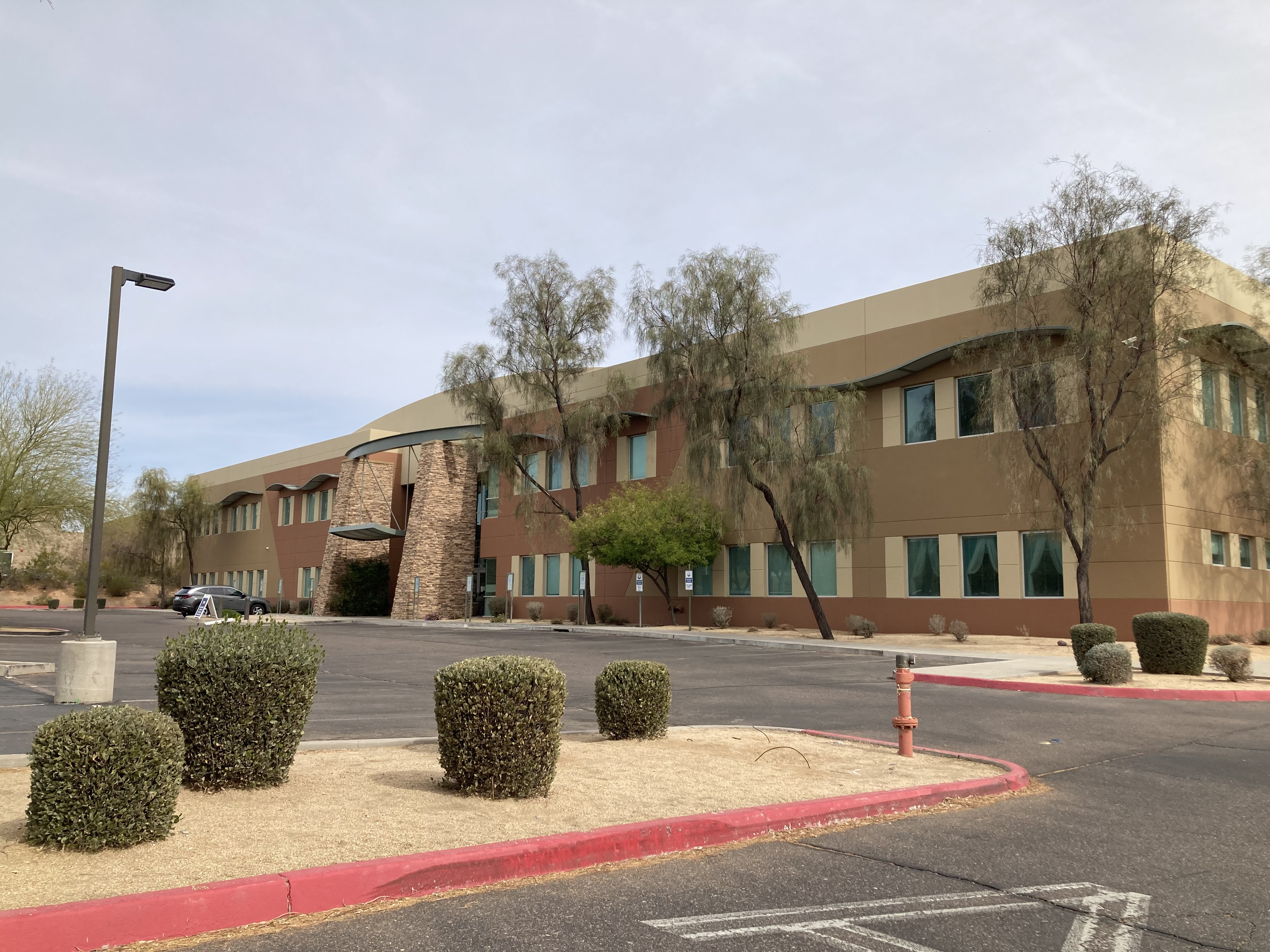
- Scottsdale Prep pictured in 2025.

Location
- 16537 North 92nd Street; Scottsdale, Arizona 85260; United States
- 33°38′03″N 111°52′55″W

Information
- School type: Charter
- Motto: Truth, Beauty, and Goodness
- Established: 2007
- Headmaster: Mark McAfee
- Grades: 6–12
- Enrollment: High school: 259 (October 1, 2012)
- Colors: Navy and white
- Athletics conference: Arizona Interscholastic Association 2A
- Nickname: Spartans
- Newspaper: The SPArrow
- Affiliation: Great Hearts Academies
- Website: www.scottsdaleprep.org

Scottsdale Preparatory Academy is a charter school in Scottsdale, Arizona owned by Great Hearts Academies. It serves grades 6 to 12. It moved to a different campus in the 2011–2012 school year, also accommodating the fifth grade portion of GHA's Archway Scottsdale. The school is a member of the Great Hearts Academies.

The first senior class graduated in the 2011–2012 school year.
