= CPLC Community Schools =

Charter high schools in Tucson, Arizona

Address
- 200 N. Stone Avenue Tucson, Arizona; United States

District information
- Grades: 9-12
- Established: 1997; 28 years ago
- Enrollment: 317

Other information
- Website: CPLC Community Schools

CPLC Community Schools is an operator of two charter high schools in Tucson, Arizona and one charter high school in Phoenix, AZ. It has some 300 students and 17 faculty members. It is an affiliate of Chicanos Por La Causa. As of 2007, CPLC Community Schools has approximately 317 students and approximately 17 faculty members. Hiaki High School were founded in association with the Pascua Yaqui Tribe.

== Schools ==
- Toltecalli High School (Arcadia)
- Envision High School
- Girls Leadership Academy of Arizona

=== No Longer Operated by CPLC Community Schools ===
- Hiaki High School

=== Defunct ===
- Calli Ollin High School (2010)
- Itzcalli Academy (2005)
