= Arete Preparatory Academy =

Charter school in Gilbert, Arizona, United States

Coordinates: 33.378°N 111.735°W

Great Hearts Arete Prep

Location
- 4525 E. Baseline Rd. Gilbert 85234; United States

Information
- School type: Charter
- Established: 2006
- Headmaster: Mark McAfee
- Grades: 6-12
- Enrollment: 410 students (2013-14)
- Colors: Dark green and black
- Mascot: Chargers
- Affiliation: Great Hearts Academies
- Website: areteprepacademy.greatheartsamerica.org

Great Hearts Arete Preparatory Academy (formerly Mesa Preparatory Academy) is a charter school in Gilbert, Arizona. It is part of Great Hearts Academies.

In 2014, the school moved to a location in Gilbert. The school changed its name to Great Hearts Arete Prep and its mascot from Monsoons to Chargers.

== Curriculum ==
The school's curriculum places a heavy emphasis on the Greco-Roman world and classical studies, with students studying Latin in middle school and, if elected, Greek in high school.

== Athletics ==
Arete Prep (while under the Mesa Prep name) became a full member of the Arizona Interscholastic Association for high school athletics in the 2012-13 school year.

In May 2012, Mesa Preparatory Academy won the Charter Athletic Association state baseball championship, after Our Lady of Sorrows Academy in Phoenix, a traditionalist Catholic school affiliated with the Society of St. Pius X, refused to play in (and thus forfeited) the championship game against Mesa Prep because MPA's team included a female infielder.
