= Chandler Preparatory Academy =

Charter school in Maricopa County, Arizona, US

- 1951 North Alma School Road; Chandler, Arizona 85224; United States

Information
- School type: Charter
- Motto: Verum Bonum Pulchrum
- School district: Great Hearts Academies
- Headmaster: John-Paul Poppleton
- Grades: 6th–12th
- Gender: Co-ed
- Enrollment: 713 (2022–2023)
- Colors: Red and Black
- Athletics conference: Arizona Interscholastic Association
- Mascot: Titans
- Website: https://www.chandlerprep.greatheartsamerica.org/

Chandler Preparatory Academy is a small liberal arts charter school that was established in 2005 offering schooling for Grades 6–12. In 2010, Chandler Preparatory Academy celebrated its first graduating class, which consisted of fewer than fifty students; and, also opened their current campus, with a football field and gym. The campus opened in conjunction with Archway Classical Academy, a similarly modeled school for K–5 students. In 2019, 10 seniors at Chandler Prep finished their High school career achieving perfect GPA scores.

== Curriculum ==
Chandler Prep follows a strictly liberal arts curriculum. All students are required to follow a core curriculum with the addition of Latin in Grades 6–8 and their choice of one foreign language in Grades 9–12 (Latin then Ancient Greek, German, Spanish, or French). The Fine Arts curriculum rotates between Art, Poetry, Music, and Drama.

== Notable alumni ==
- James Rallison – YouTube creator

== See also ==
- Great Hearts Academies
- Classical education movement
- Liberal Arts
