= Adobe Mountain School =

High school in Arizona, United States

Coordinates: 33°42′08″N 112°07′06″W

Location
- 2700 W Pinnacle Peak Road; Phoenix, Arizona; Arizona 85083; United States

Information
- Former name: Arizona Girls' School
- Type: Secondary school
- Established: 23 June 1971
- Mascot: Bulldogs

Adobe Mountain School is the only secondary school operated by the Arizona Department of Juvenile Corrections (formerly one of four). It is located inside AZDJC's facility at Interstate 17 and Pinnacle Peak Road in Phoenix, Arizona. It is a member of the Canyon Athletic Association and an associate member of the Arizona Interscholastic Association. Its colors are black and white, and its mascot is the Bulldogs.
