= Great Hearts Anthem =

Charter school in Arizona, United States

Location
- 3950 W Arroyo Norte Drive; Phoenix, Arizona 85087; United States
- 33°52′56″N 112°08′41″W

Information
- School type: Charter
- Established: 2009
- Headmaster: Zachary Withers
- Grades: K-12
- Colors: Maroon and Navy
- Mascot: Eagle
- Affiliation: Great Hearts Academies
- Website: https://anthem.greatheartsamerica.org

Great Hearts Anthem is a public charter elementary and high school in north Phoenix, Arizona. It is operated by Great Hearts Academies. The school opened in 2009, and currently has a student population of 1,030 students. The school is currently ranked 5,731st in the United States. Greathearts anthem is well known throughout its region for its rigorous education course, high academic standards, and emphasis on character development. The school's philosophy is based on the belief that the human intellect can attain knowledge through reason, hard work, and disciplined study. and it is a member of the Arizona Interscholastic Association.
