= Desert Hills High School =

Desert Hills High School may refer to one of these two schools:

- Desert Hills High School (Utah) in St. George, Utah
- Desert Hills High School (Arizona) in Gilbert, Arizona
