= Colegio Fray Pedro de Gante =

Roman Catholic school in Nogales, Sonora, Mexico

Location
- Calle Termopilas S/N, Col. Kennedy; Nogales, Sonora 8400; Mexico

Information
- School type: Roman Catholic
- Established: 1946
- Grades: 12
- Enrollment: 133 Prep students, projected (2010–11)
- Mascot: Águilas (Eagles)
- Website: colegio-gante.com/educacion

Colegio Fray Pedro de Gante is a Roman Catholic school in Nogales, Sonora. It was founded in 1946 by Father Ignacio de la Torre (commonly referred to as Padre Nacho). From 2010 to 2012, it was an associate member of the Arizona Interscholastic Association for the purpose of scrimmaging with Arizona high schools in football. All matches were played in Arizona.

== School levels ==
The school is divided into four levels:

- Preescolar/Jardín de Niños (equivalent to kindergarten)
- Primaria (equivalent to US grades 1–6)
- Secundaria (equivalent to US grades 7–9)
- Preparatoria (equivalent to US grades 10–12)
