= Glendale Preparatory Academy =

Coordinates: 33.695128°N 112.238662°W

Location
- 23276 N. 83rd Ave. Suite 1 Peoria, Arizona 85383; United States

Information
- School type: Charter
- Established: 2007
- Headmaster: Rachel Janssen
- Grades: 6-12
- Enrollment: 460 Students (2017-18); 160 (High School, October 1, 2017); 300 (Middle School, October 1, 2017)
- Colors: Navy and gold
- Mascot: Griffins
- Affiliation: Great Hearts Academies
- Website: http://www.glendaleprep.org/

Glendale Preparatory Academy is a Public Charter high-school and middle-school in Peoria, Arizona. It is part of Great Hearts Academies.

The curriculum emphasizes the Liberal Arts and has seminar-based classes and honors level courses.
