= Arizona Department of Juvenile Corrections =

State agency

Agency overview
- Formed: July, 1990
- Preceding agency: Juvenile Corrections Division of the Arizona Department of Corrections
- Jurisdiction: Arizona
- Headquarters: 100 North 15th Avenue, Suite 103 Phoenix, Arizona 85007
- Agency executive: Doug Sargent, Director
- Website: adjc.az.gov

The Arizona Department of Juvenile Corrections (ADJC) is a state agency of Arizona, headquartered in Downtown Phoenix.

The agency was formed by Senate Bill 1034 and became effective in July 1990.

Adobe Mountain School is the only secure facility managed by the agency and is an associate member of the Arizona Interscholastic Association. The Adobe Mountain School has units for both boys and girls.

The agency houses and treats seriously delinquent, violent, and Seriously Mentally Ill youth who have been committed by the Juvenile Courts, up to 19 years of age. Committed delinquents are screened for psychological, medical, social, and criminal factors, and provided with the necessary programming and treatment to make them capable of being productive members of society. Youth who successfully complete rehabilitation are eligible to be released on parole, where they are supervised by parole officers, usually in their home community.

The agency previously operated facilities in Pima County (Catalina) and in Buckeye (Eagle Point), Eagle Point School was in the complex. and a girls-only unit adjacent to the Adobe Mountain facility (Black Canyon). The facilities, except for Adobe Mountain, closed in 2009–10.

The ADJC has had 4 different directors since 2013, Charles Flanagan, Dona Marie Markley, Jeff Hood, and current Director Doug Sargent.
