= Marcus Thomas (running back) =

American football player (born 1984)

No. 33
- Position: Running back

Personal information
- Born: May 28, 1984 (age 42); Phoenix, Arizona, U.S.
- Listed height: 6 ft 0 in (1.83 m)
- Listed weight: 215 lb (98 kg)

Career information
- High school: Tolleson Union (Tolleson, Arizona)
- College: Texas-El Paso
- NFL draft: 2008: 5th round, 166th overall pick

Career history
- San Diego Chargers (2008)*; Detroit Lions (2008); Dallas Cowboys (2008)*; Cleveland Browns (2009)*; Denver Broncos (2009)*
- * Offseason or practice squad member only

Career NFL statistics
- Games played: 5
- Stats at Pro Football Reference

Marcus Bernard Thomas (born May 28, 1984) is an American former professional football player who was a running back for the Detroit Lions of the National Football League (NFL). He played college football for the UTEP Miners and was selected by the San Diego Chargers in the fifth round of the 2008 NFL draft.

== Early life ==
Thomas attended Tolleson Union High School in Tolleson, Arizona. As a sophomore, he was the backup of future NFL player Mike Bell. As a junior, he was a two-way player at running back and free safety. He registered 2,087 rushing yards, 27 touchdowns and 25 receptions for 580 yards, while leading Tolleson to the 4A state playoffs. He received All-Region and All-state honors.

As a senior, he was named Arizona State High School Player of the Year and a Parade All-American, after setting Arizona high school records for rushing yards in a single-season with 3,573 yards and 47 touchdowns. He also made 10 receptions for 350 yards and 3 receiving touchdowns.

Thomas set the state record for career 400-yard rushing games, single-season 400-yard rushing games and the single-game rushing record with 424 yards against Moon Valley High School. He left as the state of Arizona's all-time leading high school rusher with 5,878 yards and only the third back in state history with back-to-back 2,000-yard rushing seasons.

He also lettered in basketball and track. He competed in the 100 metres, 200 metres, 4 × 100 metres relay, high jump and long jump. As a sophomore he was part of the team that won the state title. As a junior, the team finished second, with him taking first place in the 4 × 100 metres relay, second in the long jump, third in the 200 metres and fourth in the high jump at the state meet.

== College career ==
Thomas accepted a football scholarship from the University of Texas at El Paso. As a freshman, he appeared in 10 games, collecting 37 carries for 145 yards (3.9-yard avg.) and 3 receptions for seven yards.

As a sophomore, he began the season as a redshirt. He played in 11 games, becoming a starter in the last 6 contests. He posted 149 carries for 791 yards (5.3-yard avg.), 5 rushing touchdowns, 32 receptions for 440 yards (13.8-yard avg.), 5 receiving touchdowns, 4 kickoff returns for 65 yards (16.2-yard avg.) and 1,296 (117.8 ypg) all-purpose yards. He rushed for 100 yards in the final four regular-season games (469 yards), becoming the first player in school history to compile four consecutive 100-yard rushing games. He had his breakout game against Tulane University, registering 203 yards of total offense with 93 yards rushing (12 carries, one touchdown) and 110 receiving (five receptions). He ranked seventh in the conference and 70th in the nation in rushing (71.9 ypg), seventh in C-USA and 59th in the NCAA in all-purpose yards (117.8 ypg).

As a junior, he appeared in 11 games with 10 starts. He led the team with 156 carries for 513 yards (3.3-yard avg.) and 5 rushing touchdowns. He also made 39 receptions (third on the team) for 242 yards (fifth on the team) and one receiving touchdown. He rushed for a career-high 207 yards and 3 touchdowns against SMU, helping the team tie the second-largest comeback in program history with a 48-45 overtime win.

As a senior, he led the team with 227 carries for 1,166 yards (5.1-yard avg.), 16 rushing touchdowns. He was fifth on the team with 20 receptions for 268 yards and 2 receiving touchdowns. He ranked ninth in the nation in scoring (9.8 points per game) and 26th in rushing (106 yards per game). He had a school-record seven 100-yard games, becoming only the seventh player in Miner history to rush for more than 1,000 yards and the fourth to score more than 100 points in a single-season.

He finished his career as the school's fifth all-time leading rusher (2,615 yards), third-leading scorer (26 rushing touchdowns), fourth in 100-yard games (11) and seventh in all-purpose yards (3,660).

== Professional career ==
=== San Diego Chargers ===
Thomas was selected by the San Diego Chargers in the fifth round (166th overall) of the 2008 NFL draft. He was waived on August 30.

=== Detroit Lions ===
On August 31, 2008, a day after being let go by the Chargers, Thomas was claimed off waivers by the Detroit Lions. He appeared in three games for the Lions before being waived on October 9 when the team signed fullback Moran Norris. During his three games with the Lions, he returned four kickoffs for 93 yards (a 23.3 yards average return).

=== Dallas Cowboys ===
On December 17, 2008, he was signed to the practice squad of the Dallas Cowboys and remained there through the end of the season.

=== Cleveland Browns ===
On January 7, 2009, he was signed to a future contract by the Cleveland Browns. He was waived on July 15.

=== Denver Broncos ===
On August 12, 2009, he was signed as a free agent by the Denver Broncos. He was waived on September 4.
