= Arizona Charter Academy =

Location
- 16011 N. Dysart Rd. Surprise, Arizona 85374; United States
- Coordinates: 33°37′47″N 112°20′30″W

Information
- Type: Public charter high school
- Grades: K-8
- Enrollment: High school: 352 (October 1, 2012)
- Color(s): Maroon, white
- Mascot: Bulldogs
- Website: http://www.azcharter.com

Arizona Charter Academy (ACA) is a coeducational, public charter school located in Surprise, Arizona, USA. The school population is largely from the cities of El Mirage, Surprise, Peoria, Youngtown and Glendale. ACA provides instructions for students in grades kindergarten through 8th grade. ACA has been designated by the Arizona Learns Achievement Profile as "Performing Plus". It was a candidate for accreditation by the now dissolved North Central Association. The school mascot is a bulldog. Starting in the 2017–2018 school year, this school has dropped the high school portion of the school, making it a K-8 school.

== Extracurricular activities ==
=== Service learning opportunities ===
Service learning opportunities include the Mexico House Building Trip (open to qualified high school students: twenty staff and students journey to Puerto Peñasco, Mexico to build a home for a family living in poverty), Habitat for Humanity (where students help construct a house for a family in their community), the West Side Food Bank and the Annual Blood Drive for United Blood Services.

== Athletics ==
The school is a member of the Arizona Interscholastic Association.
