= Guadalupe Regional High School =

Defunct high school in Maricopa County, Arizona

Coordinates: 33°21′44″N 111°57′41″W

Guadalupe Regional High School, also known as Guadalupe Satellite at Compadre High School during its final year, was a small high school in Guadalupe, Arizona. It was run by the Tempe Union High School District after it was turned over by the Maricopa County Regional School District in 2006 for financial reasons.

The school, after this move, lost 35 students to bring it down to an enrollment of just 25:

- Many students had missed too many classes and had to be dropped due to state regulations.
- 12 other students transferred to Compadre at the beginning of the school year.
- Due to a lack of offerings or needed specialized attention, some students were transferred, particularly to Marcos de Niza High School, the closest public high school.

Because of this, the Tempe Union High School District began to consider closure of the school. A million dollar budget shortfall in the district forced the closure of the school, which had shrunk even further to 16 students. Of those 16, four graduated after summer school, two moved to Marcos, and ten moved to Compadre itself.

It was located at a Boys and Girls Club facility in Guadalupe.
