= Imagine Prep at Coolidge =

Coordinates: 32.9889°N 111.5379°W

Imagine Prep Coolidge

Location
- 1290B W Vah Ki Inn Road; Coolidge, Arizona 85128; United States

Information
- School type: Public charter school
- Established: 2011 (15 years ago)
- CEEB code: 030632
- Colors: Navy blue and silver
- Mascot: Eagles
- Website: imagineprepcoolidge.com

Imagine Prep Coolidge is a charter junior high and high school in Coolidge, Arizona. It is operated by Imagine Schools. It is a full member of the Arizona Interscholastic Association.

In 2024, Imagine Prep Coolidge placed sixth in agricultural sales and tenth in dairy evaluation at the annual Arizona FFA competition.
