= Gila Bend Unified School District =

School district in Arizona, United States

Address
- 308 North Martin Avenue Gila Bend, Arizona, 85337; United States

District information
- Type: Public
- Grades: PreK–12
- NCES District ID: 0403310

Students and staff
- Students: 450
- Teachers: 27.02
- Staff: 36.0
- Student–teacher ratio: 16.65

Other information
- Website: gbusd.org

The Gila Bend Unified School District is a small school district in the town of Gila Bend, Arizona. It operates a combined Gila Bend elementary/junior high school and Gila Bend High School. In addition to Gila Bend, the district includes San Lucy Village and Cotton Center.
