= Tolleson Union High School =

Secondary school in Maricopa County, Arizona

Coordinates: 33.4497647°N 112.2632101°W

Location
- 9419 West Van Buren Street; Tolleson, Arizona 85353; United States

Information
- Type: Secondary Public School
- Established: 1927
- School district: Tolleson Union High School District
- Principal: Martin Perez Jr.
- Staff: 101.00 (FTE)
- Grades: 9–12
- Enrollment: 2,467 (2023–2024)
- Student to teacher ratio: 24.43
- Color
- Mascot: Wolverine
- Newspaper: The Wolver News
- Website: http://www.tuhsd.org/

Tolleson Union High School is a four-year high school located in Tolleson, Arizona. It was established in 1927 and is the only high school within the city limits of Tolleson. Tolleson is the oldest of the six schools in the Tolleson Union High School District.

== Students ==
In the 2006–2007 school year, Tolleson received an AZ LEARNS achievement profile of Performing Plus from the Arizona Department of Education, which is "an informal recognition of schools that have shown improvement ... but do not have a sufficient number of students exceeding the standard".

== Academic programs ==
=== University High School ===
Main Article: University High School (Tolleson)

Established in 2006, University High School is a TUHSD college preparatory school within Tolleson Union High School. Students are required to apply for the academy. Acceptance to the program is determined primarily by various academic scores. Recently, ASU has been working closely with the staff to provide maximum support for its gifted students. Dr. Josh Dean was the Operations Administrator and founder of University High. Ms. Courtney Stevens was the counselor of UH students but was promoted to Operations administrator when Dr. Dean was promoted to a district office.

Most students achieve post-secondary education. The first graduating class in 2010 walked away with about 3 million dollars in Scholarships between about 100 people, some of them with multiple scholarships. Newer versions of books are used, which have been circulating since the school began. UH students are not given special treatment, but they are expected to work harder than other students.

In 2010, the school's usage of tutor buses was cut as part of other cuts to the Tolleson Union budget. However, in 2011, buses were brought back into the program.

== Notable alumni ==
- Merle Keagle, All-American Girls Professional Baseball League 1944 to 1948, Baseball Hall Of Fame, Cooperstown, NY; 1941 graduate of Tolleson High
- Bob Stump, US Congressman 1977-2003
- Mike Bell, running back for the New Orleans Saints
- Nick Hysong, pole vaulter, 2000 Olympic gold medalist
- Juan Mendez, politician
- Marcus Thomas, running back for the Cleveland Browns
- Clancy Pendergast, football coach (former Arizona Cardinals assistant, 2004–09)
