= Bourgade Catholic High School =

Location
- 4602 North 31st Avenue; Phoenix, Arizona, Maricopa 85017; United States; 33°30′16″N 112°7′35″W

Information
- Type: Private, co-educational
- Religious affiliation: Roman Catholic
- Established: 1962
- Principal: Tom Brennan
- Grades: 9–12
- Enrollment: 398 (July 14, 2020)
- Colors: Navy blue and gold
- Athletics conference: AIA 3A
- Mascot: Golden Eagles
- Accreditation: Western Catholic Educational Association and North Central Association of Colleges and Schools
- Newspaper: N/A
- Yearbook: Anchor
- Tuition: $14,880
- Website: www.bourgadecatholic.org

Bourgade Catholic High School is a diocesan, co-educational Roman Catholic high school in Phoenix, Arizona, United States. It is located in the Roman Catholic Diocese of Phoenix. It is a 27-acre campus located at 4602 N. 31st Avenue, just west of Interstate 17, and several miles from downtown Phoenix.

== History ==
Bourgade Catholic High School is named after the Most Reverend Archbishop Peter Bourgade, a French missionary priest sent to the New Mexico-Arizona Territories in 1869 and the first Bishop of the newly created Diocese of Tucson.

Bishop Green established Bourgade Catholic High School in 1962 to serve Catholic high school students on the west side of Phoenix. Marist priests were responsible for the principalship and taught the boys. The Institute of the Blessed Virgin Mary Sisters assisted with administration and taught the girls. Principal Fr. John H. Hillmann, S.M., and Mother M. St. Rose, I.B.V.M., Vice-Principal for Girls, welcomed 179 freshmen (76 boys and 103 girls) on the brand new Bourgade High campus on September 4, 1962. In the same year, an identical school was constructed on the east side of Phoenix, Gerard Catholic High School, which closed in 1989.

The campus at this time consisted of a one-story classroom building in which boys and girls were segregated, and Hillmann Center, which served as residence for the priests. The school mascot was the Blue Angels (named after the United States Navy Blue Angels) and the school colors were blue and tan.

Madonna Hall, built in 1962, serves as the cafeteria and the performance stage for drama, music and dance. By the end of 1964 a second story was built on the classroom building. A new wing of classrooms was completed in 1965, and the classes became co-educational.

In 1972, the Holy Cross Community of Priests from Notre Dame contracted with the Bishop of Phoenix to assume administration of the school. This contract was renewed three times and lasted fifteen years. During this period, Tepsic Gymnasium and the locker room were built. The mascot was changed to the Golden Eagles and the school colors to blue and gold.

In 1988, the Holy Cross Community relinquished administration of the school to the School Sisters of Notre Dame. In July 2012, Kathryn M. Rother became the first lay principal in Bourgade Catholic's history.

New construction and renovation on the campus occurred in the summer of 1999 as a result of the donation of labor and building supplies by Shea Homes. The Performing Arts Center, housing two classrooms, individual practice rooms, offices and storage for instruments, was completed. A gym annex containing a wrestling room, weight room and locker rooms, and snack bar were built. A new wood floor was installed in the gym and an all-weather track was added, surrounding the football field. With additional funds from the Diocese of Phoenix Today's Children Tomorrow's Leaders campaign, HVAC, electrical and lighting improvements to the classrooms were made.

A 2001 grant from the E.L. Wiegand Foundation provided desks for the Art Room, risers for use in the Performing Arts Center, plus improved lighting, acoustical treatments, stage, drapes and sound in Madonna Hall.

In June 2002, thanks to the Faith in the Future Capital Campaign, construction commenced on the 17,000 square foot 11-story Virginia Piper Student Services Building. It is the school chapel, which can accommodate 40 people (uncomfortably). The Student Services Building also contains the reception area, health room, library/media center, two computer labs, administrative and career/counseling offices, a conference room, safe space, the staff lounge and a faculty workroom.

A severe hail storm in October 2010 damaged roofs campus wide. All were replaced, along with the football field scoreboard and the east side windows of Madonna Hall. The "Gift from the Heart" from the Quest for Excellence dinner and auction allowed for the replacement of the marquee along 31st Avenue in spring 2012.

As a fulfillment of the Faith in the Future Capital Campaign, three major facilities projects were initiated in 2011: chapel interior upgrades, the demolition and remodeling of the Hillmann Center as a music and campus ministry center, and the construction of a multi-purpose auditorium.

In the winter of 2016 the Tepsic Gymnasium underwent a complete interior renovation. These included things such as: new wood flooring, lighting, updated artwork to match the school's current branding, fresh paint, and a new heating and cooling system to the building.

Currently, in 2024, the campus is undergoing exterior renovations to improve the look of the campus, again with the generosity of Shea Homes. Several of the athletic facilities are also undergoing renovations to their bleacher areas to accommodate more seating for Golden Eagle fans through the support of the school's Booster Club.

== Notable alumni ==
- Mike Cosgrove, former MLB pitcher for the Houston Astros.
- Robert Meza, member of the Arizona House of Representatives and former Arizona State Senator.
- Vince Welnick (1951–2002), keyboard player with The Tubes and Grateful Dead.
