= New Visions Academy =

School in Apache County, Arizona

Coordinates: 34°44′14″N 112°01′21″W

- 86326; United States

Information
- School type: Public charter/alternative high school
- Established: 1997 (28 years ago)
- Principal: Ann Shaw-Jenkins
- Grades: 9-12

New Visions Academy is a chain of charter schools in Payson and St. Johns, Arizona.

== History ==
It was founded in 1997 as VisionQuest Academy; it changed names in April 1999. It had been sponsored by the Snowflake Unified School District until the summer of 2000. Its St. Johns campus opened in 2001; also that year, it ceased to serve grades 5 through 8 at its schools. The Star Valley/Payson campus opened in 2002 under the name Clearview Schools; it closed 2003 and was transferred in 2004. A former Springerville campus was closed in 2002 due to low enrollment.
