= San Manuel Junior/Senior High School =

Public school in San Manuel, Arizona

Location
- 711 McNab Pkwy. San Manuel, Arizona 85631; United States
- Coordinates: 32°35′51″N 110°37′56″W

Information
- School type: Public high school
- School district: Mammoth-San Manuel Unified School District
- CEEB code: 030390
- Principal: John Ryan
- Grades: 7-12
- Enrollment: 184 (9-12) (2023–2024)
- Colors: Red and blue
- Mascot: Miners
- Website: sanmanuelhs.msmusd.org

San Manuel Junior/Senior High School is a combined junior high and high school in San Manuel, Arizona. It, along with First Avenue and Mammoth elementary schools, comprises the Mammoth-San Manuel Unified School District.
