= Vicki A. Romero High School =

Defunct school in Arizona, United States

Location
- 3005 E. Fillmore Street; Phoenix, Arizona 85008; United States
- Coordinates: 33.455°N 112.017°W

Information
- School type: Public charter high school
- Established: 1998 (28 years ago)
- Closed: 2012
- Grades: 9-12
- Colors: Blue and white
- Mascot: Jaguars

Vicki A. Romero High School was a public charter high school in Phoenix, Arizona. It operated from 1998 until 2012, when renewal of its charter was declined. The site is now home to Wilson College Prep (opened 2017) of the Phoenix Union High School District.
