= Pinnacle Charter Schools =

Charter schools in Arizona, United States

Pinnacle Charter Schools operates five charter high schools in Arizona: one in Mesa, one in Casa Grande, one in Nogales, and two in Tempe. It was founded at its Tempe location in 1995. Pinnacle also offers online education programs.
