= Alhambra College Preparatory High School =

Location
- 3802 W. Maryland Avenue; Phoenix, Arizona 85019; United States
- 33°31′55″N 112°08′27″W

Information
- School type: Public charter high school
- Opened: 2009
- Closed: 2011
- School district: Alhambra Elementary School District (indirect)
- Principal: Darrell Dern
- Grades: 9-12
- Colors: Crimson and gray
- Mascot: Griffins
- Website: web.archive.org/web/20110623112239/http://alhambracollegeprep.org/

Alhambra College Preparatory High School was a public charter high school in west Phoenix, Arizona. It was operated by the Alhambra Education Foundation, and the charter holder was the Alhambra Education Partnership. Both organizations were extensions of the Alhambra Elementary School District. The school closed after the 2010-2011 school year amidst decreasing funding and lower than expected student enrollment.
