= Heritage Academy (Mesa, Arizona) =

Coordinates: 33.414172°N 111.831972°W

Location
- 32 S. Center St. Mesa, Arizona 85210; United States

Information
- School type: Charter School
- Established: 1995
- Principal: Eve Seaman
- Grades: 7–12
- Enrollment: 787 (2023–2024)
- Colors: Red, white and blue
- Athletics conference: CAA
- Mascot: Heroes
- Website: https://www.heritageacademyaz.com/

Heritage Academy is an American traditional public charter high school in central Mesa, Arizona, serving grades 7 to 12. It opened in 1995 as one of the first charter schools in the state.

== History ==
Founded in 1995 by Earl Taylor Jr., the public charter high school was one of the first schools granted a charter in Arizona after the passing of the Arizona Revised Statutes Title 15 section 181–183 in 1994. Located in Historic Downtown Mesa, the school has since opened four additional Arizona campuses in Laveen, Queen Creek, Maricopa, and Phoenix, along with three elementary schools in Mesa, Glendale, and Maricopa. It has also opened a career and technical school in partnership with East Valley Institute of Technology (EVIT).

In 2016, Americans United for Separation of Church and State filed a federal lawsuit against the school, claiming that the Heritage Academy schools violated the First Amendment, the Arizona Constitution, and Arizona state laws through its student instruction and required reading. Specifically, the AUSCS claimed that the school was teaching Taylor's belief that the Ten Commandments must be obeyed in order to attain happiness. It also claimed that there were at least two textbooks that were required readings, and were written by W. Cleon Skousen, a Mormon theologian who was closely associated with the John Birch Society and eventually "shunned" by the Church of Jesus Christ of Latter-day Saints.
