= Rancho Solano Preparatory School =

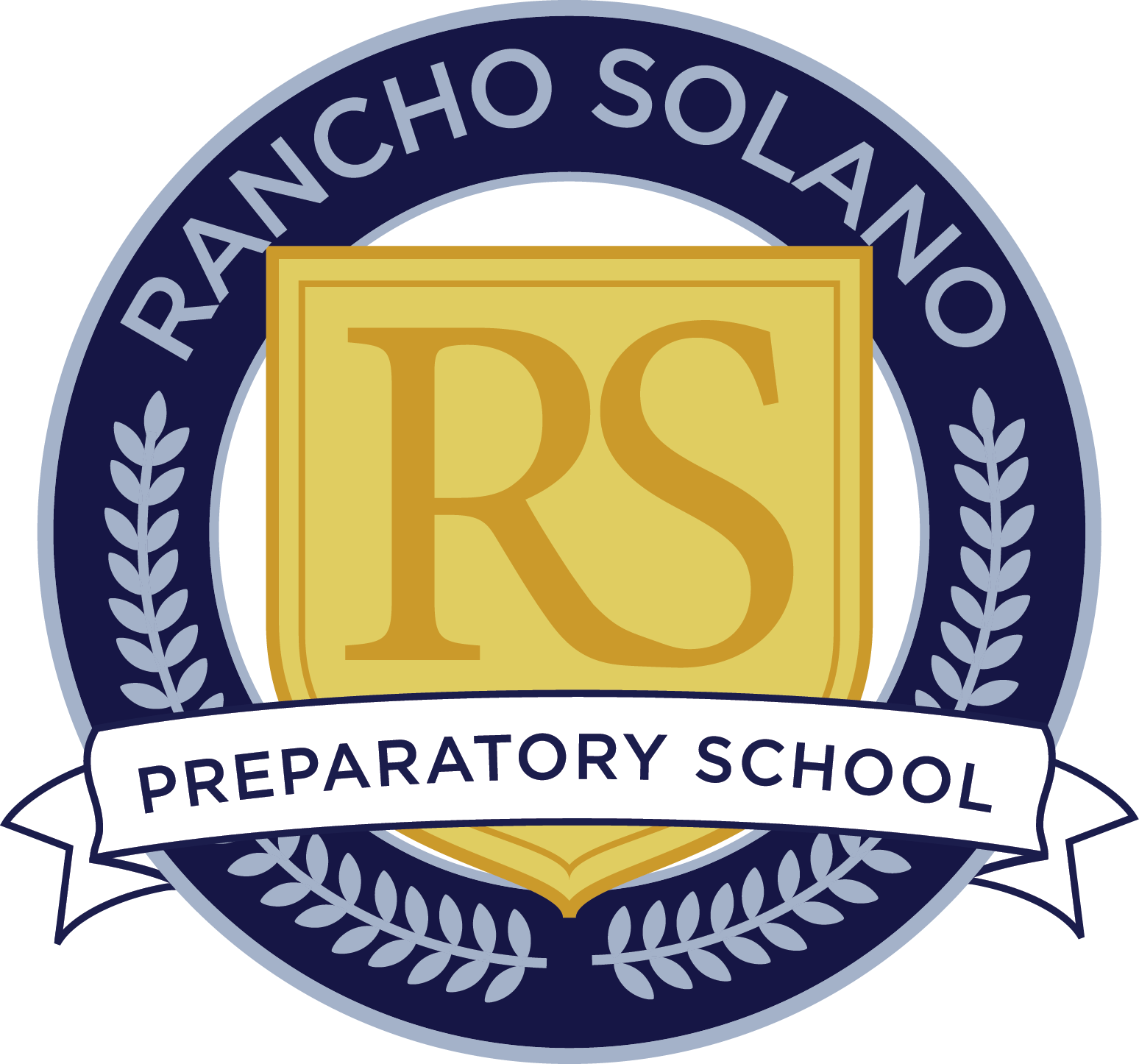

Location
- 9180 E. Via de Ventura, Scottsdale, Arizona, 85258; 5656 E. Greenway, Scottsdale, Arizona, 85254; United States; 33.5541°N 111.8842°W

Information
- School type: Private
- Established: 1954
- CEEB code: 030658
- Grades: PK2 - 12
- Gender: Co-educational
- Enrollment: 300-600
- Colours: Blue & gold
- Mascot: Blaze the Mustang
- Tuition: 22,000-25,000
- Website: www.ranchosolano.com

Rancho Solano Preparatory School is a PK-12 school located in Scottsdale, Arizona, United States. The school is part of the International Baccalaureate (IB) program.

Two schools make up Rancho Solano Preparatory School as a whole: the "Early Learning Center" (grades PK2 - Kindergarten), the Lower School (Also known as Greenway*) grades first - fifth)), the Middle School (grades sixth - eighth), and the Upper School (grades ninth - twelfth) (Both located at a campus known as the Ventura Campus*). The Early Learning Center and Lower School are located at the Greenway address, while the Middle and Upper Schools are at the Via de Ventura location, which is why they got their "Greenway and "Ventura" name.

Rancho Solano Preparatory High School is one of the newest members of the Arizona Interscholastic Association.

*All as of the 2022–23 school year, the new school year will bring changes, as the Elementary and Middle school move campuses

== History ==
In 1954, Rancho Solano Preparatory School was founded by the Bayer and Freesmeyer families. The inaugural opening of the school was at a campus located at Missouri Avenue in Phoenix, Arizona (also in 1954). In 1979, the Union Hills Campus was established but later moved to the Hillcrest campus in 2008. The Greenway campus, still serving as the home of the Early Learning Center and the Lower School today, was established in 1991. In 2003, another campus was established in Gilbert, Arizona.

The following year, in 2008, the inaugural freshman class joined the Upper School and the first graduating class was that of 2012.

Also in 2012, the new Middle and Upper School Campus, located at Via de Ventura, opened in August. The school added another building at this location, the Upper School Athletic Complex and Student Center, in 2013.

In 2007, Rancho Solano Private Schools joined the Meritas International Family of Schools. Later, in 2017, Rancho Solano joined the York Education Group.

On February 16, 2022, Rancho Solano Private Schools are establishing a new school for the elementary school right next to the Via De Ventura MS and HS school set to open in August 2023.

In 2023, Rancho Solano Private School are planning to campus a new school for middle school, right across the street from the Ventura campus, that opens in the 2023–24 school year.

In 2026, Rancho Solano opened up a new campus for 4th and 5th graders near the Ventura Campus

== Athletics ==
RSPS is a member of multiple athletic leagues with other Arizona schools. The high school is a full member of the Arizona Interscholastic Association and National Federation of State High School Associations. The middle school is a member of the Valley Christian Schools League (VCSL) and Mountain Valley Athletic League (MVAL).

In 2014 the Beach Volleyball area was constructed so a new Beach Volleyball team could practice in. The team is only for high schoolers. The team is one of the best private school Beach Volleyball teams in Arizona.

High School sports for fall include: boys' soccer, girls' volleyball, boys' cross country, girls' cross country. Winter Sports for Highschool are boys' basketball, girls' basketball, boys lacrosse, girls' lacrosse. Spring sports for Highschool are girls' sand volleyball, boys golf, boys' tennis, girls' tennis, and strength and conditioning.

Middle School sports for fall include: boys flag football, girls' volleyball, boys and girls' golf. Middle School winter sports are boys' basketball, girls' basketball, soccer, girls' soccer, boys' girls and boys tennis. Middle School spring sports are boys lacrosse, girls' lacrosse, boys and girls' cross country, and strength and conditioning, girls' pom.

Rancho also used to have a high school football team, which was eventually discontinued.

MS: 7 boys' sports, 8 girls' sports

HS: 6 boys' sports, 6 girls' sports

== Rubric Scale ==
Rubric Scale as of the 2022-2023 year for standard classes

Letter	GPA	%	Grade
A+ - A-	4.0-3.7		100-92
B+ - B-	3.3-2.7		89-80
C+ - C-	2.3-1.7		79-70
D+ - D-	1.3 - 0.7		69-60
F	0.0		59 - 0
