= Toltecalli High School =

Public charter high school in Tucson, Arizona

Location
- 251 West Irvington Road; Tucson, Arizona 85714; United States; 32°09′45″N 110°58′11″W

Information
- Type: Public charter high school
- Opened: 2002 (24 years ago)
- School district: CPLC Community Schools
- CEEB code: 030586
- Principal: Lori Mejia
- Grades: 9–12
- Enrollment: 135 (2023–2024)
- Colors: Orange and brown
- Mascot: Eagles
- Website: www.cplccommunityschools.org/toltecalli-high-school

Toltecalli High School, also known as Toltecalli Academy, is a public charter high school, located in Tucson, Arizona, United States. Toltecalli High School is one of three high schools in the Calli Ollin School District, located in downtown Tucson, and is operated by CPLC Community Schools. Founded in 2004, Toltecalli High School now serves approximately 150 students in grades nine through twelve.
