= Aztec High School (Yuma, Arizona) =

Coordinates: 32.6771°N 114.6485°W

Location
- 2330 W 28th Street; Yuma, Arizona 85365; United States

Information
- Founded: 1995 (30 years ago)
- Closed: June 30, 2022; 3 years ago
- CEEB code: 030749
- Principal: Steve Pallack
- Hours in school day: 5
- Mascot: Warriors
- Website: aztechs.org

Aztec High School in Yuma, Arizona was a school for at-risk and juvenile probation students on the site of the Yuma County Juvenile Court. It was founded in 1994 and moved to its current campus site in 2001. In the 2007–2008 school year, it served 100 students, 60 of whom were on juvenile probation. 16 students graduated, and 10 went on to colleges or universities.

== See also ==
- Alternative school
