= Edge High School =

Coordinates: 32.235089°N 110.934227°W

- Tucson, Arizona; United States

Information
- School type: Public charter high school
- Established: 1985 (41 years ago)
- CEEB code: 030194
- Grades: 9–12
- Website: edgehighschool.org

Edge High School is a public alternative high school in Tucson, Arizona, operated by The Edge School, Inc. It operates two campuses in the Tucson area. Edge Himmel Park opened in 1985 and is named after the nearby city park. It is the largest campus and home to the administrative offices. Edge Northwest opened 2004. With 172 students in grades 9-12, Edge Himmel Park has an 18 to 1 student-teacher ratio.

== History ==
It was founded in 1985 and associated with Pima Community College and Pima County Adult Education. It became a charter school in 1995. Originally renting space in an office building built in 1962, the Edge Himmel Park school completed a "green" renovation in 2008 to improve energy efficiency and incorporate sustainable architectural features such as automatic lighting.
