= San Miguel High School (Tucson, Arizona) =

Location
- 6601 South San Fernando Road, Barrio Nopal; Tucson, Pima County, Arizona 85756; United States
- 32°7′55″N 110°58′24″W

Information
- Type: Private, coeducational
- Religious affiliation: Roman Catholic
- Patron saint: Miguel Febres Cordero
- Established: 2004 (22 years ago)
- CEEB code: 030602
- President: David L. Mason
- Principal: Ernesto Badilla
- Staff: 71
- Grades: 9–12
- Enrollment: 296 (2023-2024)
- Average class size: 20; 13:1 student teacher ratio
- Colors: Red and gold
- Athletics: Arizona Interscholastic Association 2A
- Mascot: Viper
- Accreditation: North Central Association of Colleges and Schools
- Affiliation: Catholic, Lasallian; Cristo Rey Network
- Website: www.sanmiguelcristorey.org

San Miguel High School is a private Catholic and Lasallian college and college preparatory school located on the south side of Tucson, Arizona, United States. It is a member of the Cristo Rey Network of work-study schools.

== History ==
San Miguel High School opened in 2004 to assist capable students from families of limited means to prepare for college. It follows the Cristo Rey work-study model, whereby students work in businesses five days a month to earn 40% of their tuition. In its first nine years, the school had 492 graduates, all of whom were admitted to college. Current enrollment is 296, with 71 on the staff. About 97% of the students are Hispanic.

== Academics ==
A total of 24 credits are required for graduation, as is participation in the Corporate Internship program. Four credits are required in English, mathematics, religious studies, and science; three in foreign language and social studies; and one in visual/performing arts and in academic skills/literacy.

=== Corporate partners ===
There are currently over 100 corporate partners that employ San Miguel students as part of the national Cristo Rey Network Corporate Work Study program. Videos are available on various aspects of the San Miguel experience.
