= Gerard Catholic High School =

Defunct school in Arizona, United States

Gerard Redcoat mascot

Gerard Catholic High School was a Roman Catholic high school which opened in 1962 in Phoenix, Arizona. It was named for Msgr. Edward Gerard, one of the first ordained priests to minister in the Arizona territory. In the same year, Bourgade Catholic High School in west Phoenix opened. Several Bourgade buildings — the school's Madonna Hall, Hillman Center, and 100/200 wing buildings — are identical to former Gerard structures.

Its athletics mascot was the Redcoat. Its colors were red and gray. A board honoring Gerard's athletic history is installed in the lobby of the gymnasium at Seton Catholic Preparatory High School.

== Notable alumni ==
- Jeff Feagles, American football punter who won a National Championship while playing for the University of Miami, and played 22 seasons in the National Football League.
- Catherine Hicks, American actress known for her role as Annie Camden in TV series 7th Heaven. She was also in "Peggy Sue got Married" and "Star Trek the Voyage Home"
