= Sierra Summit Academy =

Public charter high school in Hereford, Arizona

Location
- 4200 E. Ramsey Road; Hereford, Arizona 85615; United States
- 31.4666°N 110.2518°W

Information
- School type: Public charter high school
- Established: 2001; 25 years ago
- Closed: 2011; 15 years ago
- Principal: Siamak Khadjenoury
- Grades: 8–12
- Enrollment: 44 at closure
- Colors: Black and yellow
- Mascot: Aztecs

Sierra Summit Academy was a charter school in Hereford, Arizona, near the larger town of Sierra Vista. The school opened in 2001 and closed in August 2011 due to losing its lease.

== Closure ==
In 2000, Sierra Summit academy began operations as a charter high school to serve the educational needs of the adolescents in treatment at VistaCare Residential Treatment Center located on 4200 E. Ramsey Rd in Hereford, AZ. In 2002, Vistacare secured accreditation through the coveted Northcentral Accreditation for schools as a private school. Due to requests from local parents, The management of Vistacare leased the 10 acre property adjacent to VistaCare RTC for the purpose of separating, relocating and operating Sierra Summit Academy as an Independent Charter High School. Modular buildings were purchased and installed on the sprawling property. The school offered seven Classrooms, a Technology lab complete with new computers, Library and administration offices. Native plants were donated by AZ State Department of Transportation and students and faculty planted them throughout the campus. Sierra Summit academy graduated tens of non-traditional students, many of whom may not have graduated if they had attended regular high schools. In August 2011, the founders also known as of Sierra Summit Academy returned the charter to AZ Charter board. On August 8, Arizona State Board for Charter Schools, the state regulator for such institutions, received an email from the board of directors of Sierra Summit Academy stating that due to the loss of location (mortgage payments were too high), the school had unexpectedly closed. The Founders also stated they were moving out of state and they were not interested in relocating the school to another location in the area. The Charter board granted the permission and released the board of any financial liabilities for disbursement of state funds. To date, the Founders continue to provide transcripts and support letters to its students and their families.
