= Gilbert Christian Schools =

Private school in Gilbert, Arizona

Location
- 1040 S Gilbert Road Ste 200; Gilbert, Arizona 85296; United States

Information
- School type: Private
- Religious affiliation: Christianity
- Established: 2009
- Superintendent: Jim Desmarchais
- Grades: K-12
- Enrollment: 1535
- Campuses: 4
- Colors: Green, Gold, and Black
- Mascot: Knights
- 01. High School Campus: 3632 E. Jasper Dr. Gilbert, Arizona 85296
- 02. K8 Agritopia Campus: 1424 S. Promenade Lane; Gilbert, Arizona 85296
- 03. K8 Greenfield Campus: 4341 S. Greenfield Rd. Gilbert, Arizona 85296
- 04. K8 Val Vista Campus: 22201 S Val Vista Dr; Gilbert, Arizona 85298
- Website: www.gilbertchristianschools.org

Gilbert Christian Schools is a system of private Christian schools in Gilbert, Arizona, United States. It includes 3 pre-K through middle school campuses, as well as a high school campus all at separate physical locations. The high school was founded in 2010. The Greenfield campus opened in August 2017 with over 300 students the first day. The Val Vista campus opened in 2023 with over 500 students the first day.

== History ==
The first school opened as Surrey Garden Christian School in 1996 with 14 students; it moved in 2002 to a new facility in Gilbert's Agritopia neighborhood. The next year, the school joined the Arizona Interscholastic Association for high school athletics; with just 50 high school students, it was the association's smallest full member school. After adding seven classrooms to the Agritopia campus to expand the high school in 2007, Surrey Garden changed its name to Gilbert Christian in 2009, after it parted ways with founder Tim Ihms, and was approved to build a separate high school campus to house up to 420 students.

In 2017, Gilbert Christian opened a third campus to house up to 540 K–8 students, alongside the Agritopia site.

== Athletic Championships ==
Basketball: The marquee sport for Gilbert Christian High School, having clinched multiple boys (2003, 2007, 2010, 2012, 2013, 2015, 2017) and girls (2009, 2011, 2014) state championships.

Soccer: Both boys and girls have recently added to the trophy case, with consecutive Boys 3A State Championships in 2024 and 2025, and a Girls 3A State Championship in 2023.

Beach Volleyball: The program has produced elite pairs, most notably winning back-to-back State Pairs Championships (2025) with collegiate-bound standouts.
