= Sonoran Science Academy =

Public school in Arizona, United States

Information
- Established: 2001; 25 years ago
- Grades: K-12
- Enrollment: 800
- Colors: Blue and Gold
- Mascot: Golden Eagle

Sonoran Science Academy-Tucson is a public charter school, managed by Sonoran Schools, a charter management organization. The main campus is located in Tucson, Arizona, with 6 total Sonoran Science Academy campus spread between Tucson and Phoenix, Arizona. The school opened in 2001 and is focused on STEM (science, technology, engineering, and mathematics) and college preparation.

The school serves 800 students in grades K-12.

== Information ==
The school colors are blue and gold. The mascot is the Golden Eagle.

== Accreditation ==
The school is accredited by AdvancED.

== History ==
Sonoran Science Academy Tucson is operated by the Daisy Education Corporation which began in 1999. The founding board members established the Daisy Education Corporation because of a shared belief that excelling in math and science would prepare America's youth to achieve success in college, the workplace, and the 21st century.

The founding members recognized that students in the United States were lagging behind their peers from other countries and that schools offering a rigorous, skill-level curriculum that focused on science, technology, engineering, and math (STEM) would provide the foundations to graduate independent thinkers who are capable of innovation and prepared to take leadership roles.

Sonoran Science Academy Tucson, initially called Daisy Science Academy, was opened in 2001, serving grades six through eight. The name of the school was changed the following year to Sonoran Science Academy and the school began adding grade levels each year until kindergarten through 12th grade were being served.

Sonoran Science Academy participates in regional, state, and national competitions, such as Intel ISEF, USAMO, FIRST Robotics Competition, National History Day, Academic Decathlon, MATHCOUNTS and Voice of Democracy.

Sonoran Science Academy has been noted for the extracurricular achievement of its students. In 2012 Stan Palasek became the first Arizona student since 2007 to be awarded First Place at the Intel International Science and Engineering Fair for his work in molecular evolution. In 2013 Augustus Woodrow-Tomizuka was recognized internationally with First Place at the Jacobs School of Music's international guitar competition. Students View Chivatanaporn from Sonoran Science Academy-Tucson (Arizona’s 1st Congressional District) and Nicholas Daniels from Sonoran Science Academy-Tucson (Arizona’s 3rd Congressional District) received numerous National Honors from The Congressional Awards Program for achieving certificate and medal requirements from years 2014-2017. View and Nicholas were the first Sonoran Science Academy-Tucson students to achieve these national honors while attending the school. In 2017 the school created an Academic Decathlon team that won 3rd place during the Arizona regionals, region III, with Javier Ramirez winning 1st in varsity math and 3rd in varsity essay, Abrielle Agron winning 3rd in honors math and speech, Jackson Durkin winning 3rd in scholastic economics, and Gregory Latherow winning 3rd in scholastic essay and math.

In 2016 and 2017, Pima County Supervisor Ally Miller today gave special recognition to the members of Sonoran Science Academy's FIRST Robotics team, CRUSH 1011, for winning the 2016 Colorado FIRST Robotics Team Award in Denver, Colorado and as 2017 FRC Houston World Champion. Supervisor Miller recognized CRUSH 1011 for their outstanding achievements by presenting them with a proclamation which declared the month of May as “STEM Education and CRUSH 1011 Robotics Team Appreciation Month.”

First Robotic Competition (FRC) Houston World Championship:

In April 2017, CRUSH competed with 400 teams at the FRC Houston FIRST World Championship. After a few rough matches on Thursday, CRUSH climbed in the ranks on Friday to end as the 8th seed. This was the first time CRUSH has been in the top 8 at the Championship. CRUSH was selected first overall to join FRC team 973 on the 1st seed alliance. Team 2928, and 5499 also joined our alliance. Our west coast alliance went undefeated in elimination matches, becoming Division Champions and advanced to Einstein Field. On Einstein, CRUSH had the opportunity to play against truly incredible teams, many of which have been consistent role models for CRUSH. In our 5 semi-final matches on Einstein, CRUSH won 3 matches and lost 2. Because of the alliance's high scoring average, we made it into the Einstein Finals. After two tough matches, CRUSH and our alliance of 973, Greybots, 2928, Viking Robotics, and 5499, The Bay Orangutans, were crowned the Houston World Champions (first team from Arizona to do so). CRUSH was truly honored to bring home the Championship win to our state, city, and school. CRUSH was the first FRC team from Arizona to win the Championship, and one of the few who have made it to Einstein. Much of our success is due to the teams who have inspired and supported us over our 15 year history, and none of it would have been possible without our sponsors and parents.
