= Arizona Agribusiness and Equine Center =

Chain of charter high schools in Arizona, US

The Arizona Agribusiness and Equine Center (AAEC) is a chain of public charter high schools focusing on early college students with concurrent enrollment in community college classes with tuition costs paid for by AAEC. The schools are located on college campuses in collaboration with Maricopa County Community College District and Yavapai Community College. The system was founded in 1997 with the establishment of the South Mountain campus. Since then, the chain has been expanded to incorporate five separate campuses, which are located within the Greater Phoenix Valley area and Prescott Valley.

In 2024, the Prescott Valley AAEC campus was named a Blue Ribbon School for High Performance by The U.S. Department of Education.

== Campuses ==
- Estrella Mountain (West Valley)
- Paradise Valley
- Prescott Valley
- Mesa
- South Mountain (South Phoenix)
- Online High School

== Controversies ==
In October 2025, Cory Kapahulehua, a former teacher at the AAEC Mesa campus, was sentenced to 187 years in prison after engaging in sexual misconduct with 2 underage students who he had met while working for the school.
