= Northern Yuma County Union High School =

Defunct high school in Arizona, United States

- Yuma County, Arizona; United States

Information
- Closed: Late 1950s
- Yearbook: La Reata

Northern Yuma County Union High School was the high school for northern Yuma County, Arizona (now La Paz County). It had branches in Parker and Salome by the mid-1950s. Both eventually were spun off into their own high schools, Parker High School and Salome High School, by the late 1950s. Parker kept the mascot, yearbook name (La Reata), and other traditions.
