= Mission Academy High School =

Coordinates: 33.453761°N 112.152593°W

Location
- 4301 W. Fillmore Street; Phoenix, Arizona 85027; United States

Information
- School type: Public charter high school
- Established: 2007
- Grades: 9-12

Mission Academy High School is a public charter high school in Phoenix, Arizona.

In 2012, Mission Charter Schools, the charter operator, entered into a partnership with Rite of Passage, the operator of Queen Creek's Canyon State Academy, under which ROP assists Mission with the operation of the school. A new campus location was selected to give the school space at the same time.
