= Superstition High School =

High school in Mesa, Arizona, US

Coordinates: 33.393692°N 111.610253°W

Location
- 10222 E. Southern Av. Mesa, Arizona 85208; United States

Information
- School type: Public alternative high school
- Principal: Joseph Brissette
- Grades: 9-12
- Colors: Maroon, gold
- Mascot: Bulldogs
- Website: superstition.mpsaz.org

Superstition High School is one of two alternative high schools operated by Mesa Public Schools. Superstition hosts 12-20 students per class.
