= Summit High School (Arizona) =

High school in Arizona, United States

Coordinates: 33.466089°N 112.063674°W

Location
- 728 E. McDowell Rd. Phoenix, Arizona 85006; United States

Information
- School type: Public charter high school
- Principal: Erik Fladager
- Grades: 9-12
- Enrollment: 190 (2023–2024)
- Colors: Navy blue, gray, white
- Mascot: Bulldogs
- Accreditation: North Central Association
- Information: 602.258.8959

Summit High School is a public charter high school in Phoenix, Arizona. It is operated by Leona Group Schools.
