= Palo Verde Christian High School =

Defunct high school in Tucson, Arizona

Palo Verde Christian High School was a Christian High School in Tucson, Arizona. It opened in 1986 and closed due to financial difficulties when it was bought out by the Catalina Foothills Church in 2000 and renamed Pusch Ridge Christian Academy. During the Palo Verde years the mascot was the Crusaders.

== History ==
The history of Palo Verde Christian High School dates back to December 22, 1958. On this date Charles William Egleston (1895–1965) and his wife Anna Kehr Egleston (1898–1997) donated 65 acres (260,000 m^{2}) of pristine desert property in the foothills of the Santa Catalina Mountains at the base of Pusch Ridge to Palo Verde Baptist Church of North Tucson. Mr. and Mrs. Egleston gifted Palo Verde their largest and most valuable real estate holding to be used "for religious and educational purposes only," with a firm vision that the property would support a school grounded in Christian values and faith.

The property was subdivided in late 1977 for the establishment of Canyon del Oro Baptist Church on the southern 16 acres (65,000 m^{2}) of the land. The other 49 acres (200,000 m^{2}) remained undeveloped through 1982, when Max Wilford, the president of the Palo Verde Christian School Board directed the commencement of construction on the Egleston property. Mr. Wilford desired to relocate Palo Verde Christian School from its location in Tucson to the property in Oro Valley.

In the fall of 1994, Palo Verde Christian School opened its doors on the Egleston property in Oro Valley. This new location was effectively the middle & high school, serving grades 6 through 12, while grades K through 5 remained at the Palo Verde Baptist Church property in Tucson. Due to financial difficulties, by early 2000, the school was struggling to remain solvent. It was at that time that the leadership of Catalina Foothills Church, PCA, desired to open a Christian high school. Ownership of the school transferred from Palo Verde Baptist Church to Catalina Foothills Church in early 2000.

Palo Verde Christian's enrollment stayed around 90 to 120 students up until the mid-1990s, but in its final four years, it had between 250 and 314 students.
