= Northwest Christian School =

Coordinates: 33.636505°N 112.147696°W

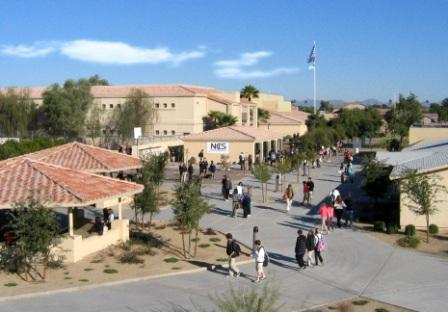

Location
- 16401 North 43rd Avenue; Phoenix, Arizona 85053; United States

Information
- School type: Independent school
- Established: 1980
- Superintendent: Geoff Brown
- Grades: Pre-K–12
- Enrollment: 472 high school students (Mar. 2026); 1,772 total
- Colors: Purple, Black, White
- Mascot: Crusaders
- Accreditation: Association of Christian Schools International; Cognia (education)
- Website: http://www.ncsaz.org/

Northwest Christian School is a private Evangelical Protestant school in Phoenix, Arizona, United States. The campus is located at 16401 North 43rd Avenue, northwest of downtown Phoenix. The mission of Northwest Christian School is to provide a Bible-based program of education that enables students to develop a Christian worldview. Northwest serves Preschool through high school students. The school's enrollment is 1,772.

== Athletics ==
In 2015, they lost in the Arizona State High School Football Championship to Pusch Ridge Christian Academy Lions.

In 2018, NCS's football team beat Yuma Catholic in the 3A state championship, in triple overtime.

In 2021, Northwest's girls soccer team had an undefeated season.

In 2025, Northwest's boys soccer team won the state championship against Yuma Catholic, after a hard fought 3-0 win, with a hat trick from Malachi Huisman.
