= Jess Schwartz Jewish Community High School =

Defunct Jewish high school in Arizona, United States

Coordinates: 33°36′10″N 111°55′32″W

Jess Schwartz Jewish Community High School was the college-preparatory high school of Jess Schwartz Jewish Community Day School, a defunct K-12 school in Scottsdale, Arizona. The high school's first classes were held in 2001, and its first seniors graduated in 2004. The high school had 65 students in 2010. It was a member of the National Association of Independent Schools (NAIS) and had been accredited by the North Central Association (NCA) of Schools and Colleges. The school had solely been a high school until 2009, when it merged with the colocated K-8 King David School to form a K-12 institution.

== Closure ==
The hard economy forced Jess Schwartz to reconsider its options. In 2010, it tried to refocus as a Hebrew-language charter school, which would drop grades 6-12 and be known as Jess Schwartz Academy. This ground to a halt because the Jewish community still wanted a day school. The school attempted to merge with one of Arizona's largest Jewish day schools, the 300-student, K-8 Pardes Jewish Day School in northeast Phoenix. The proposed Pardes JSA Community Day School planned to open in August 2011 with 325 K-8 students, but that came and went. Issues included a New York City foundation that gave money to the school to convert to the charter format and now is looking to recover the funds and the legal ramifications involved. As a result, Jess Schwartz Jewish Community Day School ceased to exist. The last classes were held at the Valley of the Sun Jewish Community Center in the former King David School campus. Shortly after its closure, former head of school Janice Johnson attempted to sue the school for financial compensation and wrongful termination.
