= Yavapai County High School =

Coordinates: 34°38′03″N 112°20′06″W

Location
- 7497 E. Addis; Prescott Valley, Arizona 86314; United States

Information
- School type: Public high school (alternative)
- School district: Yavapai County Accommodation District
- Superintendent: Tim Carter
- CEEB code: 030574
- Teaching staff: 3.00 (FTE)
- Grades: 9-12
- Enrollment: 30 (2023–2024)
- Student to teacher ratio: 10.00
- Colors: Yellow and purple
- Mascot: Eagle
- Website: www.yavapaicountyhighschool.com

Yavapai County High School is an accommodation high school in Prescott Valley, Arizona. Its operator, the Yavapai Accommodation School District, was established in 2001 to serve high school students.

Its current campus opened in the fall of 2004. It was built with $550,000 of funding from the Arizona School Facilities Board. Its listed capacity is 25 students.
