= Metro Tech High School =

Location
- 1900 West Thomas Road; Phoenix, Arizona; United States; 33°28′57″N 112°06′07″W

Information
- Type: Public secondary school
- Established: 1985; 41 years ago
- School district: Phoenix Union High School District
- NCES District ID: 0406330
- NCES School ID: 040633000539
- Principal: Shawna Wright
- Faculty: 118
- Teaching staff: 97.20 (FTE)
- Grades: 9-12
- Enrollment: 1,817 (2023-2024)
- Student to teacher ratio: 18.69
- Color
- Athletics: 5A
- Mascot: Knight
- Website: www.pxu.org/o/mths

Metro Tech High School is a high school that forms part of the Phoenix Union High School District in Phoenix, Arizona.

== History ==
The school occupies the site of the former West High School, which closed in 1983. The school opened in 1985 as Metro Tech Vocational Institute. The school received its current name in 1999, as it became a comprehensive high school, transitioning away from its beginnings as a vocational school that only focused on entry-level work skills.

== Student population ==
In the 2017-2018 school year, 1,797 students attended the school. 96.5% of the school's student population are identified as "Hispanic".

== Academics ==
The school's graduation rate in 2017 is 95%, while attendance rate is 94.8%. Students at the school are required to complete one or more of the 20 Career & Technical Education programs that are offered.

== Sports ==
In January 2016, Metro Tech's application for full membership with the Arizona Interscholastic Association was approved by its executive board. From 2016 to 2018, the school's team competes in the 4A Region 2 tier, along with teams at Cactus, Greenway, Moon Valley, Peoria and Sunrise Mountain high schools.
