= Girls Leadership Academy of Arizona =

Avance High School

Location
- 715 W. Mariposa; Phoenix, Arizona 85013; United States
- 33.508°N 112.082°W

Information
- School type: Public charter high school
- Established: August 2011
- Principal: Thomas Moreno
- Grades: 9-12
- Website: https://cplc.org/avance-high-school

Avance High School formerly Girls Leadership Academy of Arizona (GLAAZ), is a public charter high school in Phoenix, Arizona operated by Chicanos Por La Causa (CPLC). The school transitioned from an all-girls model to a coeducational format as part of its rebranding to Avance High School. It offers flexible learning options including credit recovery, online instruction, and in-person coursework, with a focus on college and career readiness.

The school was originally established as an all-girls charter high school and later transitioned to a coeducational program under the Avance High School name. Its facility is shared with the Florence Crittenton of Arizona nonprofit.
