= Parker High School (Arizona) =

High school in Arizona, United States

Coordinates: 34.1429°N 114.2879°W

Location
- 1600 South Kofa Avenue; Parker, (La Paz County), Arizona 85344; United States

Information
- Type: Public high school
- School district: Parker Unified School District
- Principal: David Daly
- Staff: 28.00 (FTE)
- Enrollment: 497 (2023-2024)
- Student to teacher ratio: 17.75
- Colors: Navy and Vegas gold
- Nickname: Broncs

Parker High School is a high school in Parker, Arizona. It is the only high school in the Parker Unified School District, which also includes one junior high, two elementary schools, and a primary school.

It was formerly known as Northern Yuma County Union High School.

Parker High School's volleyball team won the 3A state championship in 2007.

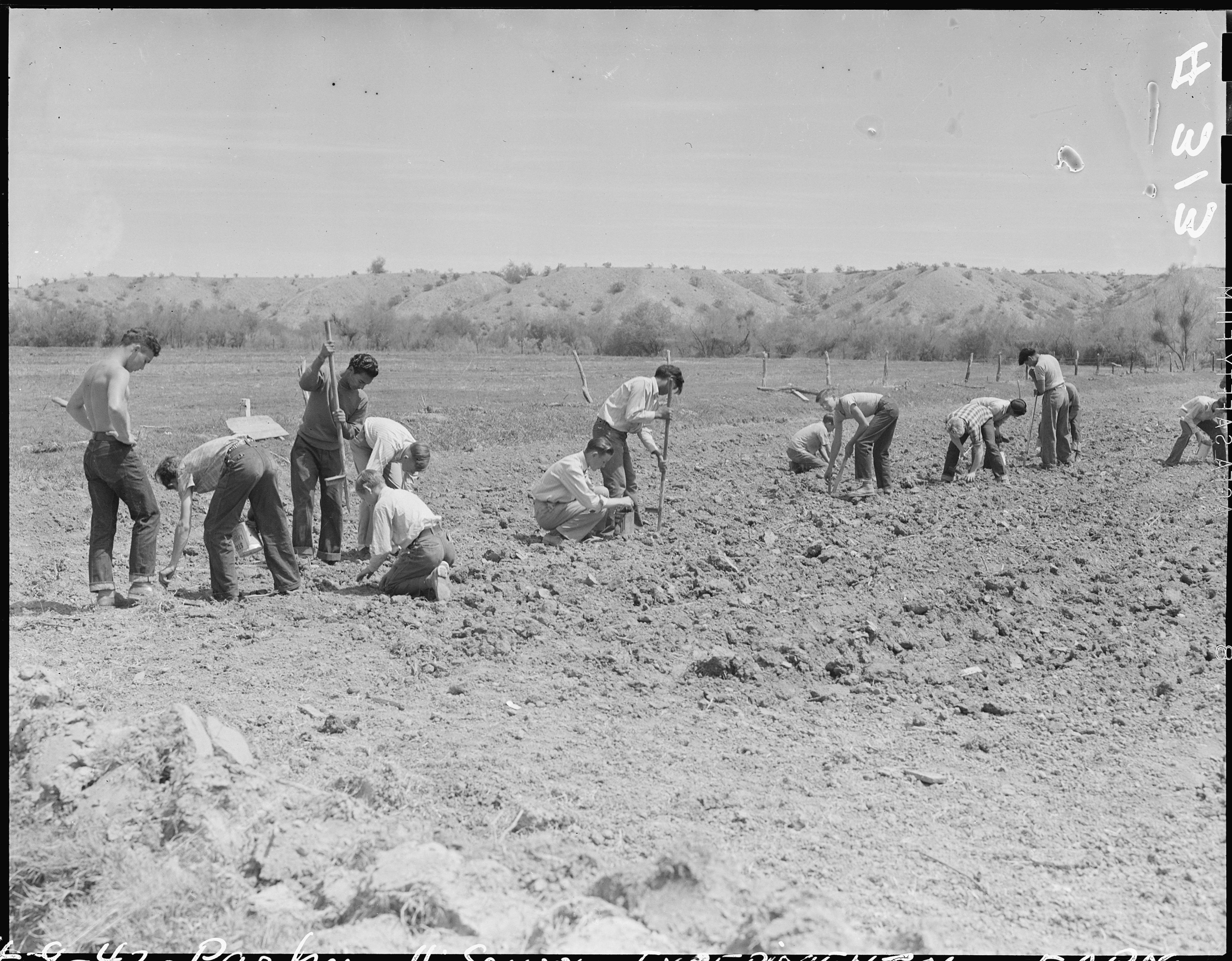
Parker High School students planting guayule at the Poston War Relocation Center on April 9, 1942
