= Hiaki High School =

Location
- 4747 West Calle Vicam; Tucson, Arizona 85757; United States
- Coordinates: 32°6′57″N 111°4′2″W

Information
- Type: Public charter high school
- Opened: 2005 (20 years ago)
- School district: Ombudsman
- Grades: 9–12
- Enrollment: 71 (Oct. 1, 2007)
- Mascot: Nahsuareo
- Website: www.pascuayaqui-nsn.gov/education/hiaki-high-school/

Hiaki High School is a public charter high school on the Pascua Yaqui Native American reservation in Tucson, Arizona. It is operated by Ombudsman Educational Services.
