= Pusch Ridge Christian Academy =

Private school in Tucson, Arizona

Coordinates: 32°20′51″N 111°00′26″W

Location
- 9500 N. Oracle Road, 6450 N. Camino Miraval; Tucson, Arizona 85704; United States

Information
- School type: Private Christian
- Established: February 2000 (26 years ago)
- CEEB code: 030492
- Principal: Jordan Raikes
- Principal: Brian Rafacz
- Principal: Mandy Rhodes
- Principal: Jonathon Basurto
- Headmaster: John Tyler
- Grades: K 12
- Enrollment: 700+ students for 2018–19
- Colors: Navy blue and Vegas gold
- Athletics conference: AIA 3A Conf.
- Mascot: Lions
- Accreditation: ACSI
- Website: www.prca.academy

Pusch Ridge Christian Academy is a private Christian school located in northwest Tucson, Arizona, on a 40 acres (160,000 m^{2}) campus. Pusch Ridge Christian Academy is a ministry of Catalina Foothills Church, PCA. The school is accredited by ACSI (Association of Christian Schools International).

== History ==
In 1958, Charles and Anna Egleston donated 65 acres (260,000 m^{2}) of pristine desert property in the foothills at the base of Pusch Ridge in the Catalina Mountains to Palo Verde Baptist Church, to be used "for religious and educational purposes only," with a firm vision that the property would support a school grounded in Christian values and faith. The property was subdivided in late 1977 for the establishment of Canyon Del Oro Baptist Church on the southern 16 acres. The other 49 acres (200,000 m^{2}) remained undeveloped through 1982, when Max Wilford, the president of the Palo Verde Christian School Board directed the commencement of construction on the Egleston property. Wilford intended to relocate Palo Verde Christian School from its location in Tucson to the property in Oro Valley. In the fall of 1994, Palo Verde Christian High School opened its doors on the property in Oro Valley. This new location served grades 6–12, while grades K–5 remained at the Palo Verde Baptist Church property in Tucson. By early 2000, the school was struggling and it was at that time that the leadership of Catalina Foothills Church, PCA, wanted to open a Christian high school. Through the leadership of David Mehl and other members, ownership of the school transferred from Palo Verde Baptist Church to Catalina Foothills in early 2000. In February 2000, Pusch Ridge Christian Academy was officially established.

The main entrance to the Pusch Ridge campus and Canyon Del Oro Baptist from North Oracle Road is named Egleston Memorial Drive in honor of Mr. and Mrs. Egleston, and North Egleston Drive runs just east of the nearby James D. Kriegh Park also honors the Eglestons.

Pusch Ridge currently has a K–12 enrollment of over 700 students.

== Athletics ==
The high school varsity girls basketball team, coached by Lonnie Tvrdy, won the Arizona state championship four years in a row from 2005 to 2008 but were eliminated from the championship in February 2009.

The high school varsity girls' cross-country team placed second at the 2011 State Meet at Cave Creek Golf Course for Division IV.

The Pusch Ridge baseball team, coached by former major league pitcher Doug Jones, won the Arizona 2A state championship in 2009.

Lions football has seen great success in their history, mainly with Bob Vance at the helm. They made the playoffs and went undefeated in regional play for three straight years. In the 2015 season the Lions won Division 4 state championships against Northwest Christian High School (Arizona).
