= Desert Hills High School (Arizona) =

Coordinates: 33.32325°N 111.75551°W

Location
- 1515 S. Val Vista Drive; Gilbert, Arizona 85296; United States

Information
- School type: Public charter high school
- Principal: Dave Miller
- Grades: 9-12
- Enrollment: 245 (2023–2024)
- Colors: Blue and Silver
- Mascot: Cougar
- Accreditation: North Central Association
- Website: www.deserthillshs.com

Desert Hills High School (DHHS) is a public charter high school in Gilbert, Arizona. It is operated by The Leona Group, which also operates other charter schools in Arizona, Florida, Ohio and Michigan.

As of 2012 Desert Hills inducted the National Business Honor Society program. It is the first charter school in the state to do so.
