= Immaculate Heart High School (Arizona) =

Secondary school in Pima County, Arizona

Location
- 625 East Magee Road; Oro Valley, Pima County, Arizona 85704; United States
- 32°21′9″N 110°57′45″W

Information
- Type: Private, coeducational
- Religious affiliations: Roman Catholic; Sisters of the Immaculate Heart of Mary
- Established: 1930 (96 years ago)
- Grades: 9–12
- Colors: Blue and white
- Team name: Knights
- Affiliation: North Central Association of Colleges and Schools, Western Catholic Education Association

Immaculate Heart High School is a private Catholic school in Oro Valley, Arizona (a suburb of Tucson). It is located in the Roman Catholic Diocese of Tucson. The high school is part of a larger campus that includes an elementary and middle school. However, the high school is governed by a Board of Managers consisting of community leaders and business people along with a president and principal. The elementary and middle schools are governed by a different president and principal and are independent of the IHHS Board of Managers. All three campuses are the focus and mission of the Sisters of the Immaculate Heart of Mary. The school bills itself as a small, close-knit campus with a focus on college preparatory curriculum.

== Background ==
In 1870 the Sisters of Saint Joseph from Los Angeles, California arrived in Tucson and opened a school called Saint Joseph's Academy. The academy's first location was next to St. Augustine Cathedral. The Sisters of Saint Joseph moved the academy to this site, on what is now 15th Street, in 1885. They instructed both Catholics and non-Catholics. During the early period most students came from Spanish and Mexican-American families. By 1931, the school had outgrown the building, and the diocese purchased another property known as Villa Carondelet in the foothills of the Rincon Mountains, east of downtown Tucson.

The religious institute of the Sisters of the Immaculate Heart of Mary was founded in Spain in 1848 by Father Joachim Masmitjá. In 1871 nine sisters journeyed to California to teach in several schools. In 1911, five sisters from Spain and two from California were sent to start a school in Mazatlán, Mexico. Six years later, in 1917, the sisters were forced to leave due to the Mexican Revolution. During a stop in their journey back to California, Bishop Henry Granjon of Tucson, Arizona invited the sisters to stay and they accepted. The IHM sisters taught in various locations before moving to the site of the former Saint Joseph's Academy.

== History ==
In 1930, the sisters established Immaculate Heart Academy at 35 E. 15th St. near downtown Tucson. It was a private boarding school for girls, built of stone harvested from "A" Mountain — a peak that sits on the outskirts of the city. Seventeen SIHMs originally staffed the school which taught grades K - 12. In 1962, the high school portion — to this day, the oldest continuously running Catholic high school in Tucson — moved to its present site in what is today Oro Valley in northwest Tucson. The former downtown academy on 15th Street was sold in the early 2000s and the site has been converted to loft apartments.

From 1963 until 1970, the secondary school was known as Immaculate Heart High School, but the name was changed to Suffolk Hills Catholic High School in 1971, and operated under that name until 1990. In 1990, the name was changed back to its original name of Immaculate Heart High School. In 1973, the school went co-ed. In 1987, the grade school moved to the northwest side of town, soon to be followed by the building of the middle school in 1994. All three campuses, within walking distance of each other, are now known collectively as Immaculate Heart Schools.

In 1988, the high school earned accreditation from North Central Association of Colleges and Schools as well as the Western Catholic Educational Association. In 1990, the name was changed back to its original name of Immaculate Heart High School, a coeducational school. It is accredited as a college preparatory high school and is a member of the National Catholic Educational Association, Washington, D.C. The school mascot is a Knight.

In late 2005, Immaculate Heart made known that it was in the process of developing a strategic plan to try to revive the high school campus. The sisters were successful in raising money for the school through various fundraising and capital improvement campaigns. A new school gymnasium was dedicated in November 2006.

In 2007, the high school initiated a strategic plan to increase enrolment to 250 in three to five years (enrolment in August 2007 was 64). The high school initiated a 3-5 year capital campaign, which included an increase in staffing to help increase enrolment, along with investing in cutting edge curriculum including Astrobiology and Virtual High School Netcourse, which open over 200 elective courses to IHHS students.

The Virgin Mary

== Campus ==
The neighborhood surrounding the school's campuses is known as Suffolk Hills, named for the countess of Suffolk, who was a frequent visitor to Tucson from England many decades ago. It is her estate the Sisters of the Immaculate Heart purchased. The property currently is used as an elementary school. The caretaker's building became the school office. Stables were converted to classrooms. The former multi-car garage now houses sixth-grade classes. The house itself is still home to four sisters.

== Structure ==
In July 2006, the Sisters of the Immaculate Heart of Mary approved a new model of management. This model is structured with a Board of Managers, a President and a Principal, to provide a business and strategic oversight. With the approval of this management structure, the president would focus on development, recruitment, marketing and strategic planning. The president also reports directly to the Board of Managers, and sits on the executive committee of the board along with several other committees including the Buildings and Grounds and Recruitment.

== See also ==
- List of high schools in Arizona
