= Phoenix Christian Preparatory School =

Private school in Phoenix, Arizona

Location
- 1751 W Indian School Road; Phoenix, Arizona 85015; United States
- 33°29′41″N 112°5′49″W

Information
- Type: private Christian
- Denomination: non-denominational
- Superintendent: Jeff Blake
- Teaching staff: 55 (on a FTE basis)
- Grades: PK-12
- Enrollment: 640 (plus 40 in pre-K) (2023-2024)
- Student to teacher ratio: 13.5
- Colors: Green and white
- Nickname: Cougars
- Accreditation: Association of Christian Schools International

Phoenix Christian Preparatory School is a private, non-denominational Christian school located in Central Phoenix. It was the first Christian high school in the state of Arizona when it was founded.

== History ==
Founded as Old Paths Christian School in 1912, the school was incorporated in 1949 as Phoenix Christian High School, it is a college preparatory. It moved to its current location on Indian School Road a couple of years later.

For most of its history, the school operated as a four year high school. Enrollment at the time was at about 400 to 450 students. In the early 1990s, the junior high school was added, and in 2003, the adjacent Light and Life grade school, previously operated by the Free Methodist church on 18th Avenue, was merged with the high school, forming one system known as Phoenix Christian Unified Schools.

== Demographics ==
The demographic breakdown of the 380 students enrolled in grades K-12 (NCES does not track demographic information for pre-K students) during the 2013–14 school year was:

- Native American/Alaskan - 0.5%
- Asian/Pacific islanders - 13.1%
- Black - 26.1%
- Hispanic - 29.2%
- White - 31.1%

== Notable alumni ==
- Steve Green, a gospel singer
- Beneth Alice Peters Jones, wife of Bob Jones III
- Tim Rattay, NFL quarterback
- Vonda Kay Van Dyke, 1965 Miss America
