= Spring Ridge Academy =

Defunct therapeutic boarding school in Arizona, United States

Location
- 13690 S Burton Rd; Mayer, Yavapai County, Arizona 86333; United States

Information
- School type: For-profit program, Therapeutic boarding school
- Opened: 1997
- Founders: Jean (Jeannie) Courtney
- Status: closed
- Closed: February 2023
- NCES District ID: 42
- CEEB code: 030422
- NCES School ID: A0900156
- Principal: Justin Zych
- Teaching staff: 11 (on an FTE basis)
- Gender: Girls
- Age range: 13-17
- Enrollment: 48
- Capacity: 76
  - Grade 9: 3
  - Grade 10: 11
  - Grade 11: 16
  - Grade 12: 18
- Student to teacher ratio: 4.4
- Hours in school day: 5.8
- Accreditations: Cognia (education)
- Tuition: $126,000 to $162,000 springridgeacademy.com

Spring Ridge Academy, was a Therapeutic boarding school for female adolescents 13–17 years old located in Mayer, Arizona, United States. It was founded 1996 and continued to operate until its permanent closure in 2023.

== Background ==
The campus was originally a house with a barn attached and only had one student. By the end, it was capable of housing up to 76 girls with a facility that included classrooms, medical areas, labs, and athletic fields and courts. Spring Ridge Academy was operated by Suzanne Courtney (Executive Director) at its time of closure.

== Programming ==
Spring Ridge Academy described itself as a "clinical therapeutic program with a college preparatory academic curriculum".

The program included four phases that each student completed at their own pace. The program's average length of stay was 14 to 18 months.

Parents or guardians who had their child admitted to Spring Ridge paid tuition and fees. Medical insurance may have covered part of the costs.

== Controversy ==
In 2021, the parent of a former resident filed a lawsuit against Spring Ridge Academy, alleging causes of action for negligence and fraud, amongst other things. The mother claims that the troubled teen program used non-evidence-based treatment practices on her daughter and misrepresented the tactics the program used before she enrolled her child there. In a large group awareness training workshop, for example, girls at Spring Ridge Academy were allegedly instructed to beat their chairs with rolled-up towels containing their anger while other students screamed at them.

In 2024, Spring Ridge Academy lost the fraud court case in Phoenix federal court, with the Jury awarding $2.5 million in punitive damages.

Other former students have claimed that the workshops at the center of the lawsuit are "abusive" and "shame-based." Former students say they had to participate in attack therapy as well.

Spring Ridge Academy has also been accused of using conversion therapy.

Other alumni have come forward alleging abuse as part of the Breaking Code Silence movement, describing the academy as a cult and as being exploitative of families. One Spring Ridge Academy alumnus was also featured in a Lifetime movie special Beyond the Headlines: Cruel Instruction, talking about the allegations of abuse in the troubled teen industry and the PTSD and anxiety that many survivors continue to live with. Spring Ridge Academy issued several in response to the Lifetime movie.
