= Scottsdale Christian Academy =

Location
- 14400 N. Tatum Blvd. Phoenix, AZ
- Coordinates: 33°37′04″N 111°58′44″W

Information
- Type: Private
- Established: 1968
- School district: NA
- Grades: Pre-kindergarten-12
- Enrollment: Approximately 1,000; 342 (high school: October 1, 2010)
- Color(s): Scarlet, white and navy blue
- Mascot: Eagle
- Website: Scottsdale Christian Academy

Scottsdale Christian Academy (SCA) is a K-12, private, non-denominational Christian school in Phoenix, Arizona, United States. It is accredited by AdvancEd and the Association of Christian Schools International.

Over 98% of Scottsdale Christian Academy graduates attend college immediately after graduation, and its graduation rate is 100%.

== Accreditation ==
All the school's K-12 teachers are fully degreed and certified through ACSI and/or the state.

SCA is AdvancEd and ACSI (Association of Christian Schools International) accredited through 2020.

== History ==
Scottsdale Christian Academy was founded by Scottsdale Bible Church in 1968, with an enrollment of only 47 students in first through fourth grade. In 1972, SCA became independent of Scottsdale Bible Church and became a non-profit organization. In 1973, the high school was added, and enrollment increased to 275 students. In 1991, the school moved to its current location, a 14-acre (57,000 m^{2}) campus on the southwest corner of Tatum and Acoma. Today, the school has approximately 900 students, and the high school alone has over 230 students.

=== Athletics ===
- Football (M)
- Basketball (M/W)
- Competitive cheer/pom (W)
- Tennis (M/W)
- Baseball (M)
- Fast-pitch softball (W)
- Cross country (M/W)
- Track and field (M/W)
- Swim (M/W)
- Soccer (M/W)
- Golf (M/W)
- Volleyball (M/W)
- Squash (M/W)

=== Dress code ===
In 1999, Scottsdale Christian started requiring their students to wear uniforms from a specific supplier. Now, students are able to buy clothes from any company. Shirts must have collars and must be a certain color. Shorts must be in a certain choice of colors. Skirts may be plaid or plain colors, but cannot be more than 4″ above the knee. The students may wear college or school sponsored t-shirts on Fridays.

== Notable alumni ==
- Ronan Kopp, Class of 2020, baseball player in the Los Angeles Dodgers organization
