= Thunderbird Adventist Academy =

Private high school in Scottsdale, Arizona

Location
- Scottsdale, Arizona; United States; 33°36′35″N 111°55′14″W

Information
- Type: Private high school
- Motto: Prepare for Life
- Religious affiliation: Seventh-day Adventist Church
- Established: 1920
- Principal: Michael Tomas
- Faculty: 30
- Enrollment: 152 (October 1, 2012)
- Colors: Royal blue and white
- Website: www.thunderbirdacademy.org

Thunderbird Adventist Academy (TAA) is a private Seventh-day Adventist Christian high school and boarding academy in Scottsdale, Arizona, United States. It is a part of the Seventh-day Adventist education system, the world's second largest Christian school system.

== History ==
In 1900, the Seventh-day Adventist Church created an elementary school in Phoenix. It expanded to include an intermediate school after several years. The need for an academy was becoming clear as more Seventh-day Adventists moved to Arizona. Finally, in 1920, Arizona Academy opened in northeast Phoenix with two dormitories and classes taught on the lower levels.

In 1953, the Seventh-day Adventist Church bought Thunderbird Field#2, an Army air base that included almost 600 acres of land, from the federal government. The school, now under its current name, moved to the former air base, and up until the 1970s and construction of new facilities, the school used the old Army buildings on site. Former hangars became a wood products industry and a vocational education center offering woodworking, welding and mechanics training, while the field itself was used to train missionary pilots. In 1963, to finance renovations, TAA commissioned an industrial park to surround the airport. In 1966, the city of Scottsdale bought the airfield.

== See also ==
- List of Seventh-day Adventist secondary schools
- Seventh-day Adventist education
