= University High School (Tolleson) =

College prep school in Tolleson, Arizona

Location
- 9419 W. Van Buren St. Tolleson, Arizona; United States; 33.448°N 112.264°W

Information
- Type: Public (magnet) secondary
- Established: 2006
- Oversight: Tolleson Union High School District
- Principal: Vickie Landis (Current), Susan Thompson (Former), Courtney Stevens (former)
- Teaching staff: 18.00 (FTE)
- Grades: 9–12
- Enrollment: 416 (2024-2025)
- Student to teacher ratio: 23.11
- Campus: Suburban
- Colors: Dark Green and Gold
- Mascot: Lighthouse
- Website: University High School

University High School (UHS) is an American public college preparatory high school located in the Tolleson Union High School District in Arizona. The school mascot is a lighthouse, and the colors that represent it are green and gold.

== History ==
University High School opened in 2006. It was founded by Dean and three co-founders. It is a shared campus with Tolleson Union High School, established in 1927. It is currently ranked #6 in Arizona according to US News in 2016, and is ranked #36 in America according to US News.

== Curriculum ==
All of the students at University High School take AP classes every year. The schedule of classes are all AP/advanced except for electives, which can be taken with Tolleson, or West-Mec. Advisory days are every Tuesday.

== Admission ==
Students that wish to attend can apply during 8th grade, after 9th/10th grade, or in special cases, 11th grade.
