= Gila Bend High School =

Public high school in Maricopa County, Arizona

Location
- 308 N. Martin Avenue; Gila Bend, Arizona 85337; United States; 32.951°N 112.717°W

Information
- School type: Public high school
- School district: Gila Bend Unified School District
- Principal: Jesus Rubalcava
- Staff: 10.00 (FTE)
- Grades: 9-12
- Enrollment: 187 (2023-2024)
- Student to teacher ratio: 18.70
- Colors: Blue and white
- Mascot: Gila Monster
- Information: 928.683.2225
- Website: Official website

Gila Bend High School is a high school in Gila Bend, Arizona under the jurisdiction of the Gila Bend Unified School District. It is a member of the CAA.
