= Arizona Cultural Academy =

Islamic school in Phoenix, Arizona, US

Location
- 7810 South 42nd Place; Phoenix, Arizona 85042; United States

Information
- Type: Private school
- Motto: "We are ACA. We empower our community with knowledge spirit and service."
- Established: 2001
- Teaching staff: 31.9 (on an FTE basis)
- Grades: PK-12
- Enrollment: 291 (inc. 47 PK) (2019-2020)
- Student to teacher ratio: 7.6
- Mascot: The ACA Wolf
- Nickname: Wolves
- Website: www.azacademy.org

Arizona Cultural Academy (ACA) is an Islamic private school located in southern Phoenix, Arizona. It is the second full-time Islamic school in the Phoenix Metropolitan Area, and as of 2007, has the highest enrollment figure among Islamic schools in Arizona. It is also the only Islamic school with a comprehensive K–12 program, the first graduates graduating in the Spring of 2006.

== History ==
In 1996, plans were set to build an Islamic school in the Valley. At the time, the only other full-time Islamic school in the city was Phoenix Metro Islamic School (PMIS), which operated from a facility in Tempe. The school was initially intended to open in North Phoenix but changed to the south Phoenix site. By August 2001, ACA was ready to begin classes with the completion of the first phase of its campus in south Phoenix.
