= Compadre Academy =

High School in Tempe, Arizona

Coordinates: 33°21′53″N 111°56′59″W

Information
- Former name: Compadre High School
- School district: Tempe Union High School District
- Mascot: Lobo

Compadre Academy or Compadre High School was a high school in the Tempe Union High School District in Tempe, Arizona. It functioned as an accelerated alternative high school designed for students seeking to complete their high school credits more quickly. Compadre Academy once consisted of two campuses due to one of the schools being under construction to add more facilities. As of the end of the 2024 school year, both sites were shut down. The Guadalupe location was repurposed as the professional development center and district office.

== Athletics ==
Compadre Academy's mascot was the Lobo.

== Partnership ==
In 2017, Tempe Union High School District entered into an agreement with Arizona State University to operate a charter school on the Compadre Academy campus, alongside the existing school. The new school, part of a network of the ASU Preparatory Academy charter schools operated by Arizona State University, was called ASU Prep Compadre High School. The school planned to admit 100 9th and 10th graders in its first year and planned to grow to 400 students.
