= Paradise Honors High School =

Coordinates: 33.599656°N 112.434729°W

Location
- 12775 N. 175th Avenue; Surprise, Arizona 85388; United States

Information
- School type: Public Honors high school
- Established: August 2008
- Principal: Gina Garcia
- Grades: 9-12
- Enrollment: 985 (2023–2024)
- Colors: Royal blue, black, white and silver
- Mascot: Panthers (Mustangs 2008-2011)
- Website: Official website

Paradise Honors High School is a high school in Surprise, Arizona. It is operated by Paradise Education Centers, an Arizona Honors holder that also runs an elementary and middle school.
