= Lourdes Catholic School =

Location
- 555 Patagonia Highway; Nogales, Santa Cruz County, Arizona 85621; United States; 31°23′16″N 110°52′20″W

Information
- Type: Private, coeducational
- Religious affiliation: Roman Catholic
- Established: 1934 (Sacred Heart School); 1940 (Our Lady of Lourdes Academy); 1986 (Our Lady of Lourdes High School); 1998 (unified)
- Oversight: Minim Daughters of Mary Immaculate
- CEEB code: 030236
- Principal: Sister Barbara Monsegur (high school); Sister Esther Hugues (elementary school)
- Grades: K–12
- Enrollment: High school: 67 (October 1, 2012)
- Colors: Navy blue and white
- Team name: Warriors
- Accreditation: North Central Association of Colleges and Schools
- Website: www.lcsnogales.org

Lourdes Catholic School is a private, Roman Catholic school in Nogales, Arizona, United States. It is located in the Roman Catholic Diocese of Tucson.

== Background ==
Lourdes Catholic is a bicultural, bilingual Catholic school founded in 1934. It began as the parochial Sacred Heart School, which was administered by the Minim Daughters of Mary Immaculate. In 1940, the sisters also established the Our Lady of Lourdes Academy, which served grades 4–6. The two schools were intertwined and joined by a third school in 1986, Our Lady of Lourdes High School, in response to demand from local parents. As a result of negotiations with the diocese in 1998 that aimed to privatize Sacred Heart School, the three schools unified as Lourdes Catholic School, an action confirmed by the unification of all three schools on one campus in 2001.
