= Desert Christian Schools (Arizona) =

Private school system in Tucson, Arizona, United States

Location
- 7525 E Speedway Blvd; Tucson, Arizona 85710; United States

Information
- School type: Private Christian School
- Motto: "Discipling young people to make a difference in their world!"
- Established: 1986 (40 years ago)
- Principal: Erin Thigpen (High School); Aaron Jansen (Junior High); Angela Alday (PS-6th)
- Headmaster: Dr. Jerry Bowen
- Grades: PK-12
- Enrollment: 564
- Colors: Royal Blue, Black, and White
- Mascot: Eagles
- Rivals: The Gregory School, Pusch Ridge Christian Academy, Blue Ridge High School, Phoenix Christian
- Accreditation: Association of Christian Schools International
- Website: www.desertchristian.org

Desert Christian Schools is a private Christian school system in Tucson, Arizona. Offering grades PS-12, it operates Preschool, elementary, middle and high schools.

== History ==
The high school was founded in 1986 in rented space at Christ Community Church, with 23 9th- and 10th-grade students and seven faculty members. It moved to the El Camino Baptist Church campus on East Speedway Boulevard in 1991 as its enrollment approached 100. It was expanded with a middle school in 2000 and elementary school in 2004. The high school and middle school moved from the El Camino campus to a location nearby, also on Speedway Boulevard, in 2001. In 2011, the elementary and middle schools moved to a purpose-built location on Wrightstown Road.
