= Yuma Catholic High School =

Catholic high school in Yuma, Arizona

Location
- 2100 West 28th Street; Yuma, Yuma County, Arizona 85364; United States; 32°40′36″N 114°38′41″W

Information
- Type: Private, coeducational
- Motto: Sapientia et Gratia (Wisdom and Grace)
- Religious affiliation: Roman Catholic
- Patron saint: Saint Isidore the Farmer
- Established: 2000 (26 years ago)
- Oversight: Roman Catholic Diocese of Tucson
- CEEB code: 030573
- Principal: Sherryl Gerber
- Grades: 9–12
- Enrollment: 380 (2016–17)
- Colors: Navy blue, old gold, and kelly green
- Mascot: Shamrock
- Accreditation: North Central Association of Colleges and Schools, Western Catholic Educational Association
- Website: www.yumacatholic.org

Yuma Catholic High School (YCHS) in Yuma, Arizona, United States, is a private Catholic high school that provides a college preparatory education. It is located in the Roman Catholic Diocese of Tucson.

== History ==
In 1998, the plans for Yuma Catholic High School were created. The school opened in August 2000.
