= Great Hearts Academies =

Charter school management organization

- Formation: 2003; 23 years ago
- Type: Non-profit Charter School Management Organization
- Location: Phoenix, Arizona, United States
- Website: www.greatheartsamerica.org

Great Hearts Academies is a non-profit charter school management organization that operates a network of elementary, middle, and high schools in the Phoenix, Arizona Metropolitan area; in San Antonio, Ft. Worth, Arlington, and Irving, Texas; and East Baton Rouge, Louisiana, with plans to open in Utah in Fall 2028.

Great Hearts Academies was founded in 2003. In the 2026–2027 school year, it enrolled over 31,000 students.

== History ==
=== Overview ===
Great Hearts Academies is a non-profit network of public charter schools in the United States. Its academic orientation is to a classical liberal arts education. In the 2026–2027 school year, it included 47 charter schools in three states (Arizona, Texas, and Louisiana), and served 31,000 students.

=== Founding and early years ===
Great Hearts Academies was established in 2003 by Dr. Daniel Scoggin, Jay Heiler, Bob Mulhern and a group of educators in Phoenix, Arizona. The founding vision was of a network of public charter schools that offered a classical liberal arts education.

Veritas Preparatory Academy, the first school in the network, opened in Phoenix in 2003.

=== Expansion ===
Great Hearts Academies initially expanded in Arizona. In 2011, Great Hearts Texas was founded. The first Texas campus, Great Hearts Monte Vista, opened in San Antonio in 2014. As of September 2026 the Great Hearts network included 24 schools in Arizona, 21 in Texas, and two in Louisiana.

== Curriculum and educational philosophy ==
The educational approach of Great Hearts is a classical liberal arts education. The curriculum focuses on a core reading list of Great Books called "Classics to Keep".

The elementary schools in the Great Hearts network are referred to as Archway campuses; they teach phonics, spelling, handwriting, and grammar as a part of their classical curriculum. They use the Core Knowledge curriculum (designed by E.D. Hirsch) for teaching chronological world history and American history and geography as well as studio art and music. They use Singapore Math as their math curriculum. All students study a language, which, depending on the specific school, is either Spanish, French, or Latin.

At the prep school level -- middle and high school -- students study literature and composition, humanities, laboratory sciences, and mathematics. Great Hearts only offers one common course of study, but students may select from language options including Spanish, French, Latin, and Greek, depending on the school.

Great Hearts Academy graduates proceed immediately to college or university at a rate of 98 percent, with 51 percent pursuing STEM (Science, Technology, Engineering and Mathematics) courses of study. Great Hearts students achieve SAT scores that are 220 points higher than the national average.

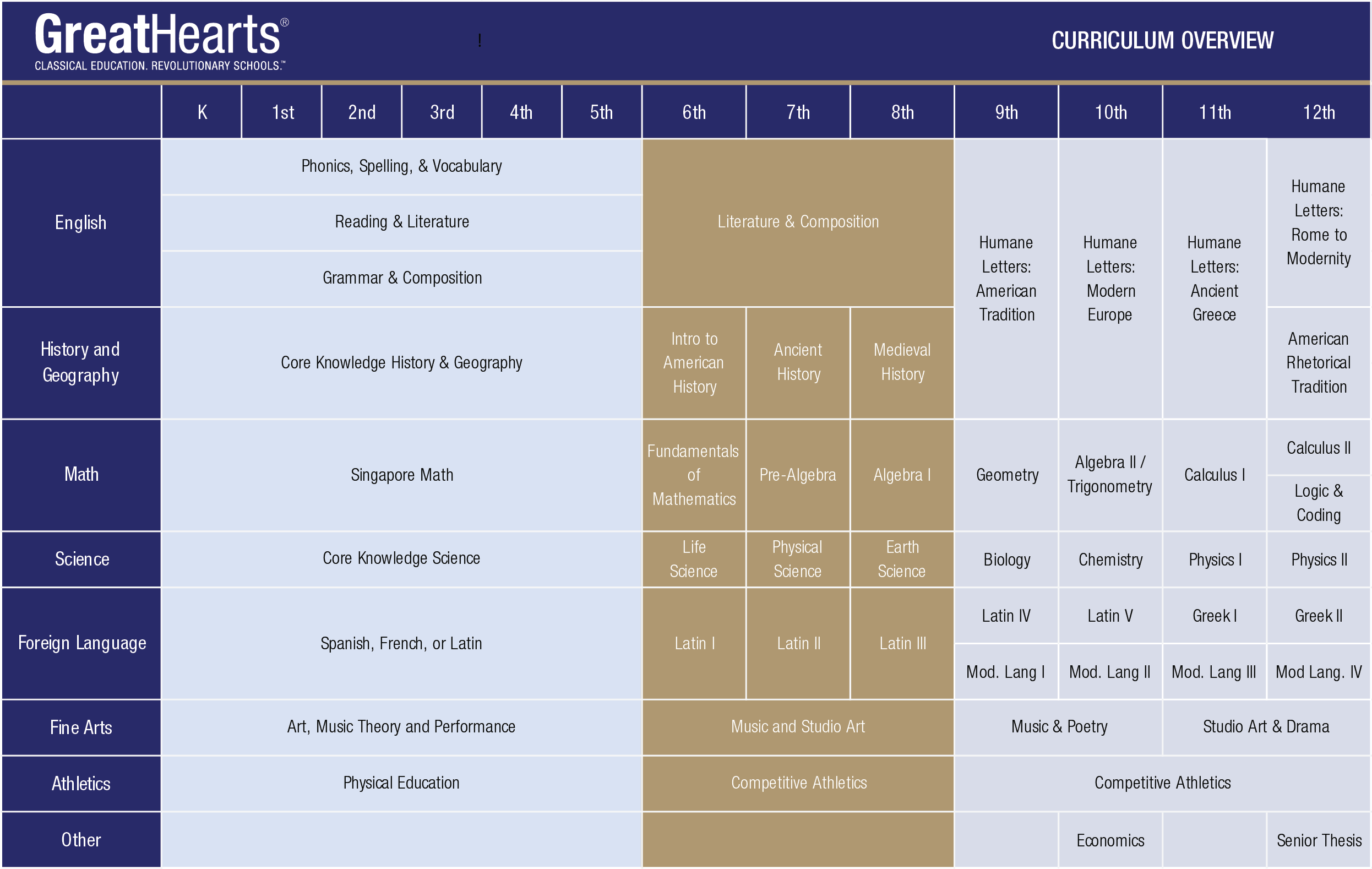
An overview of Great Hearts Academies curriculum from Kindergarten through 12th Grade

== Extracurricular activities ==
Great Hearts Academies offers extracurricular activities, including athletics, fine arts, and various clubs. Students are encouraged to participate in these programs to develop a well-rounded education and foster personal growth.

== Academics ==
According to 2021–22 academic performance data from Arizona State Board of Education, Great Hearts Arizona ranked as the highest performing public school system in the Phoenix metro area. In the 2022 Arizona Academic Standards Assessments (AASA), Great Hearts Arizona's 22 schools collectively outperformed every other district and charter network in Phoenix with an aggregate rating of 88.9.

Archway Classical Academy Lincoln, a Great Hearts school, was the highest ranked school in the state with a score of 104.47.

In the 2021–22 school year, Great Hearts Texas was awarded an A-Grade from the Texas Education Agency.

Analysis by Stanford University's CREDO program identified Great Hearts Academies as a large charter network having a positive impact on student achievement.

== Academies ==
As of September 2026, Great Hearts Academies operated 47 schools across Arizona, Texas, and Louisiana. One of these is an online charter academy. Great Hearts also operates preschools - known as Young Hearts - in Arizona.

List of schools affiliated with Great Hearts

=== Arizona ===
1. Archway Classical Academy Anthem

2. Archway Classical Academy Arete

3. Archway Classical Academy Chandler

4. Archway Classical Academy Cicero

5. Archway Classical Academy Glendale

6. Archway Classical Academy Lincoln

7. Archway Classical Academy Maryvale

8. Archway Classical Academy North Phoenix

9. Archway Classical Academy Roosevelt

10. Archway Classical Academy Scottsdale

11. Archway Classical Academy Trivium

12. Archway Classical Academy Veritas

13. Anthem Preparatory Academy

14. Arete Preparatory Academy

15. Chandler Preparatory Academy

16. Cicero Preparatory Academy

17. Glendale Preparatory Academy

18. Lincoln Preparatory Academy

19. Maryvale Preparatory Academy

20. North Phoenix Preparatory Academy

21. Roosevelt Preparatory Academy

22. Scottsdale Preparatory Academy

23. Trivium Preparatory Academy

24. Veritas Preparatory Academy

=== Texas ===
1. Great Hearts Arlington Lower School

2. Great Hearts Arlington Upper School

3. Great Hearts Forest Heights Lower School

4. Great Hearts Forest Heights Upper School

5. Great Hearts Invictus Lower School

6. Great Hearts Invictus Upper School

7. Great Hearts Irving Lower School

8. Great Hearts Irving Upper School

9. Great Hearts Lakeside Lower School

10. Great Hearts Lakeside Upper School

11. Great Hearts Live Oak Lower School

12. Great Hearts Live Oak Upper School

13. Great Hearts Monte Vista North

14. Great Hearts Monte Vista South

15. Great Hearts Northern Oaks Lower School

16. Great Hearts Northern Oaks Upper School

17. Great Hearts Prairie View Lower School

18. Great Hearts Prairie View Upper School

19. Great Hearts Western Hills Lower School

20. Great Hearts Western Hills Upper School

21. Great Hearts Texas Online

=== Louisiana ===
1. Great Hearts Harveston Lower School

2. Great Hearts Harveston Upper School

== Impact and plans ==
Great Hearts Academies has gained national recognition for its educational successes. The network's schools consistently rank highly in both state and national rankings, with a high percentage of students achieving top scores on standardized tests and gaining admission to prestigious colleges and universities.

Great Hearts Academies plans to expand in existing and new regions.

== Controversies ==
=== Policy on transgender students ===
In June 2016, the Great Hearts corporate Board of Directors adopted a policy that requires their transgender students to align all school activities with their biological sex, rather than the student's gender identity. The student's participation in extracurricular clubs, sports, and the use of facilities such as restrooms all must align with the sex of the student as printed on his or her birth certificate. This requirement extends further to Great Hearts' gendered hair cutting standards, school uniform requirements, "girls line/boys line" classroom management, and daily pronoun usage.

Great Hearts' policy on transgender students is strongly opposed by local LGBT organizations and transgender advocates. Opponents to the policy argue that Great Hearts has chosen to ignore clear guidance from the medical and psychological communities regarding how best to support their transgender student population.

Great Hearts argues that, since the civil rights of the transgender population is not yet a matter of settled law in the United States, the Board of Directors will define school policy in line with current statutory guidance and use the birth certificate as the official document that defines a student's gender.

=== Haircut standards ===
In February 2018, Teleos Preparatory Academy in Phoenix, part of the Great Hearts charter school system, notified one of their students that his hairstyle did not conform to the school's policy standard. The child's family argued that he was targeted because he was not white. Great Hearts responded with a statement reinforcing their policy of no braided hair on boys and that Great Hearts was "sorry to see this family leave the Teleos Prep community... we fully respect their decision to do so."

The Arizona chapter of the ACLU together with Black Mothers Forum, a local advocacy organization, called on Great Hearts to eliminate their grooming standards. Eight days later, Great Hearts offered to make a policy exception and readmit the family. The family refused.

=== Homework assignment on slavery ===
In April 2018, Great Hearts apologized after one of their teachers in Texas assigned homework in which students were to list the pros and cons of being a slave. Social media spread the story of the homework assignment nationwide, sparking outrage. In response, Great Hearts issued a statement condemning the homework assignment.

Although the same homework assignment had been given in the past, the teacher who gave the assignment was reprimanded and briefly placed on leave. He was reinstated after remedial training was complete.
