= Arizona Interscholastic Association =

Regulatory body for high school athletics

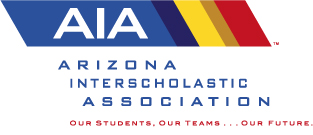

- Abbreviation: AIA
- Formation: 1913 (1925 in current form)
- Legal status: Association
- Purpose: Athletic/Educational
- Headquarters: 7007 North 18th St. Phoenix, AZ 85020
- Region served: Arizona
- Members: 266 schools
- Executive Director: Jim Dean
- Affiliations: National Federation of State High School Associations
- Staff: 18
- Website: aiaonline.org

The Arizona Interscholastic Association (AIA) is one of two regulatory bodies for high school athletics and activities in the U.S. state of Arizona. It comprises all of the state's public district high schools (except Ajo High School, Beaver Dam High School and Gila Bend High School), various charter and private schools, plus a full member in Winterhaven, California and an associate member in Nogales, Sonora, Mexico. The AIA has 264 members, including 262 full members (Rincon/University are one team and Bowie/San Simon are one team) and 2 associate members. Its associate members are BASIS Chandler and Colegio Gante.

The AIA is not the only high school sports regulatory body in Arizona. The Canyon Athletic Association (CAA) coordinates events for smaller schools, especially charter schools, but the AIA is the largest.

== See also ==
- NFHS
