= SHS =

SHS may refer to:

== Organisations ==
- SHS (football club), Dutch football club
- School-Home Support, a British children's charity
- Scottish History Society
- Shiv Sena (1966–2022), an Indian political party
- Socialist History Society
- Society for Health Systems
- Swiss Heritage Society
- SHS Group, a beverage company which owns the Merrydown brewery
- SHS International, a medical nutrition products company
- Jingzhou Shashi Airport, China (IATA code SHS)

== Places ==
- Sheung Shui station, Hong Kong; MTR station code SHS
- Jingzhou Shashi Airport, China (IATA code SHS)
- Kingdom of SHS (1918–1929), a kingdom of Serbs, Croats and Slovenes

== Technology ==
- The file extension for Shell Scrap Object Files produced by Microsoft Windows
- Secure Hash Standard
- Self-propagating high-temperature synthesis
- Solar Home Systems – commonly referred as SHS in rural electrification
- Square Hollow Section; see Structural steel
- Structural Hollow Section; see Structural steel

== High schools ==
=== Multiple high schools with the same name ===
- Salem High School (disambiguation)
- Saline High School (disambiguation)
- Salisbury High School (disambiguation)
- Seminole High School (disambiguation)
- Shaw High School (disambiguation)
- Shawnee High School (disambiguation)
- Sheldon High School (disambiguation)
- Sherwood High School (disambiguation)
- Silverado High School (disambiguation)
- Skyline High School (disambiguation)
- Skyview High School (disambiguation)
- Socorro High School (disambiguation)
- Somerville High School (disambiguation)
- Southridge High School (disambiguation)
- Southside High School (disambiguation)
- Spaulding High School (disambiguation)
- Springfield High School (disambiguation)
- Springville High School (disambiguation)
- Sterling High School (disambiguation)
- Stevens High School (disambiguation)
- Stratford High School (disambiguation)
- Sutton High School (disambiguation)

=== In the United States ===
- Jesse O. Sanderson High School, Raleigh, North Carolina
- Muncie Southside High School, Muncie Indiana
- Pittsford Sutherland High School, Rochester, New York
- Safford High School, Arizona
- Sahuaro High School, Tucson, Arizona
- Salida High School, Colorado
- Saraland High School, Alabama
- Sammamish High School, Bellevue, Washington
- Sandusky High School, Ohio
- Sanford High School, Maine
- Saugus High School (California), Santa Clarita, California
- Scarsdale High School, New York
- Schaumburg High School, Illinois
- Seagoville High School, Dallas, Texas
- Seaholm High School, Birmingham, Michigan
- Seaman High School, Topeka, Kansas
- Sebeka High School, Minnesota
- Seekonk High School, Massachusetts
- Sehome High School, Bellingham, Washington
- Senn High School, Chicago, Illinois
- Service High School, Anchorage, Alaska
- Seven Hills School, Cincinnati, Ohio
- Sewanhaka High School, Floral Park, New York
- Sharyland High School, Mission, Texas
- Sherando High School, Frederick County, Virginia
- Shortridge High School, Indianapolis, Indiana
- Sitka High School, Alaska
- Skyridge High School, Lehi, Utah
- Snohomish High School, Washington
- Soldotna High School, Alaska
- Souhegan High School, Amherst, New Hampshire
- Southaven High School, Mississippi
- Southmoore High School, Moore, Oklahoma
- Southwood High School, Shreveport, Louisiana
- Spencerport High School, Rochester, New York
- Springboro High School, Ohio
- Springbrook High School, Silver Spring, Maryland
- Stafford High School (Stafford, Texas)
- Stafford Senior High School, Falmouth, Virginia
- Stamford High School (Stamford, Connecticut)
- Staples High School, Connecticut
- Stansbury High School, Stansbury, Utah
- Stanwood High School, Washington
- Statesboro High School, Georgia
- Steinbrenner High School, Lutz, Florida
- Stevenson High School (Lincolnshire, Illinois)
- Stow-Munroe Falls High School, Ohio
- Stranahan High School, Fort Lauderdale, Florida
- Streamwood High School, Illinois
- Sturgis High School, Michigan
- Suffern High School, New York
- Sullivan High School, Indiana
- Sultan Senior High School, Washington
- Suncoast Community High School, Florida
- Sunnyvale High School, Texas
- Superior High School (Wisconsin)
- Syosset High School, New York
- Sunset High School (Beaverton, Oregon)

=== Outside the United States ===
- Sackville High School, Nova Scotia, Canada
- Sacred Heart School (Bahrain), Isa Town, Bahrain
- Sacred Heart National Secondary School, Sibu, Sarawak, Malaysia
- Sagano High School, Kyoto City, Kyoto, Japan
- Sanderson High School, East Kilbride, South Lanarkshire, Scotland
- Sattari High School, West Bengal, India
- Selby High School, North Yorkshire, England
- Selwyn House School, Montreal, Quebec, Canada
- Shanghai High School, China
- Sheffield High School, South Yorkshire, England
- Shepparton High School, Victoria, Australia
- Sherburn High School, North Yorkshire, England
- Shrewsbury High School, Shropshire
- Southborough High School, Surbiton, Greater London, England
- Springhill High School, Rochdale, Greater Manchester, England
- Stourport High School, England
- Stroud High School, Gloucestershire, England
- Stuttgart High School (Germany), Baden-Württemberg, Germany
- Sudbury High School, Ontario, Canada
- Sunderland High School, Tyne and Wear, England
- Suzhou High School, Jiangsu, China
- Sydney Boys High School, Australia

== Other uses ==
- Sarah Huckabee Sanders (born 1982), governor of Arkansas and former White House Press Secretary
- Stephanie Herseth Sandlin (born 1970), former U.S. Congresswoman from South Dakota
- Secondhand smoke
- Yamaha SHS-10, a musical keyboard
- Marvel Super Hero Squad, an action figure line
  - Marvel Super Hero Squad (video game), based on the action figures
  - The Super Hero Squad Show, based on the action figures
- Structural hollow section, a construction member type (or square hollow section, a specific type)
