= Canyon Athletic Association =

High school sports association in Arizona

The Canyon Athletic Association (CAA), previously known as the Arizona Charter Athletic Association, is an American non-profit regulatory organization for athletic competition among secondary schools located in Arizona. The CAA serves small non-traditional education institutions including charter schools, public schools, home school organizations, and parochial schools. As of 2014, the CAA membership consisted of approximately 125 High Schools and Junior High Schools.

The CAA is not affiliated with the Arizona Interscholastic Association which also regulates high school sports in Arizona. Most schools within the CAA are smaller than schools within the AIA.

== Members ==
=== High schools ===
- Academy of Building Industries
- Academy with Community Partners
- Adobe Mountain School
- Ajo High School
- Alta Vista High School
- American Leadership Academy
- Anthem Preparatory Academy
- Arrowhead Christian Academy (Glendale)
- AZ Compass Preparatory School
- BASIS Chandler
- BASIS Mesa
- BASIS Peoria
- BASIS Phoenix
- BASIS Scottsdale
- Berean Academy
- Cambridge Preparatory Academy
- Canyon View Preparatory Academy
- Champion Schools
- Copper Point Schools
- Crestview College Preparatory High School
- Canyon State Academy
- Desert Garden Montessori
- Desert Heights Athletics
- East Valley Athletes for Christ
- EdOptions High School
- Eduprize Gilbert Charter School
- El Dorado High School
- Estrella High School
- Foothills Academy
- Genesis Academy
- Gila Bend High School
- Gilbert Early College
- Girls Leadership Academy of Arizona
- Glenview College Prep High School
- Grand Canyon Preparatory Academy
- Harvest Preparatory Academy
- Heritage Academy - Laveen at Salt River High School
- Heritage Academy - Mesa
- Heritage Academy - Queen Creek
- Hillcrest Academy
- Imagine Prep at Superstition
- Imagine Prep at Surprise
- James Madison Preparatory School
- Jefferson Preparatory High School
- Leading Edge Academy
- LFPA Gilbert
- Maya High School
- Mission Heights Preparatory High School
- New Way Academy
- North Phoenix Preparatory High School
- NFL YET Academy
- Orme School
- Our Lady of Sorrows Academy
- Pan-American Charter School
- Paradise Valley Christian Preparatory
- Paragon Science Academy
- Peoria Accelerated High School
- Phoenix College Preparatory Academy
- Phoenix Collegiate Academy
- Phoenix School of Academic Excellence
- Polytechnic High School
- Precision High School
- Ridgeline High School
- Salt River High School
- Sequoia Charter School
- Sequoia Pathway Academy
- Skyline Prep High School
- Sonoran Science Academy
- South Pointe High School
- South Ridge High School
- Southgate Academy
- Southwest Leadership Academy
- Starshine Academy
- Summit High School
- Tri-City Christian Academy
- Tri-City College Prep
- Trinity Christian School
- Ville de Marie Academy
- West Phoenix High School
- Western School of Science &Technology
- Westwind Preparatory Academy
- Wickenburg Christian Academy
- Verde Valley School

=== Junior high schools ===
- Arrowhead Christian
- Academia Del Pueblo
- Academy Math / Science
- Academy Del Sol
- Ajo
- American Leadership
- ASU Prep (Phoenix)
- ASU Prep (Poly)
- Athlos Academy
- AZ Academy of Science
- AZ Compass
- BASIS Ahwatukee
- BASIS Chandler
- BASIS Mesa
- BASIS Peoria
- BASIS Phoenix
- Benjamin Franklin
- Bios Christian
- CFA - Phoenix
- Calibre Academy
- Cambridge Queen Creek
- Camelback Academy
- Candeo - Peoria
- Carden of Tucson
- Caurus Academy
- Copper Canyon
- Desert Garden Montessori
- Desert Heights
- Destiny Globe
- Dobson Academy
- Eagle Prep
- Eduprize Gilbert
- Eduprize Queen Creek
- Empower
- EVAC
- Foothills Academy
- George Gervin
- Gila Bend
- Gilbert Early College
- Grand Canyon Prep
- Hearn Academy
- Heritage Academy
- Heritage Elementary
- Imagine Camelback
- Imagine Coolidge
- Imagine Cortez Park
- Imagine Desert West
- Imagine East Mesa
- Imagine Superstition
- Imagine Surprise
- Imagine West Gilbert
- La Paloma - Central
- La Paloma - Lakeside
- LEA - Maricopa
- Leading Edge
- Legacy - Avondale
- Legacy - Casa Grande
- Legacy - Gilbert
- Legacy - Laveen
- Legacy - Maricopa
- Legacy - NW Tucson
- Legacy - Queen Creek
- Liberty Arts
- Math & Science Success
- Mosaica Prep
- New Way Learning Acad.
- NFL Yet
- Paradise Education
- Pathway Academy
- Patriot Academy
- PCA
- Phoenix Advantage
- Pioneer Prep
- PVC
- Quest
- Ridgeline Academy
- Sabis International
- San Tan Charter School
- Science Success
- Sequoia
- Skyline Gila River
- South Pointe
- South Valley
- Starshine
- Tri-City Christian
- Vista Grove
- Wickenburg Christian
