= SRHS =

SRHS may stand for:

- Salt River High School
- Sam Rayburn High School
- Sanborn Regional High School
- San Rafael High School
- School of Related Health Sciences
- Scripps Ranch High School
- Sebastian River High School
- Sharon Regional Health System
- Shelburne Regional High School
- Shore Regional High School
- Slippery Rock High School, a high school in Slippery Rock Area School District
- South River High School (Maryland)
- South River High School (New Jersey)
- Southern Regional High School
- Spanish River Community High School
- Spartanburg Regional Healthcare System
- Sto-Rox High School
- Southridge High School (disambiguation)
- Sussex Regional High School
