= Kerry Taylor (American football) =

American football player and coach (born 1989)

No. 18, 13
- Position: Wide receiver

Personal information
- Born: February 20, 1989 (age 37); Chandler, Arizona, U.S.
- Listed height: 6 ft 0 in (1.83 m)
- Listed weight: 200 lb (91 kg)

Career information
- High school: Hamilton (Chandler, Arizona)
- College: Arizona State
- NFL draft: 2011: undrafted

Career history
- Green Bay Packers (2011)*; New England Patriots (2011)*; San Francisco 49ers (2011)*; Minnesota Vikings (2011–2012)*; New England Patriots (2012)*; Arizona Cardinals (2012–2013); Jacksonville Jaguars (2013–2014); Dallas Cowboys (2014)*; Denver Broncos (2015)*
- * Offseason or practice squad member only

Career NFL statistics
- Receptions: 22
- Receiving yards: 229
- Receiving touchdowns: 1
- Stats at Pro Football Reference

Kerry Lee Taylor (born February 20, 1989) is a former professional football wide receiver and high school coach. In college he played for Arizona State University and in high school for Hamilton High School in Chandler, Arizona.

== College career ==
Taylor verbal commitment to Arizona State University as part of Dirk Koetter's 2007 recruiting class bring along teammate Colin Parker from perennial power Hamilton High School in Chandler, Arizona. Online college recruitment service Scout listed him as the 4th best prospect in Arizona and the 22nd best wide receiver nationwide. When Koetter was fired before the 2007 season and Denis Erickson hired, Taylor honored his verbal commitment to ASU by signing a letter of intent.

Arizona State University Statistics
Year	GS	G	Rec.	Yds.	Avg	TD	Lg	Avg/G
2007	0	13	8	53	6.6	1	11	4.1
2008	6	12	27	405	15.0	3	52	33.8
2009	8	9	23	276	12.0	0	29	30
2010	6	12	54	699	12.9	3	54	58.3
Career	20	46	112	1433	12.8	7	54	31.2

While at ASU, Taylor sought and completed a bachelor's degree in Interdisciplinary Studies with a Sociology and Communications. As his collegiate career ended, Taylor addressed Erickson's staffing decisions to a television audience as, “helping out his buddies.” He further explained, "We all know this is Erickson's last stint in coaching. He is just trying to get some of his buddies one last paycheck," due to poor offensive schemes and lackluster overall performance.

== Professional career ==
Taylor declared for the 2011 NFL draft but was not selected by any team therefore making him an undrafted free agent. Only the Arizona Cardinals and Jacksonville Jaguars promoted Taylor from practice squads during regular season play.

=== Green Bay Packers ===
After going undrafted in the 2011 NFL draft, Kerry Taylor signed with the Green Bay Packers on July 28, 2011. He played in four preseason games with the team where he caught a combined seven passes for 56 yards and one touchdown. He was released on September 3, 2011.

=== New England Patriots ===
Taylor shortly thereafter signed to the practice squad of the New England Patriots on September 5. He was subsequently released on September 16.

=== San Francisco 49ers ===
On October 12, 2011, Taylor was signed to the practice squad for the San Francisco 49ers. He was released six days later on October 18.

=== Minnesota Vikings ===
Taylor was signed to the practice squad Minnesota Vikings on October 26 after receiver Stephen Burton was signed to the 53-man roster.

=== New England Patriots ===
After being waived by the Vikings, Taylor was claimed by the New England Patriots on August 27, 2012.

=== Arizona Cardinals ===
He was promoted to the active roster from the practice squad by the Arizona Cardinals on December 26, 2012.

=== Jacksonville Jaguars ===
On November 4, 2013, the Jacksonville Jaguars signed Taylor off the Cardinals practice squad. He scored his first NFL touchdown on December 29 in a game against the Indianapolis Colts on a 14-yard pass from quarterback Chad Henne.

He was released on August 30, 2014, and signed to the team's practice squad the next day. He was promoted to the active roster on September 20. He was released on September 23 and re-signed to the practice squad the next day. He was waived from the practice squad on October 7.

=== Dallas Cowboys ===
On October 9, 2014, the Dallas Cowboys signed Taylor to their practice squad. He was released on November 30 to make room for WR Chris Boyd.

=== Denver Broncos ===
On January 15, 2015, the Denver Broncos signed Taylor to a reserve/future contract for the 2015 season. He was waived on April 23, 2015.

== Coaching ==
=== Chandler High School ===
Directly following his retiring from the NFL, Taylor joined the football coaching staff at Chandler High School in Chandler, Arizona for only the 2015 season where his brother Kolby Taylor was a junior wide receiver.

=== Salt River High School ===
Taylor's first high school head coaching position was at Salt River High School in Scottsdale, Arizona, a member school of the Canyon Athletic Association (CAA) which is a sister organization to the Arizona Interscholastic Association (AIA). He would dually work at Phoenix College as passing game coordinator.

=== Arcadia High School ===
In 2018, Taylor first head coaching of an AIA member school was at Arcadia High School in Phoenix, Arizona, in the 4A conference. The team, which was on a 16-game losing streak was guided to a 5-game winning streak to start the season and finishing with a 6–4 season. After a controversial two week termination, Taylor returned to Arcadia for another 6–4 season then resigning with a 12–8 record overall.

=== San Tan Charter School ===
Announced in April 2020, Taylor returned as a high school head coaching taking the back-to-back CAA Charter League champions, San Tan Charter School in Gilbert, Arizona, into the more competitive AIA 2A conference. With the COVID-19 pandemic restrictions, he was unable to meet the team until on-campus workouts starting June 1. He was fired in October 2021. In his final game of the season, he led San Tan Charter to a 40–22 win over Arete Prep. At the end of the contest, players stomped out a painted breast cancer ribbon at the 50-yard-line of Arete Prep's field. The ribbon was painted on the field to honor the wife of Arete Prep coach Cord Smith, who was suffering from Stage 4 breast cancer. San Tan Charter mentioned the post-game altercation as one of the reasons for Taylor's firing.
