= Alta Vista (disambiguation) =

AltaVista is search engine company, which is now owned by Yahoo!.

Alta Vista (Spanish and Portuguese expression that literally means "a view from above") or Altavista may also refer to:

== Places ==
=== Belize ===
- Alta Vista, Belize, a village in Stann Creek District

=== Canada ===
- Alta Vista, Ottawa, neighbourhood in the country's capital city of Ottawa, Ontario
  - Alta Vista Drive, suburban road in the Alta Vista neighbourhood of Ottawa
  - Alta Vista Ward, municipal election ward which includes the Alta Vista neighborhood, along with others in Ottawa

=== Mexico ===
- Altavista (Zacatecas), a Mesoamerican archaeological site in Zacatecas
- Altavista petroglyph complex in Nayarit
- Altavista (Mexico City Metrobús), a neighbourhood and a BRT station in southern Mexico City

=== United States ===
- Alta Vista, California
  - Alta Vista High School (California), in Mountain View, California
- Alta Vista, Iowa
- Alta Vista, Kansas
- Alta Vista Township, Minnesota
- Alta Vista, Missouri
- Altavista, Virginia
  - Altavista High School, Virginia
  - Altavista Downtown Historic District, Virginia
- Alta Vista, Washington
- Alta Vista High School (Arizona), in Tucson, Arizona
- Alta Vista Terrace District, a historic district in Chicago, Illinois

== Other uses ==
- Juan Carlos Altavista (1929-1989), Argentinian actor

== See also ==
- Alta Vista High School (disambiguation)
- Atavista, an album by Childish Gambino, 2024
- Vista (disambiguation)
- Alta (disambiguation)
