= Floyd Hudlow =

American football player (1943–2021)

No. 49, 24, 43
- Position: Defensive back

Personal information
- Born: November 9, 1943; Phoenix, Arizona, U.S.
- Died: March 22, 2021 (aged 77); Ocean Springs, Mississippi, U.S.
- Listed height: 5 ft 11 in (1.80 m)
- Listed weight: 195 lb (88 kg)

Career information
- High school: West (Phoenix)
- College: Phoenix (1961–1962); Arizona (1963–1964)
- NFL draft: 1965: 9th round, 119th overall pick
- AFL draft: 1965: 10th round, 80th overall pick

Career history
- Buffalo Bills (1965); Philadelphia Eagles (1966)*; Atlanta Falcons (1966–1968); Montreal Alouettes (1969); Orlando Panthers (1969)
- * Offseason or practice squad member only

Awards and highlights
- AFL champion (1965)

Career NFL/AFL statistics
- Interceptions: 2
- Sacks: 1
- Stats at Pro Football Reference

Floyd Leroy Hudlow (November 9, 1943 – March 22, 2021) was an American professional football defensive back who played for the Buffalo Bills of the American Football League (AFL) and the Atlanta Falcons of the National Football League (NFL). He was selected by the Bills in the tenth round of the 1965 AFL draft after playing college football at the University of Arizona.

== Early life ==
Floyd Leroy Hudlow was on November 9, 1943, in Phoenix, Arizona. He attended West Phoenix High School in Phoenix.

== College career ==
Hudlow played college football at Phoenix Junior College from 1961 to 1962 as a running back and safety. As a freshman in 1961, he rushed 63 times for 444 yards while scoring seven touchdowns, earning Arizona Daily Star All-Arizona junior college honors. In 1962, he totaled 75 rushing attempts for 417 yards, 11 interceptions, and 14 total touchdowns, garnering Arizona Daily Star All-Arizona junior college recognition for the second consecutive season.

Hudlow was then a two-year letterman for the Arizona Wildcats of the University of Arizona from 1963 to 1964. In 1963, he rushed 33 times for 94 yards while also catching 13 passes for 167 yards and three touchdowns. He also led the Western Athletic Conference (WAC) with 422 kick return yards. Hudlow was named second-team All-WAC for the 1963 season. In 1964, Hudlow recorded 73 carries for 402 yards and five touchdowns, five receptions for 53 yards, 261 punt return yards, three punt return touchdowns, and 238 kick return yards. He earned first-team All-WAC honors that year. He set WAC records for most career kickoff return yards with 658, highest career yards per kickoff return with 27.4, and single-season yards per punt return with 27.1. He majored in history at the University of Arizona. Hudlow was invited to the East–West Shrine Game after his senior season and ended up playing the entire game at cornerback for the West team. He also played in the Senior Bowl, returning a punt for 44 yards and recovering one fumble.

== Professional career ==
In November 1964, Hudlow was selected by the Buffalo Bills in the tenth round, with the 80th overall pick, of the 1965 AFL draft and by the Philadelphia Eagles in the ninth round, with the 119th overall pick, of the 1965 NFL draft. On November 30, 1964, he signed a futures contract with the Bills, worth $15,000 plus an $8,000 signing bonus. He was released on September 7, 1965, and signed to the team's taxi squad. He was promoted to the active roster on October 17 and then played in seven games for the Bills during the 1965 season, returning two kicks for 36 yards and one punt for 12 yards. On December 26, 1965, the Bills beat the San Diego Chargers in the 1965 AFL Championship Game by a score of 23–0.

Hudlow signed with the Philadelphia Eagles on February 1, 1966. He was released on August 23, 1966.

Hudlow was then claimed off waivers by the Atlanta Falcons, and moved to the team's taxi squad. He re-signed with the Falcons in 1967. He played in ten games, all starts, for the Falcons during the 1967 season, totaling two interceptions for 25 yards, one sack, two kick returns for 56 yards, and one punt return for two yards. Hudlow was released in 1968 but signed to the taxi squad. He was promoted to the active roster on October 31, 1968, and appeared in seven games that year. He was released on August 1, 1969.

Hudlow signed with the Montreal Alouettes of the Canadian Football League on August 6, 1969, but was released on August 13, 1969.

Hudlow played linebacker for the Orlando Panthers of the Continental Football League in 1969. The Panthers went 10–2 during the 1969 season and lost in the playoffs to the Indianapolis Capitols.

== Personal life ==
Hudlow started a flag football league called the Arizona Nine-man Flag Football League in 1973 and also played in the league himself, winning several championships. He died on March 22, 2021, in Ocean Springs, Mississippi, at the age of 77.
