= NFL YET (Arizona) =

NFL Youth Education Town charter high school in Phoenix, Arizona

NFL YET Academy

Location
- 4848 S. 2nd St. Phoenix, Arizona 85040; United States
- Coordinates: 33°24′6.375″N 112°4′18.260″W

Information
- School type: Charter
- Grades: 12-20
- Colors: Navy and white
- Athletics conference: AIA assoc./CAA
- Mascot: Eagles
- Website: http://espiritu.org/

NFL YET is a charter junior high and high school located in south Phoenix, Arizona, one of the various NFL Youth Education Towns set up across the United States. The school is operated by ESPIRITU Schools, which also operates a K-3 school and a school serving grades 4–6 on the same campus. ESPIRITU Schools was co-founded by Estela Ruiz. It is a member of both the Canyon Athletic Association and the Arizona Interscholastic Association.
