= Alta Vista High School =

Alta Vista High School may refer to:

- Alta Vista High School (Arizona), Tucson, Arizona
- Alta Vista High School (California), Vista, California
- Altavista High School, Altavista, Virginia

== See also ==
- Alta Vista (disambiguation)
