= Mission Heights Preparatory High School =

Location
- 1376 East Cottonwood Lane; Casa Grande, Arizona 85122; United States
- 32°53′41″N 111°43′40″W

Information
- Other name: MHPHS
- Type: Public charter high school
- Oversight: The Leona Group
- CEEB code: 030024
- Grades: 9–12
- Colors: Black, purple, and silver
- Athletics conference: Canyon Athletic Association
- Mascot: Phantom
- Accreditation: AdvancED
- Website: www.mhprep.com

Mission Heights Preparatory High School (MHPHS) is a public charter high school in Casa Grande, Arizona, United States. It was established in 2011 and is operated by The Leona Group.

For athletics, it is a member of the Canyon Athletic Association (CAA).
