= Maya High School =

Location
- 3660 W. Glendale Avenue; Phoenix, Arizona 85051; United States
- Coordinates: 33°32′23.31″N 112°8′16.61″W

Information
- School type: Public charter high school
- Established: 1998
- Principal: Tom E. Welsh
- Grades: 9-12
- Enrollment: 375 (2023-2024)
- Colors: Teal, Black, Gray
- Mascot: Jaguars
- Accreditation: AdvancED
- Information: 602.242.3442
- Website: www.mayahs.com

Maya High School is a public charter high school in Phoenix, Arizona. It is managed by The Leona Group. It is a member of the Canyon Athletic Association.
