= South Pointe High School =

South Pointe High School may refer to:

- South Pointe High School (Phoenix, Arizona)
- South Pointe High School (Rock Hill, South Carolina)

== See also ==
- South Point High School (disambiguation)
