= Herman Gardens =

Former public housing project located in Detroit, Michigan, United States

Coordinates: 42°21′14″N 83°12′41″W

Herman Gardens was a public housing project located on the westside of Detroit, Michigan.

== History ==
Built in 1943, Herman Gardens, known locally as "the Gardens", had 2,144 units primarily within two-story multi-family buildings. The 129-unit Gardenview Senior building was on the Herman Gardens site.

The Gardens was located on the west side of Detroit at the southeast corner of the Joy Road and Southfield Freeway intersection close to what was then termed "some of the most affluent neighborhoods in the City of Detroit." The Gardens were home to some notable individuals. Automobile giant John DeLorean, TV Judge Greg Mathis, talk show host and author Peter Werbe, and classic Motown group The Spinners all called Herman Gardens home.

After problems had occurred in the buildings from the illegal drug trade in the early 1980s, the Detroit Housing Commission (DHC) applied for HOPE VI funds under the 1996 Notice of Funding Availability (NOFA), it intended to reduce the number of public housing units from 1,573 to 672. By August 1996, HUD had approved the demolition of 685 units using other (non-HOPE VI) funds, and the HOPE VI application proposed demolishing another 538 units. The application proposed renovating 274 of those existing units and building 222 new houses, along with 92 single-family houses and 84 duplexes, for a total of 672 units at the revitalized site.

The cover letter for the 1996 application declared, "The Plan presented in this application does far more than demolish and rehabilitate old apartments, it rebuilds lives on a foundation of entrepreneurship, jobs, and training."

=== Gardenview Estates ===
After over a decade of planning, the first phase of the 607-unit, mixed-income development named Gardenview Estates was opened on the former site of Herman Gardens on September 2, 2009. 541 units were built as multi-family rentals, of which 278 of those are reserved for low-income residents. The remaining 66 units were built as single-family homes on 45 and 65-foot lots. Also included in the redevelopment of the site was the construction of the Detroit/NFL Boys and Girls Club Youth Education Town, an educational and recreation center for children, which was opened in May 2007.

== Notable residents ==
- Billy West, voice actor. Lived with his family in the 1950s.
