= Estrella High School =

Charter high school in Avondale, Arizona

Coordinates: 33.440322°N 112.350154°W

Location
- 510 N. Central Ave. Avondale, Arizona 85323; United States

Information
- School type: Public charter high school
- Principal: Amanda Bachler
- Grades: 9-12
- Enrollment: 138 (2024-2025)
- Mascot: Sidewinder
- Accreditation: North Central Association

Estrella High School is a public charter high school in Avondale, Arizona. It is operated by The Leona Group. It is a member of the Canyon Athletic Association.
