= Super Bowl Experience =

Annual event hosted in the Super Bowl host city

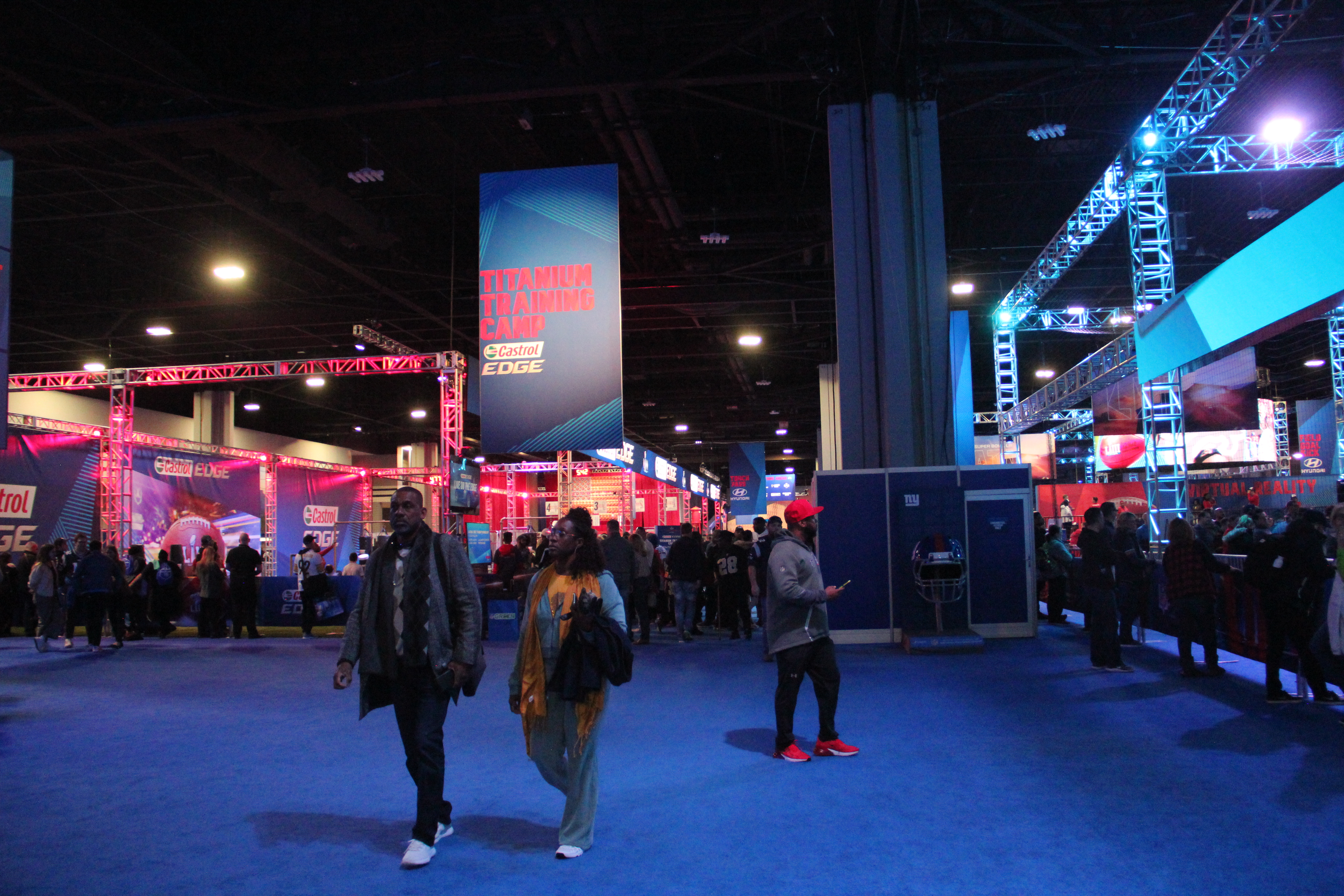
The Super Bowl Experience at Georgia World Congress Center for Super Bowl LIII.

The Super Bowl Experience (formerly the NFL Experience) is an annual event which has been held since 1992 at a venue in the host city of the Super Bowl. The event is described as an interactive "theme park", featuring various fan-oriented attractions, including football-related activities and autograph sessions with current and former players. Proceeds from the sale of Super Bowl Experience tickets go to fund the NFL's Youth Education Town (YET) initiative, which constructs facilities (typically in low-income neighborhoods of Super Bowl host cities) offering afterschool programs for youth. Tickets to this event are free and can be assessed at the OnePass App on the NFLs main website.

In November 2017, the NFL opened an NFL Experience attraction at New York City's 20 Times Square, in collaboration with Cirque du Soleil, which featured a similar array of interactive experiences and memorabilia. Consequently, the NFL began to refer to the travelling event as the Super Bowl Experience beginning in 2018 for Super Bowl LII in Minneapolis–Saint Paul. The Times Square venue was short lived, closing only just over a year later due to underperformance.

== History ==
The first NFL Experience was held at the Minneapolis Convention Center in January 1992 prior to Super Bowl XXVI. The NFL's interactive theme park was followed by Major League Baseball's first "FanFest" in San Diego, California six months later.

The NFL Experience was not held for Super Bowl XLVIII. Instead, the NFL organized an outdoor festival known as Super Bowl Boulevard along Broadway and Times Square in New York City, which featured a similar array of fan-oriented events and attractions (such as an artificial toboggan hill). As a tie-in for its tenth annual Puppy Bowl special (which traditionally airs on the day of the Super Bowl), Animal Planet hosted a "Puppy Bowl Experience" at the nearby Discovery Times Square exhibition space.

The 2017 NFL Experience was hosted at George R. Brown Convention Center in Houston. The Houston Super Bowl Host Committee also hosted its own outdoor festival, Super Bowl Live, in the adjacent Discovery Green park, which featured entertainment events.

For Super Bowl LII, the event was renamed the Super Bowl Experience.

The Super Bowl LV experience was held at Julian B. Lane Riverfront Park, with capacity and health protocols in place due to the COVID-19 pandemic.

Besides the Super Bowl Experience at the Phoenix Convention Center, the Arizona Super Bowl Host Committee also hosted its own outdoor festival, Super Bowl Live, at Margaret T. Hance Park, which featured local entertainment.

== Events ==
Super Bowl	Dates	Venue	Ref
XXVI	January 24–27, 1992	Minneapolis Convention Center	
XXVII	1993	Rose Bowl	
XXVIII	January 26–30, 1994	Georgia World Congress Center	
XXIX	1995	Joe Robbie Stadium	
XXX	January 24–27, 1996	Sun Devil Stadium	
XXXI	January 23–26, 1997	New Orleans Morial Convention Center	
XXXII	January 22–25, 1998	Qualcomm Stadium	
XXXIII	January 22–24, 1999	Pro Player Stadium	
XXXIV	January 27–30, 2000	Georgia World Congress Center	
XXXV	January 20–21 and January 25–28, 2001	Raymond James Stadium	
XXXVI	January 30 – February 3, 2002	New Orleans Morial Convention Center	
XXXVII	January 18–19 and January 23–26, 2003	Embarcadero Marina Park South	
XXXVIII	January 29 – February 1, 2004	George R. Brown Convention Center	
XXXIX	January 29 – February 6, 2005	JEA Park	
XL	February 1–5, 2006	Cobo Hall	
XLI	January 27, 2007 – February 4, 2007	Dolphin Stadium	
XLII	January 26–27 and January 31 – February 2, 2008	University of Phoenix Stadium	
XLIII	January 24 – February 1, 2009	Raymond James Stadium	
XLIV	2010	Miami Beach Convention Center	
XLV	January 27–30 and February 2–6, 2011	Dallas Convention Center	
XLVI	January 27 – February 4, 2012	Indiana Convention Center	
XLVII	January 30 – February 3, 2013	New Orleans Morial Convention Center	
XLVIII	Not held		
XLIX	January 24 – February 1, 2015	Phoenix Convention Center	
50	January 30 – November 7, 2016	Moscone Center	
LI	January 28–29 and February 1–5, 2017	George R. Brown Convention Center	
LII	January 27–29 and January 31 – February 3, 2018	Minneapolis Convention Center	
LIII	January 26 – February 2, 2019	Georgia World Congress Center	
LIV	January 25–26, January 29 – February 1, 2020	Miami Beach Convention Center	
LV	January 29–31 and February 3–6, 2021	Julian B. Lane Riverfront Park	
LVI	February 5–6 and February 10–12, 2022	Los Angeles Convention Center	
LVII	February 4–5 and February 9–11, 2023	Phoenix Convention Center	
LVIII	February 7–10, 2024	Mandalay Bay Convention Center	
LIX	February 5–8, 2025	New Orleans Morial Convention Center	
LX	February 3–7, 2026	Moscone Center	

== NFL Experience Times Square ==
On November 30, 2017, the NFL opened an attraction known as NFL Experience Times Square, within four ground-level floors of 20 Times Square in New York City. The 40,000 square-foot attraction was a collaboration with Cirque du Soleil Entertainment Group, and featured various interactive activities and multimedia experiences, including a 4D film, a simulated locker room and practice area, displays of memorabilia, and a bar and restaurant that would feature a rotation of menu selections from NFL stadiums. In February 2018, it was announced that NFL Network's Good Morning Football would move to a studio at the attraction in April, after having previously used a CBS studio in New York City.

In September 2018, it was announced that the attraction would close, citing underperforming attendance numbers (which analysts pegged to poor promotion by the NFL, and high ticket prices). It was to remain open through at least the end of 2018. Good Morning Football moved to SportsNet New York's facilities at 4 World Trade Center in November 2018.
