= Sequoia Charter School =

Charter school in Mesa, Arizona

Location
- 1460 S. Horne Street; Mesa, Arizona 85204; United States; 33.3877°N 111.8166°W

Information
- School type: Public Charter School
- Established: 1996
- School district: EdKey
- Director: Jevon Lewis
- Grades: K-12
- Enrollment: 430 (May 2016)
- Colors: Royal blue and gold
- Athletics conference: CAA
- Mascot: Stallions
- Website: Sequoia Charter; Sequoia Deaf School

Sequoia Charter School is a charter school in Mesa, Arizona. The Mesa campus is also home to Sequoia Deaf School. Both schools are operated by EdKey, which also operates 15 other charter schools throughout Arizona. The administration for the schools is located in Building 6 at the Horne Street campus.

== Campus and administration ==
The campus contains eleven school buildings. Buildings 1-6 contain the secondary classrooms (as well as the administration offices), building 8 houses Sequoia Deaf School, and buildings 9-11 are home to the elementary classrooms. The School for the Deaf has students from K-12. Currently, the Principal of Sequoia Elementary is Altreana Anderson, the principal of Sequoia Secondary is Jevon Lewis. The school is accredited by AdvancED.

== Staff ==
The Secondary staff are currently not up to date., as of July 2016, The Elementary staff are currently not up to date.
