= César Chávez Academy =

Aztec Eagles Academy of Detroit

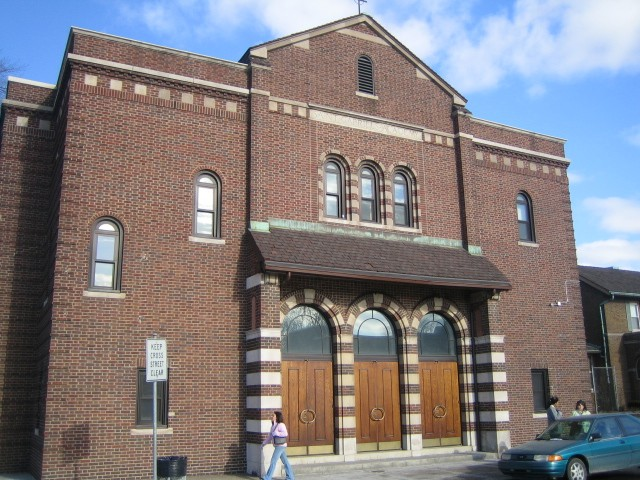

Location
- Detroit, Michigan; United States; 42.3289°N 83.1255°W

Information
- Type: Charter
- Motto: "Si Se Puede- Yes We Can"
- Head teacher: Juan Martinez
- Campus: Urban
- Colors: Navy, red and white
- Mascot: Aztec Eagles
- Website: www.azteceaglesk12.com

Aztec Eagles Academy - La Academia Aztec Eagles is a K-12 public charter school in Detroit, Michigan. It is operated by The Leona Group, an operator of charter schools in Arizona, Florida, Michigan, and Ohio.

== Enrollment increase and grade school renovations ==
Not long after Aztec Eagles opened, MPNE was renamed "The Leona Group" in honor of Bill Coates' mother, Leona Coates. This name change reflected MPNE's change in focus from a quasi-public think tank/advocacy group to a privately owned, for-profit corporation.

== Upper Elementary ==
At some point a separate Upper Elementary complex was added on Martin just south of Michigan Avenue. It uses the former school and parish hall of Our Lady Queen of Angels Church also known as Our Lady of Guadalupe.

== Gallery ==
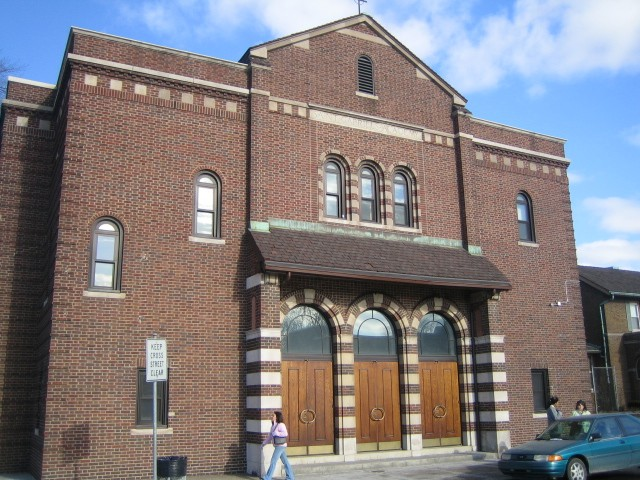
Grade school buildings

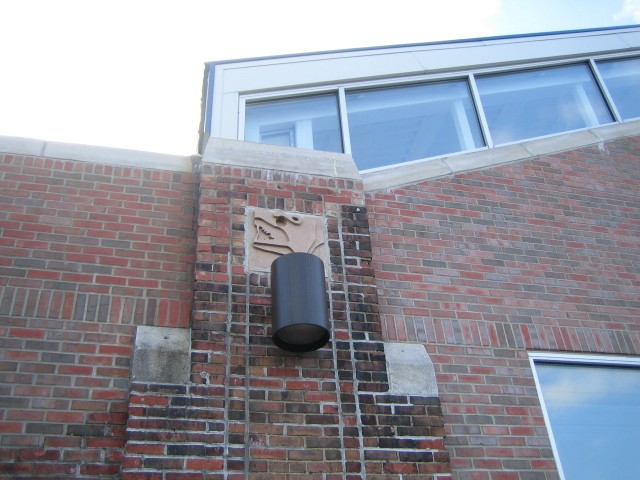
Art on the high school (detail)

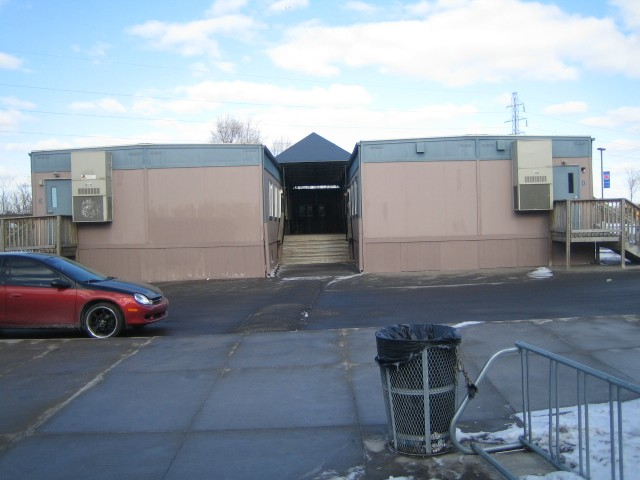
The original high school

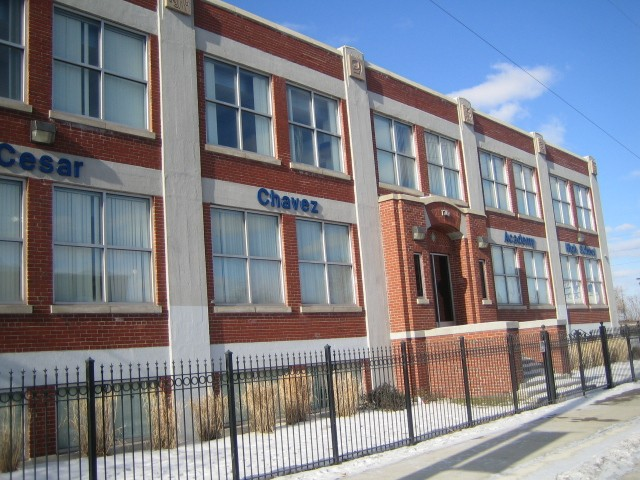
Front of the high school

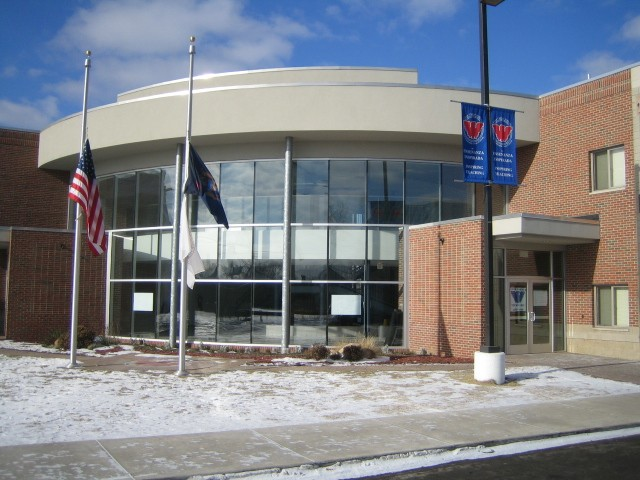
Middle school building

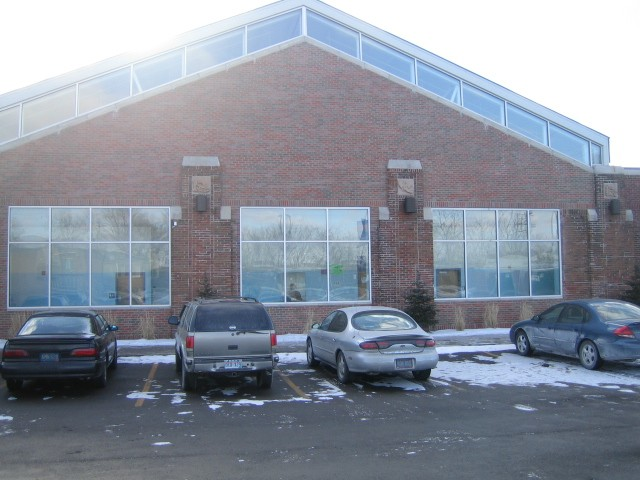
Field house

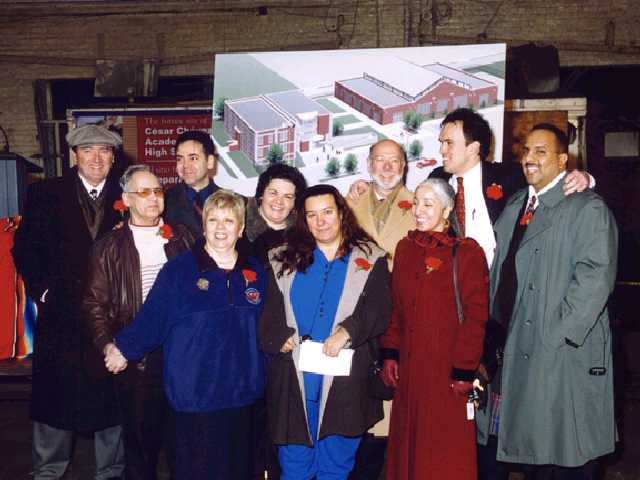
Dedication

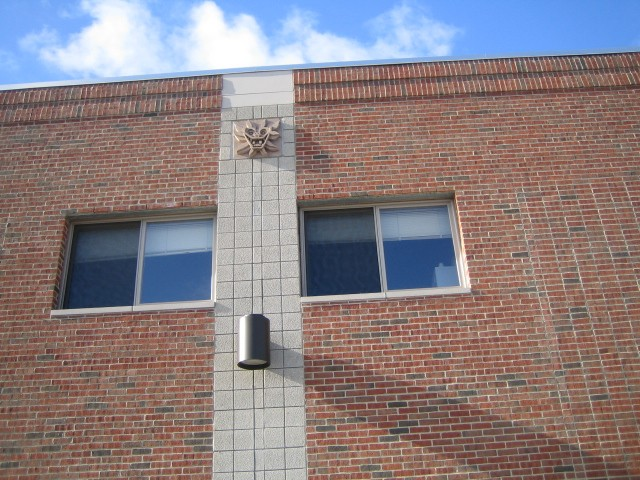
Art on the middle school

== See also ==
- List of public school academy districts in Michigan
