= Crestview College Preparatory High School =

High school in Phoenix, Arizona, US

Coordinates: 33.6270°N 112.0261°W

Crestview Preparatory School

Location
- 2616 E. Greenway Rd. Phoenix, Arizona 85032; United States

Information
- School type: Public charter high school
- Principal: Jon Kronstedt
- Grades: 9-12
- Enrollment: 250 students
- Color: Maroon/silver/black
- Mascot: Knight
- Accreditation: North Central Association

Crestview Preparatory School is a public charter high school in Phoenix, Arizona. It is operated by The Leona Group.

The only high school in the American Charter Schools Foundation D.B.A. Crestvi.
