= West Phoenix High School =

Charter high school in Maricopa County, Arizona

Coordinates: 33.480354°N 112.141963°W

Location
- 3835 W. Thomas Road; Phoenix, Arizona 85019; United States

Information
- School type: Public charter high school
- Principal: Alex Horton
- Grades: 9-12
- Enrollment: 402 (2023-2024)
- Colors: Red, orange, yellow
- Mascot: Eagles
- Accreditation: North Central Association
- Information: 602.269.1110

West Phoenix High School is a public charter high school in Phoenix, Arizona. It is operated by The Leona Group and was one of its first Arizona schools to open.

For athletics, it is a member of the Canyon Athletic Association (CAA).
