= Imagine Prep at Surprise =

Location
- Surprise, Maricopa County, Arizona 85379; United States; 33.6099°N 112.3959°W

Information
- Type: Charter
- Opened: 2008
- Principal: Daniel Hattley
- Colors: Red, black
- Mascot: Storm
- Newspaper: Chasing The Storm
- Website: www.surpriseprep.com

Imagine Prep at Surprise is a public charter school in Surprise, Arizona, and is a member of the Cambridge international program offering the Cambridge Advanced International Certificate of Education (AICE) and Grand Canyon Diploma along with college level courses.

The school opened on September 2, 2008. It is operated by Imagine Schools. The school is a member of the Canyon Athletic Association.

== Sports ==
Fall Sports:

- Cheer & Dance
- Cross Country
- Esports (League of Legends, Rocket League, Super Smash Bros.)
- Middle School/High School Football
- Middle School/High School Volleyball

Winter Sports:

- Middle School Boys Basketball
- Varsity Boys/Girls Basketball
- Middle School Softball
- Wrestling

Spring Sports:

- Esports (League of Legends, Rocket League)
- Middle School Baseball
- Middle School Girls Basketball
- Co-ed Middle School/High School Soccer
- Varsity Softball
- Track & Field

== Honored teachers ==
Imagine Prep at Surprise has three teachers (Alexa Pupo, 2018; Sara Schultz Camren, 2019; and Vicki Robinson, 2020) who have won the Imagine Schools National Teacher of the year award. The National competition involves video recommendations and praise from students and parents as well as a portfolio and interviews.
