= South Pointe High School (Phoenix, Arizona) =

Charter school

Coordinates: 33.370763°N 112.072433°W

Location
- 8325 S. Central Avenue; Phoenix, Arizona 85042; United States

Information
- School type: Charter school
- Established: 2003
- CEEB code: 30580
- Principal: Larry McGill
- Grades: 9–12
- Enrollment: 597 (2023–2024)
- Colors: Purple, Gold and Black
- Athletics: Canyon Athletic Association
- Mascot: Griffin
- Website: http://www.leonagroup.com/southpointehs/

South Pointe High School is a charter high school in Phoenix, Arizona, United States. Established in 2003, the school is managed by the Arizona branch of The Leona Group. It serves mostly central and south Phoenix; Laveen; and parts of Tempe. The student body is approximately 40% African-American, 20% Caucasian and 40% Hispanic and Latino.

== History ==
In 2008 South Pointe opened its two sister schools, South Pointe Elementary School and South Pointe Junior High School. Both are located in South Phoenix.

South Pointe High School was reaccredited in 2009 by AdvancED.

== Curriculum ==
South Pointe offers a wide variety of courses which range from core classes such as English and math, to college preparatory electives such as forensics and special topics courses in race and culture and advanced English classes. A dual enrollment program with South Mountain Community College is available.

== Extracurricular activities ==
Student groups and activities include Ebony Club, FBLA, MEChA, multicultural club, Soul Talk, student government, and yearbook. Other enrichment activities have included a Historically Black College and University tour, as well as a MEChA tour of universities in Los Angeles, CA.

The South Pointe athletic teams, known as the Griffins, competed in Arizona Interscholastic Association-sanctioned events until 2011. The school then jumped to the Canyon Athletic Association, an athletic conference of which most all of Leona Group's Arizona schools are members.
