= 20 Times Square =

Skyscraper in Manhattan, New York

- 701 Seventh Avenue
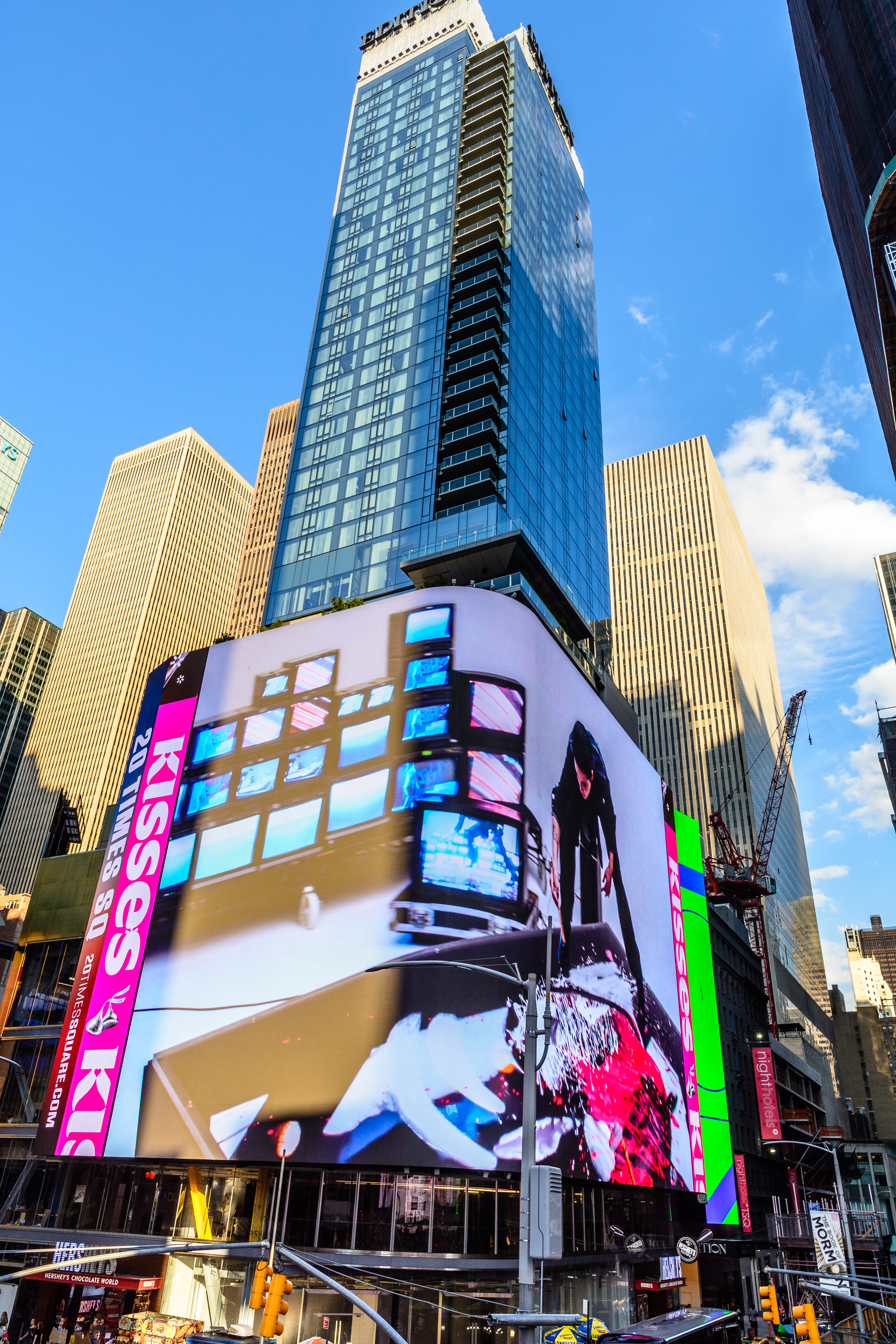
- 20 Times Square in September 2019
- Interactive map of the 20 Times Square area

General information
- Status: Completed
- Type: Hotel and Retail
- Location: 701 Seventh Avenue, New York City, U.S.
- Coordinates: 40.759305°N 73.984163°W
- Construction started: 2013
- Completed: February 2019
- Owner: 701 Seventh Property Owner LLC

Technical details
- Floor count: 42

Design and construction
- Architect: Platt Byard Dovell White Architects
- Developer: The Witkoff Group and Maefield Development
- Engineer: Severud Associates
- Main contractor: CNY Group

20 Times Square is a 42-story mixed-use development at 701 Seventh Avenue, on the northeast corner with West 47th Street at the northern end of Times Square, Manhattan, New York City. The development includes one of Ian Schrager's EDITION Hotels, operated by Marriott, above a 6-floor 76,000 square feet (7,100 m^{2}) retail component. It opened in February 2019.

The building replaces the 1910 structure originally known as the Columbia Amusement Company Building, which had been home to a movie theater known variously as the Mayfair Theatre, the DeMille Theatre, and the Embassy 2-3-4 Theatre. On the upper floors, the Columbia Amusement Company Building had housed the famous Unique Recording Studios, which closed in 2004.

== Development ==
Between 2000 and 2011, the Port Authority of New York and New Jersey (PANYNJ) worked with Vornado Realty Trust, who had partnered with the Lawrence Ruben Company. In November 2007, the PANYNJ announced the terms of an agreement in which it would receive nearly $500 million in a lease arrangement for a new office tower above the Port Authority Bus Terminal that would also provide funds for additional terminal facilities. It would include 1,300,000 square feet (120,000 m^{2}) of commercial space in a new office tower, which was to use the vanity address 20 Times Square, the addition of 60,000 square feet (5,600 m^{2}) of new retail space in the bus terminal, as well as 18 additional departure gates, accommodating 70 additional buses carrying up to 3,000 passengers per hour. New escalators would be installed to help move passengers more quickly between the gate area and the ground floor. Construction was expected to begin in 2009 or 2010 and take four years to complete.

Following in the tradition of Times Square, and the zoning ordinances requirement for building owners to display illuminated signs, the development features a very large wraparound high definition LED screen, known as a Jumbotron. The screen is one of the largest video-capable screens in the world. It features 16 million LED diodes (pixels) measuring only 10mm, providing 18,000 square feet of screen along 200 linear feet of wraparound frontage. This makes the screen the largest single LED screen in New York and over six times the size of the famous Coca-Cola sign in Times Square. The sign is 1,000 square feet (93 m^{2}) larger than Times Square's previous largest, the 17,000-square-foot (1,600 m^{2}) sign on the flagship Walgreens store located at One Times Square.

According to City Planning Department documents, an increase in the size (and FAR) of the 500-foot (150 m) building was made possible by the transfer of air rights from two nearby Broadway locations. The vanity address 20 Times Square was allocated by the City to the development in April 2014. In May 2014 it was announced that the retail space is being leased through the CBRE Group.

== Usage and tenants ==
On November 30, 2017, the National Football League and Cirque du Soleil opened NFL Experience Times Square—an interactive museum attraction devoted to the league, in four ground-level floors. It also contained broadcasting facilities for NFL Network's morning show Good Morning Football. In September 2018, it was announced that the attraction would close after the end of 2018.

In December 2019, just ten months after the EDITION Hotel opened, the French bank Natixis, which had provided the $2 billion dollar financing package for the project, filed to foreclose on the property, asserting that a $650 million portion of the loan package was in default because of numerous undischarged mechanics’ liens recorded against the property. The foreclosure suit also alleged that the developer Maefield had defaulted by failing to lease the project’s retail space by a September 2019 deadline. The suit alleged that as of December 2019, 90% of the property’s retail space had been sitting vacant. A $900 million loan on the building entered servicing in November 2022. After Maefield did not repay the $750 million balance of the loan when it matured in August 2023, Wilmington Trust filed to foreclose on behalf of the lenders.
