= South Ridge High School =

Charter school in Arizona, United States

Coordinates: 33.438572°N 112.204498°W

Location
- 1122 S. 67th Ave. Phoenix, Arizona 85043; United States

Information
- School type: Public charter high school
- Established: August 2006
- Principal: Daniel Gallegos
- Grades: 9-12
- Enrollment: 379 (2023-2024)
- Colors: Forest green, black, white
- Mascot: Mavericks
- Accreditation: Cognia

South Ridge High School is a public charter high school in Phoenix, Arizona. It is operated by The Leona Group. Nearly 70% of its student population is Hispanic, and over three-quarters are below the federal poverty line.

For athletics, it is a member of the Canyon Athletic Association (CAA).
