= The Orme School =

Boarding school in Yavapai County, Arizona

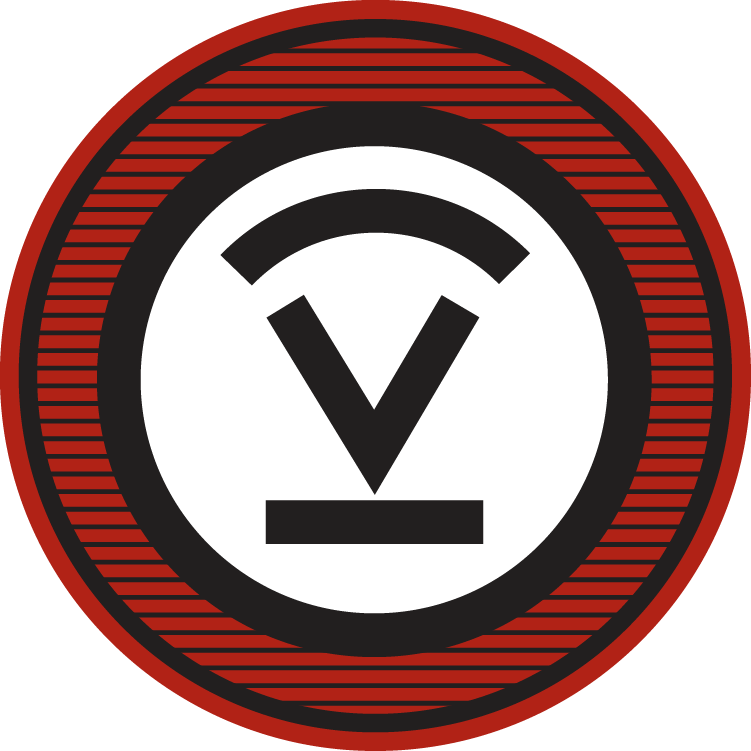

Location
- 1000 E. Orme School Road; Mayer, Arizona 86333; United States; 34.4320°N 112.0706°W

Information
- School type: Private Boarding School
- Motto: Excellence. Tradition. Character.
- Established: 1929 (97 years ago)
- Closed: 2025; 1 year ago
- President: Kris Durow
- Enrollment: 140 students
- Colors: Red and white
- Mascot: Warriors
- Website: www.ormeschool.org

The Orme School was a private college preparatory boarding school serving students in grades 8 through 12 in Yavapai County, Arizona, United States. The 300-acre (120 ha) campus adjoined the Orme Ranch and was located adjacent to the Prescott National Forest. The students were from around the world and across the country. Programs of note included horsemanship, sustainability, and outdoor education.

The property that was the school has a Mayer, Arizona postal address, but is not in the Mayer census-designated place. The Arizona Republic described the school as being in Mayer.

Alia Beard Rau of The Arizona Republic wrote in 2015 that the school has, in quotation marks, a "Southwestern experience" and that it has a "rustic atmosphere and hands-on experience." Kathy Montgomery of Arizona Highways, the magazine of the Arizona Department of Transportation, described it as the sole remaining ranch-based private school that "remains tied to its ranching roots.".

On January 17, 2025, the school announced on its website that its Board of Trustees had "made the incredibly difficult decision...to close The Orme School at the end of this school year (after graduation)." The school cited financial struggles brought on by the pandemic, but also noted it was attempting to raise necessary funds to ensure the school could remain open for another year.

== History ==
In 1929, Charles H. Orme, Sr. and Minna Vrang Orme left their dairy farm in Phoenix and bought a ranch in the high grassland of central Arizona. To educate their three children and those of the ranch employees, they opened a one-room school in an old ranch house that year. That ranch house, called "Old Adobe", is still in use as an English classroom.

It was originally a 1-8 school. An expansion occurred in 1947, with high school classes added. In 1952 the first high school graduation occurred.

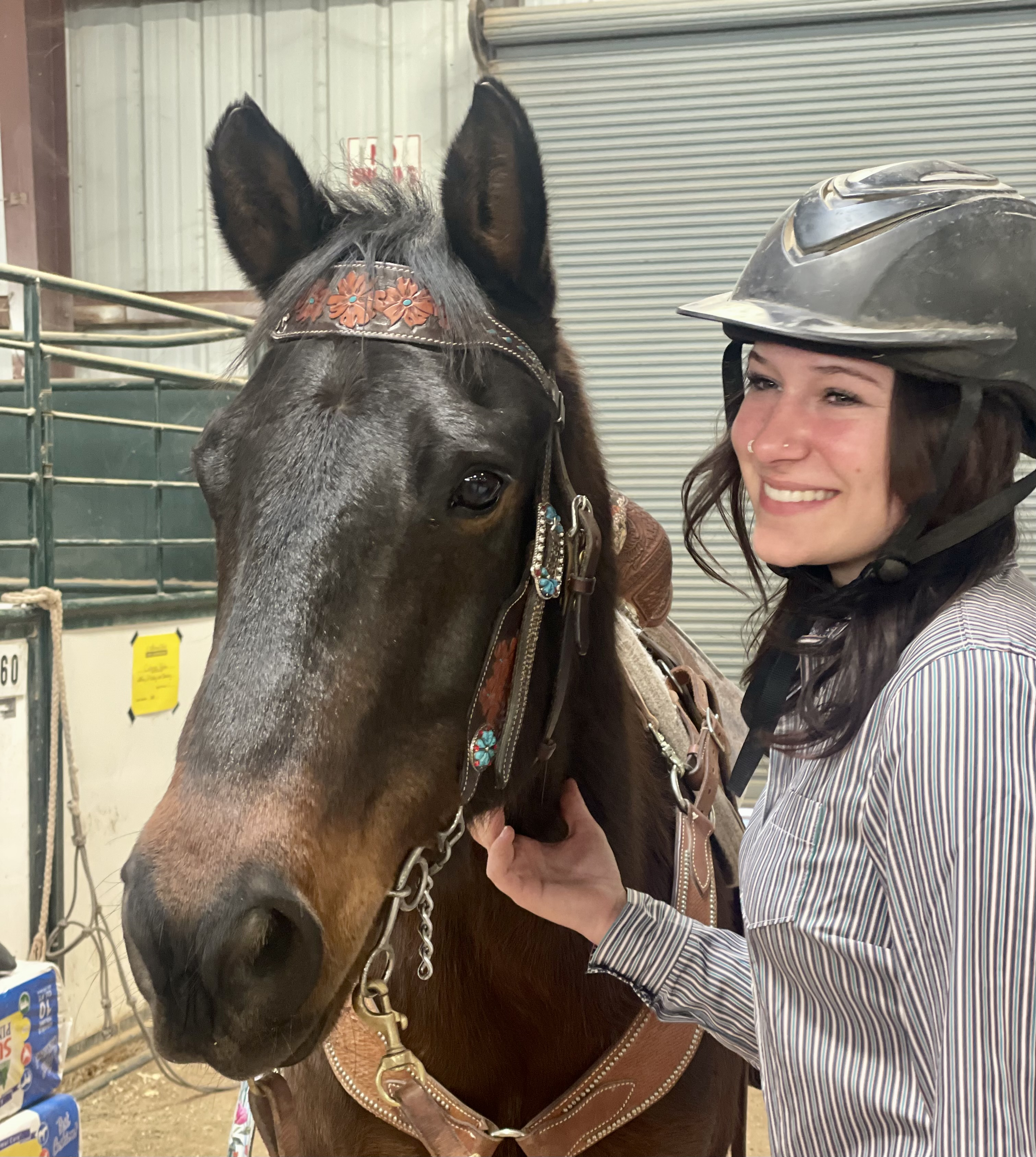
Horses were an important part of campus life at Orme

The school's symbol is the historic brand of the Orme Ranch, which surrounds the school on three sides. Called the "Quarter Circle V Bar", it has been the brand of the ranch and the symbol of the school since their founding. It is a registered brand with the State of Arizona's Department of Agriculture.

In 1987, the school experienced an on-campus shooting incident. After being caught drinking and facing suspension, a student went on a shooting spree, wounding several teachers with a shotgun and another teacher with a pistol which was owned by the school. The student was confronted by police officers while still on campus. After dropping the shotgun, he drew his sidearm and pointed it at police, who shot and killed the student.

The school's student enrollment figures declined during the COVID-19 pandemic in Arizona. In 2025 its enrollment count was 75; 35 of the students came from the State of Arizona. It closed in 2025.

== Campus ==
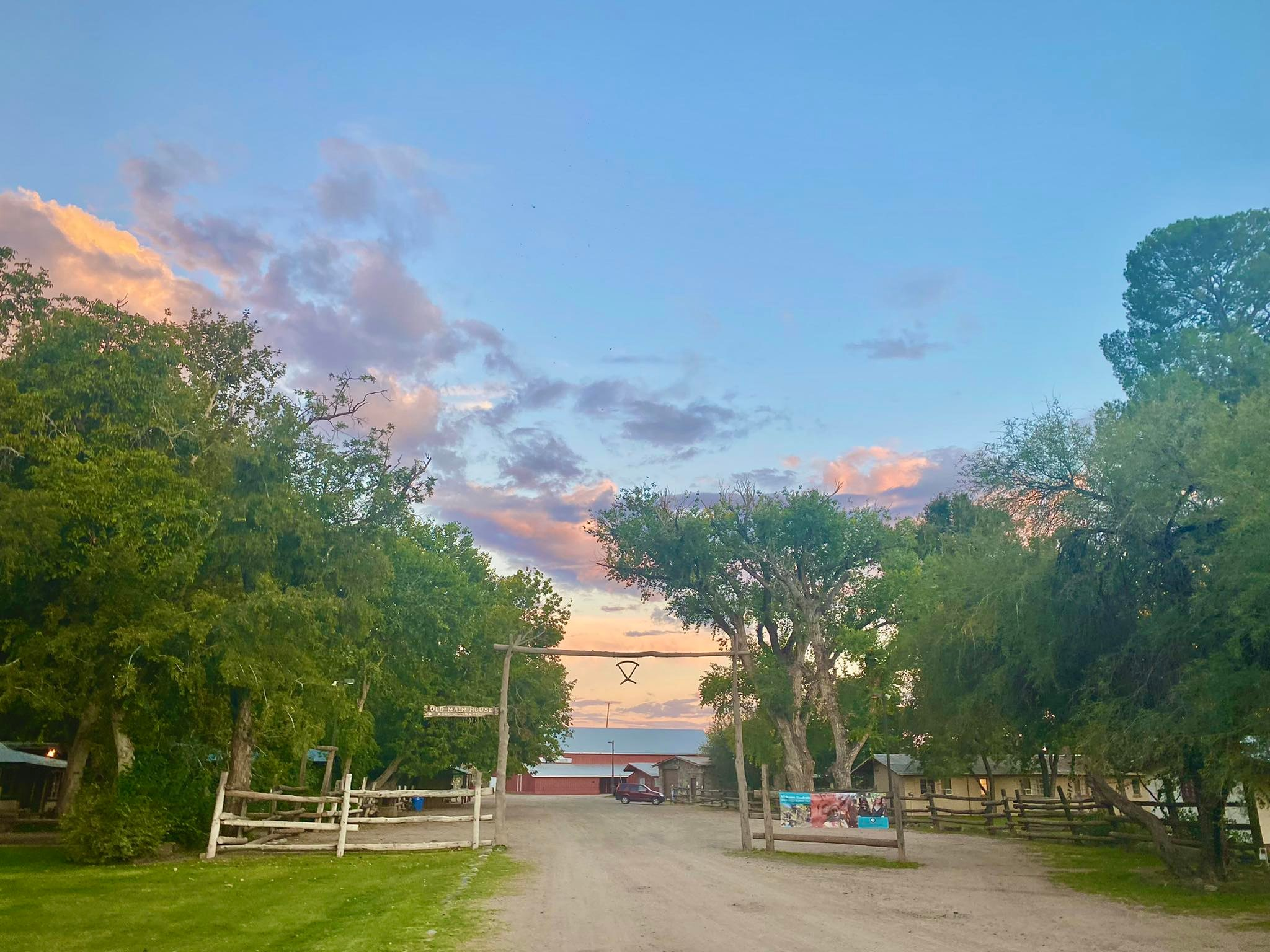
The Orme School had a 300-acre (120 ha) campus

The Orme School campus, amidst the ranch, was set on 0.5 square miles (320 acres). The campus consisted of the Phillips Library, the Willits Gymnasium, Student Commons, Founders' Dining Hall, the Old Main Administration Building, Welcome Center, Buck Hart Horsecollar Theater, Morton Vrang Orme Memorial Chapel, Lecture Hall, Burns Health Center, Mosher Math and Science Center, and seventeen residence halls.

== Operations ==
As of 2015, some students used a State of Arizona tax credit program to afford the tuition.

== Curriculum ==
As of 2015, the school had blacksmithing and horsemanship as course offerings. In 1974 desert survival was another academic course.

In 1974 the teaching style involved students using process of discovery and teachers taking the role of, in the words of Arizona Daily Sun, "moderators".

== Extracurricular activities ==
In 1974 the school had a 4-H club.

== Student body ==
In 1974 U.S.-based students came from 31 states and Washington, DC. At the time other students originated from seven countries.

As of 2019 multiple students from the Crown King community attended Orme for high school.

== Athletics ==
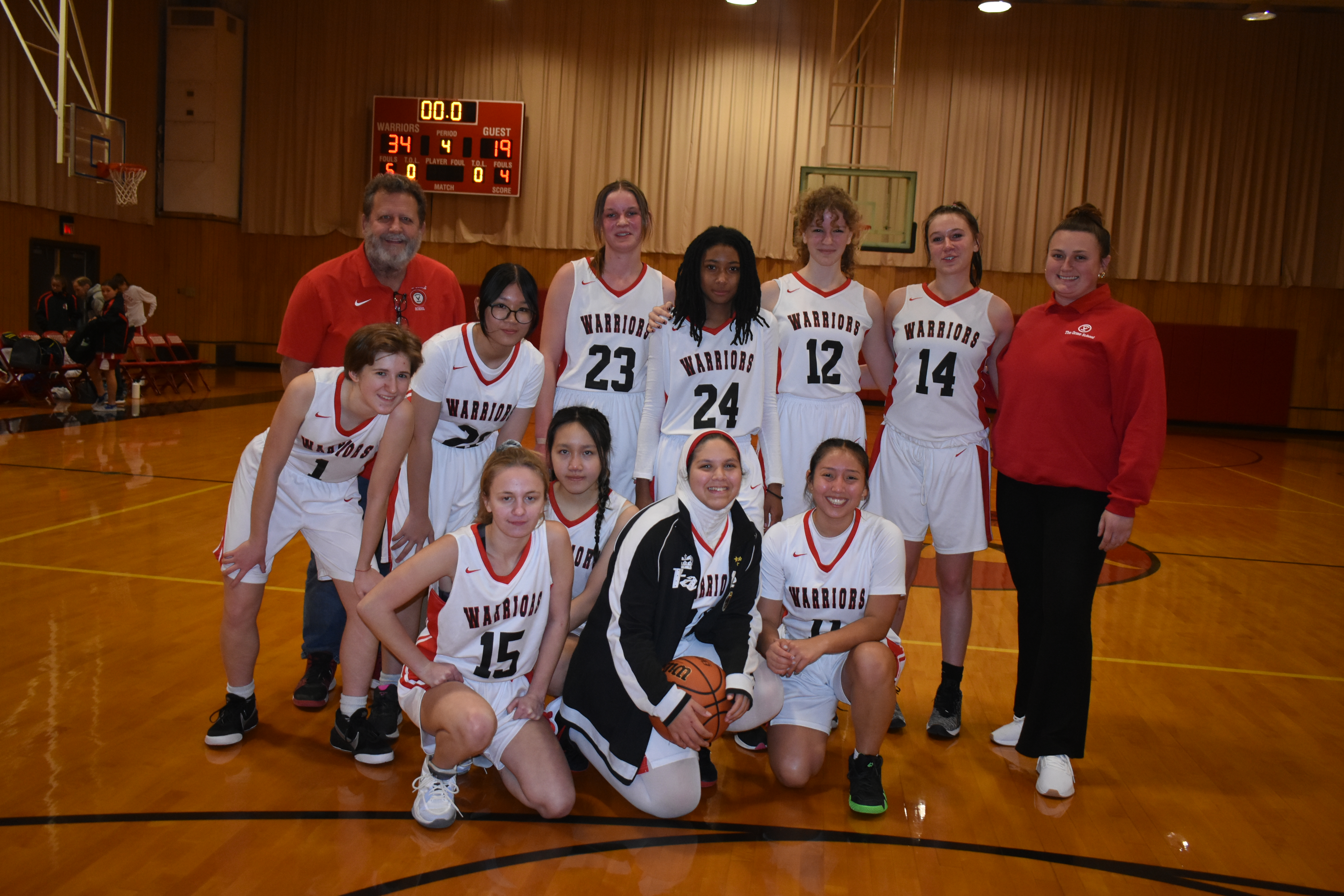

The school's athletic programs had been within the Arizona Independent Athletic Association of independent and private schools and later in the Arizona Interscholastic Association. The boys' football team won the CAA State Championship in the fall of 2013. The boys' basketball team went undefeated and won the AIA 1A state title in 2011, with a starting lineup composed of all international players. The use of international players at Orme and at Westwind Preparatory Academy, another basketball school that won a state title in 2011, resulted in the AIA changing its rules about those students. In response, Orme left the AIA and joined the Canyon Athletic Association (AZCAA).
