= South Point High School =

South Point High School may refer to

- South Point High School (India) in Kolkata
- South Point High School (North Carolina) in Belmont, North Carolina
- South Point High School (Ohio) in South Point, Ohio

== See also ==
- South Pointe High School (disambiguation)
