= Peoria Accelerated High School =

Coordinates: 33.579986°N 112.250007°W

Location
- 8885 W. Peoria Ave. Peoria, Arizona 85345; United States

Information
- School type: Public charter high school
- Principal: Stacy Knetter
- Grades: 9-12
- Enrollment: 496 (2024–2025)
- Color: Dark blue/white
- Mascot: Bulldogs
- Accreditation: North Central Association
- Information: 623.979.0031

Peoria Accelerated High School is a public charter high school in Peoria, Arizona. It is operated by The Leona Group.
