= New Way Academy =

School in Phoenix, Arizona, United States

Coordinates: 33.4733°N 111.9724°W

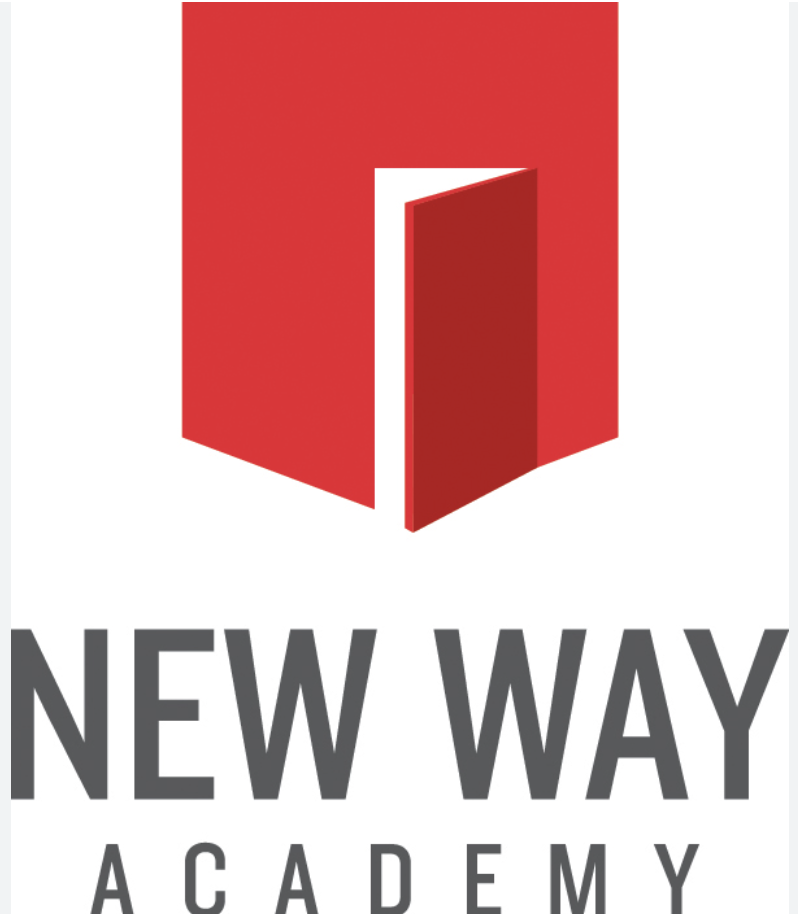
- New Way Academy's Current Logo

Information
- Founded: 1968 (58 years ago)

New Way Academy is a secular day school in Phoenix, Arizona for children with learning differences grades K-12. It is a member of the Canyon Athletic Association.
