= James Madison Preparatory School =

Charter school in Maricopa County, Arizona

Location
- Tempe, Arizona; United States; 33°22′12″N 111°54′38″W

Information
- Type: Charter
- Motto: Historia Est Magistra Vitae (History is the Teacher of Life)
- Established: 2000
- Principal: Debra Caves
- Grades: 6-12
- Enrollment: 130 (2024-25)
- Campus type: Suburban
- Colors: Red, white, and blue
- Mascot: Patriots
- Website: http://www.madisonprep.org/

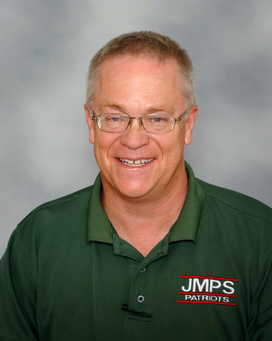
JMPS co-founder David Batchelder

James Madison Preparatory School (abbreviated as JMPS) was a charter school in Tempe, Arizona, serving grades 6–12. Co-founded by brothers Stephen Batchelder and David Batchelder, the school opened in 2000 and closed at the end of the 2025-2026 school year.

== History ==
JMPS was founded by the Batchelder brothers to "challenge committed students with a robust, traditional education emphasizing America’s history and system of government." It was a classical liberal arts school with an emphasis on American history and the United States Constitution.

James Madison Preparatory School opened its doors in the fall of 2000. Fifty-three students showed up on the first day. JMPS had received its charter from the State Charter Board in 1999, having received the highest score ever given for a charter school application up to that time. The first year included only 9th, 10th, and 11th grade students, but by the second year, the school had grown to include 7th, 8th, and 12th graders.

The first graduating class at James Madison Preparatory School was the Class of 2002, which had four graduates. The largest graduating class was the Class of 2012, which had 31 graduates.

The school closed at the end of the 2025-2026 school year due to low enrollment.

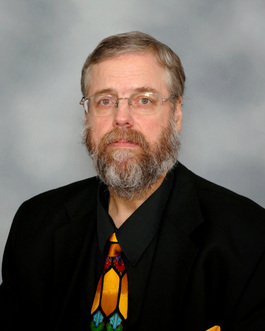
JMPS co-founder Stephen Batchelder

== Academics ==
JMPS offered English Grammar, Civics, American History (one year in middle school and two full years in high school), World History, Geography, Algebra, Geometry, Astronomy, Economics, Biology, Latin, Chemistry, Calculus, Geology, Western Philosophy, Physics, Physical Education, Political Science, Fine Arts, Composition, and Literature. Also included in their curriculum were "self-reliance" classes designed to provide students with real world, practical life skills, including balancing a checkbook, living within a budget, paying taxes, shopping for insurance, cooking a meal, changing a car tire, and sewing on a button.

JMPS was ranked as an "Excelling" school in Arizona for the 2008–2009 school year based on AIMS test results.

== School culture and student government ==
JMPS had a dress code for students, emphasizing business attire such as slacks, dress shoes, and a polo or oxford shirt.

All students were required to participate in a daily chore at the end of each school day, where the students performed minor routine maintenance on the campus such as taking out classroom trash, vacuuming classrooms, and cleaning bathroom windows.

JMPS had a student-run high school government modeled after the American three-branch system of government.

- Each year, the school held an election to decide on the next year's student government president, who then appointed a student cabinet to help manage student affairs, including student fundraisers to fund events such as school dances.
- The Student President also nominated students to serve on a student Supreme Court, which judged and sentenced minor student misconduct cases. Up to nine students would serve on the student court, for terms of up to two years.
- Students were placed into homerooms, where they selected two representatives (for each homeroom) for the school's Student Senate, which voted on Cabinet and Court appointments. The remaining students were encouraged to be involved in the Student House of Representatives, which voted on bills introduced to aid in student government.

The middle school student council served as a liaison between middle school students and the high school government.

=== Houses ===
Students at Madison Prep were placed into "houses," also known as "homerooms" or "advisor groups." Each house held approximately 17 students, and one faculty member was assigned to every house. The faculty advisor served as the contact person between the school and the parents. The advisors worked with the students in their group to help guide them through their academic career and their practical college preparation.

All houses competed with each other for house points throughout the school year to earn the honor of being Top House. House points were earned in a wide variety of ways, and a scoreboard was kept up in the front office.

=== Clubs ===
JMPS offered a variety of clubs, including Anime Club, Art Club, Chess Club, Choreography Club, Debate Club, Improv Club, Student Newspaper, Health and First-Aid Club, Yearbook, Weight Training Club, Archery Club, Quidditch Club, and Spanish Club.

=== Academic Decathlon Team ===
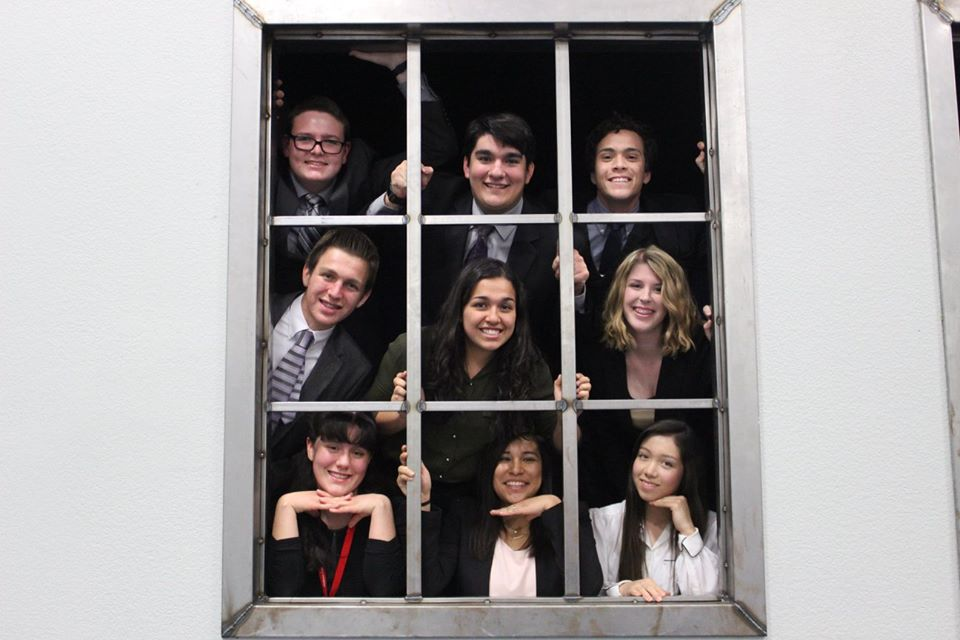
JMPS AcaDec Team of 2016

JMPS had an Academic Decathlon Team. The season ran during the 1st and 2nd trimesters.

The team consisted of three "A" students, three "B" students and three "C" students, as well as one alternate for each of the three grade groups. The students competed as individuals, winning individual gold, silver and bronze medals, and their scores counted toward an overall team score. Winning teams moved on to state and national competitions. Each student competed in the following ten academic events: art, economics, essay, interview, language and literature, mathematics, music, science, social science and speech. The final event of the day was the Super Quiz in which the entire team competed in a game-show type setting in front of an audience of family and friends.

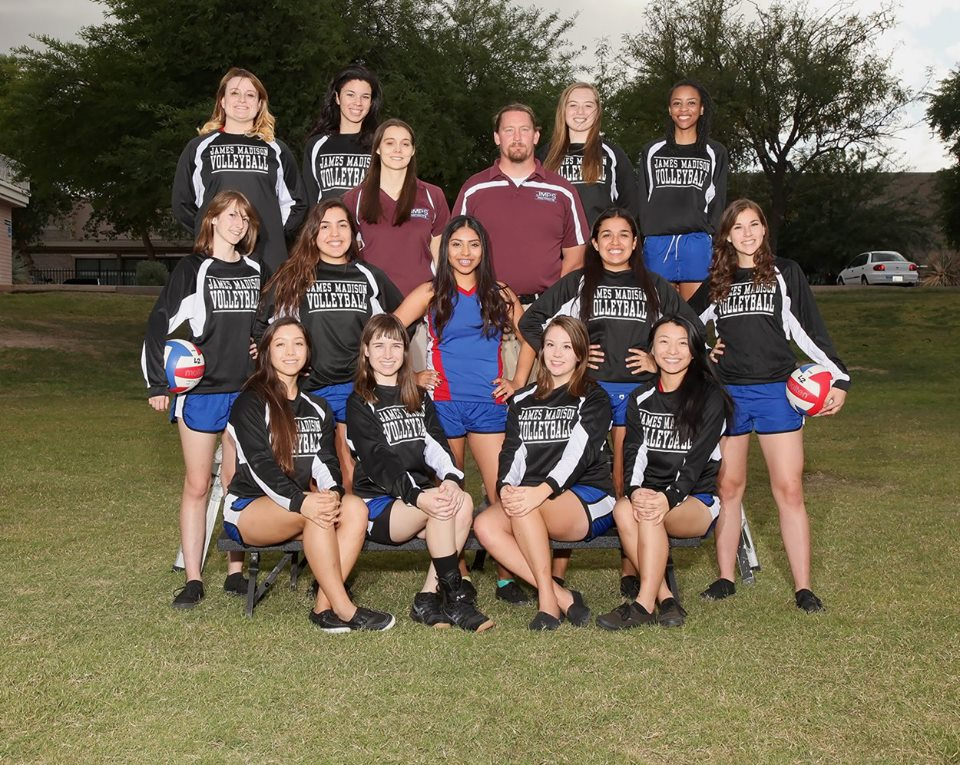
JMPS 2015 volleyball team

=== Athletics ===
All sports teams participated in the Canyon Athletic Association. The school participated in:

- Fall: football, girls' volleyball, Sparx (dance line), Ultimate Frisbee, cross country
- Winter: girls' and boys' basketball
- Spring: coed soccer, track and field, boys' baseball, girls' softball

=== Fine arts ===
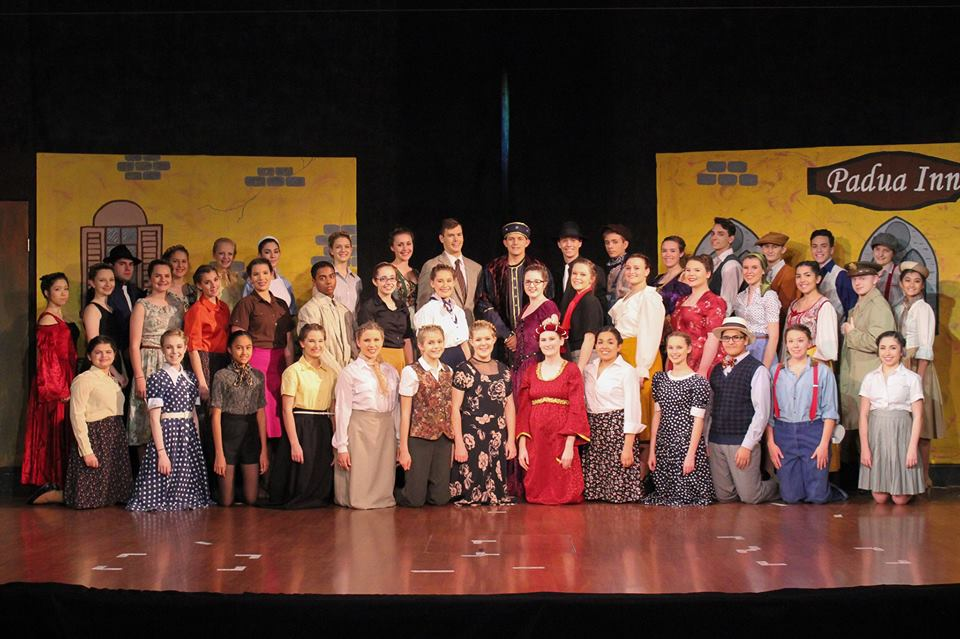
JMPS cast of Kiss Me Kate

Fine arts programs included a choir, string section and a rock band. These groups performed rehearsed pieces at school concerts, and were open to any students interested in joining them.

JMPS also had a student drumline and color guard, which practiced during the fall and performed at football games for JMPS. Each year they held a performance called "Glownight," which was followed by a bonfire led by the seniors.

JMPS also put on several theatrical productions each year, typically including:

- A fall/winter play (open to audition for grades 9–12)
- A spring musical (open to audition for all grades)
- A spring production performed by the 8th grade
