= Spalding High School =

Spalding High School may refer to:

- Spalding High School (Georgia), United States
- Spalding High School, Lincolnshire, England
- Spaulding High School (New Hampshire), United States
- Spalding Institute, Illinois, United States
- Archbishop Spalding High School, Maryland, United States

== See also ==
- Spaulding High School
