= Foothills Academy (Arizona) =

- Scottsdale, Arizona, AZ; U.S.

Information
- Type: charter, day, public (tuition-free), STEAM, K-8, "No Religious Affiliation"
- Established: 1993
- Faculty: 20
- Enrollment: 200
- Average class size: 19
- Campus: Scottsdale, AZ
- Colors: Red & Black
- Mascot: Blackhawks

Foothills Academy was an independent public charter elementary/middle school in Scottsdale, Arizona. It was among the "first wave" of charter schools in State. Serving Kindergarten through Eighth Grade, Foothills Academy class sizes were never more than 24. It was a member of the Canyon Athletic Association, providing sports opportunities for grades 5-8. The campus was sold to Candeo Schools in 2020.

== History ==
Foothills Academy was established by director Dr. Don Senneville. In 2009, Foothills Academy expanded their academics to first through fifth grade students by establishing Foothills Academy Elementary Preparatory. In 2013 the school added a kindergarten class at the elementary school campus. In 2017, Foothills Academy added a preschool to the college preparatory campus. Foothills Academy Connected is FA's fully online schools, offering Arizona students an alternative educational experience to the traditional classroom setting.

Foothills Academy transitioned to a K-8 school, beginning in the 2019-20 school year with enrollment around 200. In addition to the administrative team, the FA family is led by 20 teachers and aids. The school features an individualized approach with multiage integrated classes and an innovative STEAM program for all grade levels.

In 2020, one year after the transition to a K-8 school, Foothills Academy was sold to Candeo Schools, another local Arizona charter school. Candeo Schools continues to enroll elementary students.

== See also ==
- List of high schools in Arizona
