= Westwind Preparatory Academy =

Public charter high school in Phoenix, Arizona

Coordinates: 33.552740°N 112.102687°W

Location
- 2045 W. Northern Avenue; Phoenix, Arizona 85021; United States

Information
- School type: Public charter high school
- Established: 1998
- Closed: May 21, 2015
- Superintendent: Debra Slagle
- Principal: Joel Wakefield
- Grades: 9–12
- Enrollment: High school: 157 (October 1, 2012)
- Colors: Navy blue and gray
- Athletics conference: Canyon Athletic Association
- Mascot: Warriors
- Accreditation: AdvancED

Westwind Preparatory Academy was a college preparatory public charter high school in Phoenix, Arizona, operated by Westwind Children's Services, a nonprofit operator of several other Phoenix-area charter schools, Westwind Community Schools. The school opened in 1998 and closed in 2015. It received accreditation in 2001 as a college preparatory high school. The school was located on a 5-acre site near 19th Avenue and Northern in Phoenix, with student housing adjacent to the campus.

The school was an International Baccalaureate World School from 2010 until its closure. It also had an international division approved with SEVIS, and 20% of its students attended on a tuition basis.

== Basketball ==
In 2007, WPA added a basketball post grad program (sometimes known as a prep program) designed to help basketball players further develop athletically and academically before starting their university experience. Student athletes are required to take academic classes either at the high school level or dual enrollment college classes, in addition to their training and competition. In 2009, WPA's prep program was ranked 6th in the country by ESPN. To date, four WPA alumni have gone on to the NBA: Greg Smith, Jamaal Franklin, Tony Snell, and Gary Payton II. Alum Kiwi Gardner played in the NBA D-League. Over 45 WPA alumni have gone on to play at the collegiate level. During the 2012–13 season, there were only two Chinese players competing at the Division One level, one of which, Ted Wang, is a WPA alumni.

The international facet of the school received attention in 2011 after the school's basketball team won the Arizona Interscholastic Association 2A state title. The composition of the team was heavily international. The situation with Westwind and The Orme School of Arizona prompted changes in AIA policies about international students on sports teams. In its final few years, Westwind Prep moved to the Canyon Athletic Association, which allows international students to compete in athletics.

Phoenix Westwind Prep was first to really start a prep program in the Valley, first coached by Gary Trousdale, then by Jeff de Laveaga in 2011 and '12. But that was short-lived, mainly because academics didn't line up with the NCAA Clearinghouse, forcing players, such as former Arizona State forward Zylan Cheatham, to retake courses in order to catch up and be Division I college eligible after graduating.

== Closure ==
Westwind was shuttered after the 2014–2015 school year due to low enrollment. As of 2019, the entire site where the school once stood has been completely demolished, making way for new developments in the area.
