= Saline High School =

Saline High School may refer to:

- Saline High School (Louisiana), Saline, Louisiana
- Saline High School (Michigan), Saline, Michigan
- Saline Liberty School, Saline, Michigan, originally named Saline High School

== See also ==
- Grand Saline High School, Grand Saline, Texas
