= Southridge High School =

Southridge High School may refer to:

- Southridge High School (Kennewick), in Kennewick, Washington, United States
- Southridge High School (Beaverton, Oregon), in Beaverton, Oregon, United States
- Miami Southridge High School, in Miami, Florida, United States
- Southridge High School (Huntingburg, Indiana), United States
- Southridge School, in Surrey, British Columbia, Canada
- PAREF Southridge School, in Muntinlupa, Metro Manila, Philippines

== See also ==
- South Ridge High School, in Phoenix, Arizona
