= Sterling High School =

Sterling High School may refer to:

- Sterling High School (Baytown, Texas) in Baytown, Texas
- Sterling High School (Colorado) in Sterling, Colorado
- Sterling High School (Houston) in Houston, Texas
- Sterling High School (Illinois) in Sterling, Illinois
- Sterling High School (Kansas) in Sterling, Kansas
- Sterling High School (Nebraska) in Sterling, Nebraska
- Sterling High School (New Jersey) in Somerdale, New Jersey
- Sterling High School (South Carolina) in Greenville, South Carolina

== See also ==
- Stirling High School
