= Sheldon High School =

Sheldon High School may refer to:

- Sheldon High School (California)
- Sheldon High School (Oregon)
- Sheldon High School (Iowa)
