= Skyline High School =

Skyline High School may refer to:

- Skyline High School (Arizona), in Mesa
- Skyline High School (Oakland, California)
- Skyline High School (Colorado), in Longmont
- Skyline High School (Idaho), in Idaho Falls
- Skyline High School (Kansas), in Pratt
- Skyline High School (Michigan), in Ann Arbor
- Skyline High School (Texas), in Dallas
- Skyline High School (Utah), in Millcreek
- Skyline High School (Virginia), in Front Royal
- Skyline High School (Washington), in Sammamish
