= Society for Health Systems =

The Society for Health Systems (SHS) is a professional society within the Institute of Industrial and Systems Engineers to the support the industrial engineering profession and individuals involved with improving quality and productivity within healthcare.
