= Alta Vista Terrace District =

Historic district in Illinois, United States

- Alta Vista Terrace Historic District
- U.S. National Register of Historic Places
- U.S. Historic district
- Chicago Landmark
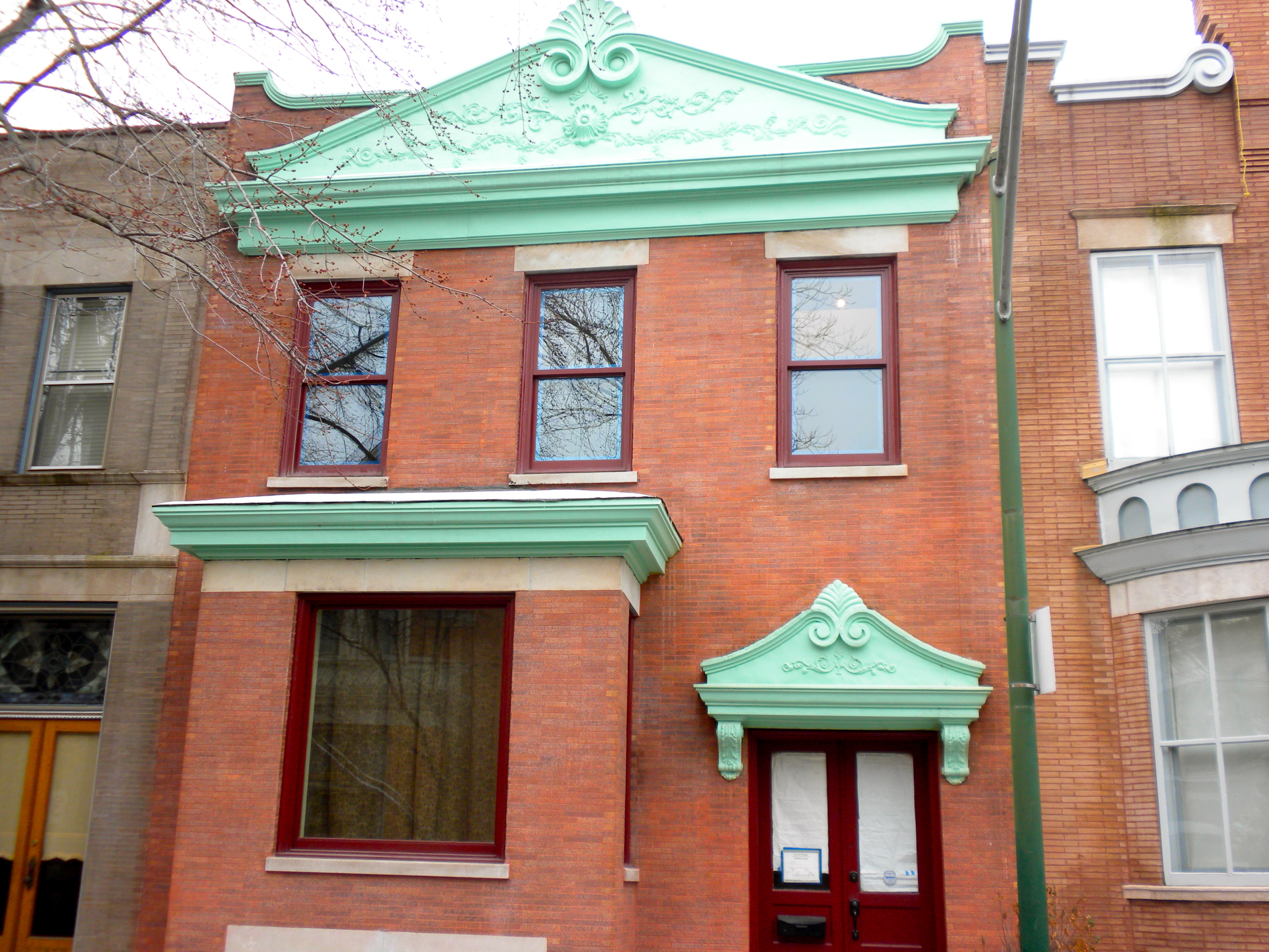

- Location within Chicago Location within Illinois Location within the United States
- Location: Chicago, Illinois
- Coordinates: 41°57′6.53″N 87°39′23.55″W
- Built: 1900
- Architectural style: Late 19th And 20th Century Revivals
- NRHP reference No.: 72000448

Significant dates
- Added to NRHP: March 16, 1972
- Designated CHICL: September 15, 1971

The Alta Vista Terrace District is a historic district in the Lake View community of Chicago, Illinois. The district was built in 1904 in imitation of the rowhouse style of London.

The development was the work of Samuel Gross, who was responsible for several other real estate developments in Chicago. He was inspired to build Alta Vista Terrace after a trip to Europe, in which he looked at the row houses of London. The street is one block long and contains 40 small, single-family rowhouses, each on a lot about 24 feet wide and 40 feet deep. There were 20 different exterior styles based on various adaptations of architectural styles. Some of the features included Doric and Ionic wood pilasters, Gothic arches, Palladian windows, stained and leaded-glass fanlights, bay and bow windows, and various decorative woodwork. Houses on the street were constructed to match with the house diagonally opposite on the street.

Alta Vista Terrace is found at 1050 West on the Chicago street grid, running north from Grace Street (3800 North) to Byron Street (3900 North).

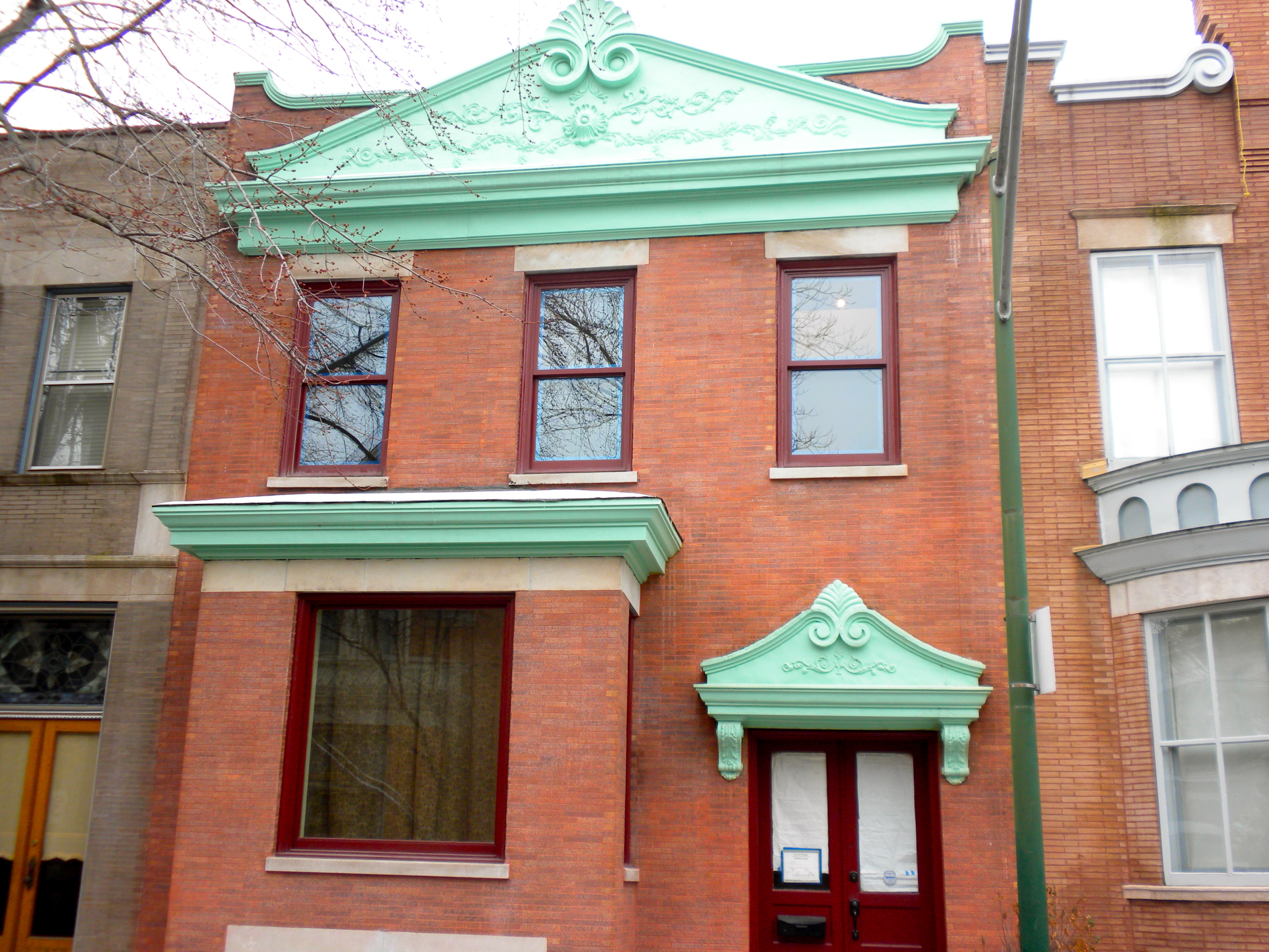
Alta Vista Terrace

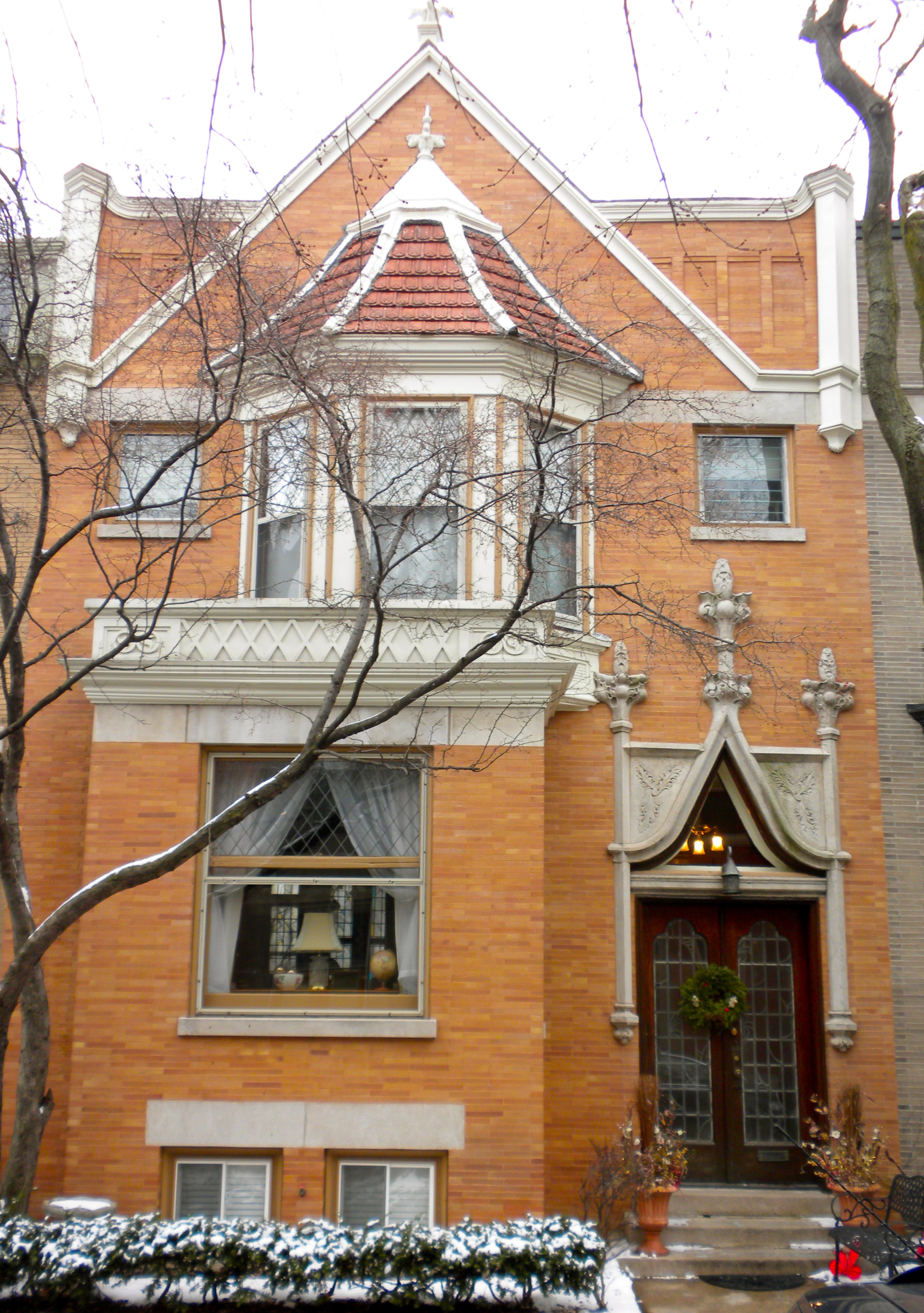
Alta Vista Terrace

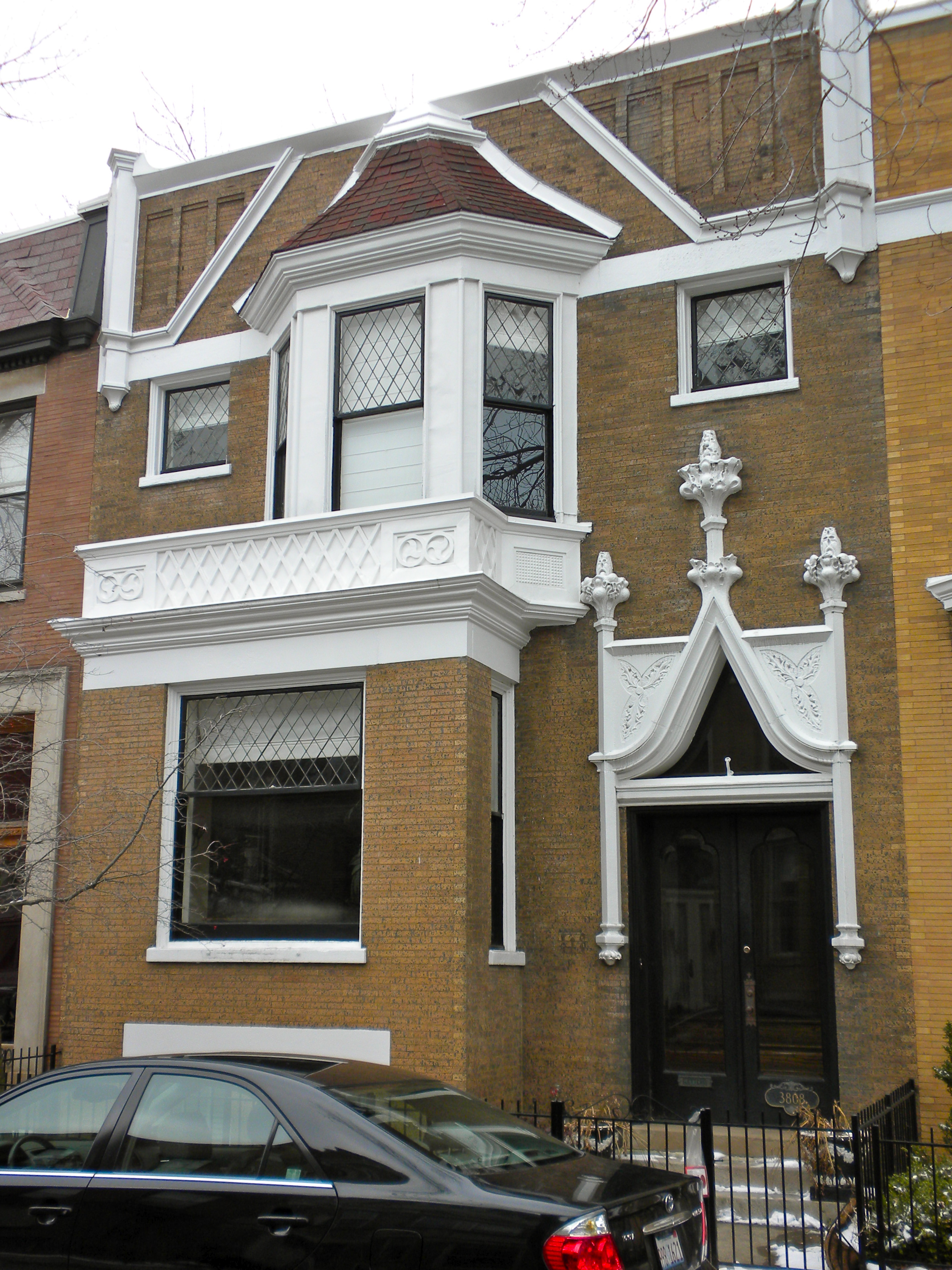
Alta Vista Terrace
