= Silverado High School =

Silverado High School may refer to:

- Silverado High School (Mission Viejo), California, United States
- Silverado High School (Victorville), California, United States
- Silverado High School (Paradise, Nevada), Nevada, United States
