= Spaulding High School =

Spaulding High School may refer to a high school in the United States:

- Spaulding High School (Barre, Vermont)
- Spaulding High School (New Hampshire), in Rochester

== See also ==
- Spalding High School (disambiguation)
