= Sherwood High School =

Sherwood High School High School may refer to:

- Sherwood High School (Maryland) in Sandy Spring, Maryland
- Sherwood High School (Missouri) in Creighton, Missouri
- Sherwood High School (North Dakota) in Sherwood, North Dakota
- Sherwood High School (Oregon) in Sherwood, Oregon
- Sherwood High School (Bannerghatta Road) in south Bengaluru
