= Salisbury High School =

Salisbury High School may refer to:

== Australia ==
- Salisbury State High School in Salisbury, Brisbane, Queensland; merged into Nyanda State High School in 1997.
- Salisbury High School (South Australia) in Salisbury North, South Australia

== Canada ==
- Salisbury Composite High School in Sherwood Park, Alberta
- J.M.A. Armstrong/Salisbury Middle School in Salisbury, New Brunswick

== United States ==
- Salisbury School in Salisbury, Connecticut
- The Salisbury School (Maryland) in Salisbury, Maryland
- Salisbury High School (North Carolina) in Salisbury, North Carolina
- Salisbury High School (Pennsylvania) in Allentown, Pennsylvania
- Salisbury-Elk Lick Junior/Senior High School in Salisbury, Somerset County, Pennsylvania
