= Springville High School =

Springville High School may refer to:

- Springville High School (Alabama), Springville, Alabama
- Springville High School (Iowa), Springville, Iowa
- Springville High School (New York), Springville
- Springville High School (Utah), Springville
