= Shawnee High School =

Shawnee High School may refer to one of several high schools in the United States:

- Shawnee High School (Illinois) in Wolf Lake, Illinois
- Shawnee High School (Kentucky) in Louisville, Kentucky
- Shawnee High School (New Jersey) in Medford, New Jersey
- Shawnee High School (Lima, Ohio) in Lima, Ohio
- Shawnee High School (Springfield Township, Clark County, Ohio) in Springfield Township, Clark County, Ohio
- Shawnee High School (Oklahoma) in Shawnee, Oklahoma
- Shawnee Heights High School in Tecumseh, Kansas
- Preble Shawnee High School in Camden, Ohio
- Shawnee Mission East High School in Prairie Village, Kansas
- Shawnee Mission North High School in Overland Park, Kansas
- Shawnee Mission Northwest High School in Shawnee, Kansas
- Shawnee Mission South High School in Overland Park, Kansas
- Shawnee Mission West High School in Overland Park, Kansas
