= Somerville High School =

Somerville High School may refer to:

- Somerville High School (Massachusetts) in Somerville, Massachusetts
- Somerville High School (New Jersey) in Somerville, New Jersey
- Somerville High School (Texas) in the Somerville Independent School District of Somerville, Texas
