= Sutton High School =

Sutton High School can refer to:

- Sutton High School, London, girls' school in Sutton, London, United Kingdom
- Sutton High School, Plymouth in Sutton, Plymouth, Devon, United Kingdom
- Sutton High School (Nebraska) in Sutton, Nebraska, United States
- Sutton High School (Massachusetts) in Sutton, Massachusetts, United States
- Sutton District High School in Sutton, Ontario, Canada

Also:

- Sutton High Sports College, former name of The Sutton Academy, in St Helens, Merseyside, United Kingdom
