= Seminole High School =

Seminole High School may refer to:

- Seminole High School (Pinellas County, Florida) located in Seminole, Florida
- Seminole High School (Seminole County, Florida) located in Sanford, Florida
- Seminole High School (Oklahoma) located in Seminole, Oklahoma
- Seminole High School (Texas) located in Seminole, Texas
