= El Dorado High School (Arizona) =

Coordinates: 33.340457°N 111.842966°W

Location
- 3000 N. Alma School Rd. Chandler, Arizona 85224; United States

Information
- School type: Public charter high school
- Principal: Bahja M. Ali
- Grades: 9-12
- Colors: Dark blue and gold
- Mascot: Wolverines
- Accreditation: AdvancEd
- Website: http://www.edhswolverines.com/

El Dorado High School is an Cognia accredited public charter high school located in Chandler, Arizona. A part of the Leona Group multi-state network of charter schools, El Dorado serves students in grades 9-12 and offers a curriculum aligned with Arizona state standards in a safe and student-centered small school environment.
