= Socorro High School =

Socorro High School may refer to one of two high schools in the United States

- Socorro High School (Socorro, New Mexico)
- Socorro High School (Socorro, Texas)
