= NFL Youth Education Town =

The NFL Youth Education Town, also known as YET or YET Center, is a chain of educational and recreational centers in the United States. The Boys & Girls Clubs of America operates many of the centers on behalf of the National Football League, but the legacy gift can be awarded to any organization completing a bid and applying for the gift.

Like the Boys and Girls Clubs, YET Centers provide afterschool activities for school-age children. These activities include sports programs, computer training, career development, and tutoring. Each YET is located in a lower-income neighborhood of a city that has hosted a Super Bowl since the early 1990s.

== History ==
Logo with the old NFL logo.

The YET concept grew out of the 1992 Los Angeles riots and the need that arose to correct the social inequities laid bare by that event. The NFL announced that it would build and finance a new after school center in Compton, California as a legacy of Super Bowl XXVII (held in the L.A. area at the Rose Bowl Stadium). Michael Jackson and Garth Brooks also helped finance the opening of the Compton center.

After the success of the Compton YET, the NFL announced that a new center would open in conjunction with each new Super Bowl. As of January 2008, there were 12 centers in 10 locations (San Diego and Tampa have two each, as those cities have hosted multiple Super Bowls in this period), and three others were under construction. The NFL has considered a Youth Education Town in Honolulu, Hawaii in honor of the Pro Bowl.

In 2011, The Salvation Army was awarded the legacy gift in honor of Super Bowl XLV and, after two years of planning and renovations, opened the North Texas Youth Education Town in Arlington, Texas in Fall 2013.

In 2012, Indianapolis, IN received the gift and created the Chase Near Eastside Legacy Center which became a combination YET hosting youth activities as well as a full health fitness facility. The Chase Near Eastside Legacy Center is owned and managed by the John H. Boner Community Center.

== Fundraising ==
The main public fundraiser is the NFL Experience, the league's version of a theme park which is open the weekend before and the weekend of the Super Bowl. A portion of each admission price is donated to YET.
