= Salt River High School =

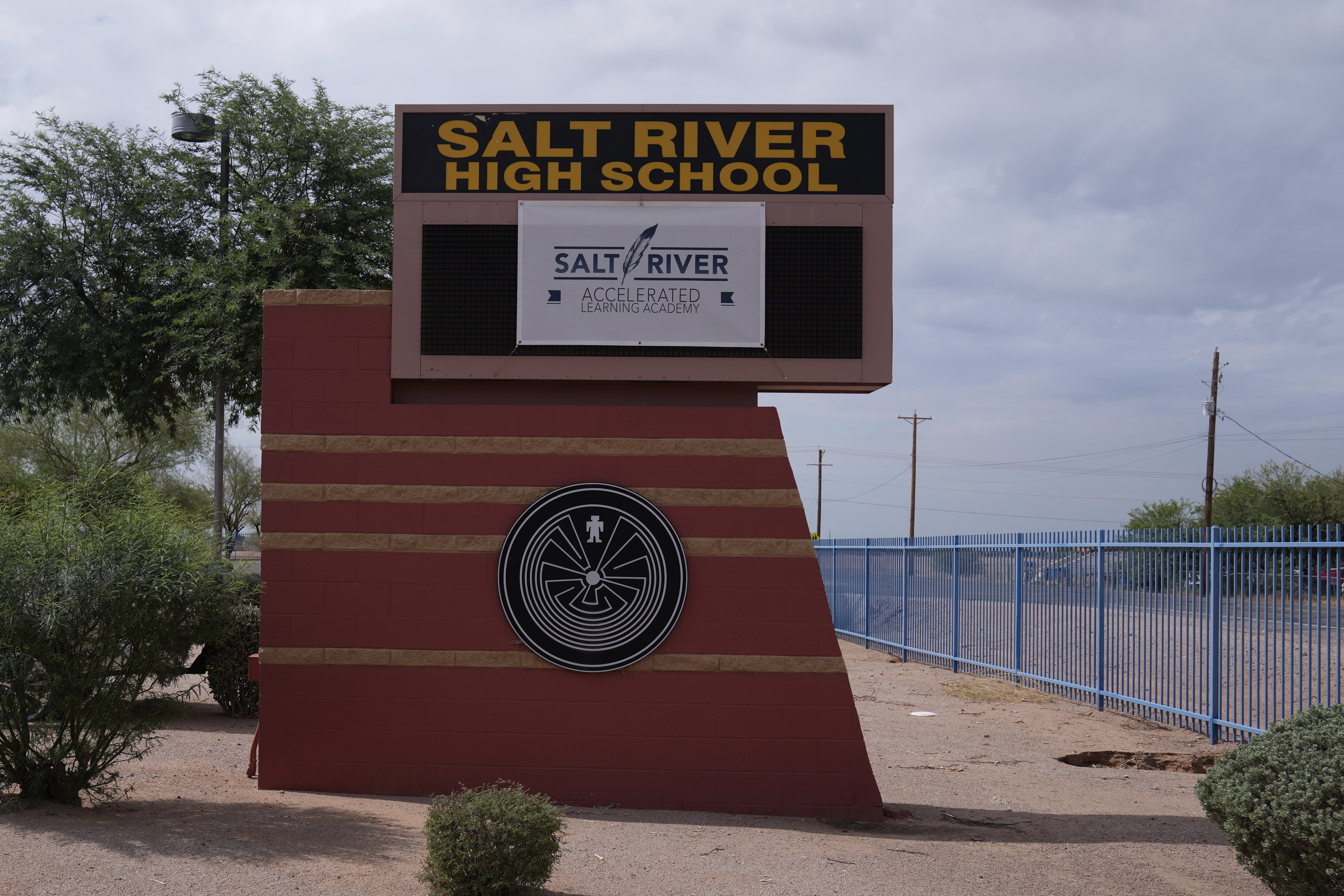
- Salt River High School

Location
- 4827 N. Country Club Dr. Scottsdale, Arizona 85256; United States; 33°30′31.69″N 111°50′21.72″W

Information
- School type: Public high school (charter)
- Established: 2004
- Status: Closed
- Closed: 2021
- School district: Salt River Pima-Maricopa Indian Community Education Department
- Grades: 7–12
- Enrollment: 225 (2017–18)
- Color: Black/gold/white
- Mascot: Eagle
- Website: web.archive.org/*/https://srhs.srpmic-ed.org/

Salt River High School (SRHS) was a high school on the Salt River Pima-Maricopa Indian Community near Scottsdale, Arizona. It was operated by that tribe's Education Department along with an early education/Head Start facility, elementary school, alternative school and higher education department. The high school opened in August 2004 with an award-winning campus and grounds. Salt River High School was located on a federally recognized Native American reservation, which provided students and families opportunities to learn and partake in the rich histories and contemporary experiences of both the O'Odham (Pima) and Piipaash (Maricopa) people who reside within and/or are members of the Salt River Pima-Maricopa Indian Community. Salt River High School was a member of the Canyon Athletic Association. This school closed its doors sometime in 2021.

== History ==
A charter school with secondary students, Desert Eagle School, opened in 1995. It was made up of portable buildings, and did not have an indoor cafeteria nor indoor athletic facilities. In 2000 the enrollment was 180, with 70% of the students being Native American. At that time, 50% of the Native Americans lived on the property of the Salt River reservation.

Desert Eagle was converted into Salt River High School, which opened in 2004. The campus cost $22 million and is red and yellow colored, in the shape of a "half-moon." It introduced the indoor dining and athletic facilities that the previous campus did not have. Circa 2004 the enrollment was about 300.

At some point in 2021 Salt River High closed, and its campus is now used as an alternative high school, Accelerated Learning Academy (ALA).

== Native Studies ==
Students learn the history and values of the Community, which are integrated into classroom. Students are exposed to the culture of the O'Odham and Piipaash people. Salt River High School students are also encouraged to share and participate in their culture in multiple ways both in and out of school.

All of the Salt River Schools network schools have coursework related to the Maricopa (Piipash) and O'odham peoples. In particular, in 2020, students in the seventh grade took mandatory O'odham language classes.

== Student Programs & Electives ==
Programs: Junior A.C.E, Salt River Police Explorer and S.T.E.P. Up Tutoring Program | Student Electives: Native Studies, Computer & Technology, ELA Enrichment Class (Grades 7 & 8), Health & Fitness, J.R.O.T.C., Journalism / Yearbook, Music, Peer Mediation, Robotics, Service Learning, Spanish, Student Council, Success 101, Theatre and Visual Art.

== Further media ==
- "Native ways taught at Salt River Schools". Cronkite News. November 22, 2019 – via YouTube.

== Gallery ==
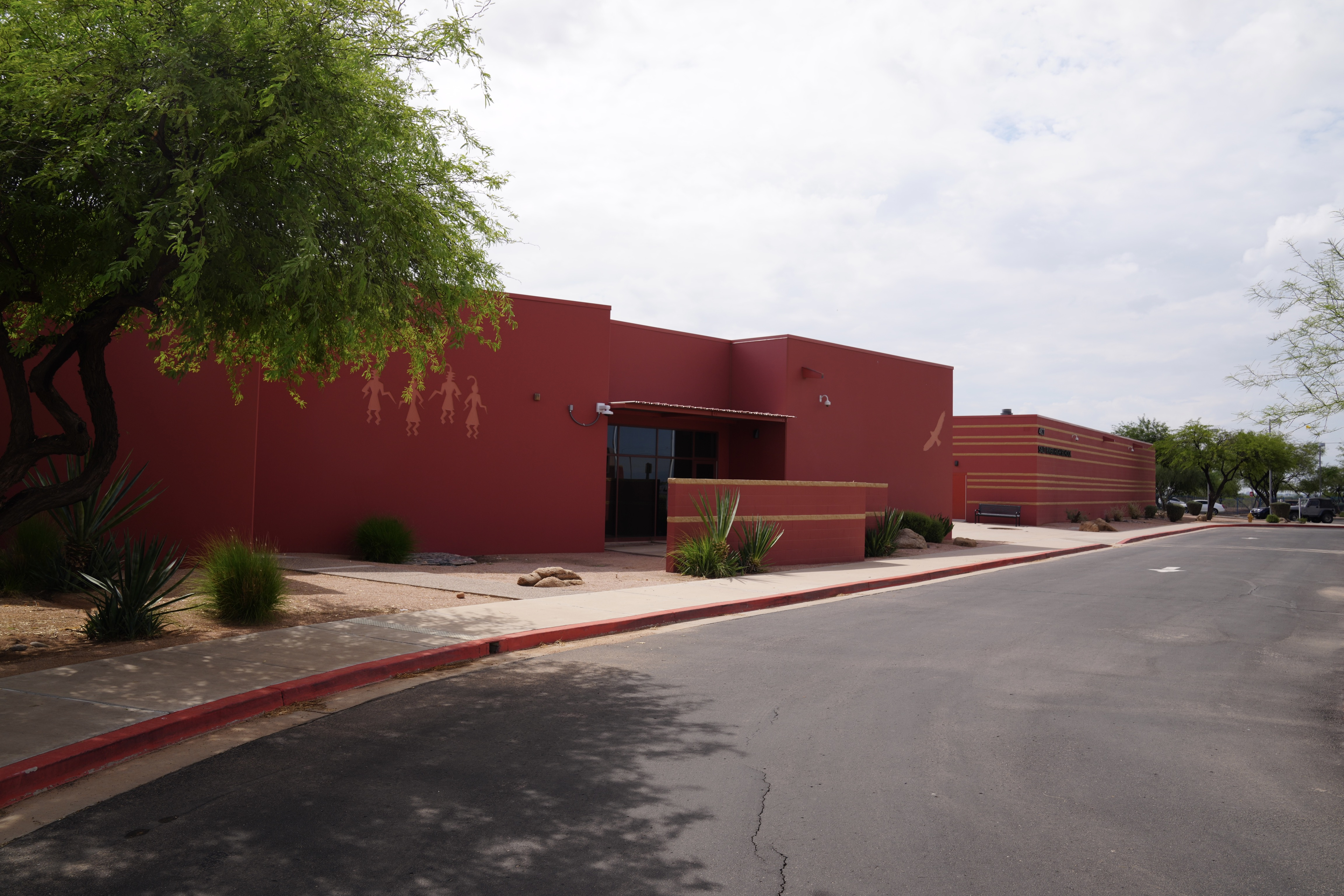
Salt River High School

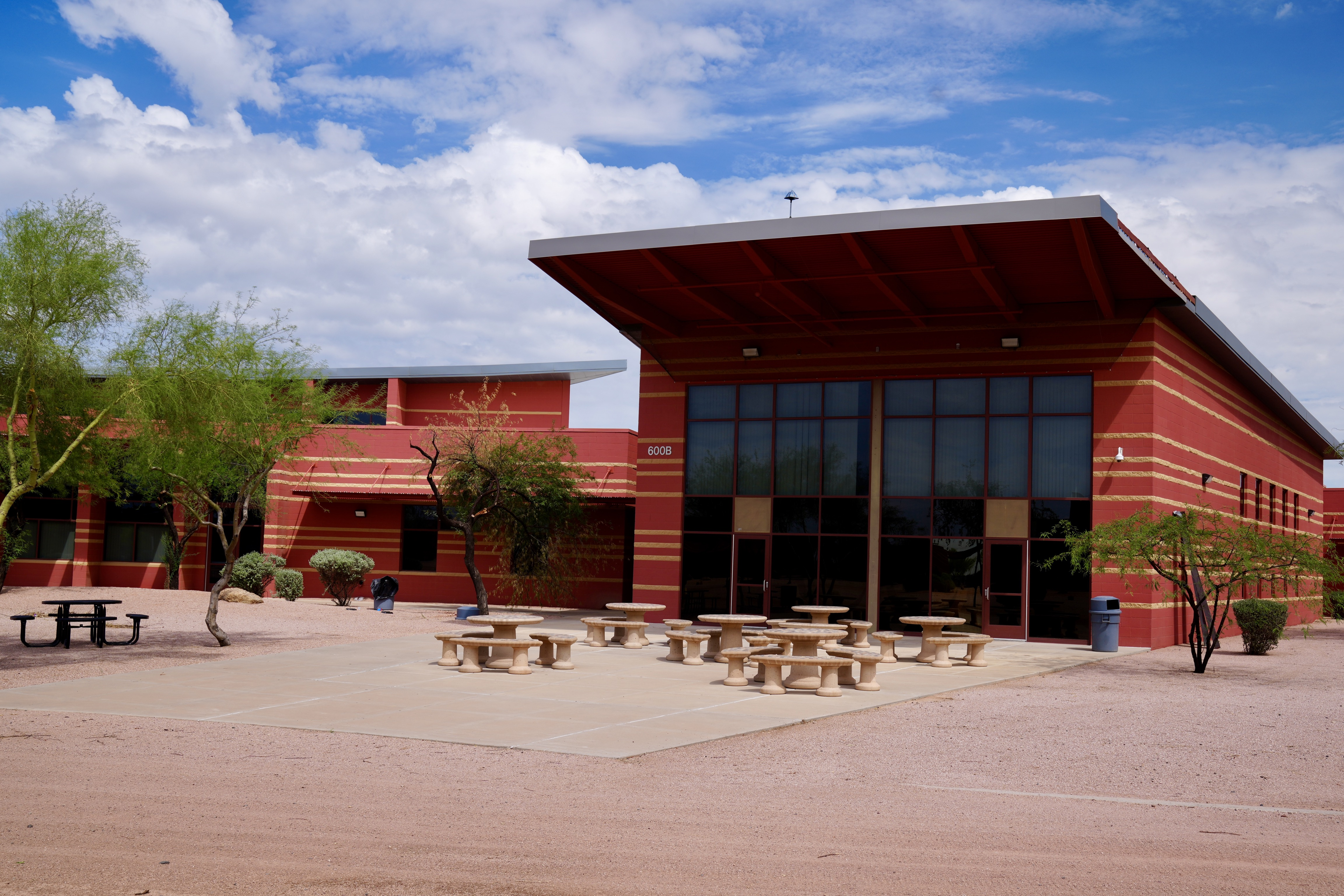
Salt River High School lunch area

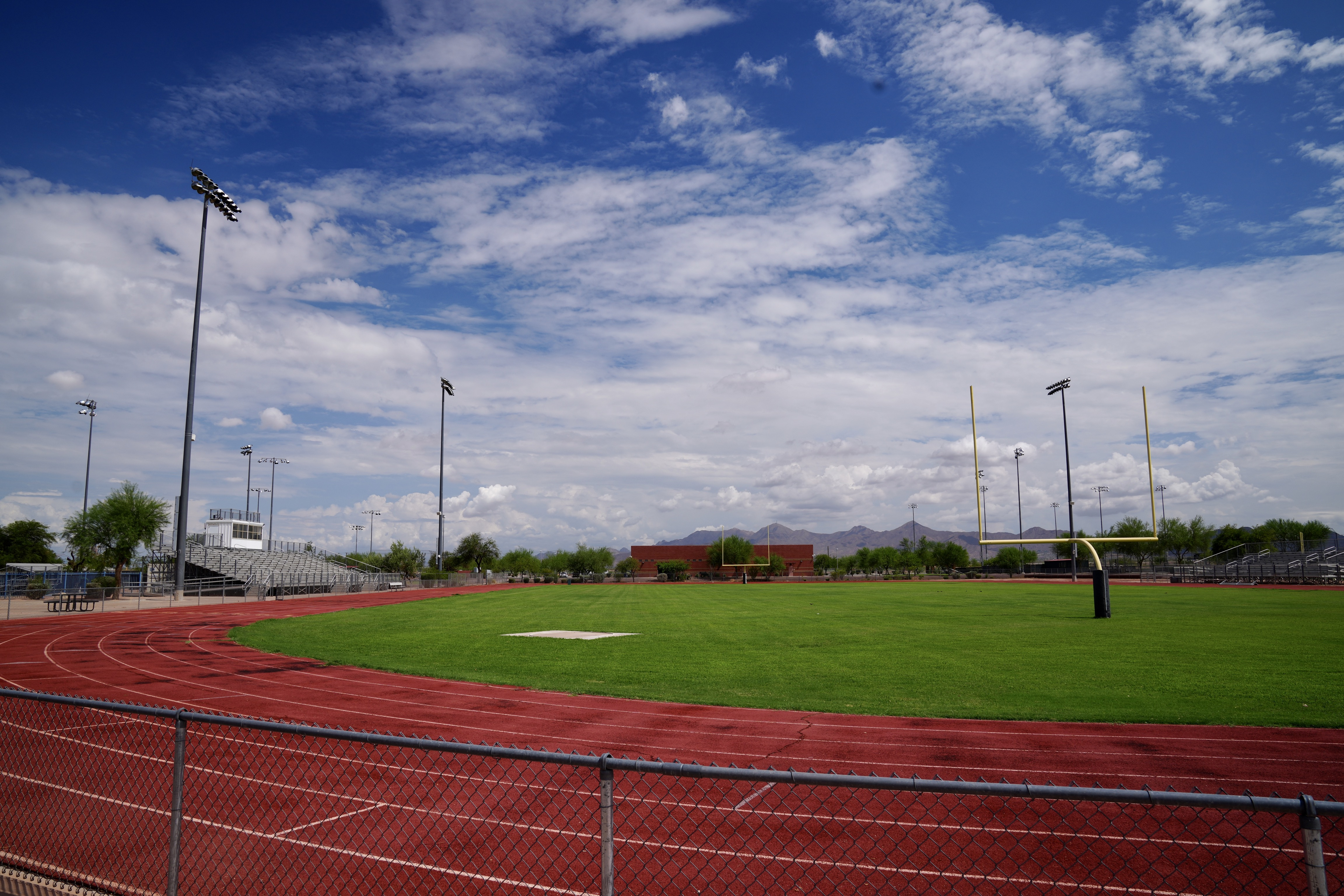
Salt River High School Sports Field

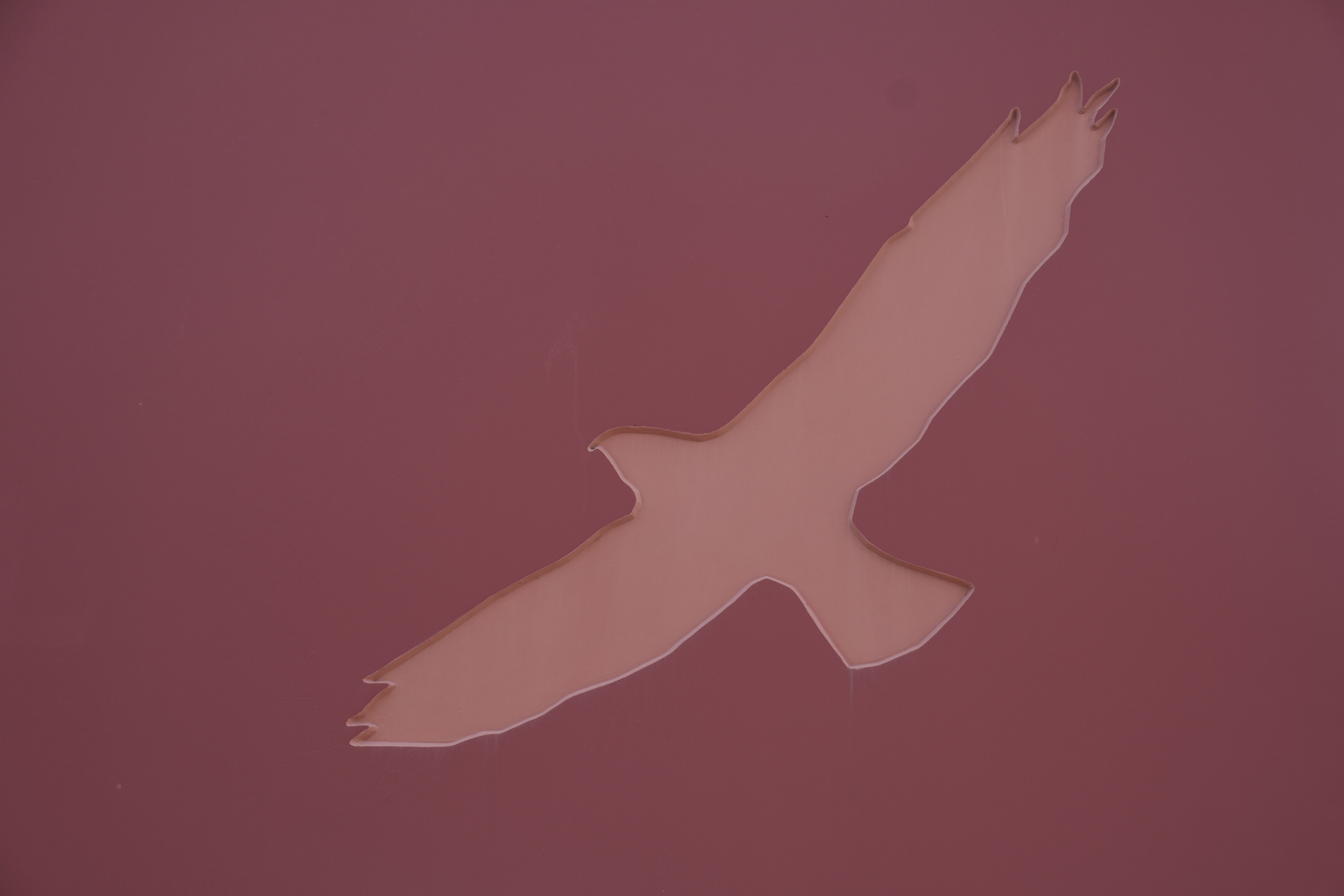
Salt River High School Eagles
