= Alta Vista High School (Arizona) =

Location
- 5040 S. Campbell Ave. Tucson, Arizona 85706; United States
- Coordinates: 32°09′40″N 110°56′40″W

Information
- School type: Public charter high school
- Established: 2004 (22 years ago)
- CEEB code: 030621
- Principal: Alicia Alvarez
- Grades: 9-12
- Enrollment: 472 (2023–2024)
- Colors: Purple, silver, white, and black
- Mascot: Lobos
- Accreditation: Cognia
- Website: www.altavistahs.com

Alta Vista High School is a public charter high school in Tucson, Arizona. It is operated by The Leona Group.
