= The Leona Group =

American charter school operating company

The Leona Group (TLG) is a private company operating charter schools in the states of Arizona, Indiana, Michigan and Ohio. It was founded in 1996 in Michigan by Dr. William Coats and operates 66 schools.

== History ==
In 1996, Cesar Chavez Academy in Detroit, Michigan, was the first charter school to partner with the Leona Group, initially serving students in grades K-5; it now serves more than 2,000 students in all grades at five Detroit campuses. The next year, The Leona Group expanded to Arizona and opened five charter high schools in metro Phoenix; it would relocate its headquarters to Arizona in 2000.

In 2001, the Leona Group broadened its reach to serve students in Ohio, beginning with Eagle Academy, which opened in Toledo. In 2002, three additional Leona Group schools opened in Toledo, along with the organization's first school in Fort Wayne, Indiana. The Leona Group has since expanded its operations in Arizona and moved into the Florida market.

In 2012, The Leona Group was selected to take over operation of the Highland Park, Michigan School District after it was ordered chartered by an emergency manager. Leona renamed the system to Highland Park Public School Academy System, but it continued to bleed students and run into a variety of headwinds. After the high school was shuttered in 2015, the last remaining school in the system, an elementary school serving grades K through 8, received an "F" grade from state authorities.

== Criticism and school performance ==
In 2013, Michigan education advocates criticized the Leona Group's operation of the Cesar Chavez Academy, finding that test scores in 2012 were lower than those of the public schools in Detroit. In 2014, CCA's original elementary school scored in the second percentile on state exams. Financial problems and sliding test scores prompted the closure of another Leona charter school in Detroit, Allen Academy, at the end of the 2015–16 school year, when the authorizing agent opted to terminate its relationship a year after broadening its relationship to incorporate other management companies.

In 2015, after it obtained an "F" rating from the state for the 2013–14 school year, the chartering agent of one of The Leona Group's schools in Fort Wayne, Indiana, Timothy L. Johnson Academy, threatened to close the school at the end of the year if improvements were not made. Ultimately, the school's charter was renewed for a two-year term.
