= List of charter schools in Arizona =

The following is a list of charter schools in Arizona (including networks of such schools) grouped by county, with the exception of Phoenix, Arizona, a city large enough to merit its own category.

== Cochise County ==
- Center for Academic Success Charter School
- Leman Academy of Excellence (Sierra Vista)
- Liberty Traditional Charter School (Douglas)
- Omega Alpha Academy

== Coconino County ==
- Flagstaff Arts and Leadership Academy
- Flagstaff Junior Academy
- Mountain Charter School
- Northland Preparatory Academy
- The PEAK School
- Pine Forest School

== Gila County ==
- Destiny School
- Liberty High School
- New Visions Academy

== Maricopa County (excluding Phoenix) ==
- American Leadership Academy
- American Virtual Academy
- Arizona Connections Academy
- Arizona Language Schools
- Arts Academy at Estrella Mountain
- Ball Charter Schools (Dobson, Val Vista)
- Benjamin Franklin Charter School
- Calibre Academy
- Cambridge Academy
- Candeo Schools
- Challenge Charter School
- Challenger Basic School
- Concordia Charter School
- Country Gardens Charter School
- Crown Charter School
- Desert Heights Charter Schools
- East Valley Academy and Crossroads
- Edkey Schools (George Washington, Pathfinder, Sequoia Eastmark, Sequoia Charter, Sequoia Verrado Way, Sequoia Choice, Sequoia Deaf, Sequoia Lehi, Sequoia Pathway)
- Eduprize Schools
- Ethos Academy
- FrenchAm Schools
- Gila Crossing Community School
- Great Hearts Academies (Archway Classical, Anthem Prep, Arete Prep, Chandler Prep, Glendale Prep, Lincoln Prep, Roosevelt, Scottsdale Prep, Trivium Prep)
- Happy Valley School
- Heritage Academy (Mesa, Arizona)
- Hirsch Academy
- Imagine Schools (East Mesa, Rosefield, Surprise)
- Incito Schools
- IntelliSchool (Chandler, Glendale)
- James Madison Preparatory School
- Kaizen Schools (Discover U, El Dorado, Gilbert Arts, Glenview Prep, Liberty Arts, Skyview, Vista Grove Prep)
- Leading Edge Academy
- Legacy Traditional Schools (Chandler, East Mesa, Gilbert, Glendale, Goodyear, Laveen, Mesa, North Chandler, Peoria, Surprise, West Surprise)
- Leman Academy of Excellence (Mesa)
- MASSA Academy of Math & Science (Avondale, Glendale, Mesa, Peoria,Power)
- The New School for the Arts and Academics
- New Horizon School for the Performing Arts
- Noah Webster Charter Schools
- Odyssey Prep Academy Schools
- Paradise Honors High School
- Pinnacle Charter Schools
- Polytechnic High School (Arizona)
- PPEP TEC High Schools
- Primavera Online High School
- Self Development Academy (East Mesa, Glendale, Mesa)
- Skyline Schools (AZ Compass Prep, Gila River, Vector Prep/Arts)
- Sonoran Schools(Paragon K-12, Chandler)
- Step Up Schools
- Student Choice High School
- Tempe Accelerated High School
- Tempe Preparatory Academy
- ThrivePoint High Schools

== Mohave County ==
- Desert Star Academy
- Kaizen Schools (Havasu Prep)
- Kingman Academy of Learning
- Masada Charter School
- Mohave Accelerated Learning Center
- Pillar Academy of Business & Finance
- Telesis Preparatory Academy
- Young Scholar's Academy

== Navajo County ==
- Edkey Schools (Sequoia Village)

== City of Phoenix ==
- ACCLAIM Academy
- All Aboard Charter School
- American Charter Schools Foundation (Alta Vista, Apache Trail, Crestview Prep, Desert Hills, Estrella, Peoria Accelerated, Ridgeview Prep, South Pointe, South Ridge, Sun Valley, West Phoenix)
- Arizona Agribusiness and Equine Center
- Arizona Language Preparatory
- Arizona School for the Arts
- ASU Preparatory Academy, Phoenix High School
- Ball Charter Schools (Hearn)
- Bennett Academy
- Career Success Schools
- CASA Academy
- Choice Academies
- Cornerstone Charter High School
- Deer Valley Academy
- EAGLE College Prep Schools
- Edkey Schools (AZ Conservatory, Caurus, Children First)
- Empower College Prep
- Espiritu Schools
- Freedom Academy
- Girls Leadership Academy of Arizona
- Great Hearts Academies (Archway Classical, Cicero Prep, Maryvale Prep, North Phoenix Prep)
- Horizon Honors Schools
- Imagine Schools (Academy of Phoenix, Bell Canyon, Camelback, Cortez Park, Desert West)
- IntelliSchool (Metro Center, Paradise Valley)
- International Commerce High School
- Kaizen Schools (Advance U, Leona Connected, Maya High, Quest, South Pointe, Summit)
- Legacy Traditional Schools
- Liberty Traditional Charter School
- Madison Highland Prep
- MASSA Academy of Math & Science (Camelback, Desert Sky, Flower, South Mountain)
- Metropolitan Arts Institute
- Midtown Primary School
- Milestones Charter School
- NFL YET
- North Pointe Preparatory
- Paideia Academy
- Painted Rock Academy
- Pan-American Charter School
- Pensar Academy
- Phoenix Advantage Charter School
- Phoenix College Preparatory Academy
- Phoenix International Academy
- Pioneer Preparatory School
- Premier High School
- Ridgeline Academy
- RSD High School
- Sage Academy
- Sonoran Schools (SSA Phoenix K-12)
- Scottsdale Country Day School
- Self Development Academy
- Skyline Schools (Skyline Prep, South Phoenix Prep/Arts, South Valley)
- Southwest Leadership Academy
- Stepping Stones Academy
- Synergy Public School
- Think Through Academy
- Valley Academy
- Victory Collegiate Academy
- Vista College Preparatory
- Western School of Science and Technology

== Pima County ==
- Academy Del Sol
- Academy of Building Industries
- Academies of Math & Science
- Academy of Tucson
- Accelerated Learning Laboratory
- Basis Schools
- Canyon Rose Academy
- Carden of Tucson Charter School
- CITY Center for Collaborative Learning
- Compass High School (Tucson, Arizona)
- CPLC Community Schools (Hiaki, Toltecalli)
- Desert Rose Academy Charter School
- Desert Sky Community School
- Edge High School
- Great Expectations Academy
- Highland Free School
- Legacy Traditional Schools (Northwest Tucson)
- Leman Academy of Excellence (Central Tucson, East Tucson, Marana, Oro Valley)
- MASSA Academy of Math & Science (MASSA, Prince)
- Mexicayotl Academy of Excellence
- Mountain Rose Academy
- Open Doors Community School
- Pima Rose Academy
- Satori School
- Sonoran Schools(SSA Tucson, SSA Tucson East, Daisy Early Learning Academy, Sonoran Virtual Academy)
- Southern Arizona Community Academy
- Southgate Academy
- Tucson Country Day School
- Tucson International Academy
- Tucson Preparatory School
- Vision Charter School

== Pinal County ==
- Apache Trail High School
- ASU Preparatory Academy, Casa Grande
- Avalon Elementary
- Grande Innovation Academy
- Imagine Schools (Avondale, Coolidge, Superstition)
- Kaizen Schools (Mission Heights Prep)
- Legacy Traditional Schools (Avondale, Casa Grande, Maricopa, Queen Creek)
- MASSA Academy of Math & Science (Avondale)

== Santa Cruz County ==
- Kaizen Schools (Colegio Petite)

Mexicayotl Academy

== Yavapai County ==
- Canyon View Preparatory Academy
- Desert Star Community School
- Edkey Schools (American Heritage Academy Camp Verde & Cottonwood)
- Franklin Phonetic Primary School
- La Tierra Community School
- Mingus Springs Charter School
- Mountain Oak Charter School
- Pace Preparatory Academy
- Park View Middle School
- Prescott Valley School
- Sedona Charter School
- Tri-City College Prep High School

== Yuma County ==
- Carpe Diem e-Learning Community
