= List of primary and secondary schools in Tucson, Arizona =

Primarily, students of the Tucson area attend public schools in the Tucson Unified School District (TUSD). TUSD has the second highest enrollment of any school district in Arizona, behind Mesa Unified School District in the Phoenix metropolitan area. There are also many publicly funded charter schools with a specialized curriculum.

== Public schools ==
School districts including portions of the city limits include: Tucson Unified School District, Flowing Wells Unified School District, Amphitheater Unified District, Sunnyside Unified School District, Vail Unified School District, and Sahuarita Unified School District.

District	Area(s) served
Altar Valley School District	Located southwest of the city, primarily serving Three Points.
Amphitheater Public Schools	Serves segments of the North Side, Casas Adobes, Catalina Foothills, and the communities of Oro Valley, eastern Tortolita and Catalina northwest of the city.
Catalina Foothills School District	Serves segments of the upper Catalina Foothills north of the city.
Continental School District	Serves the rural area south of Sahuarita.
Flowing Wells Unified School District	Serves segments of the North Side and the Northwest Side along I-10.
Marana Unified School District	Serves the town of Marana, Picture Rocks, Avra Valley and western Tortolita northwest of the city.
Sahuarita Unified School District	Located south of the city and serves Sahuarita and Arivaca.
Sunnyside Unified School District	Serves the far South Side and segments of the Southwest Side.
Tanque Verde Unified School District	Serves the far Northeast Side, including the community of Tanque Verde.
Tucson Unified School District	Encompasses the central Tucson valley, including the lower Catalina Foothills and segments of the Tanque Verde Valley. As the largest school district in Tucson in terms of enrollment, TUSD has 115 schools serving grades K–12.
Vail School District	Serves the far Southeast Side, including the community of Vail.

== Charter schools ==
Tucson is home to many taxpayer-supported public charter schools. Admission to these schools is determined by the school's open enrollment policy, subject to the criteria determined by Arizona statute, summarized by the Arizona State Board for Charter Schools.

- Academy of Math and Science, national Blue Ribbon elementary, middle and high school
- The Academy of Tucson (elementary, middle, and high school)
- AmeriSchools Academy, elementary, middle school,
- BASIS Charter School, a nationally ranked high school.
- Compass High School, specializing in vocational and arts training.
- Hermosa Montessori School.
- La Paloma Academy, an independent, non-profit school.
- Legacy Traditional Schools, traditional education focus K-8 charter school network since 2007
- Leman Academy of Excellence, a tuition-free classical charter school founded by Dr. Kevin Leman.
- Math and Science Success Academy, elementary school, sister school of the Academy of Math and Science
- Presidio School Tucson, a national Blue Ribbon elementary, middle and high school
- Rose Academies Public Charter High Schools (Canyon Rose Academy, Canyon Rose Academy East, Desert Rose Academy Charter School, Mountain Rose Academy, & Pima Rose Academy) have been a Tucson High School for over 15 years, and provides an alternative education setting in order to meet the unique demands of their students.
- Satori Charter School, an excelling school since 2005.
- Sky Islands Public High School,] offering an integrated curriculum with a focus on ecosystems
- Sonoran Science Academy, a nationally ranked college prep high school and an excelling school since 2003.
- Southern Arizona Community Academy, an accelerated, self-paced high school.

== Private schools ==
Tucson has several private schools:

- Desert Christian Schools (Arizona), a faith-based, for grades K–12.
- Fenster School, a boarding and day school
- Green Fields Country Day School, Southern Arizona's oldest independent school
- International School of Tucson, Independent school with an accelerated learning program and bi-lingual education for preschool through 5th grade, near the University of Arizona Campus.
- Kino Learning Center, a school that serves grades K–12 and follows the Progressive Education philosophies of A. S. Neill. has a schedule policy that allows students, to some extent, to choose their own classes. kino also has an animal center that, to this day, houses 3 sheep, a goat, and some number of chickens, there are also some animals inside.
- Our Mother of Sorrows Catholic School Our Mothers of Sorrows School is a kindergarten through eighth grade Catholic school, located on Tucson's east side of town, located on South Kolb road between 22nd Street and Golf Links Road. OMOSS teaches the common core with an emphasis on the Catholic religion. OMOSS as its referred offers various after school activities depending on the season, from violin to school sports, which are commonly held at Sal Pointe Catholic High School against other schools in the parish and state. OMOSS'S current principle is Mr. Keller who is leaving after the 2015- 2016 school year for a position at Saint Augustine High School, Vice Principal Vue is scheduled to take over with an outside search for a new vice principal.
- Pusch Ridge Christian Academy, a faith-based, school for grades 6–12.
- Salpointe Catholic High School
- San Miguel High School, College and Career preparatory high school located in the Roman Catholic Diocese of Tucson.
- Saint Augustine Catholic High School. Catholic High School for grades 9-12
- St.Cyril School of Alexandria, for grades K–8
- The Gregory School
- St. Michael's Parish Day School.
- Tucson Hebrew Academy, which has been awarded Blue Ribbon School of Excellence status.
- Tucson Waldorf School.
