= List of private schools in San Jose, California =

The following is a list of notable private schools in San Jose, California, USA (excluding those whose students finish before the fifth grade):

- Archbishop Mitty High School
- BASIS Independent Silicon Valley
- Bellarmine College Preparatory
- Cambrian Academy
- Campbell Christian Schools
- Challenger Schools
- Harker School
- Liberty Baptist School
- Notre Dame High School
- Presentation High School
- Saint Andrew's Episcopal School
- St Leo The Great School
- Valley Christian Schools
