= Basis Educational Group =

American for-profit education management organization

BASIS Educational Group, LLC
- Industry: for-profit education
- Headquarters: Scottsdale, Arizona
- Website: www.basised.com

BASIS Educational Group. LLC, styled BASIS.ed, is a for-profit education management organization based in Scottsdale, Arizona. It serves primarily BASIS Charter Schools, a non-profit charter management organization with offices in the same complex.

The BASIS Charter School network is organized by the regions in which the schools operate: BASIS Charter Schools, Inc, BTX Schools, Inc (Texas), BASIS D.C. (Washington D.C.), and BASIS Baton Rouge (Louisiana). In 2021, BASIS Charter Schools' 31 campuses enrolled 29,000 students. In 2018, BASIS Charter Schools claimed 29 schools and 17,000 students, which matches publicly available enrollment numbers from BASIS Charter Schools. In 2015, BASIS Charter Schools enrolled 12,014 students.

== BASIS Charter School locations ==
The locations of the BASIS Charter Schools are as follows.

=== Arizona ===
- BASIS Ahwatukee, Grades 4-12
- BASIS Chandler Primary North, Grades K-4
- BASIS Chandler Primary South, Grades K-4
- BASIS Chandler, Grades 5-12
- BASIS Flagstaff, Grades K-12
- BASIS Goodyear Primary, Grades K-5
- BASIS Goodyear, Grades 6-12
- BASIS Mesa, Grades K-12
- BASIS Peoria Primary, Grades K-4
- BASIS Peoria, Grades 5-12
- BASIS Phoenix Primary, Grades K-5
- BASIS Phoenix South, Grades K-9
- BASIS Phoenix, Grades 6-12
- BASIS Phoenix Central, Grades K-5
- BASIS Prescott, Grades K-12
- BASIS Scottsdale Primary East, Grades K-4
- BASIS Scottsdale Primary West, Grades K-4
- BASIS Scottsdale, Grades 5-12
- BASIS Tucson Primary, Grades K-4
- BASIS Tucson North, Grades 5-12
- BASIS Oro Valley Primary, Grades K-5
- BASIS Oro Valley, Grades 6-12

=== Louisiana ===
- BASIS Baton Rouge Materra Campus, Grade K-10 (As of 2024)
- BASIS Baton Rouge Mid City, Grade K-5

=== Texas ===
- BASIS Austin Primary, Grades K-2
- BASIS Austin, Grades 3-8
- BASIS Benbrook, Grades K-8
- BASIS Cedar Park, Grades K-11
- BASIS Pflugerville, Grades K-11
- BASIS San Antonio Primary Medical Center Campus, Grades K-5
- BASIS San Antonio Jack Lewis Jr., Grades K-9
- BASIS San Antonio Primary North Central Campus, Grades K-5
- BASIS San Antonio Northeast, Grades K-12
- BASIS San Antonio Shavano, Grades 6-12

=== Washington D.C. ===
- BASIS Washington D.C., Grades 5-12

== BASIS Independent School locations ==
BASIS Independent Schools are private, tuition-based schools owned by Spring Education Group and using the BASIS Curriculum.

=== New York ===
- BASIS Independent Brooklyn, Pre-K-Grade 12
- BASIS Independent Manhattan, Pre-K-Grade 12

=== California ===
- BASIS Independent Dublin, Grades 9-12
- BASIS Independent Silicon Valley, Grades 5-12 (San Jose, California)
- BASIS Independent Fremont, TK-Grade 12

=== Virginia ===
- BASIS Independent McLean, Age 2-Grade 12

=== Washington ===
- BASIS Independent Bellevue, Grades 3-8
- BASIS Independent Bothell, Grades K-12

== BASIS International School locations ==
There are currently BASIS International School locations in three countries.

=== China ===
- BASIS International School Shenzhen (Shenzhen)
- BASIS International School Guangming (Shenzhen)
- BASIS International School Guangzhou (Guangzhou）
- BASIS International School Park Lane Harbour (Huizhou）
- BASIS International School Hangzhou (Hangzhou)
- BASIS International School Nanjing (Nanjing)
- BASIS Bilingual School Shenzhen (Shenzhen)
- BASIS International School Chengdu (Chengdu）
- BASIS International School Wuhan (Wuhan）

=== Czech Republic ===
- BASIS International School Prague
- BASIS Beginners Prague

=== Thailand ===
- BASIS International School Bangkok

== Controversy ==
Critics observe that the relationship between BASIS Educational Group and BASIS Charter Schools is not arms-length. As a result, there is little financial transparency. An investigative article in 2010, when there were three schools in the network, rather than the 29 schools operating in the 2020-21 academic year, compared the founders' salary to the teachers and other public school administrators.

The schools have suffered high attrition rates (senior classes are typically a third to a quarter of the size of the fifth-grade class). Critics argue that BASIS achieves great test scores in part by weeding out underperforming students, which is illegal. BASIS has denied this and notes that it cannot legally "weed out" students at a public school—and there is no proof of such action.

In 2013, the District of Columbia Public Charter School Board rejected a request to expand, citing concerns about the high number of students who had withdrawn from the school since it opened.
