= Paladin Academy =

School in Pembroke Pines, Florida, United States

Location
- 14900 N.W. 20th Street; Pembroke Pines (Fort Lauderdale), (Broward County), Florida 33028; United States; 26.02675°N 80.34656°W

Information
- Former name: Developmental Resource Center
- School type: Private
- Established: 1978
- Founder: Dr. Deborah Levy
- Status: Closed
- Closed: June 2021
- School district: Broward County, South Florida
- Oversight: Spring Education Group
- School number: 4401
- CEEB code: 100673
- Grades: K - 12
- Gender: Co-Ed
- Age: 6 to 19
- Capacity: 130
- Average class size: 15
- Student to teacher ratio: 1:12
- Hours in school day: 6.5
- Campus: Suburban
- Campus size: 4.5 acres (18,000 m^{2})
- Colors: Navy Blue & Orange
- Accreditation: Southern Association of Colleges and Schools
- Website: www.paladinacademy.com

Paladin Academy was an elementary, middle and high school located in Pembroke Pines, Florida. The program catered to students who required smaller class sizes, a more structured environment and if needed, a slower academic pace. This included individuals diagnosed with attention deficits, dyslexia or other undiagnosed challenges. Accredited by the Southern Association of Colleges and Schools, the program was a participant in the State of Florida McKay Scholarship program for students with learning challenges. After over forty years of existence, the school ceased operations in June 2021.

== History ==
Founded in 1978, Dr. Deborah Levy opened the Developmental Resource Center (DRC) in the City of Hollywood in South Florida. The school started as an institution providing a clinical approach to students who suffered from numerous learning differences, helping them to overcome their challenges and gain the tools necessary to become successful academically. In 1998, Nobel Learning Communities purchased the program and renamed it Paladin Academy. The school offered a full college-bound high school program. It was originally accredited under the Commission on International and Trans-Regional Accreditation (CITA SACS) in 2004. With CITA's merger into AdvancED, the accreditation was revised to be under the Southern Association of Colleges and Schools (SACS CASI). In 2008, the school announced that it would be relocating to a facility in western Broward County, near the border of the City of Sunrise and the City of Weston. This move was completed in August of that same year.

In 2011, Paladin Academy started a phased move to a new 4.5-acre campus located in the City of Pembroke Pines. Featuring a regular soccer field, swimming facilities, two technology labs, a science lab, library indoor cafeteria and other numerous upgrades; lower grades of the school started the 2011–2012 academic year at the new location. The high school program, still operated out of the Weston Campus, completed the move in March 2012. Between 2011 and 2016, Paladin Academy won four national awards from Nobel Learning Communities for best operational and financial performance in the country.

In April 2018, the long-serving administrative team of Paladin Academy was fired due to business malpractice. Two months later, ownership of the school changed when Nobel Learning Communities was purchased by Spring Education Group. Changes at the school included a new motto of "Academic Success for Courageous Learners" and a new school mascot––the Paladin––which represented "Warriors for Peace and Kindness." 2019 and 2020 graduates reflected the highest post-secondary enrollment since the school began. Annual reports from Cognia Accreditation show Paladin Academy had 95 students enrolled in 2020.

Spring Education Group permanently closed Paladin Academy in June 2021. As of summer 2021, the property used by the school is owned by 425 Broadway Realty Corp.

== Curriculum ==
Paladin Academy utilized an individualized educational model commonly referred to as the Paladin program. Since the transfer of ownership in 1998, the methodologies and techniques used in helping students to overcome their learning challenges were implemented at other Nobel Learning Communities schools throughout the United States. However, a lack of priority for special needs programs by Spring Education Group discontinued most of these initiatives by 2019. From 2005 to 2021, the original Paladin Academy school was the only site to integrate the Paladin program with a college-bound regular high school diploma component. The Paladin program used multi-sensory strategies and specifically chosen support materials to teach, remediate, and facilitate students' individual learning. These strategies were designed to help children with learning challenges "learn how to learn." Included in these strategies were resources and techniques for improving the processing, reading, spelling, math, and language abilities of the students. In addition, the school held goal of helping students add study skills and organizational techniques to their arsenal of learning strategies.

== Sister schools ==
Two sister schools were opened under the name of Developmental Resource Center in the mid-1990s. Following the purchase of the school program in 1998 by Nobel Learning Communities, several additional campuses were put into operation. By 2006, these sister sites had been consolidated. Those schools included:

- Paladin Academy of Boca Raton, Florida
- Paladin Academy of Delray Beach, Florida
- Paladin Academy of Lynnwood, Washington
- Paladin Academy of Miami, Florida
