= Basis Schools =

Primarily Arizonan charter school operator

BASIS Curriculum Schools, Inc.
- Formation: November 1998 (27 years ago)
- Founder: Michael and Olga Block
- Founded at: Tucson, AZ
- Type: 501(c)(3)
- Tax ID no.: 86-0908854
- Revenue: $176,000,000 (2024)
- Website: basiscurriculumschools.com/home.php

BASIS Curriculum Schools, Inc. is a global network of public and private schools that use the BASIS Curriculum. BASIS Curriculum Schools are made up of BASIS Charter Schools, BASIS Independent Schools, and BASIS International Schools.

== History ==
The first BASIS Curriculum School, BASIS Tucson, was founded in Tucson in 1998 by Michael Block and Olga Block, intending to educate students at an internationally competitive level.

In 2003, BASIS Scottsdale was opened. In 2010, BASIS Oro Valley was founded. A year later, BASIS opened three schools at once in Chandler, Peoria, and Flagstaff. BASIS continued its expansion by opening another school in Tucson and one in Phoenix proper in fall 2012, along with their first non-Arizona school, located in Washington, D.C. In 2013, BASIS opened its tenth and eleventh Arizona campuses in Ahwatukee and Mesa, and the second non-Arizona campus was added in San Antonio, Texas. BASIS also began its primary (K-4) program at the original BASIS Tucson site. In 2014, BASIS opened in Prescott, AZ. In 2015, BASIS opened its sixteenth Arizona school in Goodyear, AZ. In the following year, BASIS Independent McLean opened in McLean, VA.

BASIS was featured in the documentary film 2 Million Minutes: A 21st Century Solution, which examined differences between charter schools' curricula and conventional public schools. In response to the documentary, Newt Gingrich and Al Sharpton visited a BASIS campus to deliver speeches on the importance of education in America. In April 2019, the five independent BASIS Schools in New York, California, Washington, and Virginia were purchased by Spring Education Group. BASIS Independent Bellevue was opened in Washington state for the 2022-2023 school year.

== Management ==
BASIS Curriculum Schools are managed by BASIS Educational Group, LLC (stylized as BASIS.ed), a for-profit charter management organization based in Scottsdale, Arizona. BASIS Curriculum Schools seek to prepare students, in the elementary through high school level, to be competitive globally. This is done through extended homework hours, lecture-driven classes, an emphasis on success in standardized tests, like Advanced Placement tests, and an opportunity to graduate early or complete a senior project.

== Education model ==
BASIS Curriculum Schools utilize a LET/SET model for PreK-4th grade education. The term LET stands for Learning Expert Teachers, who serve as homeroom teachers and accompany students throughout the day. SETs are Subject Expert Teachers who teach individual subjects. Once a child enters the middle school program in 5th grade, LETs are no longer utilized and students no longer have a homeroom and instead navigate between classes on their own.

== Locations ==
As of August 2025, the company lists 54 BASIS Curriculum schools. 34 of these are public charter schools found in Arizona, Louisiana, Texas and Washington, D.C. Six of these are private BASIS Independent Schools found in New York City, Northern Virginia, Silicon Valley, California and Bellevue, Washington State. 14 are privately owned international schools found in China, Bangkok, Thailand and the Czech Republic.

== Successes ==
BASIS schools have regularly topped U.S. national school rankings, earning the top five spots and more among the U.S. News & World Report Best High Schools 2017 rankings, and earning the number one spot on the list of America's Most Challenging High Schools published by The Washington Post. In particular, BASIS schools are often top-ranked for STEM. Eight of BASIS' charter schools - BASIS Ahwatukee (#2), BASIS Chandler (#3), BASIS Scottsdale (#5), BASIS Peoria (#8), BASIS Tuscon North (#9), BASIS Phoenix (#15), BASIS Pro Valley (#16), and BASIS Goodyear (#18) - rank in the top 20 of US News and World Reports' 2026-2027 ranking of top US public schools for STEM.

== Controversy ==
Both BASIS schools and their parent organization have been criticized and controversial. Critics contend that BASIS fails to provide adequate financial transparency and accountability as it uses for-profit management companies. Another investigative article in 2010 questioned the founders' salary compared to the teachers and other public school administrators.

Other critics take issue with BASIS's accelerated curriculum and general educational philosophy. Some argue that BASIS focuses too much on standardized testing. Critics also point out that BASIS's performance in national ranking systems like the U.S. News & World Report is largely a function of BASIS's singular focus on mandatory Advanced Placement (AP) testing, as these ranking systems give great weight to the percentage of students at a school that take the AP tests. Critics also take issue with BASIS's attrition rates (senior classes are typically a third to a quarter of the size of the fifth-grade class) and argue that BASIS achieves good test scores in part by weeding out under-performing students. In 2013, the District of Columbia Public Charter School Board rejected a request from BASIS DC to expand, citing concerns about the high number of students who had withdrawn from the school since it opened.

Arizona BASIS schools solicit contributions from parents, an unusual practice for publicly funded schools. BASIS Scottsdale asks $1,500 per student. BASIS teachers make less than the average public school teachers in the state, although BASIS.ed contends that bonuses make teacher compensation competitive. Teachers typically receive bonuses for students' scores on Advanced Placement exams.

In 2023, the New York Post published an article alleging that Fred Zuliu Hu, the CEO of Primavera Capital Group, which controls Spring Education Group, was a previous one-time senior member of the Chinese Communist Party (CCP). As a result, Florida's Department of Education suspended scholarships to other schools owned by Spring Education group. Primavera Capital Group responded, claiming the “characterization of Fred Hu in the article is incorrect. He is not a member of the CCP or any other political party. He was not a CCP member at the time when he was an executive at Goldman Sachs.”
