= Power up =

Power up may refer to:

- Power-up, a video gaming term
- FIRST Power Up, the 2018 FIRST Robotics Competition game
- POWER UP, an American nonprofit organization
- "Power Up" (song), a 2018 song by Red Velvet from their EP Summer Magic
- Power Up (album), 2020 studio album by AC/DC
- Power Up Tour, a 2024 tour by AC/DC
- PowerUP (accelerator), accelerator boards for Amiga computers
- Power Up! Software, a defunct American productivity software publisher
