= Polytechnic High School (Arizona) =

Coordinates: 33.3051°N 111.6729°W

Location
- 7350 E Innovation Way South; Mesa, Arizona 85212; United States

Information
- School type: Public Charter, high school
- Established: 2010
- School board: Arizona State University Preparatory Academy
- NCES District ID: 040085903251
- Principal: Emma Popish
- Grades: 9–12
- Enrollment: 463 (2023-2024)
- Language: English
- Colors: ASU Maroon, ASU Gold
- Mascot: Sun Devils
- Website: Polytechnic High School

Arizona State University, Polytechnic High School is a public charter University-preparatory school, located in Mesa, Arizona, United States. The Polytechnic High School and STEM Academy (the latter of which serves as an elementary and middle school) is located on the Arizona State University Polytechnic campus next to the Phoenix-Mesa Gateway Airport.

The Arizona State University, Polytechnic High School is part of a series of preparatory schools for Arizona State University, including ASU Preparatory Academy, Phoenix, ASU Preparatory Academy, Casa Grande and ASU Prep Digital.

This ASU Polytechnic High School currently enrolls students in grade 7 through 12. The school offers various subjects and college opportunities to support student learning and academic development. It also offers the Cambridge curriculum, which prepares students for university- level coursework and allows some students to enroll in university classes by their junior year of high school.

As of 2020, the current director of secondary learning, a figure similar to a principal, is Stephen Rothkopf, with Amanda Wojtalik serving as the dean of students.

As of the start of the 2019–2020 school year, ASU Preparatory Academy Polytechnic High School enrolled 8th grade students as part of their high school attendance, however as of the 2020–2021 school year, 7th graders have also been added to the school attendance.

== History ==
ASU Preparatory Polytechnic High School was founded in 2008 under the name of University Public Schools Inc. (UPSI). The Polytechnic school was the first ASU Prep school, and was located in Mesa, Arizona. The next campus created was the downtown Phoenix campus.

ASU Prep Polytechnic was certified as a STEM school by AdvancEd, making it one of only two schools in Arizona to be given that accreditation, and one hundred in the United States. The strongest factor in AdvancEd's decision to give the Polytechnic school this certification was their conversations with the school's students during their certification visit.

In 2018, many improvements were made to the Polytechnic High School's campus, including a brand new two-story building with wet labs, administration spaces, ten new classrooms, and a "makerspace" with a variety of tools and resources for students to complete engineering-related projects. The Sacaton Hall building, which previously housed the school's administration space, was then used entirely for classrooms. In 2020, the Sacaton Hall began to be used entirely for seventh and eighth graders, who make up the school's "Spark Institute."

== Academics ==
Given its STEM school certification, ASU Preparatory Academy Polytechnic High School has a curriculum that is heavily based on science, technology, engineering, and math. The school is a college preparatory school, and allows students to take free Arizona State University classes for college credit when they are ready. ASU Prep Polytechnic also utilizes the Cambridge Curriculum, which is present in over 160 countries worldwide. For many Cambridge classes, students will take assessments at the end of the year that may give them the opportunity to earn college credit.

== Extracurricular activities ==
ASU Preparatory Polytechnic High School offers a variety of clubs, including Student Government, Key Club, Cultural Diversity Club, Robotics, National Honor Society, National Junior Honor Society, and News Junkies.

Other clubs such as Fencing Club, Ping Pong Club, and Lightning McQueen Club have been founded at ASU Prep Polytechnic by students for periods of time but are not currently active.

ASU Preparatory Polytechnic High School offers clubs that allow students to serve their community, such as Key Club, Cultural Diversity Club, and National Honor Society. Polytechnic High School's Key Club chapter hosts events at which members can give back to their community. Similarly, the Polytechnic High School chapter of National Honor Society requires members to participate in and keep track of community service throughout the school year. The Cultural Diversity Club aims to educate students about different cultures while also offering events related to community service.

Polytechnic High School's Student Council, shortened as "StuCo," is made up of representatives and leaders from each grade in the High School, not including 7th and 8th grades. According to its website, the Student Council "contributes to the needs of the community, upholds the pillars of ASU Preparatory Academy, represents the needs of the student body, and encourages student involvement and school pride."

The Polytechnic High School's robotics team competes in the annual FIRST Robotics Competition. The current team name is "Some Assembly Required," and its assigned number is 4111. Team 4111's rookie year was 2012, and since then it has competed at 11 different events in Arizona, including 3 state championships, in 2016, 2018, and 2019. The team's highest placement was in 2018, where it was ranked 27th at the Arizona State Championship during the FIRST Power Up season.

The News Junkies club allows students to create videos about important school announcements in order for students to be knowledgeable on upcoming events, changes, and other significant things going on at the Polytechnic High School. News Junkies has included actor and director Sean Astin as a recurring guest in several of their videos.

== Athletics ==
Polytechnic High School teams compete in the Canyon Athletic Association.

The ASU Prep Color Guard is a notable award-winning sport on campus. The K-12 program has 5 teams: ASU Sparkys (Kindergarten-2nd Grade), ASU Maroon (3rd-4th Grade), ASU Gold (5th-6th Grade), ASU Black (JV, 6th-12th Grade), and ASU Sun Devils (Varsity, 6th-12th Grade). The Color Guard competes in the Winter Guard Arizona (WGAZ) circuit.
