= Arizona State University Polytechnic campus =

Public university campus in Mesa, Arizona, US

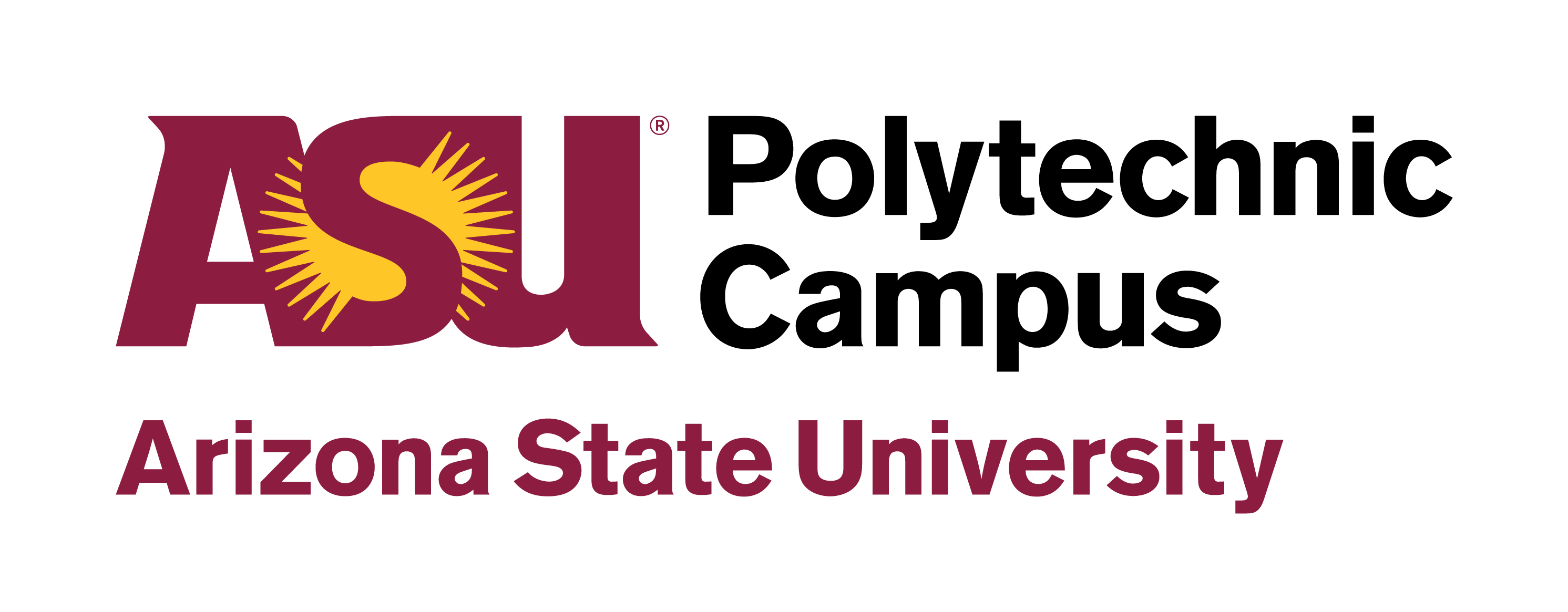
- Type: Campus of Arizona State University
- Established: 1996
- Students: 8,283 (Spring 2009)
- Location: Mesa, Arizona, United States; 33°18′25″N 111°40′42″W
- Campus: Suburban 612.99 acres (2.4807 km^{2})
- Website: campus.asu.edu/polytechnic

Arizona State University Polytechnic Campus is one of four campuses of Arizona State University, located in Mesa, Arizona. Founded as ASU East, the campus opened in fall 1996 on the former Williams Air Force Base in southeast Mesa.

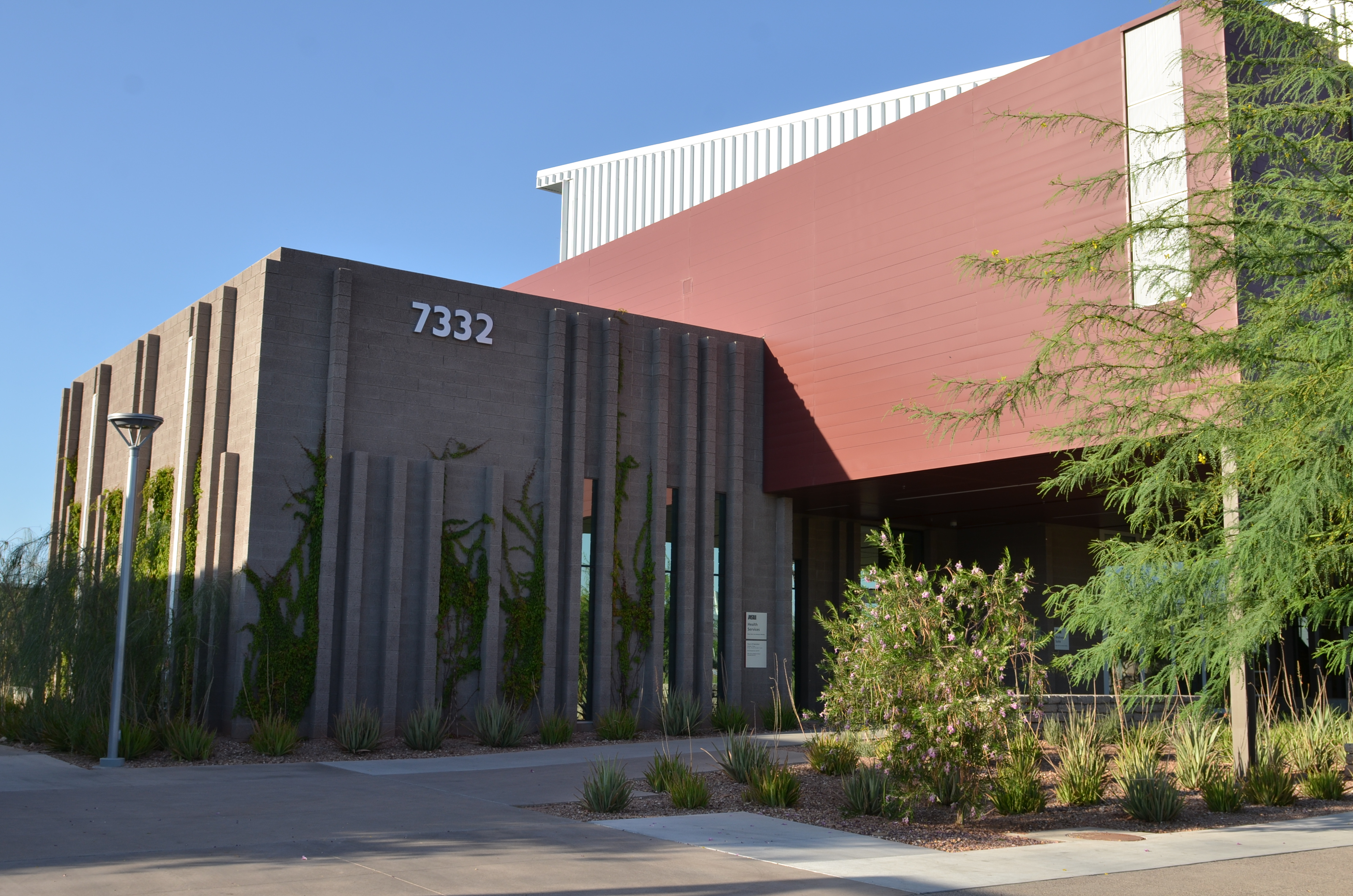
The entrance to the Sun Devil Fitness Complex

== History ==
The campus opened with nearly 1,000 students enrolled in one of the eight degrees offered. The campus started with two schools — the School of Technology and the School of Management and Agribusiness. East College was added in 1997 as an incubator for new professional programs.

More than 8,000 students are enrolled in 40 degree programs based on the campus. ASU shares around 600 acres (2.4 km^{2}) at Power and Williams Field roads with Chandler–Gilbert Community College, Mesa Community College, Embry-Riddle Aeronautical University, a United States Air Force research laboratory, Arizona State University Preparatory Academy for PK-8), Polytechnic High School, and the Silvestre Herrera Army Reserve Center. Together, these entities make up what is known as the Williams Campus.

In July 2005, the ASU campus changed its name from ASU East to ASU Polytechnic.

In the Fall 2008 semester a major expansion project at the campus was completed and open to students in the form of the new Polytechnic Academic Complex. It is located in the heart of campus and combines new student housing with classrooms and administrative offices in an open air building environment. The three new buildings cost a combined $103 million and cover 240,000 square feet (22,000 m^{2}). It was built by main contractor DPR and designed by RSP Architects (Architect-of-Record) in collaboration with Sam Luitio-based Lake|Flato (Design Architect) and is a LEED v2.2 Gold certified project.

== Academics ==
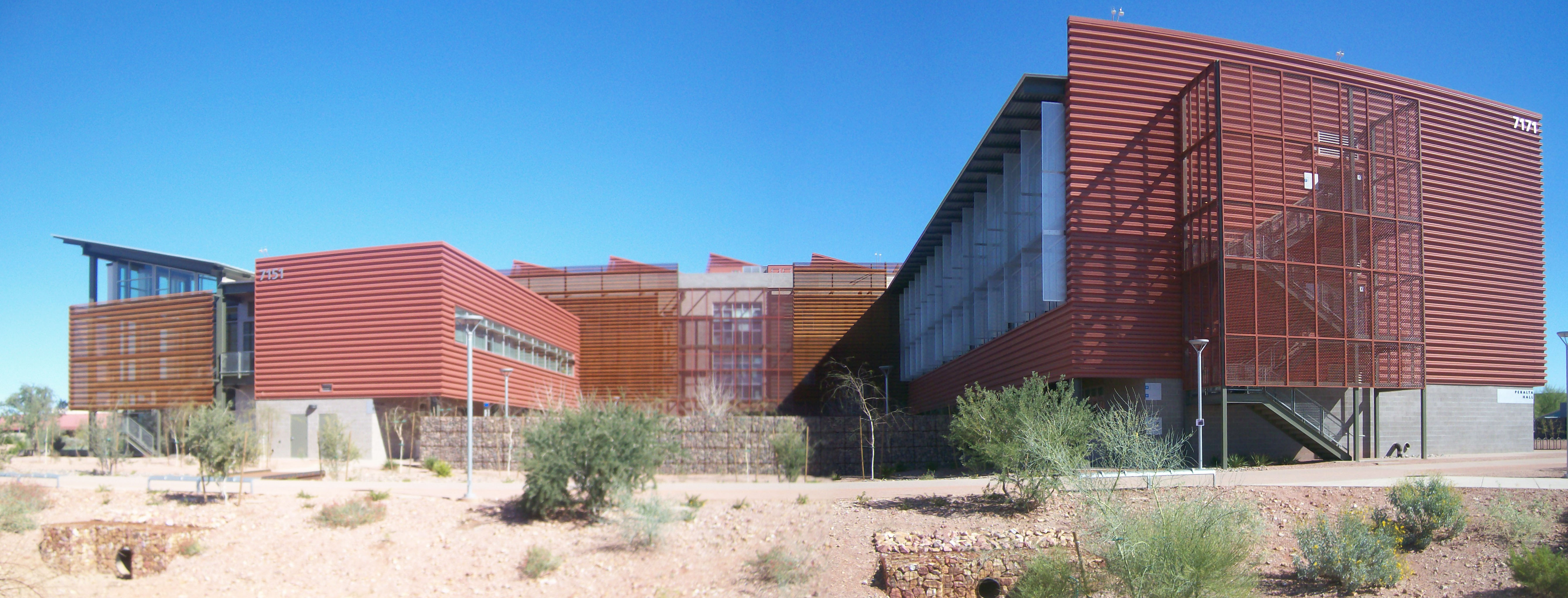
Looking east at the Picacho Hall (left) and Peralta Hall (right) buildings

=== College of Technology and Innovation ===
The College has nearly 40 facilities, centers and laboratories for student work and faculty research. Facilities such as the Altitude Chamber, Flight Simulator Labs, Digital Printing Lab, Photovoltaics Testing Lab, Microelectronics Teaching Factory and Haas Technical Center. In 2013, the College of Technology and Innovation was dismantled and programs were divided into the College of Letters and Sciences, now known as the College of Integrative Science and Arts, and The Polytechnic School.

=== W.P. Carey School of Business (Morrison School of Management and Agribusiness) ===
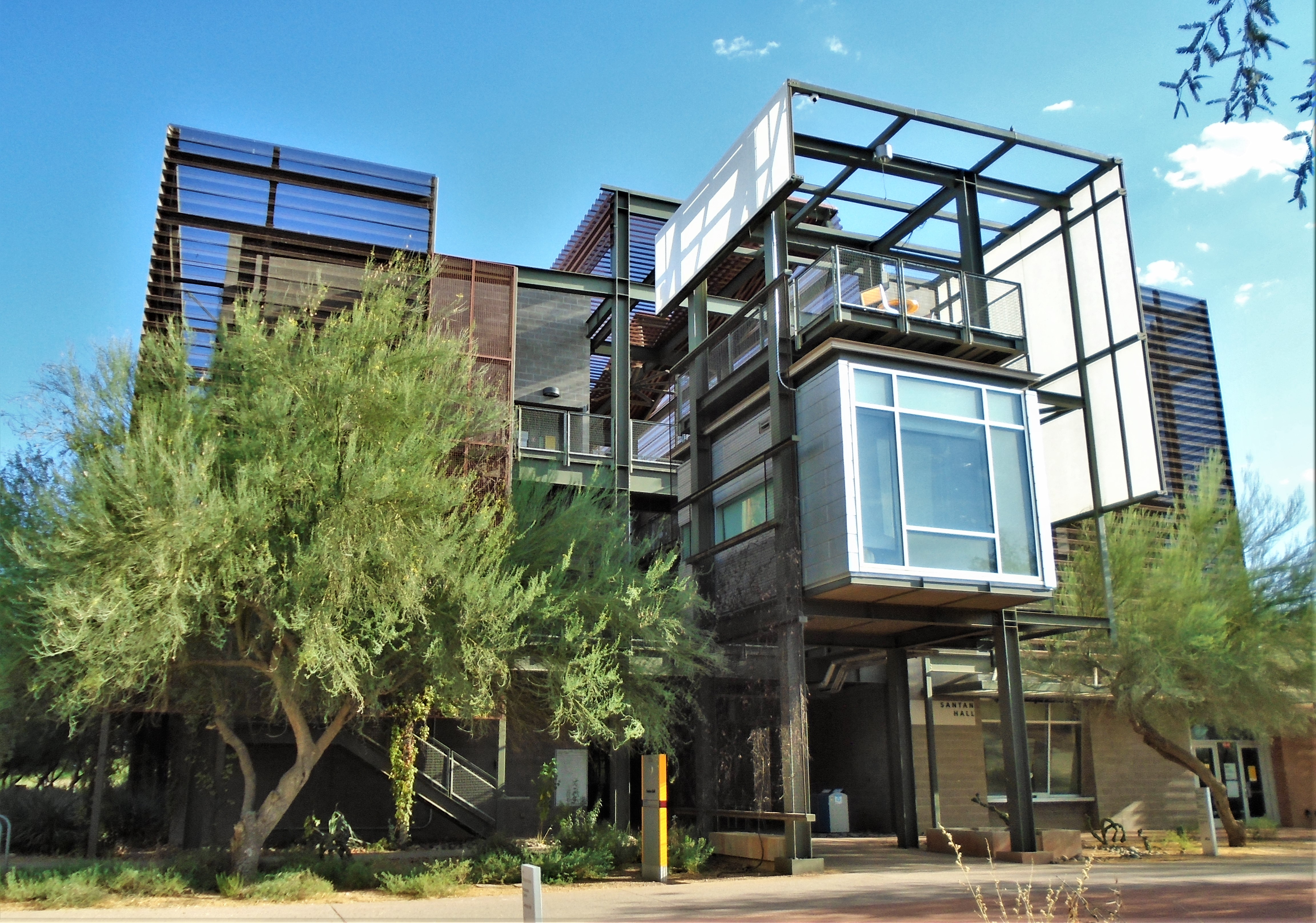
Santan Hall houses the W. P. Carey School of Business

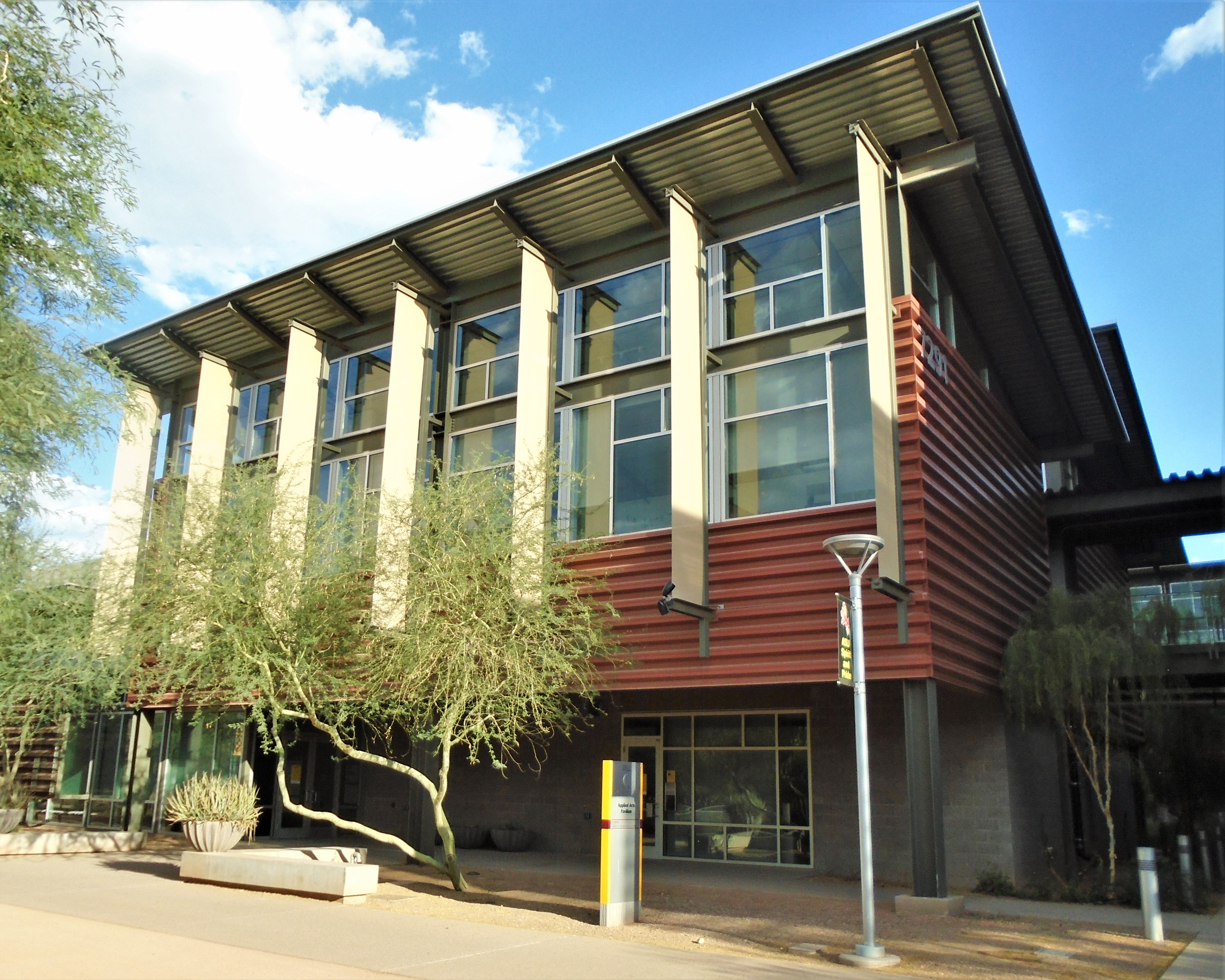
The Applied Arts Pavilion

The school was named in 1998 in honor of ASU Alums Marvin and June Morrison for their gift of a large acre of farmland to the school and their ongoing support of Arizona State University.

=== College of Integrative Sciences and Arts ===
The College of Integrative Sciences and Arts (CISA) is a hub for career-connected learning offering many degree programs with an applied emphasis across the sciences, humanities and social sciences. CISA serves its majors at the Polytechnic campus, Downtown Phoenix campus, Tempe campus, through ASU Online and ASU Local, at ASU's Colleges in Lake Havasu City and through ASU partnership degree programs at select community college locations: ASU at Cochise, ASU at Pima, ASU at Pinal, ASU at The Gila Valley, ASU at Yavapai and ASU at Yuma.

CISA is made up of three schools, each offering distinctive degree programs and core curricula to meet the needs of its majors as well as the general education needs of students in other ASU colleges and schools. These schools include the School of Applied Professional Studies, School of Applied Sciences and Arts, and School of Counseling and Counseling Psychology. CISA is also home to ASU's Office for Veteran and Military Academic Engagement.

=== Mary Lou Fulton Teachers College ===
The Mary Lou Fulton Teachers College offers programs leading to the B.A., M.Ed., and Ed.D. in many fields, such as early childhood education, elementary education, secondary education, special education, and educational administration/supervision. Headquartered on ASU's West campus, the Teachers College administers education programs on all four ASU campuses.

=== Graduate College ===
The Graduate College administers graduate programs on all four ASU campuses.

=== Honors College ===
The Barrett Honors College provides academically-intensive programs and courses for undergraduate students meeting select criteria. Barrett's programs are offered to students across all four ASU campuses.

=== University College ===
The University College offers general-studies programs and exploratory programs for undergraduate students who have not declared a formal major.

=== The Polytechnic School ===
The College of Technology and Innovation (CTI) was an academic unit at the Polytechnic campus. It was the sole academic unit at the campus after 2009. In 2014, the university announced that CTI would merge with the Ira A. Fulton Schools of Engineering, becoming the Polytechnic School within that academic unit.

The Polytechnic School was founded in 2013 after the dismantling of CTI, and offers 11 undergraduate degrees and 10 graduate degrees, including degrees in ASU's aviation program. The director of the Polytechnic School is Kurt Paterson.

== On-campus housing ==
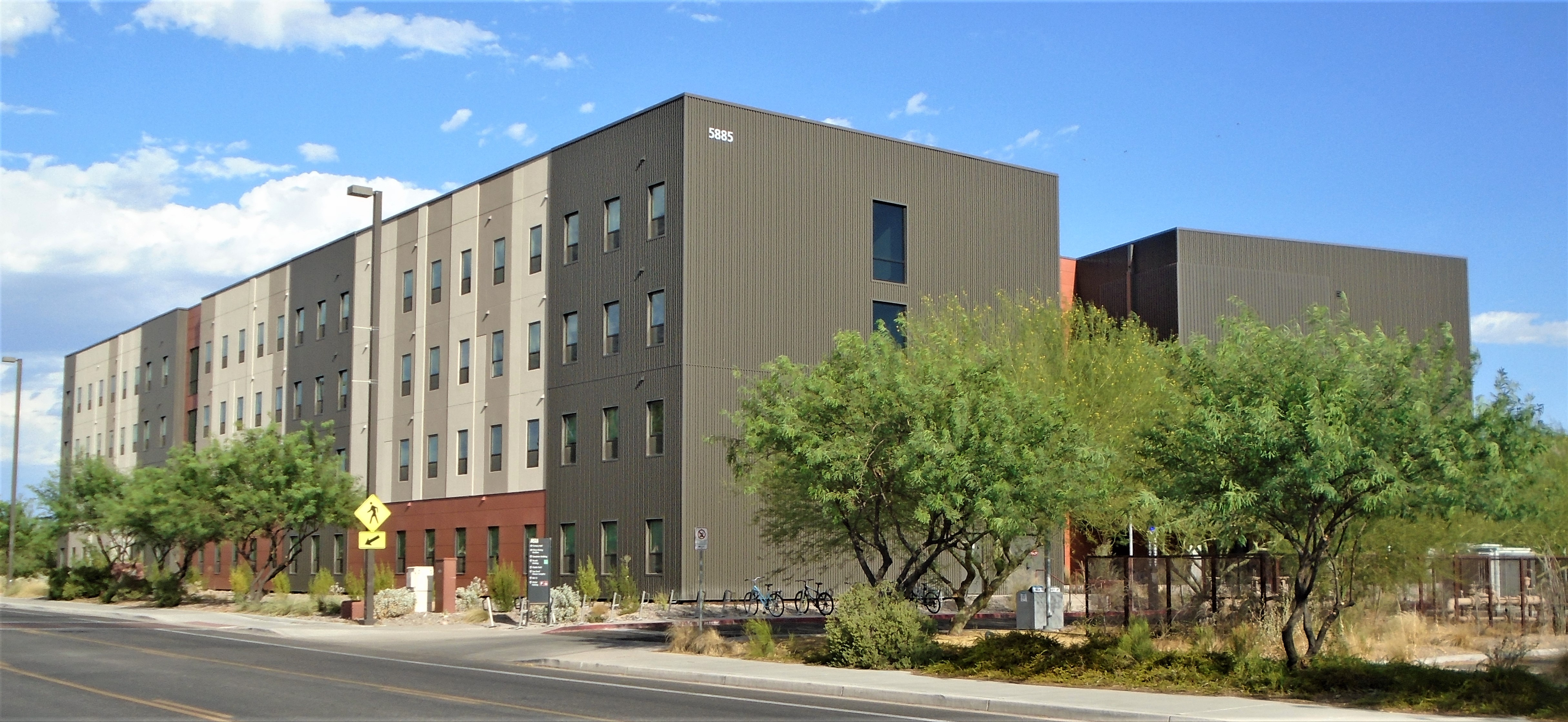
Lantana Hall is LEED Platinum certified

=== Active residence halls ===
- Lantana Hall (completed Fall 2020)
- Century Hall (built 2012)
- Palo Blanco Hall (retired 2020 but later reactivated 2025)

=== Retired residence halls ===
- Dean Hall (Demolished)
- Bell Hall (Demolished)
- Eagle Hall
- Falcon Hall
- Mustang Hall
- Phantom Hall
- Talon Hall

=== Desert Villages ===
The ASU Desert Villages are made up of apartment style houses located on the outside edges of campus. Like much of the campus, these houses were originally part of the Williams Air Force Base. The houses have 2-3 bedrooms, are fully furnished, and include a kitchen. The villages are run by ASU Housing and the front desk fis located at Quad 3.

The Desert Villages include:

- North Desert Village
- West Desert Village
- South Desert Village (retired)
