= ASU Preparatory Academy, Phoenix High School =

Coordinates: 33.4534°N 112.0636°W

Phoenix High School

Location
- 735 E Fillmore St; Phoenix, Arizona 85006; United States

Information
- School type: Public Charter, high school
- School board: Arizona State University Preparatory Academy
- Grades: 9–12
- Language: English
- Colors: Red and yellow
- Website: Phoenix High School

ASU Preparatory Academy, Phoenix High School is a University-preparatory school within the Arizona State University Preparatory Academy, located in Phoenix, Arizona, United States.

The ASU Preparatory Academy, Phoenix High School is part of a series of preparatory schools for Arizona State University, including ASU Preparatory Academy, Casa Grande, ASU Preparatory Academy, Polytechnic and ASU Prep Digital.
