= Stratford School (California) =

Private school group in California

Information
- Type: Private School
- Established: 1999
- Grades: Preschool–12th grade
- Accreditation: Western Association of Schools and Colleges
- Locations: Multiple (CA)
- Parent: Spring Education Group
- Website: stratfordschools.com

Stratford School is a group of private schools in the United States. It operates preschools, elementary, middle, and high schools in Northern and Southern California. Since 2017, Stratford has been owned by Spring Education Group, a subsidiary of Primavera Capital Group.

== History ==
Stratford School was founded in 1999 by Sherry Adams, an early childhood educator. The first campus opened in Danville, California, operating out of a church with four classrooms, nine staff members, and 34 students. The school originally offered preschool, Pre-K, and kindergarten, but expanded over time to include additional grades and new campuses.

In 2017, Stratford was purchased by Primavera Capital Group for $550 million and is part of the Spring Education Group, a network of private schools offering programs from preschool through high school in the United States.

== Academics ==
Stratford's curriculum is primarily STEAM-based. Nonprofit education news site The 74 reported that Stratford's math program incorporates project-based learning to demonstrate real-world applications of algebra and geometry. The organization additionally offers a summer camp program that includes academic enrichment, sports, and recreational activities.

== Accreditation ==
Many Stratford Schools are accredited by the Western Accrediting Commission for Schools (WASC).

== Locations ==
Stratford School has opened new facilities throughout Northern and Southern California including a 44,000 square-foot preschool and elementary school in Milpitas in 2022 and the organization's first combined middle and high school in San Jose, CA in the same year. Also in 2022, the organization opened a preschool and elementary school in Dublin, CA.

In fall 2025, Stratford opened a new campus in Milpitas. The school features a STEAM-based curriculum, including multiple Honors and AP courses and a multi-level computer science program.

== Awards and recognition ==
Stratford was the first California school to earn the Carnegie STEM (Science, Technology, Engineering, Mathematics) Digital Seal of Excellence award in 2015.
