= Arizona State University Preparatory Academy =

Public charter university-preparatory school network

Coordinates: 33.45405°N 112.06388°W

Information
- Grades: K-12
- Website: asuprep.asu.edu

Arizona State University Preparatory Academy (also known as ASU Preparatory Academy or ASU Prep) is a public charter university-preparatory school network; it consists of K-12 schools chartered by Arizona State University.

As of August 2021, ASU Prep's network of tuition-free charter schools include about 3,300 students in four metro Phoenix locations, plus ASU Prep Digital, a K–12 online school that reaches out to over 42,000 nationwide and global learners. ASU Prep's campus school locations include:

- ASU Preparatory Academy Casa Grande (Grades 9-12), Casa Grande, Arizona
- ASU Preparatory Academy Phoenix (Grades K-12), Phoenix, Arizona
- ASU Preparatory Academy Polytechnic (Grades K-12), Mesa, Arizona
- ASU Preparatory Academy South Phoenix (Grades K-12), Phoenix, Arizona

== Curriculum ==
ASU Preparatory Academy includes K-12 curriculum as well as college-level extension classes from Arizona State University. The schools are accredited by Cognia, and some of them are STEM-certified.

== History ==
ASU Preparatory Academy was originally founded as University Public Schools, Inc. (UPSI). In 2008 it opened its first campus in Mesa, Arizona. In 2009, the school moved onsite at ASU Polytechnic. The school later became known as ASU Preparatory Academy Polytechnic.

In 2009, ASU Prep opened its downtown Phoenix location in collaboration with the Phoenix Elementary School District.

In 2016, a third location opened in Casa Grande, Arizona, in collaboration with Barça Residency Academy.

In 2017, ASU Prep launched ASU Prep Digital, built on the same college preparatory framework with class offerings all online for part–time or full–time high school students anywhere in the world. In 2020, ASU Prep Digital expanded to also include grades K-8. The digital school's office is with its corporate office in Tempe, Arizona.

In 2018, ASU Prep announced its merger with Phoenix Collegiate Academy, beginning operations of the ASU Preparatory Academy South Phoenix Primary/Intermediate and ASU Preparatory Academy South Phoenix High School campuses.
