= BASIS Independent Silicon Valley =

Location
- 1290 Parkmoor Avenue; Multiple (Sunnyvalle, CA and San Jose, CA); Silicon Valley; San Jose, California 95126; United States; 37.3161403°N 121.912286°W

Information
- School type: Private
- Motto: Educatio Scientia Victoria (Education Knowledge Success)
- Established: 2014
- Status: Open
- Head of school: Sara Kolb (Upper School), Brooklynn Titus (Lower School)
- Grades: Transitional Kindergarten–12th Grade
- Language: American English
- Colours: Red and Black
- Mascot: Bobcats
- Website: siliconvalley.basisindependent.com

BASIS Independent Silicon Valley (BISV) is a private school operated by Spring Education Group in San Jose, California. BISV is a TK-Grade 12 STEM-focused school. The mission of BASIS Independent Schools is to raise the standards of students' learning to the highest international levels.

== History ==
BASIS Independent Silicon Valley was founded in 2014 inside a former IBM office in San Jose. Based on the success of BASIS charter schools opened in Arizona, Texas, and Washington D.C., BASIS.ed decided to implement its educational model into a private school, opening two new private schools in San Jose and Brooklyn.

In the fall of 2022, BASIS Independent Silicon Valley opened a lower school campus in Sunnyvale, California. The lower school serves Transitional Kindergarten (TK) - Grade 5.

Today, Spring Education Group has taken over the ownership and management of the seven private schools.

== Academic profile ==
At BISV, each student takes at least four AP courses before their senior year, where they do independent research and take capstone classes. The school offers a wide range of extracurricular activities including a competitive speech and debate club, volunteering clubs, and active sports teams. Sports include cross country, track and field, volleyball, basketball, and badminton.
