= Basis Scottsdale =

Public charter high school in Maricopa County, Arizona

Location
- 10400 N 128th St; Scottsdale, Arizona 85259; United States
- Coordinates: 33°34′53″N 111°48′21″W

Information
- School type: Public charter high school
- Established: 2003
- Grades: 5-12
- Enrollment: 994 (2022)
- Athletics conference: Canyon Athletic Association
- Mascot: Bulldogs
- USNWR ranking: No. 29 (2022)
- Website: http://www.basisscottsdale.org

Basis Scottsdale is a charter school operated by Basis Schools in Scottsdale, Arizona. The school was founded in 2003 by Michael and Olga Block.

== Academics ==
Charter schools in Arizona are not required to hire teachers who meet state teaching certification requirements. Basis teachers make less than the average for public school teachers in the state, although Basis.ed contends that with bonuses, making teacher compensation competitive. Nevertheless, academic standards at Basis Scottsdale are high. Basis Scottsdale requires graduating students to take seven AP-level courses and sit for six AP exams.

As a publicly funded school, Basis Scottsdale is not selective. In 2017, however, the waitlist numbered a thousand. The school has not traditionally offered a bus service, though in 2020, such a bus service was initiated by school administrators, and used by many students on a daily basis. Asians are well represented, making up almost 63% of the student body. The city of Scottsdale is 4.92% Asian.

== Athletics ==
BASIS Scottsdale competes in the Canyon Athletic Association for high school sports.

BASIS Scottsdale competes in the Great Hearts Middle School League for middle school sports.

BASIS Scottsdale hosts many sports teams including: Varsity Basketball, Varsity Volleyball and Soccer through the CAA.

Some other sports at BASIS Scottsdale include: flag football, golf, tennis, badminton, track and field, cross country, and more.

== Funding ==
Basis Scottsdale is a publicly funded institution. Basis Scottsdale solicits contributions of $1500 per student from parents, an unusual practice for publicly funded schools.

== In the media ==
The school was featured in the documentary Two Million Minutes: The 21st Century Solution.

In both 2014 and 2015, Basis Scottsdale was the No. 2 ranked high school in a U.S. News & World Report list. The school was ranked No. 1 in 2017. In 2018, it was ranked at No. 3. In 2020, the school ranked No. 10 in Charter High Schools, and No. 49 in national rankings. As of 2022, U.S. News & World Report ranks BASIS Scottsdale at No. 5 in Charter Schools and No.29 in national rankings.
