= ASU Preparatory Academy, Casa Grande =

Coordinates: 32.8805°N 111.8447°W

Location
- 2612 West Gila Bend Highway; Casa Grande, Arizona 85193; United States

Information
- School type: Public Charter, High School
- Established: 2016
- School board: Arizona State University Preparatory Academy
- Grades: 9-12
- Language: English
- Website: asuprep.asu.edu/schools/casagrande

ASU Preparatory Academy, Casa Grande is a University-preparatory school in the Arizona State University Preparatory Academy, located in Casa Grande, Arizona, United States.

The ASU Preparatory Academy, Casa Grande High School is part of a series of preparatory schools for Arizona State University, including ASU Preparatory Academy, Phoenix, ASU Preparatory Academy, Polytechnic and ASU Prep Digital.

== Sports ==
In 2017, FC Barcelona announced the opening of the Barça Academy at Casa Grande High School. It is projected to host 100 students.

Former Barça Residency Academy players include Rokas Pukštas, Caden Clark, Julián Araujo, Matthew Hoppe, and Bryce Duke.
