= Sagemont School =

Coordinates: 26.1379°N 80.4242°W

Sagemont Preparatory School
- Weston, Florida; United States

Information
- Type: Private school
- Established: 1996
- Grades: 3 years–12th grade
- Campus: Suburban
- Colors: Black, Red & White
- Mascot: Lions
- Head of School: Mellesia Nelson, M.S.W., M. Ed (Upper Campus)
- Accreditation: Cognia (education)
- Parent: Spring Education Group
- Website: www.sagemont.com

Sagemont Preparatory School (or Sagemont Prep) is a Cognia-accredited private school in Weston, Florida, United States, offering preschool, elementary, middle, and high school education.

== Overview ==
Sagemont Preparatory School operates two campuses in Weston. Sagemont Preparatory Lower Campus serves students ages 3 years through grade 5; Sagemont Preparatory Upper Campus serves grades 6 through 12.

== Lower campus ==
The lower campus is located adjacent to Weston Town Center. The school serves children ages 3 years through Grade 5. The campus features two playgrounds, a red-top basketball court, a swimming pool, an indoor basketball court/gymnasium, and a soccer field. There are three classroom buildings as well as an annex across the street, an art room, a cafeteria, a science lab, a library, and administration offices.

== Upper campus ==
The upper campus is located at the end of Glades Circle in Weston. The school serves grades 6–12. The campus features a weight training room, black box theatre, and an indoor basketball court/gymnasium. There is one two-story classroom building, administration offices, and an arts building behind the school. The two-story building features two science labs and a student-run coffee shop known as Pride Rock Café. In 2023, the school opened its Sebastián Yatra Conservatory of the Arts, named after Grammy winner and former Sagemont alumnus.

== History ==
Sagemont School was founded in 1996 by former educators Renée and Richard Goldman. The school originally served 23 students in preschool through 5th grade. It was one of the first in the nation to establish a laptop program for all students. In 2000, Sagemont opened its Upper School campus serving middle and high school students.

In 2023, Sagemont School rebranded to Sagemont Preparatory School.

== Ownership ==
Sagemont Preparatory School is owned by Spring Education Group and operated by Sagemont Preparatory Corporation.

== Advanced courses & college counseling ==
The school offers college counseling services to support students in the application process and preparation for post-secondary education. High school students have access to honors and Advanced Placement (AP) courses as well as opportunities to participate in academic competitions and honor societies.

== Athletics ==
The athletics program at Sagemont Prep has achieved notable accomplishments in recent years, particularly in basketball and volleyball. In 2023, Sagemont won the Class 2A state championship game, earning its third state title alongside previous wins in 2011 and 2014. In 2025, the boys’ basketball team was ranked #10 in Florida's Power 25 rankings and secured its third consecutive Class 1A FHSAA state championship. In volleyball, Sagemont's girls’ team was ranked #23 in the 2024 Top 25 Florida high school rankings.

== Charitable giving ==
Sagemont Prep participates in various community service initiatives, including food drives, delivering cards for military and first responders, and beach clean up events.

== Notable alumni ==
- Jeff Coby, Haitian-American professional basketball player
- Egor Koulechov (born 1994), Israeli-Russian basketball player for Israeli team Ironi Nahariya
- Fab Melo (1990-2017), Brazilian professional basketball player
- Carlos Pena Jr., actor and singer
- Sebastian Yatra, Colombian singer and songwriter
