= 2 Million Minutes =

2009 documentary film

2 Million Minutes is a series of documentary films exploring how students in the United States, India, and the People's Republic of China spend the nominal 2,000,000 minutes of their high school years. The film has been supported by Newt Gingrich and Al Sharpton.

== Chapters ==
As of 2009, four chapters have been produced.

=== Chapter 1: 2 Million Minutes: A Global Examination ===
Chapter 1 describes the different emphasis students, parents, and teachers put on socialization, academic rigor, and discipline in the three countries. This chapter of the film compares high school students from three countries, India, China and the United States. The film seems to focus on stereotypes of the study habits and social behaviors of students from these different countries. For example, the story looks at American students' natural proclivity to extra-curricular activities like student government and sports teams versus Chinese and Indian students' dedication to additional prepratory work and hobbies like playing instruments.

=== Chapter 2: 2 Million Minutes: In India ===
Chapter 2 describes the Indian K-12 education system. Filmed one year after Chapter 1, it rejoins the two American students and the two Indian students for a discussion. The film also features an interview with the principal of St. Paul's English school, Sundari Rao.

=== Chapter 3: 2 Million Minutes: In China ===
Chapter 3 describes the Chinese K-12 education system. Filmed one year after Chapter 1, it rejoins the two American students and the two Chinese students for a discussion. The film also features an interview with the headmaster of Xiwai International School, Dr. Lin.

=== Chapter 4: 2 Million Minutes: The 21st Century Solution ===
Chapter 4 advocates some solutions for the United States to become competitive in education.
