= Primavera Online School =

School based in Maricopa County, Arizona

Coordinates: 33.3416°N 111.8409°W

- 2501 N. Arizona Avenue, Chandler, AZ

Information
- Type: Charter school, virtual school
- Established: 2001
- Founder: Damian Creamer
- School district: American Virtual Academy
- Director: Jessica Pagoulatos, M.Ed.
- Grades: K-12
- Enrollment: 6,820 (2023-2024)
- Colors: green, white
- Mascot: Panther
- Website: www.primaveraonline.com

Primavera Online School is a publicly funded charter school serving grades K–12 in Arizona. The school was founded in 2001 by Damian Creamer and was made possible by a program established by the Arizona Legislature in 1998. Primavera targets students at risk of not graduating from conventional high schools, estimating that 70% of their students are high risk. In 2018 Primavera was ranked the #2 charter school in Arizona. Primavera added grades K-5 in the 2020/2021 school year.

== Structure ==
Primavera Online School is accredited by Cognia (formerly AdvancED.) There are no fees for students aged 5–22, and only students 22 or younger are accepted. Two types of students attend Primavera: full-time and concurrent-enrolled.

Primavera has open enrollment throughout the year, and offers block scheduling. Students take can take multiple courses in a semester, trimester or credit-recovery block. Each course equals one credit. All teachers are certified and are required to stay in constant contact with each student throughout the course. Primavera claims a student-to-teacher ratio of 33:1.

== Results ==
In 2017–18, there were 21,782 students enrolled in grades six through 12. In 2017's state standardized tests, under a quarter of its students passed mathematics and around a third passed English, both below the state average.

According to the Arizona Department of Education's four-year graduation cohort data, 1,024 Primavera students in the 2024 cohort and 929 students in the 2025 cohort graduated within the state's four-year cohort window.

== Finances ==
Primavera, like other charter schools in Arizona, is publicly funded per pupil, although at a reduced rate due to being online-only.

Primavera opened in 2001 under the management of Primavera Technical Learning Center, a nonprofit charter management organization. In 2015, the school's charter was transferred to for-profit education management organization Flipswitch and its subsidiary, American Virtual Academy, Inc. Flipswitch was renamed Strongmind. It has one shareholder, Damian Creamer, who paid himself an $8.8 million annual salary and made payments to other companies he owns. The school also allocated education funding to a for-profit investment portfolio, worth $36 million in 2015, in lieu of teacher salaries.
