= Metropolitan Arts Institute =

High school in Arizona, United States

Coordinates: 33.466892°N 112.082774°W

The Metropolitan Arts Institute (Metro Arts) is an arts-focused independent charter school, including both a junior high and high school. It is located in Phoenix, Arizona, United States. Metropolitan Arts Institute was established in 1997.

== History ==
Metro Arts provides college preparatory academics and arts courses for students in grades 7-12. Founded in 1997 by Matthew Baker, the school was created as a high school. In 2011 the school added a middle school to the program.

Metro Arts serves grades 7-12, there is one 7th grade class and one 8th grade class with about 25 students for each middle school grade, all other high school grades are filled by capacity.

== Academics ==
The Metro Arts academic curriculum includes humanities, mathematics, science, and foreign language. The curriculum is structured to establish connections across disciplines.

=== Middle school ===
Middle school students take the same academic classes daily including Math, Language Arts, Life Skills, and Science. Middle school students are required to take PE/Health as part of their curriculum, and at the end of the day they take their art course.

=== High school ===
The high school operates on a block schedule, they take different 4 classes daily three times a week for an hour and a half and classes switch daily. High school students can pick more than one art to focus on. All high school students have the opportunity to take honors classes throughout their high school career.

== Arts ==
As the last class of the day middle school students take their arts. High school students take their arts 3 times a week for an hour and a half depending on their schedule, high school students may have an art class first thing or it may be the last class they take.

Metro Arts offers Visual Arts, Theatre, Film, Dance, and Music.

== Campus ==
In Metro's early years the campus originally housed in the old Phoenix Union High School Science building. The building's interior was converted to suit the needs of the school, with the construction of a dedicated dance studio, blackbox theatre, ceramics classroom, and academic classrooms. As the demand increased the school was in search of a new facility. In 2003 the current building at 1700 N Seventh Avenue was purchased and remodeled to meet the needs and specifications of the school.

The Metro building has two floors and covered parking below. The first floor houses all the classes for both arts and academics and the third floor there is a large dance studio, that is shared with the school and the Scorpius Dance Theatre, where some students take Aerial dance.

The interior halls of the schools visual art wing is designed as to look like an art gallery, during the year many showcases are held and student work fills the halls. The exterior of the school is lined with large trees covering the atrium. The performing arts wing is home to the Blackbox, Metro's computer lab, Music Studio, and Metro's Dance Space.

Metro's campus is also shared by many community organizations: the Scorpius Dance Theatre, and the Now and then Creative Company
