= Primavera Capital Group =

Chinese investment firm

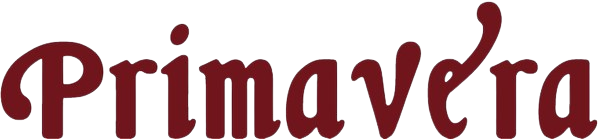
- Native name: 春華資本集團
- Type: Private
- Industry: Investment Management
- Founded: 2010; 16 years ago
- Founders: Fred Hu; Kenneth Wong; William Wong; Haitao Zhai
- Headquarters: The Landmark, Hong Kong
- Products: Private equity Growth equity Venture capital Private credit
- AUM: US$20 billion (November 2022)
- Website: www.primavera-capital.com

Primavera Capital Group (Primavera; Chinese: 春華資本集團; pinyin: Chūnhuá Zīběn Jítuán) is a Chinese investment firm with offices in Hong Kong, Beijing, Silicon Valley and Singapore. It is considered one of China's leading investment firms with notable investments in companies such as Alibaba, Ant Group, ByteDance, XPeng, Yum China and The Princeton Review.

In 2023, Private Equity International, ranked Primavera as the fifth largest private equity firm in Asia based on total fundraising over the most recent five-year period.

== History ==
Fred Hu was previously a partner and the chairman of Greater China at Goldman Sachs. In 2010, Hu and several other managing directors at Goldman Sachs founded Primavera.

The firm primarily invests in China but in recent years has diversified into Southeast Asia and North America.

Institutional investors of the firm include AIA Group, Bank of China, MetLife, Pennsylvania State Employees' Retirement System, State Street Corporation, Varma Mutual Pension Insurance Company and TSMC.

Primavera was an anchor pre-IPO investor of Alibaba. It has also invested in multiple subsidiaries of it including Alipay, Ant Group and Cainiao. In 2017, it purchased Stratford School, a group of private schools operating in northern and southern California.

In January 2021, Primavera held an initial public offering (IPO) of a SPAC, Primavera Capital Acquisition Corporation on the New York Stock Exchange (NYSE) raising $360 Million. In December 2022, Lanvin Group merged with Primavera Capital Acquisition Corporation to become a listed company on the NYSE raising $150 million.

In 2022, Primavera launched its private credit strategy with its debut private credit fund raising $300 million.

In January 2022, Primavera acquired The Princeton Review and its subsidiary Tutor.com from ST Unitas in May 2023.

In September 2023, Florida governor Ron DeSantis announced the termination of voucher program eligibility for four private schools owned by Spring Education Group. The decision was based on national security concerns about the schools' ownership by Primavera Capital Group and its CEO Fred Hu regarding potential connections to the Chinese Communist Party (CCP). Primavera denied that Hu was a CCP member at the time when he was an executive at Goldman Sachs.

== Companies and affiliated entities ==
Company	Location	First investment date	Ownership stake	Ref
Spring Education Group	Campbell, California, United States	1 October 2017	Majority-owned	
Stratford School (California)	Campbell, California, United States	1 October 2017	Owned by Primavera via Spring Education Group	
Tutor.com	New York, United States	January 2022	Owned by Primavera	
