= Tempe Accelerated High School =

Charter high school in Maricopa County, Arizona

Coordinates: 33.379593°N 111.894420°W

Location
- 5040 S. Price Rd. Tempe, Arizona 85282; United States

Information
- School type: Public charter high school
- Principal: Beverly Cook
- Grades: 9-12
- Enrollment: 336 students
- Colors: Burgundy red, gray, black
- Mascot: Titans
- Accreditation: North Central Association

Tempe Accelerated High School was a public charter high school in Tempe, Arizona. It was operated by The Leona Group.
