= Horizon Honors Schools =

Charter school in Arizona, United States

Coordinates: 33.298314°N 111.979006°W

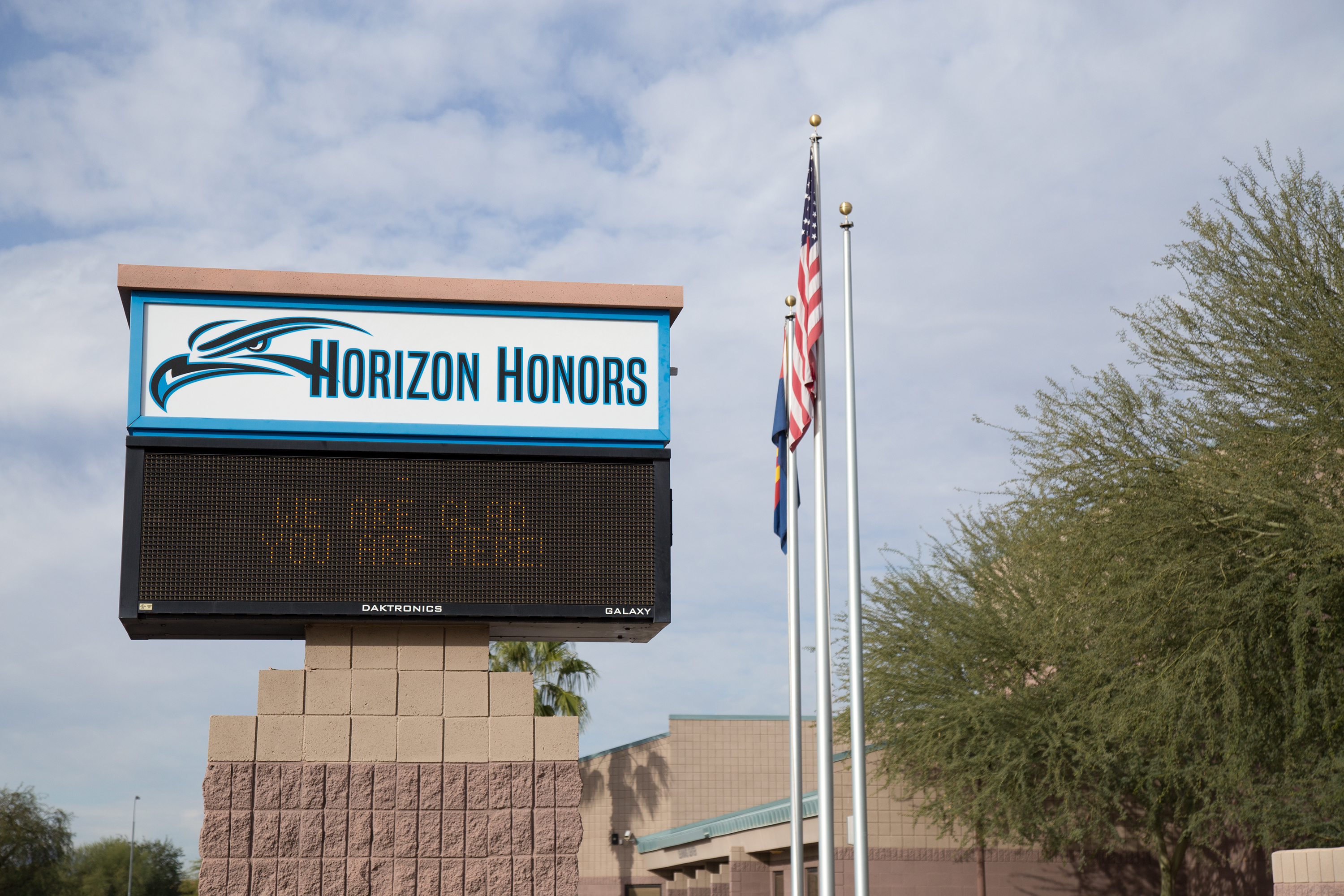
- Marquee at Horizon Honors.

Location
- 16233 South 48th Street; Phoenix, Arizona 85048; United States

Information
- School type: Public charter school
- Motto: Learn. Believe. Dream. Dare.
- Established: 1996
- Superintendent: Paul Schneider
- Principal: Laura Wanstreet & Stacy Dietz
- Grades: K-12
- Enrollment: 1,500 students (total, approx.); 440 in grades 9–12 (2021)
- Colors: Columbia blue, black and silver
- Mascot: Blaze the Eagle
- Team name: Eagles
- Website: horizonhonors.org

Horizon Honors Schools (also known as Horizon Honors or Horizon Community Learning Center) is an organization of tuition-free charter schools in the Ahwatukee Foothills area of Phoenix, Arizona.

Horizon Honors consists of two schools: Horizon Honors Elementary School (Grades K-6) and Horizon Honors Secondary School (Grades 7–12). Over 1,500 students from cities throughout the East Valley attend the schools.

Horizon Honors Elementary School has an enrollment of 728 students. The school principal is Laura Wanstreet. The school is ranked an “A” School by the Arizona Department of Education (2018), designated a “No Place for Hate” School by the Anti-Defamation League, and is designated a “Mix It Up” Model School by the Southern Poverty Law Center.

Horizon Honors Secondary School has an enrollment of 280 students in Horizon Honors Middle School (grades 7–8) and 425 in Horizon Honors High School (grades 9–12). The school principal is Stacy Dietz. The school is ranked an “A” School by the Arizona Department of Education (2018,) has a 99% graduation rate, and 97% of graduates pursue college degrees. The school is ranked a "Best High School" by U.S. News & World Report, and accredited by the North Central Association AdvancEd.

== History ==
It was originally known as Horizon Charter School when it opened in 1996. The current campus was dedicated in 1999; it was built in partnership with Spiral Enterprises, a firm owned by Reggie Fowler whose businesses included a franchise stake in Club Disney.
