= Premier High School =

Coordinates: 33.494936°N 112.222745°W

Location
- 7544 W. Indian School Road Ste. 2A; Phoenix, Arizona 85033; United States

Information
- School type: Public charter high school
- Established: 2002
- Principal: John Scheuer (As of 2023)
- Grades: 9-12
- Enrollment: 173 (2023–2024)
- Colors: Green, white
- Mascot: Tito the Titan
- Accreditation: North Central Association
- Website: https://www.premierhighschool.com/

Premier High School is a public charter high school in Phoenix, Arizona United States.
