= Xiwai International School =

Information
- Established: 2005
- Grades: K–12
- Website: web.archive.org/web/20140602201220/http://www.xw.sjedu.cn/

Xiwai International School is a full-time boarding bilingual school located in Fangsong Street, Songjiang District, Shanghai, People's Republic of China, with kindergarten, primary, junior high, and high school sections. Its name is somewhat misleading as it is, in fact, not an international school but instead a bilingual school. It was established in 2005. The school is jointly operated by Shanghai International Studies University and Shanghai Xiwai Investment Management Company.
