= Apache Trail High School =

Charter high school in Apache Junction, Arizona

Coordinates: 33.4148°N 111.5568°W

Location
- 945 W. Apache Trail; Apache Junction, Arizona 85120; United States

Information
- School type: Public charter high school
- CEEB code: 030002
- Principal: Amanda Correia
- Grades: 9-12
- Enrollment: 215 (2023–2024)
- Mascot: Wolfpack
- Accreditation: AdvancEd
- Website: www.apachetrailhs.com

Apache Trail High School is a public charter high school in Apache Junction, Arizona. It is operated by Leona Group Schools, an operator of 28 charter schools in Arizona. Apache Trails leader Amanda Correia is the leader of the school for all the learning and schooling.

For athletics, it is a member of the Canyon Athletic Association (CAA).
