= Culminating project =

A culminating project (also known as a senior project, grad project or exit project), is a project that challenges high school seniors to demonstrate their academic knowledge in an experiential way (in most cases). According to the United States Department of Education, State Education Boards typically allow individual school districts to customize the project, based on basic state guidelines.

== Confusion about the culminating project ==
People reporting on the culminating project sometimes confuse the terminology with the state high school exit exam. The state exit exam is a written exam that usually tests student's math, reading, writing, and science skills, whereas the culminating project is a required project that is usually a learning experience based on a topic chosen by the student. The project is mandatory in order to graduate.

== Purpose ==
The purpose of the project is to increase both teaching and learning. High school graduation standards have declined for several decades. School reform or the No Child Left Behind Act of 2001 is a way to bring value back to the high school diploma as well as support students as they go out into the world prepared for college, a job, the military, entrepreneurship, internship, or whatever path students decide to follow once they graduate.

== Why a project is required ==
The requirement is an effort to increase education standards. As college admissions and the workplace require more from their recruits, nationwide high schools must also. It is not required by all schools as graduation requirements differ.

A culminating project provides an opportunity for students to explore a topic of personal interest. By completing the project students gain real-life experience which may assist them in their next stages in life (college, job, entrepreneurship, military, internship, etc).

Students gain a number of important skills by participating, such as:

- Leadership
- Communication
- Project management
- Time management
- Group skills
- Negotiation skills
- Meeting deadlines
- Conflict management
- Public speaking
- Presentation skills
- Self motivation

== Kinds of projects ==
The high school graduation culminating project format varies from state to state and even school to school within the same state. Parents and guardians have to check with their students specific school for their requirements. Typically the project consists of choosing a topic of interest, writing a research paper on that topic, having an experience directly related to the topic, keeping a journal of artifacts demonstrating your work, followed by the final step which is a presentation (US Dept of Education).

The student usually presents the project to a panel consisting of 2-5 people typically made up of teachers, community members, faculty, and staff. However, some schools have student present to a panel of their peers. Schools and school districts have total discretion to format the process in a way that works best for their students and their school culture.

In some cases, students complete a project on their own with the support of a mentor from their community. Some schools allow group projects and presentations. For example, it would not be uncommon for the leadership class of a school to raise funds to build a school in Africa. Other requirements include a mandatory social/community aspect related to the project which means the high school graduation project has to benefit someone other than the student.
