= Academy of Tucson =

Location
- Tucson, Arizona; United States; 32°12′21″N 110°45′49″W

Information
- School type: Public charter school
- Motto: Provide, Prepare, Graduate
- Established: 1986 (40 years ago)
- CEEB code: 030466
- Principal: Michael Pavlich (HS); Willie Henry (MS); Kevin Murray (ES)
- Grades: K–12
- Enrollment: 175 (high school, October 1, 2012); 198 (middle school, October 1, 2007); 238 (elementary school, October 1, 2007); 12:1 Student-to-Teacher Ratio
- Colors: Black, white, teal, and silver
- Mascot: Lynx
- Website: www.academyoftucson.com

Academy of Tucson is a public charter school in Tucson, Arizona. In 1986, it was founded as a private high school by Bud and Shari Stewart, originally located in St. John on the Desert Church before opening its own campus on Tanque Verde Loop Road in 1989, and earning accreditation by the North Central Association (now Higher Learning Commission) in 1991. It became a charter school in 1999 and added the elementary and middle schools in 2004. The school has three campuses; elementary, middle, and high school located on the East side of Tucson. Wendi Allardice is the district Superintendent. Academy of Tucson High School is consistently ranked as one of the best public high schools in the city by U.S. News & World Report. Academy of Tucson has an approximately 12:1 student to teacher ratio and a 100% graduation rate.

The Academy of Tucson is currently accredited by Cognia Accreditation.

== Rankings ==
The Academy of Tucson is reported as one of the Niche Best Schools, ranked #3 of 183 for Best Teachers in Arizona, #7 of 151 for Best School Districts in Arizona, and #12 of 195 for Most Diverse School Districts in Arizona.

The Academy of Tucson High School is ranked 48th in Arizona and #2,471 in National Rankings by U.S. News.

The Academy of Tucson High School also has a grade of A according to the Arizona Department of Education Report Cards.

== Elementary School ==
The Academy of Tucson Elementary School serves Kindergarten through 5th Grade. The current principal is Kevin Murray. There are 16 members of faculty, including teachers, principal, and office staff.

== Middle School ==
The Academy of Tucson Middle School serves 6th Grade through 8th Grade. The current principal is Willie Henry. Middle School student activities include National Junior Honor Society, STEM, Wright Flight, Crochet Club, Dungeons and Dragons, Percussion, Book Club, Junior Civitan, Game Board Club, and Drama Club. Sports include volleyball, flag football, softball, soccer, and basketball. There are 17 members of faculty, including teachers, principal, assistant principal, office staff, and superintendent.

== High School ==
The Academy of Tucson High School serves 9th through 12th Grade. The current principle is Michael Pavlich. High School student activities includes sports, such as soccer, basketball, and volleyball, as well as theater. There are 18 members of faculty, including teachers, principal, and office staff.

== School Meals: Community Eligibility Provision (CEP) ==
The Academy of Tucson offers free breakfast and lunch for all students through the Community Eligibility Provision (CEP) of the National School Lunch and School Breakfast Programs.
