= Liberty Baptist School =

Coordinates: 37.3146°N 121.8178°W

Liberty Baptist School, formerly United Baptist, was established in September 1968, in San Jose, California, consisting of ten pupils with Mrs. Cherie Noel as principal and teacher. Liberty Baptist School is accredited by the Western Association of Schools and Colleges and the American Association of Christian Schools.

== History ==
On March 10, 1968, the United Baptist Church voted to purchase classrooms of McKinley School, which had been condemned for a freeway in the amount of $6,300. The building was worth about $150,000 new and was eight years old at the time of the purchase. On June 9, 1968, the church voted to authorize the formation of a Christian Day School beginning with a kindergarten in September 1968.

Cherie Noel was the first principal and teacher of the United Baptist School in 1968. Additional buildings were purchased to make room for more classroom space for the growing church and school ministries. The school grew to over one hundred students in 1969 and began to include kindergarten through sixth grade.

In 1971, Liberty Christian High School was added, and the school became Liberty Christian Schools in 1977. The name was changed to Liberty Baptist School in September 1980. Liberty Baptist School currently operates as a ministry of the Liberty Baptist Church under the leadership of Justin Burkholder as the pastor of the church and Ross Pyle as the principal of the school.

== Music program ==
Liberty Baptist offers musical instruction at the elementary and secondary levels. Students begin learning instruments and receive vocal instruction at an early age. Students also perform in public settings throughout the year and also host various concerts at the school.

School music groups are featured annually in Downtown San Jose, California, at Christmas in the Park, and various other venues. Since Liberty Baptist School is a member of the Golden State Association of Christian Schools and the American Association of Christian Schools, students are able to compete in various fine arts competitions.

== Athletics ==
The mascot of the Liberty Baptist School is the eagle. As of November 2013, the school offers physical education at the elementary and secondary grade levels. Also, students may compete in ladies' volleyball, ladies' and men's basketball, and ladies' softball.

Students compete with other schools in the Pacific School Athletic League
