= Accelerated Learning Laboratory =

Charter school in Tucson, Arizona

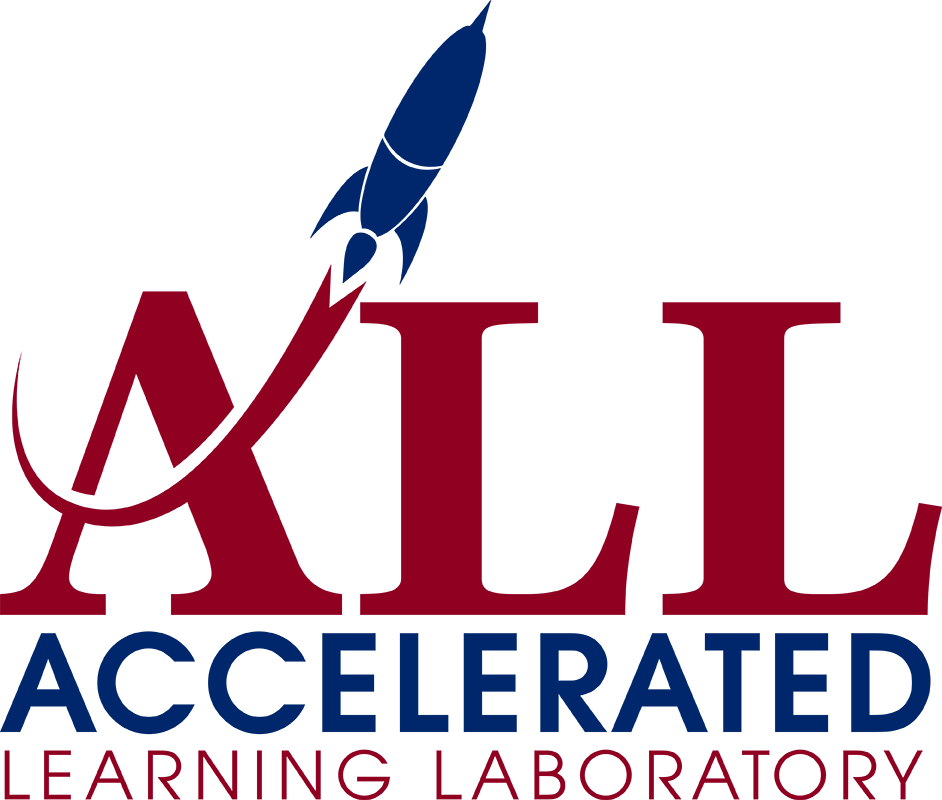

Location
- 5245 North Camino De Oeste, Pima County, AZ 85745; United States
- Coordinates: 32.303153°N 111.065059°W

Information
- Type: Charter school
- Established: 1998
- School district: Accelerated Elementary and Secondary Schools
- CEEB code: 030551
- Principal: David Jones
- Faculty: 19
- Grades: K–12
- Enrollment: 175 (as of 2019-20)
- Campus size: 21.5 acres with buildings occupying 64,000 sq ft
- Campus type: rural–urban fringe
- Colors: Black and red
- Mascot: Lab rat
- Newspaper: The Cheese
- Website: www.allaccelerated.org

Accelerated Learning Laboratory is a free public Charter school (a member campus of Accelerated Elementary and Secondary Schools) in Pima County, Arizona, United States, near Tucson. It provides educational services for elementary, middle, and high school students (Pre-K to 12). The school is located near the base of Wasson Peak in the foothills of the Tucson Mountains.

In 2017, The Washington Post ranked the school the twenty sixth most challenging high school in the United States.
