= Student Choice High School =

Location
- 1833 N. Scottsdale Road; Tempe, Arizona 85281; United States
- 33.460948°N 111.922188°W

Information
- Established: 2000
- Oversight: GAR, LLC
- Principal: Peggy Lynam
- Grades: 9–12
- Enrollment: 1,781 (as of 2023–2024)
- Website: http://www.studentchoicehighschool.com/
- Additional campus location: 222 E Olympic Dr. Phoenix, AZ 85042

Student Choice High School is a Public Charter High School located in Tempe, Arizona. Established in 2000, the school serves at-risk students and prepares them for life after earning a high school diploma.

== History ==
Student Choice High School opened in fall 2000.

The school is accredited by the North Central Association of Colleges and Schools.
