= Kingman Academy of Learning =

Public charter school in Mohave County, Arizona

Coordinates: 35°13′22″N 114°01′43″W

- Kingman, Arizona 86409; United States

Information
- School type: Public charter school
- Motto: "The Road to Success is Learning"
- Established: 1995 (31 years ago)
- CEEB code: 030193
- Grades: K–12
- Enrollment: 1,500 students, total 465, high school
- Colors: Blue, black, silver and white
- Mascot: Tigers
- Website: kaolaz.org

Kingman Academy of Learning (often shortened to Kingman Academy or KAOL) is a public charter school in Kingman, Arizona for preschool grades through high school. It consists of four campuses with a total enrollment of approximately 1,500 students. It is a member of the Arizona Interscholastic Association. The school was founded in 1995 for preschool to 6th grade. It expanded to include high school with its initial 9th grade class in 2001.

The high school's Academic Decathlon program won two years (2010 and 2011) of state titles for the northern Arizona region, which broke the 23-year-running winning streak of St. Johns High School.

The Kingman Academy of Learning was founded by Mrs. Betty Rowe. The executive director is Mrs. Susan Chan. There are four campuses.
