= Saint Andrew's School (California) =

Saint Andrew's Episcopal School
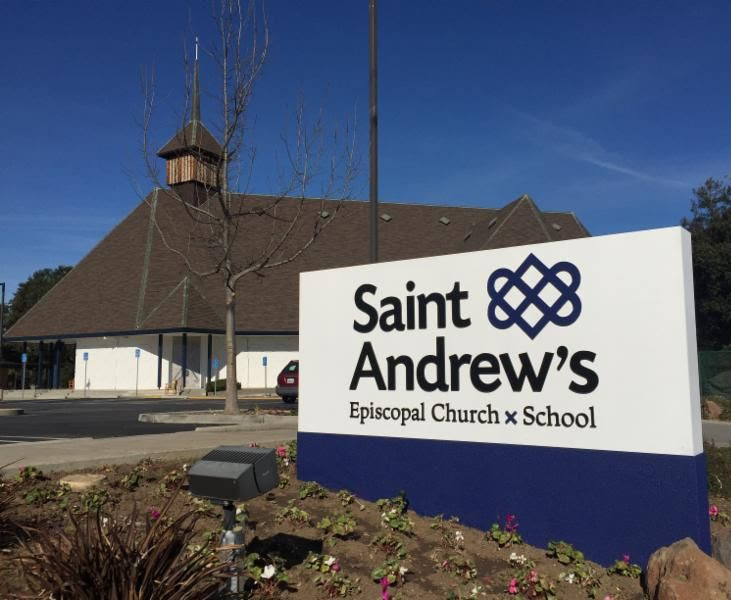

Location
- 13601 Saratoga Avenue; Saratoga, Santa Clara County, California 95070; United States; 37°16′18″N 122°00′57″W

Information
- School type: Private, Independent
- Religious affiliation: Christian
- Denomination: Episcopal
- Patron saint: St. Andrew
- Founded: 1961
- Rector: Maly Hughes
- Head of school: Khadija A. Fredericks
- Grades: Pre-Kindergarten through Eighth Grade
- Age: 4 to 14
- Average class size: 13
- Hours in school day: 7:00 a.m. - 6:00 p.m.
- Color: Navy blue
- Slogan: Wholehearted education in the heart of Silicon Valley
- Sports: B/G Basketball, B/G Volleyball, Track, Cross Country, B Flag Football
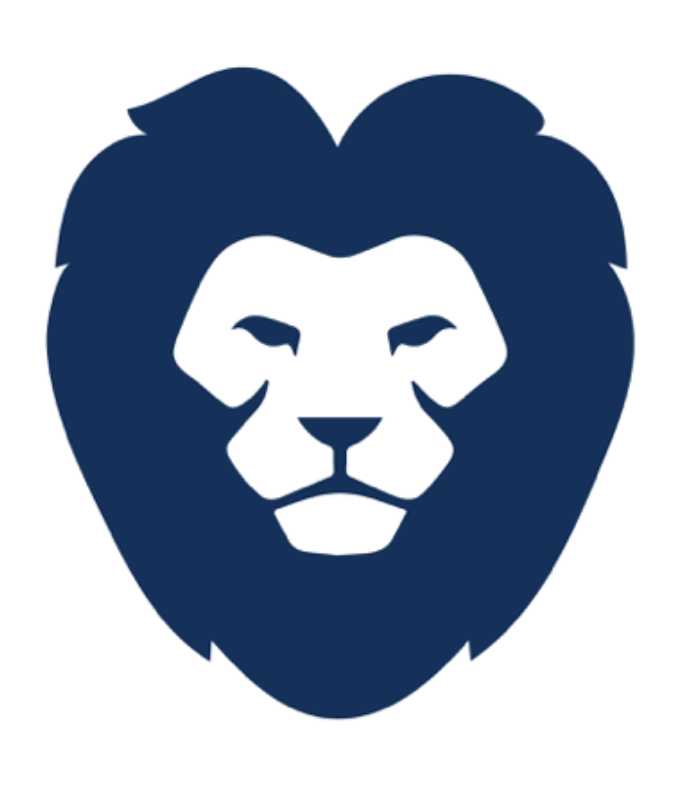
- Mascot: The lion
- Team name: The Pride
- Accreditation: California Association of Independent Schools
- Publication: Saint Andrew's Magazine
- Communities served: Saratoga, Los Gatos, Monte Sereno, Los Altos, Sunnyvale, Cupertino, San Jose, Santa Clara, Mountain View
- Affiliation: National Association of Independent Schools
- Alumni: 1500+
- Website: www.st-andrews.org

Saint Andrew's Episcopal School is an independent co-educational day school, which teaches pre-kindergarten to grade eight in Saratoga, Santa Clara County, California.

Although affiliated with the Episcopal Church, Saint Andrews's welcomes students of all beliefs and includes teaching about all major faiths. It was founded in 1961, as a ministry of Saint Andrew's Episcopal Church, in the Episcopal Diocese of El Camino Real. The school is organized into two divisions: the Lower School (pre-kindergarten–5th grade) and the Middle School (grades 6–8).

The California Association of Independent Schools accredits the school. Saint Andrew's Episcopal School is also a member of the National Association of Episcopal Schools and the National Association of Independent Schools (NAIS).

As of August 2024, 420 students are enrolled, and the average class size is 18. Khadija A. Fredericks is the Head of the School.

== Athletics ==
Saint Andrew's is a member of the Diocese of San Jose Catholic Athletic League - Central Division. The school supports boys and girls Basketball, Volleyball, and flag Football in grades 5-8. Additionally, the school's Physical Education program exposes children to multiple types of sports. In the PE course, each week students in grades 6-8 participate in the unique Race Across the Country Program.
