= Mountain Rose Academy =

Mountain Rose Academy Charter School

Location
- 3686 W. Orange Grove Rd., Tucson, AZ 85741; Tucson, Arizona 85741; United States; 32°19′29″N 111°02′37″W

Information
- School type: Public charter high school
- Established: 1998 (28 years ago)
- CEEB code: 030521
- Principal: Damon Lovato
- Grades: 9–12
- Enrollment: 170 (2023–2024)
- Color: Red
- Website: www.go2rose.com/schools/mountain-rose-academy/

Mountain Rose Academy is a tuition free public high school in Tucson, Arizona, United States. Mountain Rose Academy serves the communities of Northwest Tucson, Marana, and Oro Valley with an enrollment of 245 students.
