= Southern Arizona Community Academy =

High school in Tucson, Arizona

Coordinates: 32°15′06″N 110°56′06″W

Southern Arizona Community Academy (SACA) is a charter high school located in Tucson, Arizona. It opened in the 1999–2000 school year. SACA's enrollment is between 180 and 240 students. Students may earn a high school diploma through an accelerated, career-focused program. SACA was chartered by the Arizona State Charter School Board in May 1999 as a public school. Further, SACA earned approval from the State to expand as an Online High School in 2014. The school's mission is to prepare mature students academically as well as emotionally, with strength and fundamentals to carry with them their entire lives through.

== Educational model ==
Southern Arizona Community Academy is a nontraditional high school. SACA has two library-setting classrooms — the West Classroom, which focuses on languages and social studies, and the East Classroom, which focuses on mathematics, science, and technology. Upon enrollment, students are placed into courses based on individual needs. Courses are self-paced, so students may start or finish a course at any time. Students are always able to receive one-on-one attention from instructors.

== Special courses ==
In May 2006, Southern Arizona Community Academy became the first and only high school Microsoft IT Academy in Arizona. Students can take many classes including: Microsoft Word 2007, Microsoft Excel 2007, Microsoft PowerPoint 2007, Microsoft Outlook 2007, Microsoft Access 2007, and Windows Vista. After a student takes the Microsoft course, students make take the certification exam, which is paid for by the academy. Because SACA is also a Certiport Testing Center, students may become Microsoft certified on campus. Students also have the opportunity to earn college credit while attending SACA. The school pays for students to take classes through Pima Community College.

== Sports programs ==
SACA offers the following sports:

- Flag Football
- Boys' Basketball
- Girls' Basketball
- Soccer
