= Desert Rose Academy =

Public charter high school in Tucson, Arizona

Desert Rose Academy Charter School

Location
- 326 W. Fort Lowell Rd. Tucson, Arizona 85705; United States
- Coordinates: 32°15′56″N 110°58′35″W

Information
- School type: Public charter high school
- Established: 2001 (25 years ago)
- CEEB code: 030516
- Principal: Lisa Corkill
- Grades: 9–12
- Enrollment: 142 (2022-2023)
- Color: Yellow
- Website: www.go2rose.com/schools/desert-rose-academy/

Desert Rose Academy Charter School is a public charter high school in Tucson, Arizona.
