= Compass High School (Tucson, Arizona) =

Public charter high school

Coordinates: 32.2056°N 110.8162°W

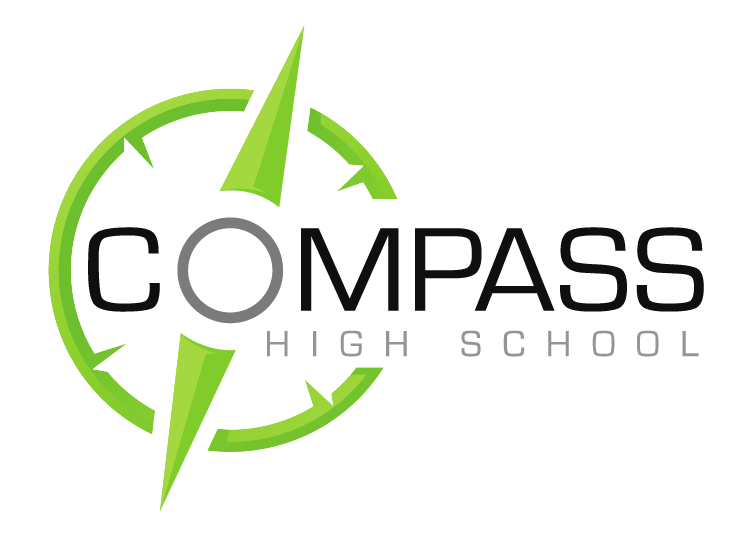

Location
- 8250 East 22nd Street; Tucson, Arizona 85710; United States

Information
- Type: Public charter high school
- Motto: Find Your Direction "That's What's Up!"
- Established: 2001 (25 years ago)
- CEEB code: 030027
- Director: Debbie Ferguson
- Grades: 9-12
- Enrollment: 452 (2023-2024)
- Colors: Chartreuse and Maya blue
- Mascot: Navigators (Alligators)
- Website: www.compasshighschool.com

Compass High School is a public charter high school in Tucson, Arizona, founded in 2001. The school was founded by Debbie and John Ferguson and is currently operated by her children, with her son, Kerk Ferguson as the active Director and Manager of the school's operations.

== Ratings ==
- 34% graduation rate (state average 79%)
- 19% performance in the Arizona's Measurement of Educational Readiness for reading (state average 42%)
- top 75% of all schools nationally
- top 58.82% of Arizona high schools
- top 54.68% of tucson metro area high schools
- top 56.97% of charter high schools
