= FIRST Power Up =

2018 FIRST Robotics Competition game

FIRST POWER UP
- Year: 2018

Season Information
- Number of teams: 3,660
- Number of regionals: 63
- Number of district events: 95
- Championship location: Houston; George R. Brown Convention Center; Minute Maid Park; Detroit; Cobo Center; Ford Field

FIRST Championship Awards
- Chairman's Award winner: Houston; 1311 - "Kell Robotics"; Detroit; 2834 - "Bionic Black Hawks"
- Woodie Flowers Award winner: Gail Drake - Team 1885
- Founder's Award winner: US Air Force
- Champions: Houston; 254 - "The Cheesy Poofs"; 148 - "The Robowranglers"; 2976 - "Spartabots"; 3075 - "Ha-Dream Team"; Detroit; 2767 - "Stryke Force"; 27 - "Team RUSH"; 2708 - "Lake Effect Robotics"; 4027 - "Centre County 4-H Robotics"

Links
- Website: Official website

FIRST Power Up, stylised as FIRST POWER UP, is the FIRST Robotics Competition game for the 2018 season. It involves two alliances of three teams each, with each team controlling a robot and performing specific tasks on a field to score points. The game has a retro 8-bit theme and teams are required to place milk crates, or "power cubes", on large balancing scales to tip the scale and gain ownership. Alliances can also trade power cubes for power ups, giving them a temporary advantage in a match. At the end of the match, robots can climb the tower attached to the centre balancing scale using a rung attached to the tower, giving them additional points.

== Kickoff ==
The kickoff event occurred on Saturday January 6, 2018. The kickoff video featured an 8-bit style animation, outlining FIRST's mission, and an explanation of the game. The event was livestreamed from 10:30am ET, with many teams attending their own local kickoff event to watch the livestream.

== Field ==
FIRST Power Up is played on a 27 ft (823 cm) by 54 ft (1646 cm) field that is covered in grey carpet, called the "Arcade". The field is bounded by transparent polycarbonate guardrails on the longer sides and the Alliance Station walls on the shorter side. While most of the field is alliance-neutral, including where the scoring areas are located, there are some alliance-specific zones, which are the Null Territory, Platform Zone, Power Cube Zone and Exchange Zone on the field, and the Alliance Station and Portals outside the field. All zones belong to the alliance whose Alliance Station is closest to the zone, with the exception of Null Territory and the Portals.

=== Power Cube Zone ===
The Power Cube Zone is an alliance-specific area in front of the Switch that contains 10 power cubes for the alliance that owns the Power Cube Zone to use. Robots of the opposing alliance may not cause Power Cubes that are inside the Power Cube Zone to be removed from the Power Cube Zone. The Power Cube Zone includes the tape used to define the area, but not the Switch that it is adjacent to. The Auto Line runs parallel to the Alliance Station wall, crossing through the centre of the Power Cube Zone, and touching both Guardrails.

=== Platform Zone ===
The Platform Zone is an alliance-specific area between the Switch and Scale that protects robots from opposition interference and gives additional freedoms when attempting end game objectives such as climbing. It includes the tape, Switch and Tower walls used to define the area as well as the rung connected to the Tower. It also contains 6 power cubes that are available for both alliances to use.

=== Null Territory ===
Null Territory is an alliance-specific area next to the alliance's Plate on the Scale that protects robots from opposition interference when attempting to place power cubes on the scale. It includes the tape used to define the area but not the Guardrails.

=== Exchange Zone ===
The Exchange Zone is an alliance-specific area next to the Alliance Station wall that stops opposing robots blocking access to where the alliance's robots can give power cubes to their Human Players through the Exchange. It includes the tape used to define the area but not the Alliance Station wall.

=== Portals ===
Each alliance owns two Portals at the two corners opposite to its Alliance Station. This is where Human Players can give robots additional power cubes through the walls and each contains 7 power cubes. It includes the tape and the wall used to define the area.

=== Alliance Station ===
Each alliance owns an Alliance Station that is at one of the ends of the field. The Alliance Station is where Drivers control their robots at the Driver Stations, Human Players manage power cubes and Coaches give advice to their team members. Technicians, who provide technical assistance and assist with moving the robot, must stay outside of the Alliance Station and the Portals at all times. At the beginning of the match, during the Autonomous Period, all alliance members must stay behind the Starting Line in the Alliance Stations.

==== Exchange ====
The Exchange is a place in the Alliance Station wall where robots can give power cubes to their Alliance Station for either storage in the Alliance Station, storage in the Vault or return to the field. The Exchange Zone surrounds the Exchange, making it a protected area.

==== Vault ====
The Vault is a device at the back of the Alliance Station that Human Players interact with to obtain power ups. Human Players place power cubes, which are collected from the field through the Exchange, inside the Vault to earn Power Ups, with the strength of each Power Up related to how many power cubes are inside the Vault when the power up is played.

=== Scoring Areas ===
There are two Switches, one owned by each alliance, and a Scale, which is neutral, located on the field. An alliance's Switch is located 14 ft (427 cm) in front of the Alliance Station wall and its Plates are 9in (23 cm) above the carpet when level. The Scale is located in the centre of the field and its plates are 5 ft (152 cm) above the carpet when the match begins. The two rungs connected to the Scale's Tower are 7 ft (213 cm) above the carpet, extend 8.25in (21 cm) out from the Tower and are 1 ft 1in (33 cm) across. There are two Plates on each end of the Scales and Switches, one belonging to each alliance. At the beginning of the match, the Plates that each alliance owns are randomised.

==== Ownership ====
Switches and Scales begin the match level, with no alliance having ownership. An alliance gains ownership of a Switch or Scale if, by placing power cubes on their Plate, the respective Switch or Scale is tipped by the weight of the power cubes. An alliance also gains ownership of their Switch if the Force Power Up is played at level 1 or 3, and gains ownership of the Scale if the Force Power Up is played at level 2 or 3.

== Gameplay and Scoring ==
=== Scoring Elements ===
There is only one scoring element in this game, power cubes. Power cubes are 1 ft 1in (33 cm) wide, 1 ft 1in deep and 11in (27 cm) tall milk crates covered in a yellow nylon cover. The FIRST logo covers the open face of the milk crate.

=== Autonomous Period ===
Robots start the match contacting their Alliance Station wall, with no part of the robot inside the Exchange Zone, with up to 1 power cube preloaded onto the robot. The first 15 seconds of the match is the Autonomous Period, where robots act solely on pre-programmed instructions, hence acting autonomously. Drivers and Human Players must stay behind the Starting Line throughout this period. Robots can earn points in a variety of ways. If any part of a robot's bumpers completely cross the Auto Line, they gain 5 points for their alliance. However, they may not pass Null Territory to stop opposing robots completing their Autonomous tasks. If an alliance gains ownership of the Scale or their own Switch, they gain 2 points. For every whole second that an alliance owns the Scale or their Switch in Autonomous, they gain an additional 2 points.

=== Teleop Period ===
After the Autonomous Period ends, the Teleop (Tele-operated) Period begins, which lasts for 135 seconds. Drivers control their robot from their Driver Station and Human Players deliver power cubes through the Portals and place power cubes in the Vault. If an alliance gains ownership of their Switch in Teleop, they gain 1 point, or 2 points if the Boost Power Up is active at level 1 or 3. For every whole second that an alliance owns their Switch in Teleop, they gain an additional 1 point, or 2 points if the Boost Power Up is active at level 1 or 3. If an alliance gains ownership of the Scale in Teleop, they gain 1 point, or 2 points if the Boost Power Up is active at level 2 or 3. For every whole second that an alliance owns the Scale in Teleop, they gain an additional 1 point, or 2 points if the Boost Power Up is active at level 2 or 3. For every power cube an alliance places in their Vault, they gain 5 points.

==== Power Ups ====
During the Teleop Period, teams have access to three Power Ups: Levitate, Force, and Boost. These Power Ups are activated through placing power cubes that are obtained through the Exchange in the Vault. No two Power Ups can be active simultaneously with the exception of Levitate, which both alliances can activate at any point during the Teleop Period. After a Power Up has been activated by an alliance, it cannot be used again. Except for Levitate, all Power Ups last for 10 seconds, and if another Power Up is activated in this time (except for Levitate) it is placed in a queue. The number of power cubes required and effects of the Power Ups are detailed in the table below.

Power Up	Power Cubes Required (Level)	Effect
Levitate	3	Alliance earns a free Climb (only if 2 or less robots have earned a Climb)
Force	1	Alliance gains Ownership of their Switch
Force	2	Alliance gains Ownership of the Scale
Force	3	Alliance gains Ownership of both their Switch and the Scale
Boost	1	Alliance gains double Ownership points from their Switch
Boost	2	Alliance gains double Ownership points from the Scale
Boost	3	Alliance gains double Ownership points from both their Switch and the Scale

==== End Game ====
The last 30 seconds of the Teleop Period is called the End Game. During this time, robots can earn additional points by performing tasks in their Platform Zone. If a robot is fully supported by the Scale, fully outside the opponent's Platform Zone and has its bumpers at least 1 foot above the Platform when time runs out, the robot earns a Climb and 30 points. If a robot has met all of the criteria above but does not have its bumpers at least 1 foot above the Platform when time runs out, the robot earns a Park and 5 points. If the Levitate Power Up has been activated and no more than 2 robots have Climbed, a Climb is credited to a random robot who has not Parked or Climbed. If all robots have at least Parked, one random robot who has not Climbed will be credited with a Climb.

=== Special Scoring ===
In addition to these methods of scoring, alliances can perform special tasks to gain additional points. If an alliance can get all 3 of their robots to complete an Auto-Run and have ownership of their Switch at the end of the Autonomous Period, they have completed the Auto Quest and gain 1 extra Ranking Point in qualification matches. If an alliance has all 3 of their robots credited with a Climb (whether through an actual Climb or the Levitate Power Up), they can Face the Boss and gain 1 extra Ranking Point in qualification matches. If an alliance breaks a rule, they may be penalized. A Foul will result 5 points being credited to the opposing alliance, and a Tech Foul will result in 25 points being credited to the opposing alliance.

=== Scoring Summary ===
Action	Autonomous	Teleop	Ranking Points
Auto-Run	5 points		
Ownership of Scale	2 points + 2 points/second	1 point + 1 point/second 2 points + 2 points/second if Boost level 2 or 3 active	
Ownership of Alliance's Switch	2 points + 2 points/second	1 point + 1 point/second 2 points + 2 points/second if Boost level 1 or 3 active	
Vault		5 points	
Parking		5 points	
Climbing		30 points	
Face the Boss			1 RP (in Qualification)
Auto Quest			1 RP (in Qualification)
Foul	5 points	5 points	
Tech Foul	25 points	25 points	
Win			2 RP (in Qualification)
Tie			1 RP (in Qualification)

== Events ==
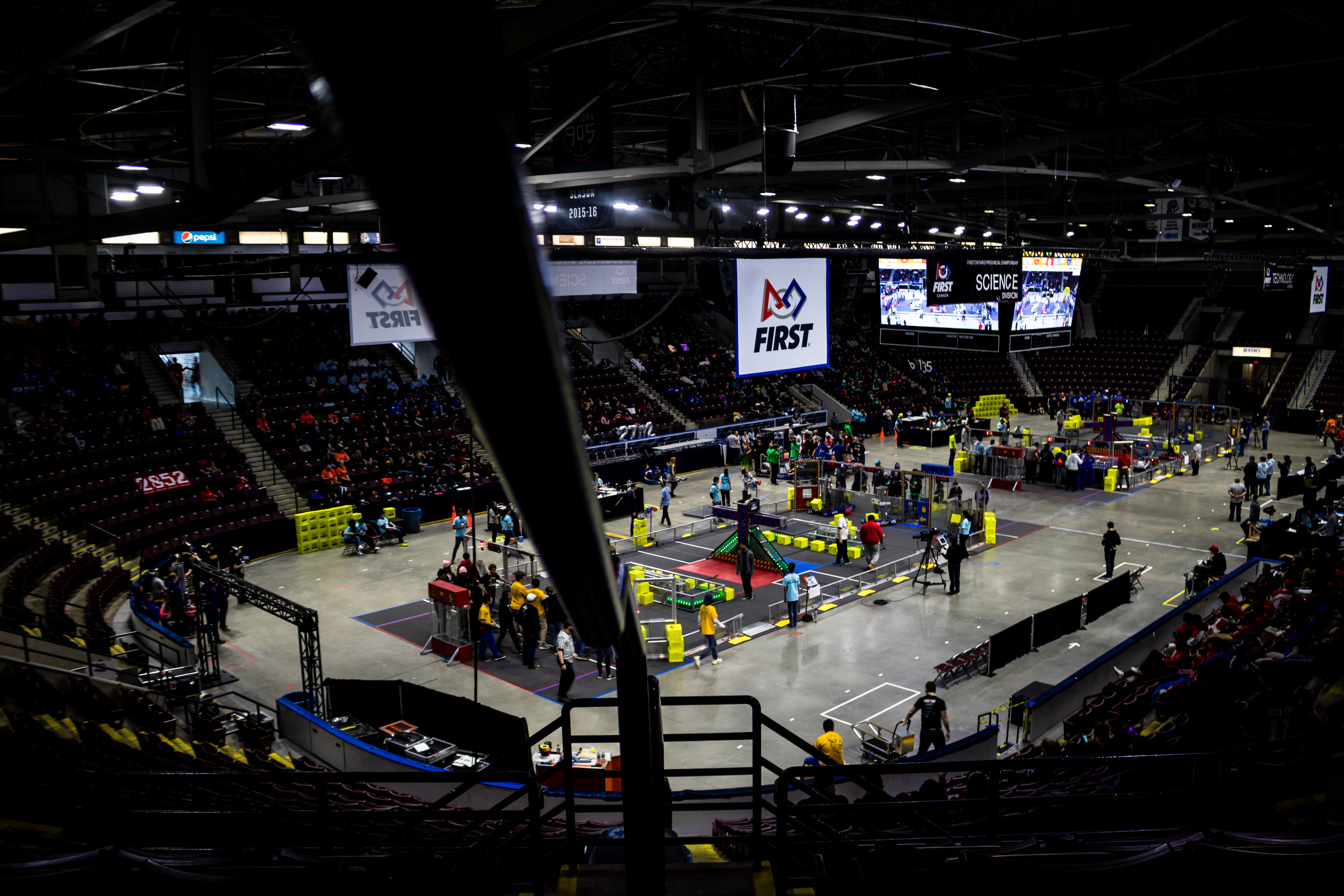
Ontario District Championships

The FIRST Power Up competition season is divided into seven weeks, with many events occurring simultaneously during each week. After Week 7, teams that have qualified compete in the FIRST Championship, held over two weeks in Houston and Detroit. Only regional and district championship events are shown.

=== Week 1 ===
Event	Location	Date
Monterrey	Monterrey, Mexico	February 28 – March 3
Great Northern	Grand Forks, North Dakota	February 28 – March 3
Miami Valley	Fairborn, Ohio	February 28 – March 3
Montreal	Montreal, Québec	February 28 – March 3
Palmetto	Myrtle Beach, South Carolina	February 28 – March 3
Utah	West Valley City, Utah	February 28 – March 3
Central New York	Utica, New York	March 1 – March 4

=== Week 2 ===
Event	Location	Date
Arkansas Rock City	Little Rock, Arkansas	March 7–10
Arizona North	Flagstaff, Arizona	March 7–10
San Diego	Del Mar, California	March 7–10
Orlando	Orlando, Florida	March 7–10
Shenzhen	Shenzhen, China	March 7–10
Lake Superior	Duluth, Minnesota	March 7–10
Northern Lights	Duluth, Minnesota	March 7–10
St. Louis	St. Louis, Missouri	March 7–10
Hub City	Lubbock, Texas	March 7–10
Heartland	Kansas City, Missouri	March 8–11
Istanbul	Istanbul, Turkey	March 9–12
Southern Cross	Sydney Olympic Park, Australia	March 10–13
Canadian Pacific	Victoria, British Columbia	March 13–16

=== Week 3 ===
Event	Location	Date
Rocket City	Huntsville, Alabama	March 14–17
Los Angeles	Pomona, California	March 14–17
Central Illinois	Peoria, Illinois	March 14–17
Greater Kansas City	Kansas City, Missouri	March 14–17
Finger Lakes	Rochester, New York	March 14–17
New York Tech Valley	Troy, New York	March 14–17
Lone Star Central	Houston, Texas	March 14–17
San Francisco	San Francisco, California	March 15–18
Shanghai	Shanghai, China	March 15–18
South Pacific	Sydney Olympic Park, Australia	March 16–18

=== Week 4 ===
Event	Location	Date
Sacramento	Davis, California	March 21–24
Orange County	Irvine, California	March 21–24
Colorado	Denver, Colorado	March 21–24
Hawaii	Honolulu, Hawaii	March 21–24
Iowa	Cedar Falls, Iowa	March 21–24
Bayou	Kenner, Louisiana	March 21–24
Laguna	Torreón, Mexico	March 21–24
Las Vegas	Las Vegas, Nevada	March 21–24
Greater Pittsburgh	California, Pennsylvania	March 21–24
Smoky Mountains	Knoxville, Tennessee	March 21–24
Wisconsin	Milwaukee, Wisconsin	March 21–24
Hudson Valley	Suffern, New York	March 22–25

=== Week 5 ===
Event	Location	Date
Israel District Championship	Tel Aviv, Israel	March 27–29
Chesapeake District Championship	College Park, Maryland	March 28–31
Silicon Valley	San Jose, California	March 28–31
Ventura	Ventura, California	March 28–31
South Florida	West Palm Beach, Florida	March 28–31
Idaho	Boise, Idaho	March 28–31
Medtronic Foundation	Minneapolis, Minnesota	March 28–31
Minnesota North Star	Minneapolis, Minnesota	March 28–31
Buckeye	Cleveland, Ohio	March 28–31
Oklahoma	Oklahoma City, Oklahoma	March 28–31
El Paso	El Paso, Texas	March 28–31

=== Week 6 ===
Event	Location	Date
Mid-Atlantic District Championship	Bethlehem, Pennsylvania	April 4–7
Pacific Northwest District Championship	Portland, Oregon	April 4–7
Canadian Rockies	Calgary, Alberta	April 4–7
Arizona West	Phoenix, Arizona	April 4–7
Aerospace Valley	Lancaster, California	April 4–7
Midwest	Chicago, Illinois	April 4–7
Lone Star South	Pasadena, Texas	April 4–7
Alamo	San Antonio, Texas	April 4–7
Seven Rivers	La Crosse, Wisconsin	April 4–7
North Carolina District Championship	Lillington, North Carolina	April 6–8
Central Valley	Fresno, California	April 5–8
New York City	New York City, New York	April 5–8
SBPLI Long Island #1	Hempstead, New York	April 9–11

=== Week 7 ===
Event	Location	Date
New England District Championship	Boston, Massachusetts	April 11–14
Ontario District Championship	Mississauga, Ontario	April 11–14
Michigan District Championship	University Center, Michigan	April 11–14
SBPLI Long Island #2	Hempstead, New York	April 12–14
Indiana District Championship	Kokomo, Indiana	April 12–14

=== FIRST Championship ===
Event	Location	Date
FIRST Championship (Houston)	Houston, Texas	April 18–21
FIRST Championship (Detroit)	Detroit, Michigan	April 25–28

== Results ==
The following tables show the winners of the subdivisions and finals at each FIRST Championship event.

=== Houston ===
==== Subdivision Winners ====
Division	Captain	1st Pick	2nd Pick	3rd Pick
Carver	4911	2910	4499	5006
Galileo	4488	1574	3965	3374
Hopper	254	148	2976	3075
Newton	1678	1619	4061	1723
Roebling	3476	1323	1072	1778
Turing	1533	1296	2655	3593

==== Einstein ====
===== Round Robin =====
Pos	Division	Pld	W	L	Pts	Qualification
1	Hopper (Q)	5	5	0	2	Advance to Einstein Finals
2	Carver (Q)	5	4	1	1.6	Advance to Einstein Finals
3	Newton	5	3	2	1.2	
4	Roebling	5	2	3	0.8	
5	Galileo	5	1	4	0.4	
6	Turing	5	0	5	0	

(Q) Qualified for the phase indicated

===== Finals =====
Division	Alliance	1	2	Wins
Hopper	254-148-2976-3075	379	392	2
Carver	4911-2910-4499-5006	209	146	0

=== Detroit ===
==== Subdivision Winners ====
Division	Captain	1st Pick	2nd Pick	3rd Pick
Archimedes	868	4003	4541	5422
Carson	217	3357	4967	4130
Curie	3707	195	333	70
Daly	2767	27	2708	4027
Darwin	494	865	4917	51
Tesla	2056	1241	2869	6090

==== Einstein ====
===== Round Robin =====
Pos	Division	Pld	W	L	Pts	Qualification
1	Daly (Q)	5	3	2	1.2	Advance to Einstein Finals
2	Carson (Q)	5	3	2	1.2	Advance to Einstein Finals
3	Tesla	5	3	2	1.2	
4	Curie	5	3	2	1.2	
5	Archimedes	5	2	3	0.8	
6	Darwin	5	1	4	0.4	

(Q) Qualified for the phase indicated

===== Finals =====
Division	Alliance	1	2	Wins
Daly	2767-27-2708-4027	431	469	2
Carson	217-3357-4967-4130	229	322	0
