= Canyon Rose Academy =

High school in Tucson, Arizona, US

Canyon Rose Academy Charter School

Location
- 3686 W. Orange Grove Rd. Tucson, Arizona 85741; United States
- Coordinates: 32°11′36″N 110°51′27″W

Information
- School type: Public charter high school
- Established: 2001 (25 years ago)
- CEEB code: 030519
- Principal: Richard Connet
- Grades: 9–12
- Enrollment: 204 (2023-2024)
- Color: Blue
- Website: www.go2rose.com/schools/canyon-rose-academy/

Canyon Rose Academy is a tuition free public high school in Tucson, Arizona, United States. Canyon Rose serves the communities of central and eastern Tucson.
