= Pima Rose Academy =

Location
- 1690 W Irvington Rd. Tucson, Arizona 85746; United States
- 32°09′41″N 111°00′07″W

Information
- School type: Public charter high school
- Established: 2001 (25 years ago)
- Superintendent: Kelly Hurtado
- CEEB code: 030730
- Principal: Louis Robles
- Grades: 9–12
- Color: Green
- Website: www.go2rose.com/schools/pima-rose-academy/

Pima Rose Academy is a public charter high school in Tucson, Arizona.
