= Spring Education Group =

American private education company

- Established: 2017
- Headquarters: Campbell, CA & West Chester, PA
- Key People: Michael Collins, CEO
- Type: Private School
- Grades: Preschool – High School
- Locations: Multiple (AZ, CA, CO, FL, GA, ID, IL, MD, NV, NJ, NY, NC, OH, OR, PA, SC, TX, VA, WA)
- Parent: Primavera Capital Group
- Website: www.springeducationgroup.com

Spring Education Group (SEG), is an American private education company based in Campbell, California and West Chester, Pennsylvania and is majority-owned by investment funds administered by Primavera Holdings Limited, an investment firm owned by Chinese persons and principally based in Hong Kong with operations in the United States, China and Singapore. It operates a network of over 200 schools across 19 U.S. states, including early childhood education centers, K–12 private schools, and an online school. It includes Stratford School, Chesterbrook Academy, Merryhill School, BASIS Independent Schools, LePort Montessori, and Laurel Springs School.

== History ==
Spring Education Group was formed by combining Stratford School, LePort Montessori Schools, Nobel Learning Communities, and BASIS Independent Schools in 2017 and 2018.

At the time, Nobel had 25,000 students at 190 schools in 19 states and provided education for students 6 weeks through high school. It was founded in 1983 and purchased by Investcorp and Bahrain's Mumtalakat Holding Company (from Leeds Equity Partners) in 2015.

Stratford Schools operated preschool through 8th grade schools in California. Stratford was previously owned by Warburg Pincus, a private equity group. SEG bought it for $500 million in a leveraged buyout using $220 million in loans from Macquarie Group.

In 2018, SEG acquired LePort Montessori, which operated preschool through 8th grade Montessori schools in Southern California.

In 2018, SEG also purchased 200+ schools including Chesterbrook Academy, Merryhill School, Discovery Isle Child Development Center, Enchanted Care Learning Center, Camelback Desert School, Southern Highlands Preparatory School, The Honor Roll School, and other small, regional brands.

In 2019, SEG purchased the BASIS Independent Schools which operate preschool through 12th grade schools. A group of 190 parents from BASIS submitted a letter expressing concerns regarding the schools’ ownership by a China-based private equity firm.

=== Impact of the Covid-19 Pandemic ===
On March 20, 2020, a worker at Touchstone Preschool in Hillsboro, Oregon, operated by SEG, tested positive for COVID-19. The preschool was closed for a deep cleaning and planned to remain closed for 14 days.

After 34 years in operation, a Merryhill preschool permanently closed for economic reasons in May 2020 in Modesto, California. Its financial standing had been made worse due to COVID-19 closures. It had leased space from Tenet Healthcare.

The temporary pandemic closures, which impacted SEG's Debt-to-income ratio, caused Moody's Investors Service to change their credit rating for SEG from "stable" to "negative". In November 2020, SEG's credit rating increased back to "stable."

=== Florida voucher program changes ===
In September 2023, Florida governor Ron DeSantis announced the termination of voucher program eligibility for four private schools owned by Spring Education Group. The decision was based on concerns about the schools' ownership by Primavera Capital Group, a Chinese investment firm, and its CEO Fred Hu. Fred Hu denied any membership in the CCP.

== Finance ==
Spring Education Group is majority-owned by Primavera Capital Group, a Chinese investment firm.

In June 2025, Brookfield Asset Management disclosed a structured debt investment in Spring Education Group.

== Accreditation, awards, and recognition ==
Schools within the Spring Education Group network are accredited by a range of regional and national bodies, including Cognia, Western Association of Schools and Colleges (WASC), the National Association for the Education of Young Children (NAEYC), among others.

In 2025, many Spring-affiliated schools received A and A+ overall ratings from Niche, a school review platform, including BASIS Independent Brooklyn, Merryhill School in Milpitas, California, Stratford School in Palo Alto, California,, Chesterbrook Academy in Cary, North Carolina,, and many others. Additionally, nine students from BASIS Independent Schools were recognized as candidates for the 2025 U.S. Presidential Scholars Program, a national honor awarded based on academic achievement and other criteria established by the U.S. Department of Education.

Several Spring-affiliated schools have also received regional and local recognition, including Xplor Preschool in McKinney, TX earning a Gold ranking from CommunityVotes McKinney 2025.

== See also ==
- Park Maitland School
- Sagemont School
