= ASU Prep Digital =

- Arizona; United States

Information
- School type: University-Preparatory, high school
- Established: 2017
- School board: Arizona State University Preparatory Academy
- Grades: k-12
- Enrollment: 1,500
- Language: English
- Website: asuprepdigital.org

ASU Prep Digital is a public charter university-preparatory school in the Arizona State University Preparatory Academy.

== Academics ==
ASU Prep Digital is an extension of Arizona State University that offers online courses using a college preparatory curriculum. Eligible students can enroll in college courses at Arizona State University. On August 17, 2020, ASU Prep Digital officially opened K-8 grades.

ASU Prep Digital is accredited by Cognia.
