= Dewey-free classification =

Library classification scheme

Dewey-free (also Dewey free, Dewey-less, or word-based) refers to library classification schemes developed as alternatives to Dewey Decimal Classification (DDC). Dewey-free systems are often based on the BISAC subject headings developed by the Book Industry Study Group, and are typically implemented in libraries with smaller collections. Instead of using numerical notation to indicate a document's shelving location, Dewey-free systems organize documents alphabetically by natural language words. Dewey-free systems have been implemented in both public and school libraries.

== Motivations ==
A primary motivation for the development of Dewey-free systems is to eliminate DDC's numerical notation, which many library patrons find intimidating. Abandoning numerical notation in favor of natural language words may also facilitate browsing.

Adoption of classification is often seen as part of a greater trend of using a "bookstore model" to deliver library services. This trend gained traction in 1998 with an article by Los Angeles librarian Steve Coffman. While some librarians see this as a beneficial approach that will make patrons more comfortable and increase circulation statistics, others disagree with the approach, particularly as large bookstores such as Borders have met severe financial challenges.

Many Dewey-free proponents believe that Dewey is outdated and ill-suited for non-academic environments. DDC organizes documents not only by subject, but also by academic discipline. This leads to materials on the same topic being filed in wildly disparate locations. For example, Dewey places books about railroad trains in both the 380s and the 620s. The discipline-based orientation is also problematic for categorizing interdisciplinary works and non-academic titles, which make up the bulk of most public libraries' non-fiction holdings.

DDC has also faced a number of critiques for its biases. Scholars and catalogers have specifically criticized its marginalization of developing countries and continents, Christian-centrism, racism, sexism, homophobia, and marginalization of intersex people. Some proponents of Dewey-free systems suggest that abandoning DDC in favor of new schemes may address these problems, but the literature doesn't include any analysis of BISAC Subject Headings for these issues, nor have any Dewey-free libraries documented strategies for addressing these issues within the taxonomies they have devised.

Librarians who work with children point to additional benefits within their collections. They note that school library workers often have little support and few resources for teaching the DDC system to children. The numbers themselves are often opaque to younger students, who typically don't learn about decimals until late in elementary school.

== Adoption ==
In the 1970s and 1980s, public libraries in the United Kingdom and United States designed new "reader-interest classification" systems as alternatives to DDC. These systems organized materials in ways that are intuitive to non-academic users and employed modern terminology, resulting in collections that are more browsable. However, a lack of standardization led libraries to abandon these systems. Dewey-free classification schemes can be seen as new cases of reader-interest classification schemes.

In 2007, the Maricopa County Library District in Arizona announced that its Perry Library would abandon DDC in favor of a BISAC-based system. The library district reported the change as a success, with non-fiction circulation improving sixfold.

In 2009, the Rangeview Library District in Adams County, Colorado became the first library district to fully convert to a BISAC-based scheme. Rangeview's classification system, which is branded as "WordThink", is based on BISAC headings.

In 2011, the librarians at the Ethical Culture Fieldston School in New York City developed a Dewey-Free system called Metis. The school's novel approach incorporated focus groups of students from Kindergarten through the Fifth Grade in designing the system.

The Darien Library in Connecticut employs a hybrid approach to classification. While books are still organized by DDC number, DDC categories are "clumped into eight broad categories," known as glades. A glade groups together books from several Dewey classes that Darien librarians feel may be useful to similar groups. For example, the Places glade is intended for international travellers, and combines books from the 400s (Languages) and 910s (Travel and Geography).

The Nyack Library in Nyack, New York, used a "marketplace" system similar to Darien's glades. However, after complaints from community members, the library reverted to a traditional DDC collection in 2013.

The King County Library System in Washington announced in 2014 that all 48 of its branches will convert their fiction picture book collections to a Dewey-free subject classification system.

== Evaluation ==
There has been very little formal evaluation of Dewey-free systems, even by libraries that have implemented them.

Many libraries point to an increase in circulation statistics—either for a particular topic or for the non-fiction collection as a whole—as a measure of the success of their Dewey-free systems. However, the correlation between circulation statistics and library classification scheme is not easy to demonstrate. Dewey-free reclassification projects are often undertaken in conjunction with other projects that aim to better merchandise a library's holdings, so it can be very unclear how much of a circulation increase can be attributed to a new classification scheme. Furthermore, library scholars typically warn against using circulation statistics as the sole metric of any project's success, because such statistics fail to account for materials used within the library, materials that were circulated but never read, or materials that were circulated but failed to provide users with the information they needed.

Call numbers are generally not indexed by Integrated Library Systems, so the adoption of word-based classification systems has had little impact on information retrieval quality within library catalogs to date.

== Criticisms ==
Critics of the new systems argue that BISAC's broad categories actually impede browsing, as many different subtopics are interspersed with one another. They prefer DDC's arrangement of materials by specific subject. They also argue that many of the issues addressed by Dewey-free systems could be resolved much more easily with improved signage and book labels.

Even proponents of Dewey-free systems note that BISAC-based classification systems would be unsuitable for libraries with large or specialized collections. Critics have also questioned the pedagogical value of Dewey-free classifications, questioning whether library patrons used to a Dewey-free system will have the skills necessary to navigate collections classified according to DDC or Library of Congress Classification.

Critics have also noted that using English words instead of numbers for all classification sends a message that libraries are only interested in serving English speakers.
