= Rangeview Library District =

Adams County, Colorado

Coordinates: 39°54′52.5″N 104°55′14.8″W

Rangeview Library District is the public library system serving the residents of Adams County, Colorado, through its seven Anythink libraries located in the communities of Bennett, Brighton, Commerce City, Thornton and the Perl Mack neighborhood in Denver. The library district also offers outreach services through its Bookmobile, Anythink in Motion, visiting area neighborhoods and community stops.

== History ==
Originally the Adams County Public Library, Rangeview Library District became independent from Adams County in January 2005 and now operates as its own entity, overseen by a five-member Library Board of Trustees appointed by the Adams County Commissioners. ACPL was founded in 1953, and first served county residents solely out of a Bookmobile. The district has grown exponentially in the past 50+ years to its current seven branches, with four new branch buildings designed by Humphries Poli Architects (Denver) as part of its capital construction project.

== Anythink ==
In September 2009, Rangeview Library District launched its new brand, Anythink. The district changed the names of its community libraries to Anythink libraries as part of the district's branding efforts. The district's new logo includes a "doodle," meant to represent the beginning of all ideas, above the "Anythink" name. The tag line reads "A Revolution of Rangeview Libraries."

Library staff job titles and descriptions changed in July 2009. There are three different job titles in the branch: "Wrangler," "Concierge" or "Guide." Branch managers are now called "Experience Experts." All staff and customers are referred to as "Anythinkers."

As part of the brand launch, Anythink creative consultants partnered with Canadian animator Jeff Chiba Stearns to create a short animation where the doodle takes on a life of its own. The animation signifies the many things a doodle can become and the sparks of imagination available to anyone who visits an Anythink library.

== Sustainable practices ==
The Rangeview Library District Board of Trustees decided early on that the new libraries built as part of their 2008-2010 capital construction projects would be as sustainable as possible. It was agreed that they would pursue U.S. Green Building Council’s LEED silver certification on three of the four new facilities. The district's long-term goal is to make all of its libraries carbon-neutral facilities.

Anythink Bennett, which opened in May 2009, will not be certified. However, the building is highly efficient and sustainable by using local materials like beetle-killed pine for the ceiling and front entrance, Solatubes for natural light, ground-source heating and cooling and recycled materials through most of the facility. A $75,000 grant from the Colorado Department of Local Affairs allowed the district to include a 10 kW photovoltaic system on the library's roof.

Anythink Brighton, which opened in September 2009, is the most sustainable of the four new buildings in the capital construction project thus far and is considered the first carbon-negative library in the U.S. The facility will operate without emitting pollutants because of renewable energy and carbon credits, including a 108 kW photovoltaic system on the building's roof that was purchased through a $300,000 matching grant from DOLA. Additionally, the project will offset the emission of an additional 167,620 lbs of CO_{2} created by other buildings within the Brighton community by producing more renewable energy than it will use. The building is LEED gold certified.

== WordThink ==
WordThink is a word-based classification system developed by Rangeview Library District's collection development department to replace Dewey Decimal Classification. Patterned after BISAC Subject Heading and the word-based system used by Maricopa County Library District, WordThink organizes materials according to 45 different categories with additional subcategories. Materials are then arranged alphabetically by title.

The designations in the WordThink system use words instead of numbers. The spine labels include up to four levels with eight characters per line, beginning with the top-level category. The Bennett and Perl Mack branch libraries were the first in the district to adopt WordThink. By the end of 2009 all Anythink libraries used the new word-based system.

== Recognition ==
Rangeview Library District and its Anythink libraries were the recipients of a 2010 National Medal for Museum and Library Service. The annual award, made by the Institute of Museum and Library Services (IMLS) since 1994, recognizes institutions for outstanding social, educational, environmental, or economic contributions to their communities. U.S. Representative Jared Polis (CO-2) nominated the district for the award.

Pam Sandlian Smith was named 2010 Colorado Librarian of the Year by the Colorado Association of Libraries for her work at Rangeview Library District.

Anythink was named one of five recipients of the 2011 John Cotton Dana Award for its 2009-2010 brand launch. The award is presented by the American Library Association for outstanding public relations in libraries.

In 2012, Anythink Director Pam Sandlian Smith was the recipient of the Charlie Robinson Award "for her transformative vision and leadership in reinventing the Rangeview Library District." Administered annually by the Public Library Association, the Charlie Robinson Award honors a public library director who, over a period of seven years, has been a risk taker, an innovator and/or a change agent in a public library.

In 2012, Anythink Family Services Director Lynda Freas was awarded the 2012 Sullivan Award. The American Library Association presents the Sullivan Award annual to an individual "who has shown exceptional understanding and support of public library service to children."

In 2013, Anythink Communications Director Stacie Ledden received the national "Mover & Shaker" award from Library Journal for her effective and out-of-the-box approach to library marketing and outreach, highlighted by her role in Anythink communications and the inaugural 2012 R-Squared Conference.

In 2013, Anythink Director Pam Sandlian Smith was selected as a member of The Aspen Institute Dialogue on Public Libraries, a newly created initiative to explore, develop and champion news ways of thinking about U.S. public libraries. Composed of leaders from the library, business and government industries, as well as visionaries and experts from education and community development, the Dialogue gathered for an invitation-only meeting in August 2013 in Aspen, Colo.

In 2014, Anythink was awarded a $32,000 grant by Adams County Open Space to help build Explore Outdoors at Anythink Commerce City, an outdoor classroom designed to help children make connections with the natural world.

In 2015, Anythink Brighton received the Reaching In Award from School District 27J for innovative programming, partnerships and interactive spaces that positively impacted the students and staff of a school system that serves more than 165,000 students in Brighton, Commerce City, Thornton and Aurora, Colo.

In 2015, Anythink staff member Hannah Martinez won the Lucy Schweers Award for Excellence in Paralibrarianship, issued by the Colorado Association of Libraries. Martinez was nominated for this award for her work in spearheading Anythink's AnyAbility program, designed for adults with disabilities.

In 2016, Anythink director Pam Sandlian Smith was elected to serve as the 2017-2018 President of the Public Library Association (PLA). PLA is the largest association dedicated to supporting the unique and evolving needs of public library professionals.

In 2017 and 2018, Anythink's magazine, SPARK, earned awards from the Colorado Society of Professional Journalists Top of the Rockies contest. The annual judged contest highlights excellence in journalism for reporters, designers and publications in Colorado, New Mexico, Utah and Wyoming.

== Funding ==
Rangeview Library District's current and future growth is due to the support of the Adams County community, who in November 2006 voted to approve a mill levy to help fund the library. Since then, through the leadership of library director Pam Sandlian Smith, the library system has shifted course and positioned itself so Anythink libraries are not only valuable resources but community gathering places.

== Experience zones ==
All Anythink locations set up unique “experience zones” throughout the year. Experience zones are areas created by Anythink staff that allow for interactive experiences in the library. These zones use a hands-on approach to make information and learning more interactive within the library setting. Previous experience zones have included embryology programs where customers can watch baby chicks and ducklings hatch live at the library, office supply fashion design contests and the transformation a conference room into a happiness-themed retreat.

== mySummer ==
Anythink's annual summer reading and experience program consists of a series of interactive programs, events and entertainment for all ages. Participants are encouraged to become mySummer members and sign up for individual programs throughout the summer months. The mySummer slogan is READ THINK DO.

Anythink uses the concept of traveling kits to provide the entire district with developed mySummer programs. Previous kits have ranged in scope from paleontology to shadow puppetry to local songbirds to forensics, and partners have included organizations like the Denver Museum of Nature and Science, the Arvada Center for the Arts and Humanities, and the Raptor Education Foundation. As a result of these innovative programs, mySummer participation has more than tripled – from 3,700 in 2010 to 10,918 in 2013 – over the course of three years.

In 2012, Anythink offered 275 mySummer programs.

A 2013 survey of mySummer participants found that 61.9 of participants found the programming quality to be either exceptional or exceeding expectations.

In 2018, Anythink partnered with Colorado Parks and Wildlife, a collaboration that encouraged an emphasis on the state and its natural resources. The 2018 mySummer series included programs on backyard bugs, birds of prey, archery and campsite sing-a-longs. Participants were invited to continue their learning in nature, as their participation included a Colorado Parks and Wildlife gift certificate that could be applied toward entrance at any of Colorado's 41 state parks, a fishing license or campsite reservation. Because of a generous donation from Eagle Claw, Anythink also began circulating fishing poles during mySummer 2018. More than 12,900 people signed up to participate in the mySummer 2018 program.

== The Studio ==
The Studio is Anythink's overall approach to hands-on, participatory programming. In addition to the philosophy of The Studio, Anythink also has two physical creation labs for customers – The Studio at Anythink Wright Farms, a digital learning lab, and The Studio at Anythink Brighton, the district's first makerspace. The Studio emphasizes community partnerships and mentorships with its Artists in Residence program, which employs creative community members to share their skills with Anythink customers. The Studio at Anythink Wright Farms uses the Hanging Out, Messing Around and Geeking Out (HoMaGo) to encourage students to explore and create using digital technology.

== Explore Outdoors ==
Anythink launched its first outdoor classroom, Explore Outdoors, at Anythink Wright Farms in September 2012. At Explore Outdoors, students are encouraged to explore their creativity through activities like climbing, building and performing. The classroom contains natural materials designed to spark curiosity and create a lifelong love of nature. It was certified as an official Nature Explore classroom in March 2013, making it part of a network of recognized schools and organizations committed to reconnecting children with nature.

== Anythink Grows ==
As part of the Anythink Grows, several Anythink locations have public community gardens, including Anythink Commerce City, Anythink Perl Mack and Anythink Wright Farms. The Anythink Grows is an initiative in partnership with Denver Urban Gardens to promote healthy living. Participating community members are encouraged to harvest vegetables, herbs and fruits, while also contributing to planning meetings, workshops and community days.

== Anythink Libraries ==
- Anythink Bennett
- Anythink Brighton
- Anythink Commerce City
- Anythink Huron Street
- Anythink Nature Library
- Anythink Perl Mack
- Anythink Thornton Community Center
- Anythink Wright Farms

== Anythink York Street ==
On June 1, 2013, Anythink opened Anythink York Street, located on the Mapleton Public School District's Skyview Campus in Thornton, Colorado. Anythink York Street is part of a mixed-use partnership between Anythink and Mapleton Public Schools. Though located on a school campus that houses five difference educational facilities for students of a wide variety of ages, Anythink York Street operates as a public library for the entire Thornton community. Anythink is the lessee of the 9,388 square-foot library space on the Skyview Campus and maintains their own standard policies and procedures.

== Outreach Services ==
In November 2008, Rangeview Library District unveiled its new bookmobile, which incorporates energy-efficient designs to reduce environmental impacts and noise. Since the launch of the brand, the bookmobile is now called Anythink in Motion. The lights and electric outlets are battery-powered by an inverter, which is charged while Anythink in Motion is driven and when plugged in at night. A Webasto heating system uses copper pipes under the floor that carry hot water, heating the bookmobile from the floor up. Sky lights provide natural light in the vessel, and Anythink in Motion gets twice as many miles per gallon as the old one. The Cummins Onan Quiet Diesel generator is used to cool the vehicle in the summertime, and its unique design reduces noise pollution and fumes.

Anythink in Motion currently visits area neighborhoods and community gathering places. It also visits several Adams County schools who have limited access to Anythink libraries.

== Anythink Foundation ==
The Anythink Foundation was created in 2009 to raise financial support for Anythink from the private sector. The foundation is a non-profit corporation organized solely for community and educational purposes within the meaning of section 501(c)(3) of the Internal Revenue Code.

The foundation's mission and purposes are:

1. To generate broad-based public support and participation in order to forward and support RLD's mission to "open doors for curious minds" by enhancing the public's understanding and enjoyment of the library through the use of special programs, activities and projects.

2. To work with RLD to raise money through contributions so that capital projects, programs and activities may continue to be provided for the general public.

The Foundation works with RLD's board of trustees and library director to identify needs for funding of special programs, activities and capital projects that cannot be funded with public-sector dollars. Funds raised by the Anythink Foundation support programs and services in four key areas: capital projects, public art, expansion of collections, exceptional programs, activities and computer education.
