= Steve Belles =

American football player (born 1966)

No. 7
- Position: Quarterback

Personal information
- Born: November 21, 1966 (age 59); Phoenix, Arizona, U.S.
- Listed height: 6 ft 3 in (1.91 m)
- Listed weight: 210 lb (95 kg)

Career information
- High school: Phoenix (AZ) St. Mary's
- College: Notre Dame

Career history
- Arizona Rattlers (1992)

Awards and highlights
- National champion (1988)

Career AFL statistics
- Comp. / Att.: 24 / 60
- Passing yards: 212
- TD–INT: 6–5
- Passer rating: 40.42
- Rushing TDs: 3
- Stats at ArenaFan.com

Steve Belles (born November 21, 1966) is an American former professional football quarterback who played for the Arizona Rattlers of the Arena Football League (AFL). He subsequently became a high school football coach in Arizona, amassing five state championships at Hamilton High School in Chandler. He played college football at Notre Dame.

== Playing career ==
Belles attended St. Mary's High School in Phoenix, where in 1984 he won a state championship and was named Arizona High School Player of the Year. He played college football at the University of Notre Dame.

After college he played one season with the Arizona Rattlers of the Arena Football League. He was also offensive coordinator of the Rattlers in 1993 and played in Europe for the Ravenna Chiefs in 1991.

== Coaching career ==
Belles has been a head coach at three Arizona high schools: Desert Mountain High School in Scottsdale, Mountain Ridge High School in Glendale, and most recently Hamilton High School in Chandler. He was at Desert Mountain from 1995 to 2000 with a 26-25 record. At Mountain Ridge, where he was head coach from 2000 to 2006 with a 47-13 record, his team advanced to the state finals in 2004 against his future team, Hamilton High School, losing 37–7.

Belles became the head football coach at Hamilton in 2006 after John Wrenn left to become Arizona State University's running backs coach. He was instantly successful there with a 13–1 record, Fiesta Region Title, and an Arizona State Championship in his first season. Belles amassed a 131–18 record as coach, including five State Championships at Hamilton, and Arizona's big school state record 53-game win streak. During his tenure, Hamilton was ranked as high as fourth in the nation by the USA Today Super 25. As a head coach, Belles has a 204–56 record.

As a result of a hazing scandal at Hamilton becoming public in 2017, Chandler Unified School District suspended Belles as coach before the start of the football season. He remained at the school as a teacher until September, when he was reassigned to the district offices, and in December the head coach position was advertised with the Arizona Interscholastic Association.

On June 25, 2018, Belles announced he would become an assistant coach at Juan Diego Catholic High School in Draper, Utah responsible for the quarterbacks and defensive back positions.
