= Perry High School (Gilbert, Arizona) =

High school in Gilbert, Arizona

Coordinates: 33.2617°N 111.7485°W

- Home of the Pumas
- 1919 E. Queen Creek Road; Gilbert, AZ

Information
- Type: Public
- Motto: Pride, Progress, Purpose
- Established: 2007
- Status: Open
- Locale: City, Large (11)
- School district: Chandler Unified School District
- NCES District ID: 0401870
- CEEB code: 030668
- NCES School ID: 040187002806
- Principal: Heather Patterson
- Faculty: 118.65
- Teaching staff: 132.45 (FTE)
- Grades: 9-12
- Enrollment: 2,601 (2023-2024)
  - Grade 9: 555
  - Grade 10: 613
  - Grade 11: 569
  - Grade 12: 636
- Student to teacher ratio: 19.64
- Colors: Navy and cardinal red
- Athletics conference: 6A
- Mascot: Pumas
- Newspaper: The Precedent
- Website: https://phs.cusd80.com

Perry High School is a public high school located in Gilbert, Arizona.

== History ==
Perry was the 4th high school built by Chandler Unified School District (CUSD) opening its doors in 2007.

== Academics ==
Perry's curriculum is aligned with the standards set by the Arizona Department of Education and implements the state's Education and Career Action Plan (ECAP) required for all students grades 9–12 graduating from a publicly funded high school. CUSD high schools also implements an open enrollment policy, meaning students from outside the intended school boundaries may attend without tuition or other penalties.

Arizona requires that all high school students take 6 credit bearing courses during their freshmen through junior years, and provides the option for students on track for graduation the ability to reduce their course load to 4 credit bearing courses. However, CUSD requires all students must complete 22 credits whereas the public university system controlled by the Arizona Board of Regents requires only 16 credits in the following areas:

- English - 4 credits
- Mathematics - 4 credits
- Science - 3 credits
- Social Studies. - 3 credits
- Career and Technical Educator/Fine Arts - 1 credit
- Physical Education - 1 credit
- Comprehensive Health - 1/2 credits
- Elective Courses - 5 1/2 credits

=== Cross-credit courses ===
At Perry and all CUSD high school students may swap two semesters (1/2 credits per semester) of Spiritline, Beginning through Advance Dance, Drill Team, Color Guard, Marching Band, Winter guard, or AFJROTC essentially waiving the required one Physical Education credit required for graduation.

Students which choose applied sciences in areas such as Applied Biology or Applied Agricultural Sciences gain equivalent Science credits. Likewise, Economics credits can be awarded like Agricultural Business Management, Business, Business Applications, Marketing, Economics Applications, Family and Consumer Sciences, and vocational courses.

Community college credits can be awarded through a partnership with Chandler-Gilbert Community College (CGCC) and cooperative credits for vocational courses are provided by East Valley Institute of Technology (EVIT). Students must be dually enrolled for the Arizona community college or the Arizona public university system to accept the credits towards a degree. CUSD Transportation Department provides routes between Perry, EVIT, and CGCC with after school hours transportation intended for students participating in activities.

Separate from EVIT and CGCC, the University of Arizona implemented a pilot program to get university credits for students pursuing introductory engineering courses starting in 2014.

== Extracurricular activities ==
=== Athletics ===
Perry is an Arizona Interscholastic Association (AIA) member school offering boys and girls sports adhering to Chandler Unified School District (CUSD) Title IX compliance. Student athletes can participate in varsity, junior varsity, and freshmen only teams as well as individual sports under the AIA's 6A Conference. Perry Athletics consist of these sports:

- Badminton (Girls)‡
- Baseball
- Basketball (Boys and Girls)
- Beach Volleyball (Boys and Girls)‡
- Cheer (Girls and Coed)
- Cross Country (Boys and Girls)†
- Flag football
- Football
- Golf (Boys and Girls)†
- Hockey
- Lacrosse (Boys and Girls)
- Pomline
- Soccer (Boys and Girls)
- Softball
- Swim and Dive (Boys and Girls)†
- Tennis (Boys and Girls)‡
- Track and field (Boys and Girls)†
- Volleyball (Boys and Girls)‡
- Wrestling (Boys and Girls)
- † denotes individual and team sports
- ‡ denotes individual, doubles, and team sports

Each sport is funded by the school, yet additional funds are raised through boosters creating 501(c)(3) non-profit organization, donations, and tax credits.

== Other extracurricular activities ==
While Perry Athletics is a completely voluntary, the Marching Band and Robotics programs can garner academic credits if the student opts into taking them as elective credits.

=== Fine Arts Department ===
In the fall of 2014, the Perry High School department was invited to perform their production of The Addams Family at the Arizona Thespians State Conference, where they were also awarded for other achievements. In 2015, their production of The 25th Annual Putnam County Spelling Bee was chosen as Arizona's chapter select at the International Thespian Festival. In 2017, their spring production of Mary Poppins was also awarded Best Overall Production at the ASU Gammage High School Musical Theatre Awards. Additionally, they were named AIA state champions of the Central Region for 7 consecutive years 2002-19, when the Arizona Thespian Society discontinued its competitive ranking system.

=== Marching Band ===
Perry’s marching band has repeatedly earned high scores at competitions around the state.

=== Orchestra ===
The Orchestra who played there in 2015, earning first place at the event.

=== Choir ===
Perry High also has a choir who in 2011 sang at Carnegie Hall in New York City.

== Campus ==
The school's design was based on the layout of Basha High School, another school in the Chandler Unified School District, with an additional "F" building built exclusively for Career and Technical Education (CTE) classes in the same place as the "H" building in Basha High School. In 2019, an additional "C" building was constructed on the east side of the campus for English and World Languages classes.

=== Library ===
When Hamilton High School and Basha High School were built, the city of Chandler incorporated branch libraries into those sites. Perry is within Gilbert town limits, and so the Chandler Unified School District worked to incorporate a Maricopa County Library District branch into the site. The Perry Branch Library opened in June 2007. It was the first public library located in a high school in Gilbert, and the first public library in the nation to not use the Dewey Decimal System, opting instead for a bookstore-like system that places non-fiction books into categories based on subject. This change brought national attention to the library and provoked debate about the effectiveness of the Dewey Decimal System.

The county library is the second to be integrated inside a high school, after the library at Boulder Creek High School in Anthem, which also features a Maricopa County regional library

== Notable alumni ==
- Madison Conner - Class of 2021 - college basketball player
- Trevor Hauver - Class of 2017 - baseball player in the Texas Rangers organization
- Jordan Howard - Class of 2014 - professional basketball player
- Markus Howard - Class of 2017 - transferred), NBA player
- Koa Peat - Class of 2025 - five-star recruit basketball player
- Brock Purdy - Class of 2018 - NFL Pro Bowl quarterback for the San Francisco 49ers
- Chubba Purdy - Class of 2020 - Nevada Wolf Pack quarterback
- James Rallison - Class of 2014 - YouTuber with 20 million subscribers
- Victoria Vredevoogd - Class of 2019 - Miss Arizona
- Cody Williams - Class of 2023 - basketball player for the Utah Jazz
- Jalen Williams - Class of 2019 - NBA All Star forward for the Oklahoma City Thunder
- Cristian Zendejas - Class of 2017 - former Arizona State Sun Devils kicker
