= Arizona College Preparatory =

- Home of the Knights

Location
- 1150 W. Erie Street (ACPMS); 4477 S. Gilbert Road (ACPHS); Chandler, Arizona 85224; United States; 33°18′37″N 111°51′42″W

Information
- School type: Junior High and High School
- Motto: Strive for the impossible and be extraordinary
- Established: 2007
- School district: Chandler Unified School District
- Principal: Robert Bickes
- Grades: 6 to 12
- Enrollment: 751 students (ACPMS; 2020); 815 students (ACPHS; 2020)
- Colors: Purple, black, white, gray
- Mascot: Noble the Knight(ACPMS); Sir Thunder the Knight (ACPHS),
- Website: High school Middle school

Arizona College Prep (ACP) is a junior high and high school in the Chandler Unified School District in Chandler, Arizona, USA.

== History ==
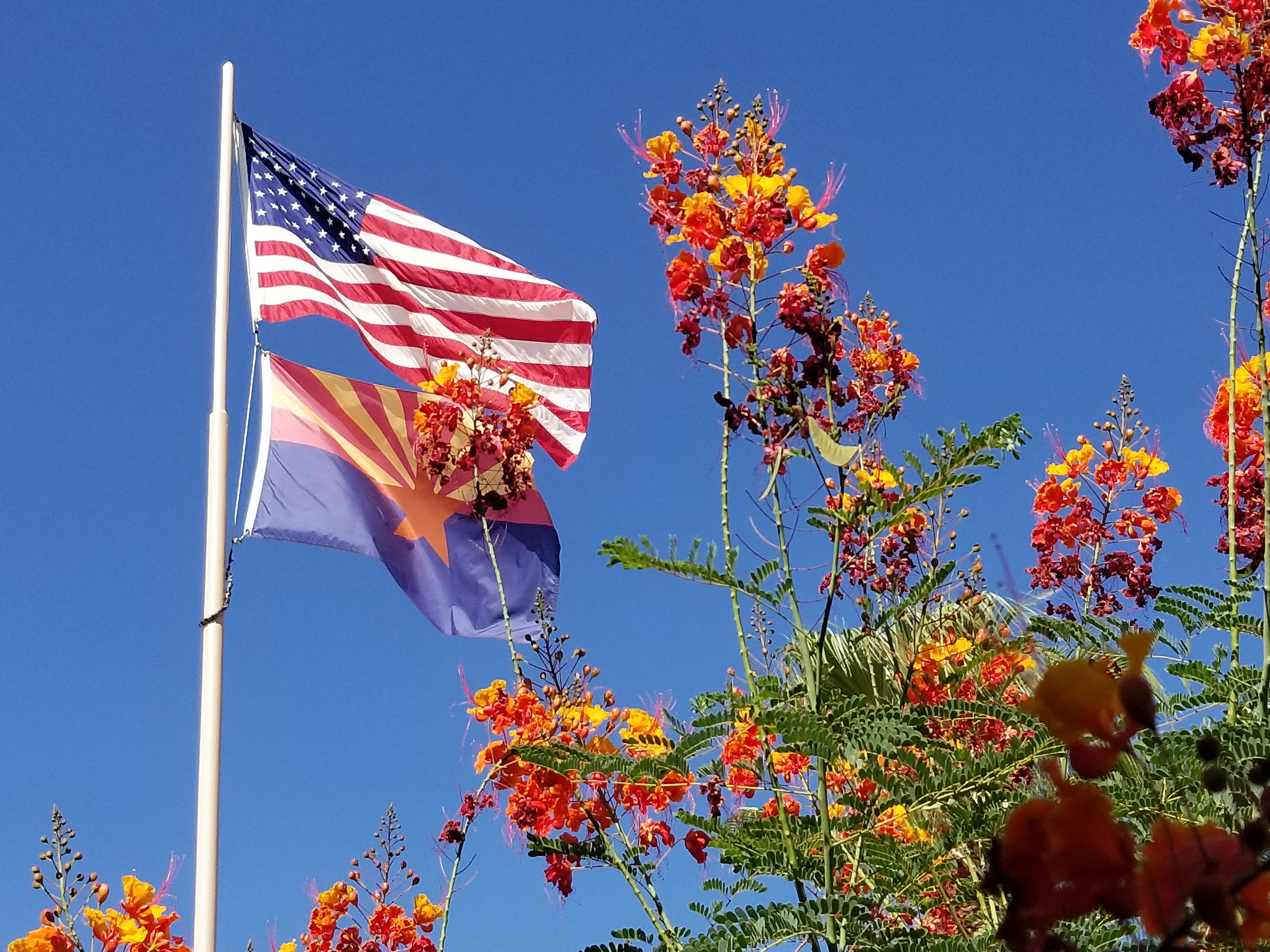
A photo of some flowers (Caesalpinia pulcherrima) near the US flag at ACP Middle School. (formerly ACP Erie)

The first college preparatory junior high and high school program in the Chandler Unified School District was Hamilton Prep, opened in 2007. Hamilton Prep served grades 7 through 12 and operated using space rented from Chandler Christian Church. Hamilton Prep offered its own junior high sports teams, but high school athletics was routed through the bigger Hamilton High School, with which it also shared colors and mascot. However, in 2010, the district was looking for a more permanent location for the successful Hamilton Prep program. Erie Elementary School at 1150 W Erie St, a school with declining enrollment in an older part of Chandler, was selected for the renovations to begin to convert the site into the Hamilton Prep high school. The school continued operations during the 2011–12 school year with portions cordoned off for construction. $8.6 million was spent on renovations, $3.3 million more than anticipated due to an expanded scope of the project and due to higher than budgeted costs for utility work.

Meanwhile, Chandler Unified School District opened Chandler Traditional Junior High in 2009 at 191 W Oakland St. The school was meant to be an extension of the Chandler Traditional Academy (CTA) elementary program.

For the 2011–12 school year, the name of Hamilton Prep and Chandler Traditional Junior High was changed to Arizona College Prep. The Hamilton Prep campus was renamed ACP Erie and the Chandler Traditional Junior High campus was renamed ACP Oakland.

In early 2017, it was decided that the 7th and 8th-grade classes at ACP Erie (which served grades 7–12) would be transferred to ACP Oakland (which served grades 6–8). In late 2019, the move was complete; ACP Erie served grades 9-12 and ACP Oakland served grades 6–8.

== New High School Campus ==
In late 2020, CUSD released its first design plans for a new high school at 4477 S Gilbert Rd to be open in the 2021–2022 school year due to Chandler's growing population. The following year, the CUSD governing board voted unanimously to move ACP Erie students to the new campus as well as change some of the high school enrollment boundaries for the 2021–2022 school year. ACP Oakland would move to ACP Erie's previous campus location to allow for more facilities. ACP Oakland was renamed ACP Middle School and ACP Erie was renamed ACP High School because of the campus change for both schools.

The new ACP High School campus includes the school's own sports facilities, including Dr. Fred DePrez Stadium, which ended the school's need to "borrow" other premises for a home field.

Arizona College Prep (ACP) consists of two campuses for middle school and high school separately. ACP Middle School (previously ACP Oakland) is located at 1150 W Erie St and serves grades 6–8. ACP High School (previously ACP Erie) is located at 4477 S Gilbert Rd and serves grades 9–12.
