= Skaggs Catholic Center =

Church and school campus in Utah, USA

Coordinates: 40°32′12″N 111°52′53″W

The Skaggs Catholic Center is a 57 acres (230,000 m^{2}) school and church campus in Draper, Utah, United States. It is the location of Juan Diego Catholic High School, Saint John the Baptist Middle School, Saint John the Baptist Elementary School, Guardian Angel Daycare, and the St. John the Baptist Parish Catholic church. Opened in 1999, the campus was funded by Leonard Samuel (Sam) Skaggs, Jr. (retired chairman of American Stores) and his wife Ailene, who donated $42 million to build the facility as a flagship for the Catholic community in predominantly-Mormon Utah. (Sam Skaggs was not a Catholic at the time he conceived the idea, although he later converted.) Upon its opening, the facility was reported to be the largest Catholic education campus in the United States, and the largest gift made for Catholic primary and secondary education.

== St. John the Baptist Parish ==
St. John the Baptist Parish is a Roman Catholic parish located in Draper, Utah. It is part of the Skaggs Catholic Center along with Juan Diego Catholic High School, Saint John the Baptist Middle School, Saint John the Baptist Elementary School, and Guardian Angel Daycare.
