= Dakota Cox =

American football player (born 1994)

No. 59
- Position: Linebacker

Personal information
- Born: November 5, 1994 (age 32); Sandy, Utah, U.S.
- Listed height: 6 ft 0 in (1.83 m)
- Listed weight: 235 lb (107 kg)

Career information
- High school: Juan Diego (Draper, Utah)
- College: New Mexico (2013–2016)
- NFL draft: 2017: undrafted

Career history
- Minnesota Vikings (2017)*
- * Offseason or practice squad member only

Awards and highlights
- First-team MWC (2014)

Dakota Mitchell Cox (born November 5, 1994) is an American former football linebacker for the New Mexico Lobos.

== Early life ==
Cox attended Juan Diego Catholic High School in Utah. Cox was named first-team All-State his junior and senior years. He finished his career with 286 tackles, five sacks, and three interceptions. On offense, he recorded 32 receptions for 605 yards and 10 touchdowns. He scored another two touchdowns on 19 carries for 164 yards. He also played ice hockey and ran track. On June 14, 2012, Cox committed to Cincinnati, but later committed to New Mexico on December 16.

== College career ==
=== Freshman year ===
As a freshman, Cox led the Lobos with 100 total tackles. He was named Football Writers Association of America (FWAA) Freshman All-American.

=== Sophomore year ===
Led the Lobos with 116 total tackles. On the season, Cox led the NCAA with 12.9 tackles per game. His strong performance earned him First-team Mountain West Conference. On September 22, 2014, Cox recorded 18 total tackles and an interception in a win against New Mexico State, earning him MWC Defensive Player of the Week. His season was cut short after tearing his ACL against Boise State in week 9.

=== Junior year ===
Cox led the Lobos in total tackles for the third consecutive season, recording 97 along with a career-high 5.0 sacks and 11.0 tackles for loss. He recorded eight tackles in the Gildan New Mexico Bowl against Arizona.

=== Senior year ===
On September 5, 2016, Cox recorded 14 total tackles, a sack, forced fumble and interception against South Dakota. His performance earned him MWC Defensive Player of the Week for the second time in his career. He finished the season with 91 tackles, becoming the first Lobo in school history to lead the team in tackles four consecutive seasons. In his Lobos career, Cox finished sixth in career tackles. He was a three-time captain from 2014 to 2016. In his final game, he recorded 10 total tackles in a victory against UTSA in the 2016 New Mexico Bowl. His performance earned him Defensive Player of the Game.

=== Statistics ===
Season	Team	Games		Tackles					Interceptions					Fumbles			
Season	Team	GP	GS	Cmb	Solo	Ast	Sck	TFL	Int	Yds	Lng	TD	PD	FF	FR	Yds	TD
2013	New Mexico	13	9	100	51	49	0.0	2.0	0	0	0	0	1	0	0	0	0
2014	New Mexico	9	9	116	39	77	0.0	2.0	1	16	16	0	2	0	1	0	0
2015	New Mexico	13	13	97	49	48	5.0	11.0	1	8	8	0	1	0	0	0	0
2016	New Mexico	12	12	91	51	40	2.0	6.5	1	0	0	0	2	1	0	0	0
Career		46	43	404	190	214	7.0	21.5	3	24	16	0	6	1	1	0	0

== Professional career ==
Pre-draft measurables
Height	Weight	Arm length	Hand span	40-yard dash	10-yard split	20-yard split	20-yard shuttle	Three-cone drill	Vertical jump	Broad jump
6 ft 0 in (1.83 m)	226 lb (103 kg)	30 5/8 in (0.78 m)	8 7/8 in (0.23 m)	4.72 s	N/A s	N/A s	4.52 s	7.36 s	33.5 in (0.85 m)	9 ft 6 in (2.90 m)
All values from NFL Pro Day

In 2017, Cox spent time in training camp with the Minnesota Vikings.

== Personal life ==
Cox's father Tom played in the NFL for a part of the 1987 season. His younger brother Chandler played Miami Dolphins.
