= Metis Classification =

Library classification system

Metis is a Dewey-free library classification system developed and implemented in 2011 by Sue Giffard, Tali Balas Kaplan, Jennifer Still, and Andrea Dolloff, the librarians at the Ethical Culture School in New York City. The system places the thinking, interests, information needs and information-seeking behavior of children at its center. It was developed as an alternative to the Dewey Decimal Classification System and the practices which customarily accompany that system in school and public libraries in the United States: namely, the alphabetical arrangement of fiction by author, and the frequent arrangement of biographies in alphabetical order by biographee. The Metis system (named for Metis the Titan who was the mother of Athena in Greek mythology) was designed to encourage productive independent browsing by children, as well as allowing for successful catalog searching by elementary school students.

== Theoretical foundations ==
Metis draws on a number of sources for its foundational ideas and approach. A number of authors have stressed the importance of browsing potential in a successful classification system, notably A.C. Foskett and Robert Losee. This suggested the need to investigate browsing and information-seeking behavior. Similarly, Thomas's contention that in constructing a classification system one needed to "use communally accepted patterns of subject order and relationships" showed a need to investigate children's modes of categorizing information. Linda Cooper's work was extremely influential in this regard. From a more general education perspective, the work in devising Metis was deeply influenced by the fact that the Ethical Culture School library is part of a progressive elementary school, where children's developmental needs are given a central importance. At the level of library practice, Metis was influenced by the work done at the Rangeview Public Library, the Markham Public Library, the Children's Department at the Darien Library, and Lyn Donbroski's article about innovations at the East Sussex County Library in the early 1980s.

== Features ==
The stated aims of the system (introduction to Metis schedules) are that it is child-centered and flexible. The 26 main categories and their accompanying sub-categories were devised with reference to the research of Linda Cooper, in her investigations of the categorizing behavior of children from Kindergarten through Grade 4. The system dispenses with coded call numbers, except that the order of the 26 main categories are fixed in alphabetical order using a single alphabetical letter, e.g. A: Facts; B: Machines, C: Science, D: Nature, E: Animals, F: Pets, etc. Aside from this, the call numbers use whole language. Except for chapter book fiction, memoirs, graphic novels and poetry, author cutter numbers are mostly dispensed with. The subcategories are mostly in alphabetical order.

Middle grades fiction, which is primarily in the form of chapter books, is divided by genre. Lower grades work, which is mostly picture books, is divided by topic (e.g. dogs, bullying, trucks, etc.) regardless of whether the book is fiction or nonfiction; instead, the fiction status is indicated by colorblind-friendly color coding on the spines.

Some of the main categories differ markedly from the Dewey main classes. One example is Making Stuff, which includes anything which children like to do for fun, including arts and crafts, collections, games, cooking, putting on plays, and magic tricks. Another is Mystery, which includes nonfiction on codes, crime, optical illusions, puzzles, spies and unexplained mysteries such as the Bermuda Triangle, as well as mystery and detective fiction.

The system also includes a visual aspect, whereby each book in a main category has a visual label that reflects that category, in addition to a call number consisting of words.

While there are aspects of the system that were devised specifically for the layout and geography of the original library, the system is flexible, so that it can be changed to accommodate different layouts and set-ups, as well as differences in users and collection emphases.

== Main categories ==
These main categories have sub-categories, which are laid out in full in the Metis Categorization Schedules.

1. Facts/Concepts
2. Machines
3. Science
4. Nature
5. Animals
6. Pets
7. Making Stuff
8. Arts
9. Sports
10. Ourselves
11. Community
12. USA (Then and Now)
13. Countries (Then and Now)
14. Languages
15. Traditions
16. Tales
17. Verse
18. Humor
19. Mystery
20. Adventure
21. Scary
22. Graphic
23. Memoir
24. Fiction/Picture Stories
25. Beginning Fiction
26. Middle Fiction

== Reactions and responses ==
An article written by the creators of the system and published in School Library Journal in their October 2012 issue prompted a variety of responses, from criticism that the system was "dumbing down" libraries, and concern that students would not be able to find their way in other libraries, to positive responses, particularly from some librarians who had already tried alternative classification. In addition, a Twitter chat on the topic hosted by School Library Journal prompted a lively discussion of the issues and a wide variety of responses.

In the Ethical Culture School library, librarians reported an immediate increase in circulation, particularly in non-curricular areas: for example, they noted an 87% increase in the arts and crafts section ("Making Stuff") during the first three months after implementation of the new system. In their article in the School Library Journal, they reported a positive response from faculty and parents as well as students. Nancy Daigle has successfully replicated this system in her central Vermont library at Brookside Primary School, serving students in a preK-4 school. Children do not typically learn decimals until the end of fourth grade, and 97% of her students reported that they had, on occasion, been unable to find what they were looking for in the library. She re-catalogued her library's collection based on topic and genre, replacing the Dewey Decimal System with METIS, which was adapted from the system used at the Ethical Culture School in New York.
