= St. Mary's High School (Phoenix, Arizona) =

Private, coeducational school

Location
- 2525 North Third Street; Phoenix, Maricopa County, Arizona 85004; United States; 33°28′31″N 112°4′8″W

Information
- Type: Private, coeducational
- Religious affiliation: Roman Catholic
- Established: 1917
- Oversight: Diocese of Phoenix
- Principal: Tanya Bartlett
- Grades: 9–12
- Age: 14 to 18
- Enrollment: 490 (2020)
- Average class size: 18-24
- Colors: Green and white
- Slogan: "Once a Knight, Always a Knight"
- Mascot: Knight
- Team name: Knights
- Accreditation: North Central Association of Colleges and Schools
- Publication: Knightline
- Endowment: $1,000,000+
- Tuition: Full $16,000/year; participating Catholic $12,500/year for 2020-2021
- Website: www.smknights.org

St. Mary's Catholic High School is a private, Roman Catholic high school in Phoenix, Arizona, United States. It is located in the Roman Catholic Diocese of Phoenix.

== History ==
Saint Mary's High School was the first Catholic high school in Arizona, and has been part of the Greater Phoenix Metropolitan area since 1917. St. Mary's was founded by the Sisters of the Precious Blood. The founders set aside classroom space for four boys and ten girls at St. Anthony's Elementary school. This was the beginning of the Saint Mary's community.

In 1920, Saint Mary's moved into its first, one-story home located on East Monroe Street. In 1928, all male students were transferred to Brophy College Preparatory School on North Central Avenue, leaving Saint Mary's school an all-girls facility. The Great Depression caused financial problems, leading to the closure of Brophy in 1936. The boys were temporarily without a Catholic high school. Male students moved back to St. Mary's, but this time into a new building. During the 1930s, one city block, bordered from Polk to Taylor and Second to Third Streets, had been purchased for $24,000. With this new land, a second Saint Mary's was built by the Franciscans whose goal was to educate those boys displaced by the closure of Brophy High School.

The separation of boys' and girls' schools lasted until 1958. By the end of 1958, the girls' school was condemned to make way for the Civic Plaza. Both schools were combined, making it mixed-gender once again. As a result of boys and girls attending the same facility, it became necessary to add classrooms. On March 20, 1961, Reverend Francis J. Green, O.D., Bishop of Tucson, performed the dedication ceremony for the new seven-room addition to the school, including a ramada and a library.

The Polk Street campus, built on 2 acres (8,100 m^{2}), had a total of twenty-four classrooms and a gymnasium. There was a maximum of six hundred students, from very diverse backgrounds. The student body was approximately 90% Hispanic, 0% Anglo and 10% African American. The ravages of time and the rapid development of downtown Phoenix caused Saint Mary's to halt its growth on their inner-city campus. In 1988, Saint Mary's was razed to make room for the Arizona Center. The school moved to its present location at Third Street and Sheridan, renovated existing buildings, and constructed a multi-purpose building to house administration, classrooms, and a cafeteria. In 2007, the Virginia Piper building was completed, which houses fine arts classrooms, computer labs, and the 275-seat Wiegand Auditorium.

== Gymnasium ==
Financial constraints prevented the school from building a gym at the Third Street and Sheridan campus; a new facility was estimated to cost the school $1.2 million. With help from the community the construction of the Saint Mary's gym began. A nearby defunct Catholic high school, Gerard Catholic High School, left behind a prefabricated metal building that had housed a gymnasium. A former graduate of Saint Mary's was able to contact a contractor who agreed to relocate the steel superstructure. After this first step was completed, volunteers pulled together and began creating a gym from parts of other buildings all over the city. The project cost approximately $400,000. After a donation of $100,000 from a charitable trust was matched, St. Mary's borrowed the remaining $200,000 from the Diocese of Phoenix. The flooding of Camelback High School's gymnasium was another advantage. The school's athletic program could not afford the time and risk of trying to dry out the maple floor. With the insurance company's permission, Saint Mary's took the donated wet wood to dry out in a warehouse. For the lights, scoreboards, and backboards another Phoenix school was soon to be demolished and was also a source. The source of 36,000 pounds of tile for the locker rooms and showers was the donation of another destroyed building. The two-story gym was also fortunate to boast an elevator donated by a former graduate. Altogether, Saint Mary's was able to reuse materials for its gym.

== Notable alumni ==
- Jerryd Bayless, former NBA player
- Steve Belles, gridiron football player
- Zylan Cheatham, Small Forward for the Birmingham Squadron for the NBA G League
- Dallas Escobedo, pitcher for the Pennsylvania Rebellion
- Andre Ethier, outfielder for the Los Angeles Dodgers (MLB)
- Nick Evans, outfielder/infielder for the Arizona Diamondbacks (MLB)
- Channing Frye, former NBA player. Won a championship with the Cleveland Cavaliers in 2016.
- Justin Hickman, defensive end/linebacker for the Indianapolis Colts (NFL)
- Bill Kennedy, referee for the NBA
- Terry Kennedy, former catcher for the San Diego Padres (MLB); 4x MLB All-Star
- Keaton Kristick, former linebacker for the San Francisco 49ers (NFL)
- Brian Matusz, pitcher for the Baltimore Orioles and Chicago Cubs (MLB)
- Damon Pieri, former defensive back for the New York Jets/Carolina Panthers (NFL)
- Elena "Baby Doll" Reid, professional boxer and mixed martial artist
- Kevin Scott, former safety for the Detroit Lions (NFL)
- Alexandra Shipp, actress (Aaliyah: The Princess of R&B, X-Men: Apocalypse)
- Dymond Simon, point guard for the Phoenix Mercury (WNBA)
- Davellyn Whyte, shooting guard for the San Antonio Stars (WNBA)
- Alan Wirth, former pitcher for the Oakland Athletics (MLB)
