= Juan Diego Catholic High School =

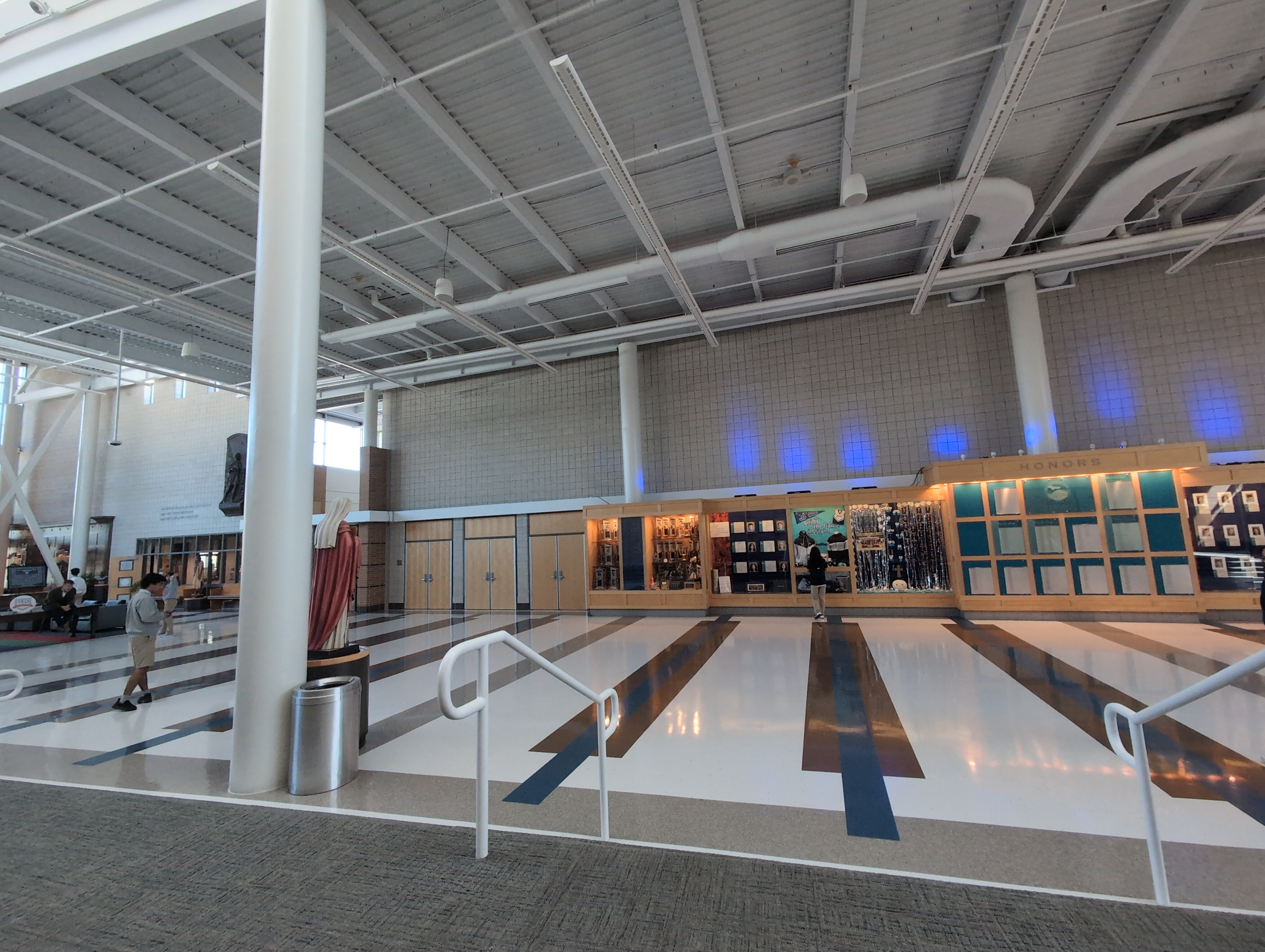

Location
- 300 11800 S Draper, Salt Lake, Utah 84020; United States; 40°32′05″N 111°52′55″W

Information
- Type: Regular elementary or secondary
- Motto: "Spiritus Donorum" (The Spirit of Giving)
- Religious affiliation: Roman Catholic
- Patron saint: Juan Diego
- Established: 1999
- Status: Currently operational
- Locale: Large suburb / 21
- School district: Diocese of Salt Lake City
- CEEB code: 450064
- NCES School ID: A0109539
- Principal: Vanessa Jacobs
- Secondary years taught: 9th through 12th grades
- Enrollment: 733 (2025-2026)
- Student to teacher ratio: 17
- Language: English
- Hours in school day: 7
- Colors: Navy, Silver, White, and Teal
- Mascot: Soaring Eagle
- Accreditation: Western Catholic Educational Association (WCEA)
- Yearbook: The Tilma
- Tuition: $25,000/year
- Website: www.skaggscatholiccenter.org
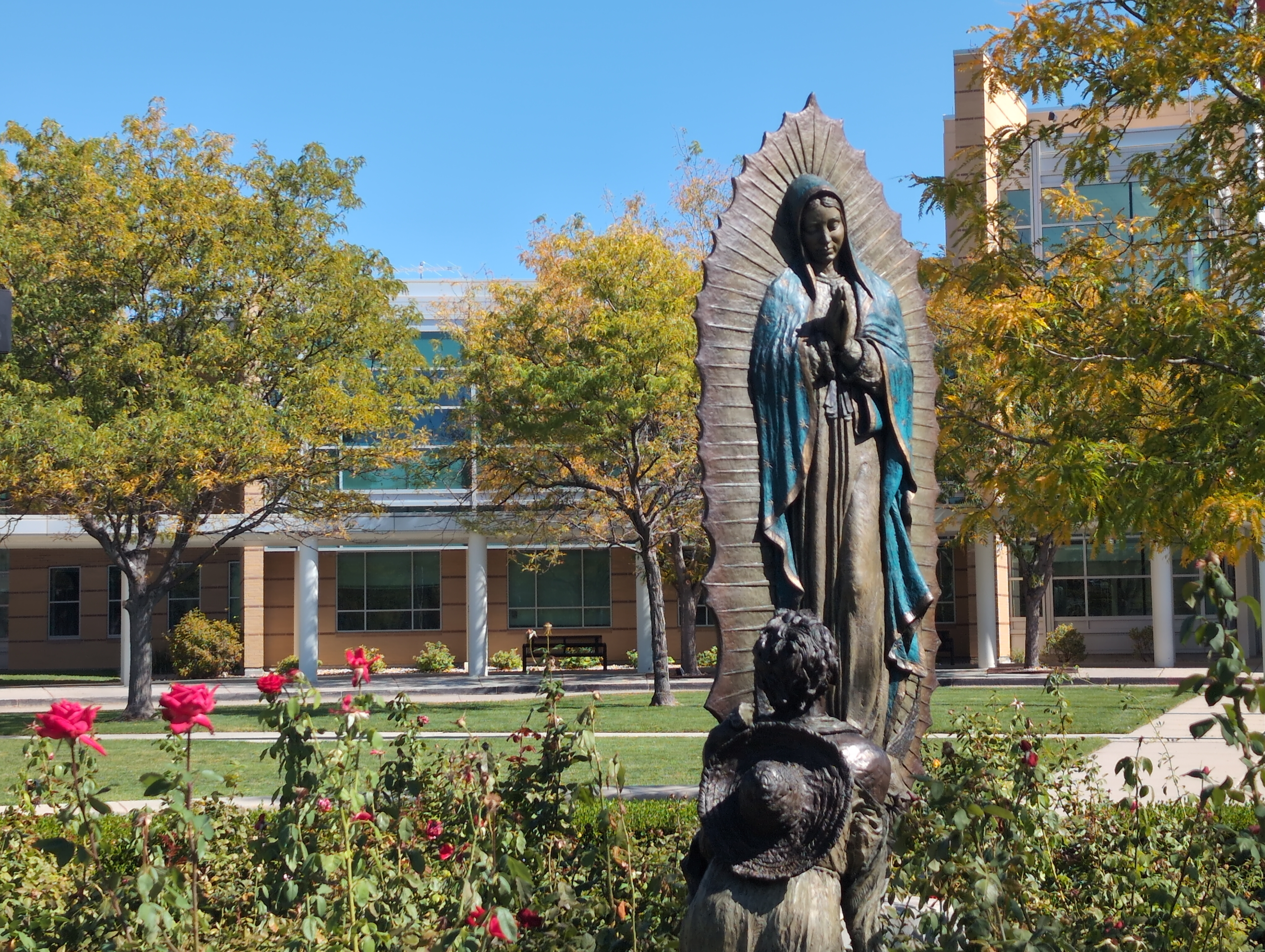

Juan Diego Catholic High School (JDCHS) is a private, Catholic high school located in the Salt Lake City suburb of Draper, Utah, operated by the Roman Catholic Diocese of Salt Lake City.

== History ==
American Stores's Chief Executive Officer Leonard Samuel Skaggs made an initial donation of $42 million to the Diocese of Salt Lake City for the purpose of providing primary and secondary education. At the time, Skaggs' donation was the largest donation for a Catholic education campus in the United States.

A 57 acres (230,000 m^{2}) site was selected in southern Salt Lake City and started developing for the Skaggs Catholic Center where Juan Diego Catholic resides. The property was selected due to its proximity to the St. John the Baptist Parish. All of the schools which makeup the Skaggs Catholic Center would open for the 1999–2000 school year.

== Academics ==
=== Accolades ===
During the 2019–20 school year, Secretary Betsy DeVos of the United States Department of Education awarded Juan Diego Catholic with the Blue Ribbon Award.

== Extracurricular activities ==
=== Athletics ===
Juan Diego Catholic is a Utah High School Activities Association (UHSAA) member school offering boys and girls sports complying with Title IX. Student athletes can participate in varsity, junior varsity, and freshmen only teams under the UHSAA's 4A Classification. JDCHS Athletics consisting of the following sports:

- Baseball
- Basketball (Boys/Girls)
- Cross Country (Boys/Girls)
- Football
- Golf (Boys/Girls)
- Lacrosse (Boys/Girls)
- Soccer (Boys/Girls)
- Softball
- Swim and Dive (Boys/Girls)
- Tennis (Boys/Girls)
- Track and field (Boys/Girls)
- Volleyball (Boys/Girls)
- Wrestling

Starting during the 2017–18 school year JDCHS won the Best of State Award which is a collective academic and athletic honors for 3 consecutive years.

==== Football ====
Coach	Seasons	W	L	T	Pct.	State Title	Runners-up	Region Title	Notes
John Colosimo	1999-2020	176	42	0	.777	7		13	USA Today’s 2013 Best High School Coach Award for Utah
Greg Williams	2021-	0	0	0	.000	0	0	0	Incoming head coach
Total	22	176	42	0	.777	7		13	

The JDCHS football team would first competed under the UHSAA in 1999 with head coach John Colosimo guided JDCHS becoming instantly successful. They have since went on to win four state championships at the 3A classification during the 2008, 2009, 2010, and 2016 seasons. In all, Colosimo's teams have won 7 Utah State Championships and has one of the winningest records in Utah.

In 2018, JDCHS and Colosimo hired the embattled coach Steve Belles of Arizona's Hamilton High School program after a multi-year investigation into pervasive hazing. Investigators recommended child abuse charges but Attorney General Bill Montgomery never formalized the charges. At JDCHS, he would assume the position coach duties for the quarterback and defensive back.

=== Rivalry ===
The team defeated rival Hurricane High School from 2008 to 2010 at Rice-Eccles Stadium and Delta at Cedar City in 2016.

== In popular culture ==
- Everwood (2002–2006) – Television show – Used JDCHS buildings and surroundings for filming as a substitute for the fictional Everwood, Colorado
- The Luck of the Irish (2001) – Made for television movie – Used JDCHS buildings and surroundings for filming
- The Jerk Theory (2008) – Made for television movie – Used JDCHS uniforms, buildings and surroundings as the setting

== Campus ==
JDCHS occupies a section on a multicampus grouping called the Skaggs Catholic Center with Saint John the Baptist Middle School, Saint John the Baptist Elementary School, and the Guardian Angel Day Care taking the remainder of the instructional space. The remaining land, from the initial 57 acres (230,000 m^{2}) purchased by the Roman Catholic Diocese of Salt Lake City, also contains St. John the Baptist Parish.

== Notable people ==
=== Faculty ===
- Steve Belles - NFL/AFL Quarterback - Varsity Quarterback and Defensive Backs Coach
- Ron James - NCAA/AFL/CFL Offensive Lineman and Coach - Varsity Head Football Coach

=== Alumni ===
- Dakota Cox, professional football player
- Haylee Roderick, model
- Sofia Franklyn, podcast host
