= Zach Bauman =

American gridiron football player (born 1992)

No. 35
- Position: Running back

Personal information
- Born: July 24, 1992 (age 34); Chandler, Arizona, U.S.
- Listed height: 5 ft 10 in (1.78 m)
- Listed weight: 200 lb (91 kg)

Career information
- High school: Hamilton
- College: Northern Arizona University
- NFL draft: 2014: undrafted

Career history
- Arizona Cardinals (2014)*; Edmonton Eskimos (2015)*
- * Offseason or practice squad member only
- Stats at Pro Football Reference

Zachary Jordan Bauman (born July 24, 1992) is an American former football running back. He played college football for the Northern Arizona University Lumberjacks. He was considered one of the top running backs in FCS history, being one of only nine players to rush for 1,000+ yards four times .

== Playing career ==
=== Northern Arizona ===
Baumann played college football for the Northern Arizona Lumberjacks in the NCAA Division I Football Championship Subdivision (FCS) from 2010 to 2013. He was considered one of the top running backs in the FCS that year. While at Northern Arizona, he rushed for at least 1,000 yards for all four years of his eligibility, including 1,456 yards and 10 touchdowns as a senior. He was named to the first team in the Big Sky Conference three times.

=== Arizona Cardinals ===
The Arizona Cardinals signed Bauman to their practice squad on October 28, 2014. He was signed on December 16, 2014. On May 5, 2015, he was released by the Cardinals.

In the preseason of 2014, Bauman scored a touchdown on what was called the "most bizarre TD of early NFL preseason" in a game against the Minnesota Vikings. The play highlighted the rule that the center's snap to the quarterback is considered a backward pass and not a handoff, therefore the dropped ball was not a fumble and could be advanced. Bauman picked up the ball from the turf and ran it six yards for a touchdown.

Bauman participated in The Spring League in 2017.
