= Viputheshwar Sitaraman =

American graphic designer (born 1997)

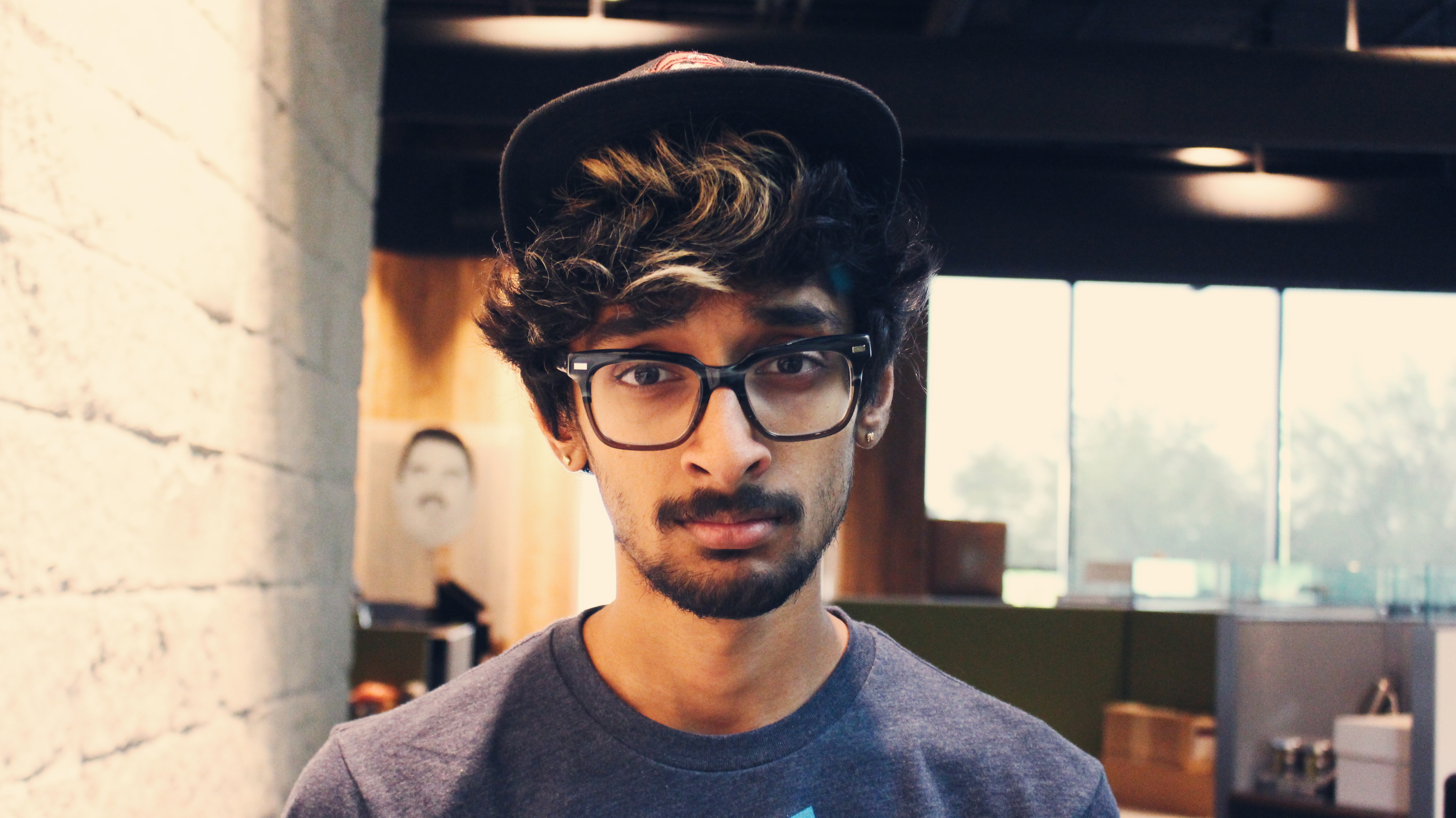
- Born: 10 September 1997 (age 28); Theni, Tamil Nadu, India
- Education: University of Arizona
- Occupations: Graphic designer, startup entrepreneur

Viputheshwar "Vip" Sitaraman (born 10 September 1997) is an American designer, entrepreneur, and scientist. In May 2016, Sitaraman made headlines when, at age 18, he graduated from the University of Arizona and his company was funded by Seed Sumo, a startup accelerator in Bryan, Texas. Sitaraman is one of the youngest people to raise a round of venture capital. He has been interviewed on Forbes, Entrepreneur, Business Insider, The Huffington Post, and Times Higher Education.

== Personal life ==
Sitaraman was born in Theni, Tamil Nadu, India, in 1997 to Sitaraman Venkatasubramanian, a software engineer, and Swarna Sitaraman, an interior designer & artist. Shortly after Sitaraman was born, the family moved to the United States, where they settled in Chandler, Arizona.

Through his early education, Sitaraman showed a propensity for science. He competed in science & engineering fairs, collecting accolades including Intel International Science & Engineering Fair (ISEF) Finalist, TGen Helios Scholar-designate, Society for in Vitro Biology ISEF Award, and several state and local awards. Sitaraman published his research on engineered zinc finger nucleases in the World Forum in Biology.

In August 2014, Sitaraman enrolled at the University of Arizona under the Flinn Scholarship. Within two years, he graduated with a Bachelor of Science degree in Molecular & Cellular Biology, along with a minor in African American Studies. Sitaraman would later explain in an interview, "None of this was part of the plan. I was a pre-med student; entrepreneurship wasn't even in my vocabulary." Sitaraman co-founded KorkBoard, a digital event bulletin mobile app striving to build stronger campus communities. Following the launch on the Apple Store for iOS, the startup was accepted to the Thryve Incubator Spring/Summer 2015 Cohort in Tucson, Arizona and the Facebook FbStart 2015 Cohort.

== Career ==
=== Draw Science ===
Draw Science started as a small blog Sitaraman built in high school, aimed at translating science with art. In the next year, Draw Science garnered over 2 million views, syndication by Business Insider, and invitations to conferences including ARCSCon in Philadelphia and the Lindau Nobel Laureate Meetings in Lindau, Bavaria. In August 2015, Sitaraman launched a crowdfunding campaign to scale Draw Science into an academic publishing organization focused on creation of graphical abstracts. In following months, Draw Science worked with prominent scientific organizations including PeerJ, the USDA, and Elsevier. Graphics created by the Draw Science team have been featured in Newsweek, VICE, and Gizmodo and clientele including Hillary Clinton, American Scientist, and Soylent.

=== Explica ===
Sitaraman raised a round of funding from Seed Sumo, a startup accelerator based out of Austin, Texas in May 2016. During the accelerator, Sitaraman launched Explica, a visual news site for millennials. In November 2016, the company raised an undisclosed seed round of venture capital after growing to several million monthly readers.

=== Recognition ===
Sitaraman has made several press appearances including Forbes, NPR/Public Media, Inc., Business Insider, The Huffington Post, and Times Highered Education, as well as several regional news publications. He has also spoken at several conferences, including TEDx and MDMC.
