= Basha High School =

Public school in Chandler, Arizona

- Home of the Bears

Location
- 5990 S. Val Vista Dr. Chandler, Arizona; 33°13′14″N 111°45′27″W

Information
- Type: Public
- Established: 2002
- Status: Currently operational
- Locale: City, Large (11)
- School district: Chandler Unified School District
- NCES District ID: 0401870
- CEEB code: 030037
- NCES School ID: 040187002250
- Principal: Marques Reischl
- Faculty: 140.13
- Teaching staff: 146.93 (FTE)
- Grades: 6–12
- Enrollment: 2,826 (2023–2024)
  - Grade 6: 118
  - Grade 7: 114
  - Grade 8: 115
  - Grade 9: 625
  - Grade 10: 670
  - Grade 11: 602
  - Grade 12: 582
- Student to teacher ratio: 20.17
- Colors: Green, Vegas gold, and black
- Athletics conference: 6A
- Mascot: Bear
- Newspaper: Basha Bear Network (BBN)
- Website: bhs.cusd80.com

Basha High School is a public high school located in Chandler, Arizona

== History ==
Basha High School was named after Eddie Basha Jr., who donated millions of dollars to the Chandler Unified School District (CUSD) and lived in the community until his death in 2013.

== Academics ==
Basha's curriculum is aligned with the standards set by the Arizona Department of Education and implements the state's Education and Career Action Plan (ECAP) required for all students grades 9–12 graduating from a publicly funded high school. CUSD high schools also implements an open enrollment policy, meaning students from outside the intended school boundaries may attend without tuition or other penalties.

Arizona requires that all high school students take 6 credit bearing courses during their freshmen through junior years, and provides the option for students on track for graduation the ability to reduce their course load to 4 credit bearing courses. However, CUSD requires all students must complete 22 credits whereas the public university system controlled by the Arizona Board of Regents requires only 16 credits in the following areas:

- English - 4 credits
- Mathematics - 4 credits
- Science - 3 credits
- Social Studies. - 3 credits
- Career and Technical Educator/Fine Arts - 1 credit
- Physical Education - 1 credit
- Comprehensive Health - 1/2 credits
- Elective Courses - 5 1/2 credits

=== Cross-credit courses ===
At Basha and all CUSD high school students may swap two semesters (1/2 credits per semester) of Spiritline, Beginning through Advance Dance, Drill Team, Color Guard, Marching Band, Winter guard, or AFJROTC essentially waiving the required one Physical Education credit required for graduation.

Students which choose applied sciences in areas such as Applied Biology or Applied Agricultural Sciences gain equivalent Science credits. Likewise, Economics credits can be awarded like Agricultural Business Management, Business, Business Applications, Marketing, Economics Applications, Family and Consumer Sciences, and vocational courses.

Community college credits can be awarded through a partnership with Chandler-Gilbert Community College (CGCC) and cooperative credits for vocational courses are provided by East Valley Institute of Technology (EVIT). Students must be dually enrolled for the Arizona community college or the Arizona public university system to accept the credits towards a degree. CUSD Transportation Department provides routes between Basha, EVIT, and CGCC with after school hours transportation intended for students participating in activities.

Separate from EVIT and CGCC, the University of Arizona implemented a pilot program to get university credits for students pursuing introductory engineering courses starting in 2014.

== Athletics ==
Basha is an Arizona Interscholastic Association (AIA) member school offering boys and girls sports adhering to Chandler Unified School District (CUSD) Title IX compliance. Student athletes can participate in varsity, junior varsity, and freshmen only teams as well as individual sports under the AIA's 6A Conference. Basha Athletics consist of these sports:

- Badminton (Girls)‡
- Baseball
- Basketball (Boys and Girls)
- Beach Volleyball (Boys and Girls)‡
- Cheer (Girls and Coed)
- Cross Country (Boys and Girls)†
- Flag football
- Football
- Golf (Boys and Girls)†
- Hockey
- Lacrosse (Boys and Girls)
- Pomline
- Soccer (Boys and Girls)
- Softball
- Swim and Dive (Boys and Girls)†
- Tennis (Boys and Girls)‡
- Track and field (Boys and Girls)†
- Volleyball (Boys and Girls)‡
- Wrestling (Boys and Girls)
- † denotes individual and team sports
- ‡ denotes individual, doubles, and team sports

Each sport is funded by the school, yet additional funds are raised through boosters creating 501(c)(3) non-profit organization, donations, and tax credits.

=== Softball ===
The Basha girls' softball team has won two state titles in back-to-back years (2008 and 2009), and another in the 2022-2023 season.

=== Basketball ===
The Basha Boys Basketball team won the Arizona state championship in 2017.

=== Football ===
The Basha Bears won the 2022 State Open Championship, the highest-tiered Arizona high school football title.

The Basha Bears Football team also won the 2025 State Open Championship. Leading to the team securing a top 25 ranking nationally by MaxPreps.

== Other extracurricular activities ==
While Hamilton Athletics is a completely voluntary, the Marching Band and Robotics programs can garner academic credits if the student opts into taking them as elective credits.

=== Competitive musical programs ===
The Basha Bear Regiment won their first state championship in Division II in 2009, and the Indoor Percussion Ensemble won eight consecutive state championships from 2007 through 2014 and again in 2019. The Basha Winter Winds ensemble also won the state championships in 2019.

== Campus ==
Basha High has a branch of the Chandler Public Library within the school.

== Notable alumni ==
- Allan Bower, artistic gymnast and member of Team USA at the 2020 Tokyo Olympics
- Brennen Davis, baseball player
- Casey Legumina, pitcher for the Seattle Mariners
- Jamie Westbrook, member of Team USA Baseball at the 2020 Tokyo Olympics
- Demond Williams Jr., college football quarterback for the Washington Huskies
