= BISAC Subject Headings =

Method to classify books

The BISAC Subject Headings are a method to classify books that is geared towards bookstores. It is mainly used by the Northern American booktrade, and online sellers like Barnes & Noble, Amazon and Baker & Taylor. The Book Industry Study Group maintains the BISAC system.

BISAC, an acronym for Book Industry Standards and Communications, classifies all works by topics. All topics and sub-topics are ordered alphabetically, which also encompasses works of fiction. The BISAC's numbering scheme allows for a later introduction of new topics between already established ones.

Books can fall into several categories. In this case, BISG recommends that no more than three categories should be chosen for a single book, and the main category should be the one that best describes the book's contents.

== Examples ==
In the BISAC system, Biography and Autobiographies (BIO) comes before works of Fiction (FIC) and Religion (REL). Within Fiction, FIC009020 (Fiction: Fantasy: Epic) is followed by Gaslamp fantasy novels (FIC009130, Fiction: Fantasy: Gaslamp) due to the alphabetic sorting.

As a drawback, it does not keep fictional works together if they were written by the same author. For example, Stefan Zweig's novel that re-tells the Magellan expedition would be filed under FIC014030 (Fiction: History: Historical: Renaissance). His Fear, however, could be classified as FIC025000 (Fiction: Psychological). Some libraries, though, have decided to group one novelist's works under the same topic if the author has shown a clear preference for one.

== Adoption by libraries ==
In order to address the shortcomings of the Dewey Decimal Classification, some libraries have changed to the BISAC classification. Some reasons given were BISAC being more intuitive, it was more usable by non-experts, and the books of similar topics being grouped together has allowed for better seating arrangements in libraries. The fact that readers can discover (or avoid) fictional works by genre has been cited as an advantage.
