= Chandler Unified School District =

School district in Arizona, U.S.

Address
- 1525 West Frye Road Chandler, Arizona, 85224; United States

District information
- Type: Public
- Motto: Dedicated to Excellence
- Grades: Preschool–12
- Superintendent: Frank Narducci
- Budget: $544,489,000
- NCES District ID: 0401870

Students and staff
- Enrollment: 45,749 (2019-2020)
- Faculty: 2,354.92
- Student–teacher ratio: 18.82

Other information
- Website: www.cusd80.com

Chandler Unified School District serves most of the city of Chandler, Arizona, as well as portions of Gilbert and Queen Creek and all of Sun Lakes. The district serves over 43,000 students, making it the 2nd largest school district in Arizona.

Some parts of Chandler, such as those west of Arizona State Route 101 are not part of Chandler Unified School District (these parts are served by Kyrene School District and Tempe Union High School District). Additionally, some parts of Chandler near the Mesa border are served by Mesa Public Schools.

== Number of Schools ==
- 32 elementary schools
- Ten junior high schools
- Eight comprehensive high schools
- Four alternative schools
- Two Gifted Academies (Knox and Weinberg Elementary School)
- Arizona College Prep (a preparatory junior high and high school)
- Five Chandler Traditional Academies (four elementary schools and a junior high school)
- Four hybrid schools (Traditional and Classic on the same campus)

== High schools ==
Name	Basha	Chandler	Hamilton	Perry	Casteel (Note: Casteel High School serves grades 7–12.)	ACP High School
Location	Chandler	Chandler	Chandler	Gilbert	Queen Creek	Chandler
Opened	2002	1914	1998	2007	2015	2012 as ACP-Erie, 2021 as ACP High
Colors	Forest green, gold, black	Royal blue, white	Maroon, black	Cardinal red, navy blue	Navy blue, metallic gold	Purple, black, white/silver
Mascot	Bear	Wolf	Husky	Puma	Colt	Knight
Principal	Marques Rieschl	Michael Franklin Jr.	Mike De La Torre	Heather Patterson	Jay Schnittger	Rob Bickes
Athletic conference	6A	6A	6A	6A	5A	5A
Enrollment (2021–1–26)	2,911	2,882	3,385	3,108	3,064	2,270
