= Hamilton High School (Chandler, Arizona) =

High school in Chandler, Arizona

Location
- 3700 South Arizona Avenue; Chandler, Arizona 85248; United States; 33°15′10″N 111°50′34″W

Information
- Type: Public
- Motto: Dare to Dream
- Established: 1998
- Status: Currently operational
- Locale: Suburb: Large (21)
- School district: Chandler Unified School District
- NCES District ID: 0401870
- CEEB code: 030062
- NCES School ID: 040187001677
- Principal: Domonic Romero
- Faculty: 179.38 (on an FTE basis)
- Grades: 9–12
- Enrollment: 3,675 (2023–2024)
  - Grade 9: 866
  - Grade 10: 930
  - Grade 11: 894
  - Grade 12: 985
- Student to teacher ratio: 21.51
- Colors: Black, maroon and silver
- Athletics conference: 6A
- Mascot: Husky
- Rival: Chandler High School
- Newspaper: The Paw Print
- Yearbook: Notlimah
- Website: hhs.cusd80.com
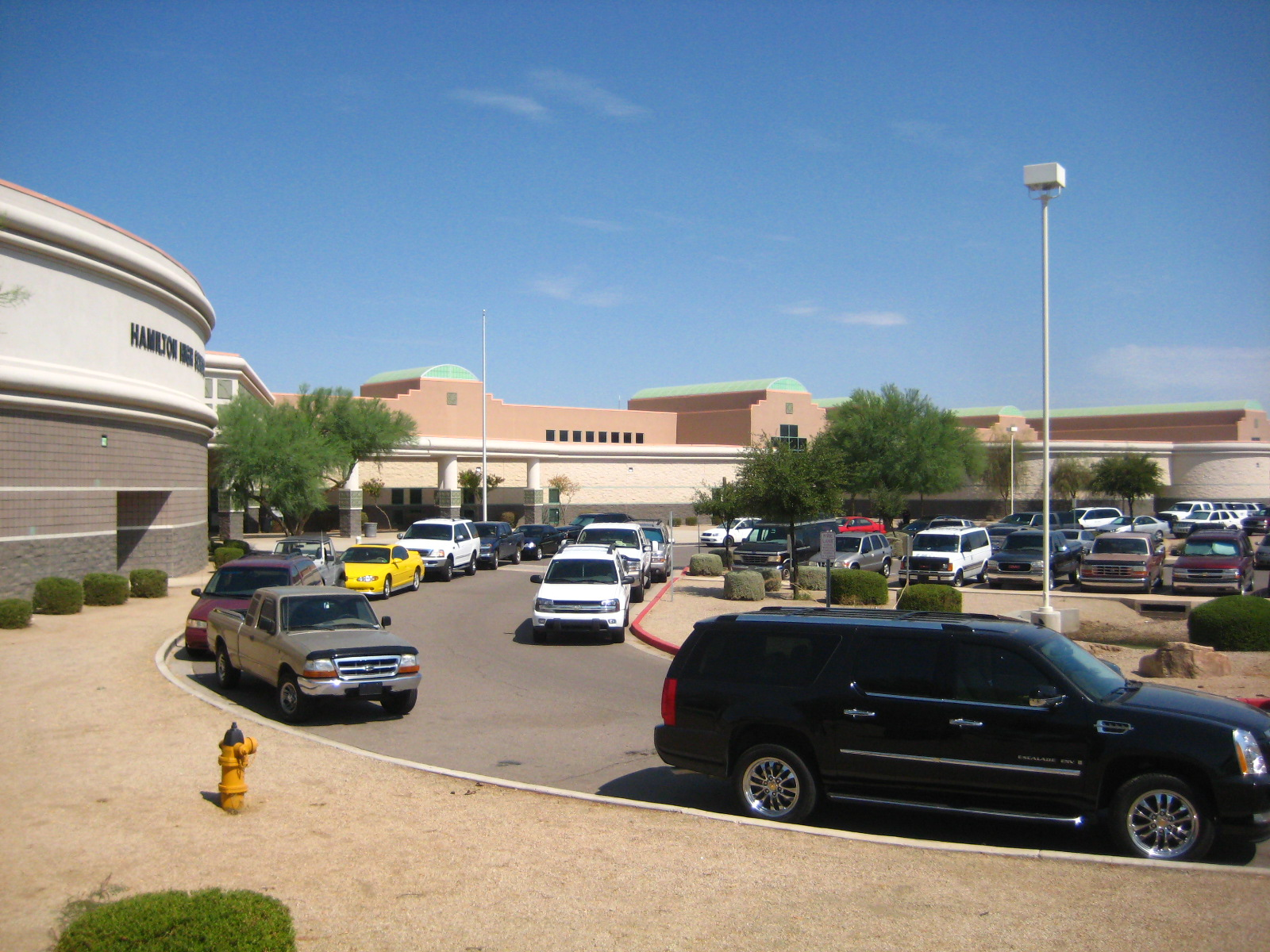
- Hamilton High School

Hamilton High School is a public high school in Chandler, Arizona, United States. It is Arizona's largest high school, with a 4,200 student capacity.

== History ==
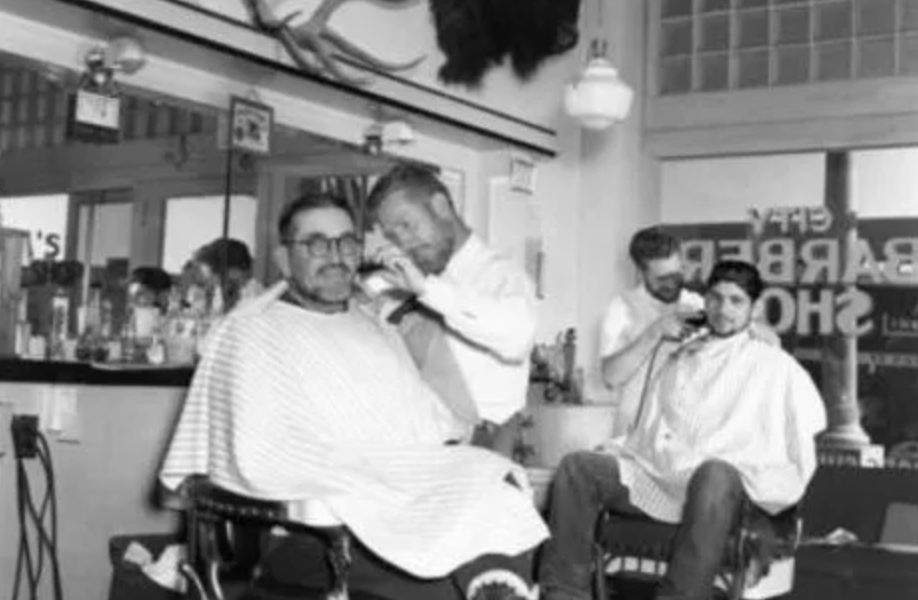
Co-founder of the city of Chandler, John Augustus Hamilton at City Barber Shop 1948

Hamilton's campus resides on land originally owned by the Hamilton family. Family patriarch, John Augustus Hamilton, helped found the city of Chandler serving as the sheriff for all of what is now considered the southeast Phoenix Metropolitan Area. According to the Chandler Museum and the Chandler Historical Society, Jerry Loper Field marks the location of the Hamilton family's general store. During that time period, locals referred to what is currently the Arizona Avenue/SR 87 and Ocotillo Boulevard intersection as "Hamilton's Corner".

As the Chandler area became more populated, Chandler High School was unable to handle the community's increasing educational needs. Voters in 1996 granted Chandler Unified School District (CUSD) a 33 million US$ bond to purchase the 359,341 ft^{2} (3,338.3 m^{2}) property and awarded Stantec the construction contract for the original Hamilton High School campus. The school becoming operational in 1998 with Fred DePrez as principal and 1,600 freshmen through junior level students greatly relieved the pressure on Chandler High School.

== Academics ==
Hamilton's curriculum is aligned with the standards set by the Arizona Department of Education and implements the state's Education and Career Action Plan (ECAP) required for all students grades 9–12 graduating from a publicly funded high school. CUSD high schools also implements an open enrollment policy, meaning students from outside the intended school boundaries may attend without tuition or other penalties.

Arizona requires that all high school students take 6 credit bearing courses during their freshmen through junior years, and provides the option for students on track for graduation the ability to reduce their course load to 4 credit bearing courses. However, CUSD requires all students must complete 22 credits whereas the public university system controlled by the Arizona Board of Regents requires only 16 credits in the following areas:

- English - 4 credits
- Mathematics - 4 credits
- Science - 3 credits
- Social Studies - 3 credits
- Career and Technical Educator/Fine Arts - 1 credit
- Physical Education - 1 credit
- Comprehensive Health - 1/2 credits
- Elective Courses - 5 1/2 credits

=== Cross-credit courses ===
At Hamilton and all CUSD high school students may swap two semesters (1/2 credits per semester) of Spiritline, Beginning through Advance Dance, Drill Team, Color Guard, Marching Band, Winter guard, or AFJROTC essentially waiving the required one Physical Education credit required for graduation.

Students which choose applied sciences in areas such as Applied Biology or Applied Agricultural Sciences gain equivalent Science credits. Likewise, Economics credits can be awarded like Agricultural Business Management, Business, Business Applications, Marketing, Economics Applications, Family and Consumer Sciences, and vocational courses.

Community college credits can be awarded through a partnership with Chandler-Gilbert Community College (CGCC) and cooperative credits for vocational courses are provided by East Valley Institute of Technology (EVIT). Students must be dually enrolled for the Arizona community college or the Arizona public university system to accept the credits towards a degree. CUSD Transportation Department provides routes between Hamilton, EVIT, and CGCC with after school hours transportation intended for students participating in activities.

Separate from EVIT and CGCC, the University of Arizona implemented a pilot program to get university credits for students pursuing introductory engineering courses starting in 2014.

=== Accolades ===
The Arizona Education Foundation awarded its A+ School of Excellence award to Hamilton in 2005, 2009, and 2013. In 2014 it was the 15th highest scoring school on Arizona's Instrument to Measure Standards (AIMS) tests and the top non-magnet school participating in the annual public school examination. The Presidential Excellence Award in Mathematics and Science was presented to Deborah Nipar in 2019 for her work as an AP Chemistry and Honors Science Research instructor, one of five recipients from Arizona.

Students have achieved many honors including: National Merit Honors, Western Governors Association's annual Spirit Award, honorable mentions for the Governor's Celebration of Innovation Award, and ASU Gammage High School Musical Theatre Awards.

=== Statistics ===
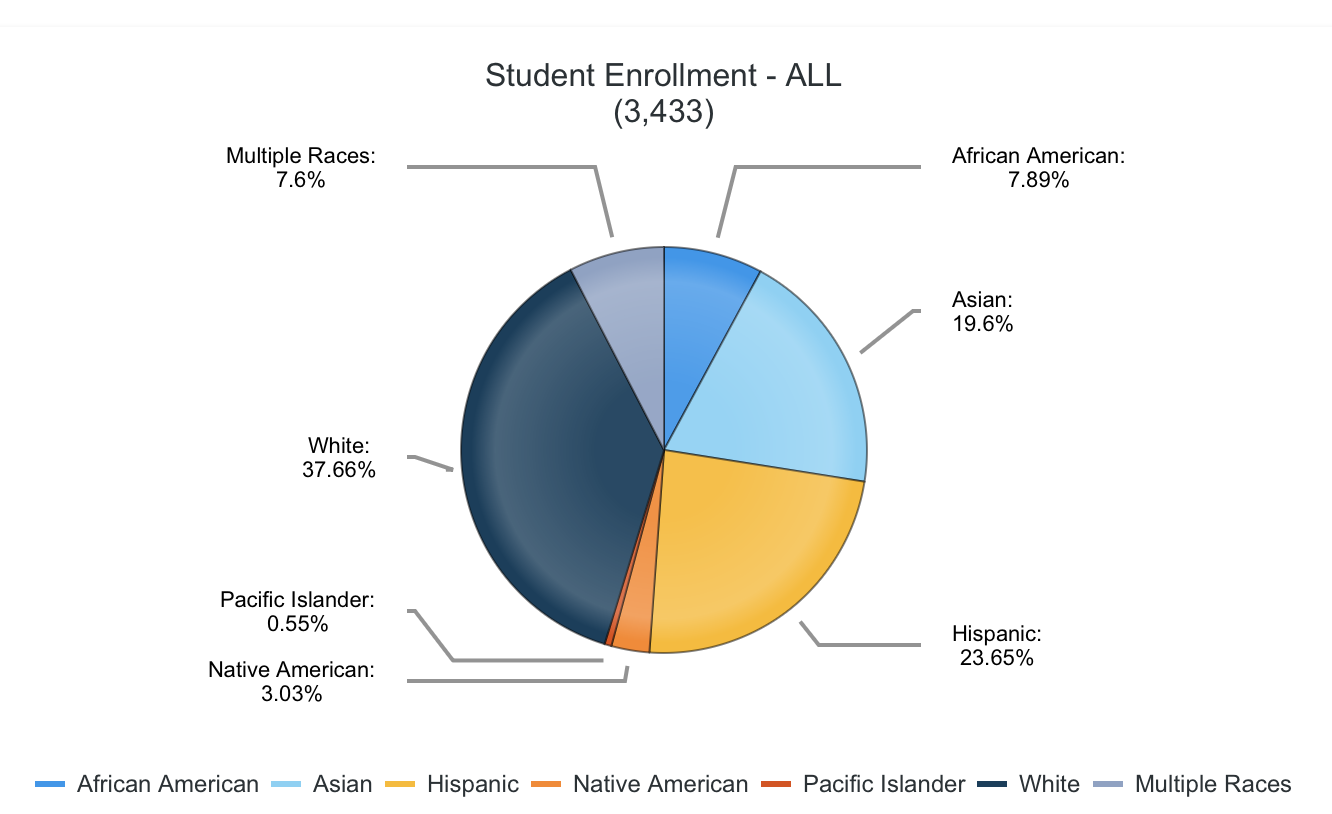
Demographics of Hamilton High School

US News reports in 2019 a 95% graduation rate, 51% reading proficiency, 51% mathematics proficiency, 35% passed an AP examination, and 44% attempting an AP examination with an overall rating is 90.78/100. According to the report Hamilton ranked 15th in the Phoenix Metropolitan Area, 23rd in the state of Arizona, and 1,590th nationally. Starting in 2019's Arizona Measurement for Educational Readiness to Inform Teachers (AzMERIT), which replaced the Arizona's Instrument to Measure Standards (AIMS) testing, indicating students were 88.6% prepared.

The same report says 22% are free lunch program participants, 3% are reduce-price lunch program, and 25% meet the qualifications of being economically disadvantaged.

=== Other events ===
Hamilton hosted the Breaking Barriers for Excellence Equity Symposium 2019 for improving student teacher relationships.

The non-denominational Phoenix Church of Christ holds events on Wednesday nights and Sunday in the auditorium.

Hamilton has also hosted multiple Arizona Marching Band Association (AzMBA) and Arizona Band and Orchestra Directors Association (ABODA) events. This includes the 2019 ABODA Division II & IV Marching Band Semifinals, 2021 ABODA Division I & III Marching Band Semifinals, and the 2023 AzMBA Division 2A & 5A Championships. They are slated to hold the 2024 AzMBA Division 3A & 4A Championships as well.

== Athletics ==
Hamilton is an Arizona Interscholastic Association (AIA) member school offering boys and girls sports adhering to Chandler Unified School District (CUSD) Title IX compliance. Student athletes can participate in varsity, junior varsity, and freshmen only teams as well as individual sports under the AIA's 6A Conference. Hamilton Athletics consist of these sports:

- Badminton (Girls)‡
- Baseball
- Basketball (Boys and Girls)
- Beach Volleyball (Boys and Girls)‡
- Cheer (Girls and Coed)
- Cross Country (Boys and Girls)†
- Flag football
- Football
- Golf (Boys and Girls)†
- Hockey
- Lacrosse (Boys and Girls)
- Pomline
- Soccer (Boys and Girls)
- Softball
- Swim and Dive (Boys and Girls)†
- Tennis (Boys and Girls)‡
- Track and field (Boys and Girls)†
- Volleyball (Boys and Girls)‡
- Wrestling (Boys and Girls)
- † denotes individual and team sports
- ‡ denotes individual, doubles, and team sports

Each sport is funded by the school, yet additional funds are raised through boosters creating 501(c)(3) non-profit organization, donations, and tax credits.

=== Badminton ===
Coach	Seasons	W	L	T	Pct.	National Title	State Title	Runners-up	Region Title	Notes
Lauren Rosales	2011-	141	65	0	0.684	0	3	2		
Total		141	65	0	.684	0	9	13		

=== Baseball ===
Coach	Seasons	W	L	T	Pct.	National Title	State Title	Runners-up	Region Title	Notes
Mike Woods	1997-	579	209	1	.749	1	9	13	10	Current head coach
Total	23	579	209	1	.749	1	9	13	10	AIA Baseball Championship Records

Since Hamilton started play, the team has amassed 7 Arizona State Championships in its first 20 years placing the school third behind St. David (12) and Scottsdale Chaparral (10) since 1985. In 2020, the team climbed from a preseason ranking of #4 to #1 in the nation by MaxPreps' Xcellent 25 poll with an 8–0 record prior to the closing of all public schools and sports programs indefinitely because of the COVID-19 pandemic, becoming the de facto National Champions that year.

The program has produced 32 Major League Baseball Draftees most notably the 2019 National League Most Valuable Player Cody Bellinger. While coach Mike Woods was a 2025 inductee into the National High School Baseball Coaches Association Hall of Fame.

=== Basketball ===
Coach	Seasons	W	L	T	Pct.	State Title	Runners-up	Open Division Title^{†}	Open Division Runners-up^{†}	Open Division Semifinals^{†}	Open Division Birth^{†}	Region Title	Notes
Nicole Harrison	1998–2000	17	24	0	.415	0	0	-	-	-	-	4	
Tim Rutt	2000–04	28	44	0	.389	0	0	-	-	-	-	7	
Ed Dawson	2004–07	35	45	0	.438	0	0	-	-	-	-	0	
Jeff Kain	2007–15	276	67	0	.805	0	1	-	-	-	-	0	
Trevor Neider	2015–	98	22	0	.817	2	2	0	0	0	3	11	AIA Girls Basketball Championship Records
Total	22	261	111	0	.702	2	3	0	0	0	0	11	
† denotes the inception starting during the 2022–23 season by the AIA.													

=== Flag football ===
Coach	Seasons	W	L	T	Pct.	National Champions	State Title	Runners-up	Region Title	Notes
Matt Stone	2023-	50	3	0	0.932	1	2	0	2	
Total	3	46	3	0	0.943	1	2	0	2	

Hamilton coach Matt Stone staunchly lobbied the AIA for over 10 years and developing enthusiasm for the sport. In 2024, the AIA officially sanctioned the sport for all schools.

The team was instantly successful and reached 2003 Arizona's Big School State Championship in the inaugural year of being a sanctioned sport but lost to Mountain View 20–16. Then Hamilton would complete back to back undefeated seasons and 2 State Championships. During this time period players would receive many region, division, state, and national awards.

In October 2025, USA Today ranked Hamilton No. 1 in their national ranking just 4 regular season games into the season before successfully defeating many national powerhouses.

=== Football ===
Football is the largest athletic program at Hamilton consisting of hundreds of students, 35 paid coaches, and additional volunteer coaches. A 501(c)(3) non-profit organization was established called the Hamilton Gridiron Club contributing additional funds along with the program. Between the Hamilton Gridiron Club and ticket sales, Hamilton football is a financially self-sustaining program.

Coach	Seasons	W	L	T	Pct.	State Title	Runners-up	Open Division Title^{†}	Open Division Runners-up^{†}	Open Division Semifinals^{†}	Open Division Birth^{†}	Region Title	Notes
John Wrenn	1997–2005	91	11	0	.892	2	2	-	-	-	-	4	
Steve Belles	2006–17	131	18	0	.879	5	3	-	-	-	-	7	Record 53-game win streak
Dick Baniszewski	2017	8	4	0	.666	0	0	-	-	-		0	Named interim head coach
Mike Zdebski	2018–23	39	17	0	.698	0	1	0	0	1	4	0	
Travis Dixon	2024-	21	3	0	.875	0	0	0	0	1	1	1	
Total	23	290	53	0	.845	7	8	0	0	1	4	12	AIA Football Championship Records
† denotes the inception starting during the 2022–23 season by the AIA.

==== History ====
John Wrenn was the first employee hired from Homewood-Flossmoor High School in Flossmoor, Illinois and began building a staff consisting of local coaches and professional players for the program. Hamilton began competing in 1998 in the 5A conference as a freelance team and despite their 7–2 record, they were not able to compete in the state championship playoffs. The following year, the AIA placed Hamilton into the Fiesta Region the following year where the team earned most of their region titles.

Hamilton's immediate success resulted in a 2001 5A State Championship appearance falling to Red Mountain High School, 13-10. They would break through beating Mountain View High School in 2003. This set off 15 years of dominance winning 7 Big School State Championships, appearing in an additional 8 championship games and clinching 11 region titles. During this time period, Hamilton football has been ranked nationally several times peaking at #4 nationally by USA Today's Super25 poll when the state record 53-game win streak was broken in November 2011 by Desert Vista High School.

==== National and international play ====
The team has also traveled nationally and internationally playing some of the best teams. Starting in September 2006, Hamilton traveled to Massillon, OH to play Washington High School for the McDonald's Kirk Herbstreit Football Challenge losing 35–26. The first nation victory came in 2008 team playing Miami, Florida's Booker T. Washington High School, a 37–19 win.

The 2012 season featured an invitation from the Global Ireland Football Tournament setup by University of Notre Dame and the US Navy Academy. The tournament placed Hamilton against perennial powerhouse Notre Dame High School traveled from Sherman Oaks, CA defeating Hamilton 27–15 at Parnell Park, in Dublin.

During the first 20 years of the varsity football playing against non-Arizona team, Hamilton has amassed a 5–5 record overall.

==== Hazing case ====
In 2017, an investigation into alleged hazing by members of the Hamilton football team became public. The investigation alleges several incidences starting in September 2015 that included sexual assault, assault, aggravated assault, molestation, kidnapping, and child abuse. Ultimately three students were charged, two as minors and one as an adult. CUSD officials reassigned the varsity football coach Steve Belles, the athletic director, and the principal to the district offices indefinitely in September 2017. Investigators recommended child abuse and failure to report child abuse charges as the case became convoluted with alleged video and audio evidence of witness tampering and victim intimidation. Maricopa County Attorney General Bill Montgomery later announce his office would not be seeking charges against the three administrators however none returned to Hamilton. Families of five alleged victims filed civil lawsuits against CUSD and the Hamilton administrators settling in 2019 for an undisclosed amount. Before the 2018 season, CUSD relieved interim head coach Dick Baniszewski by hiring of Mike Zbedski varsity head coach marking the end of Belles' tenure. Belles left CUSD at the end of the school year for Juan Diego Catholic High School in Draper, Utah as a position coach.

After 3 years of criminal proceedings, the sole student charged as an adult accepted a plea deal in February 2020 for a single misdemeanor charge of aggravated assault where the sentence was credited as time served.

=== Golf ===
==== Boys ====
The boys team has won the 2011 and 2019 National Championship at the Antigua National High School Golf Invitational. They have also won 5 consecutive championships for a total of 7 championships in AIA's Boys Team Golf State Championships.

Arizona State Championship: 2005, 2006, 2007, 2008, 2009, 2014, and 2019

==== Girls ====
The girls team won the AIA's Girls Team Golf State Championship in 2010 and 2022

Arizona State Champions: 2010

=== Hockey ===
Hamilton Hockey program is not under the direction of the AIA; rather, the Arizona High School Hockey Association. They compete in Division I and III.

=== Soccer ===
==== Boys ====
Coach	Seasons	W	L	T	Pct.	State Title	Runners-up	Region Title	Notes
Markette	9	103	37	6	.705	1	3		
Jackson	2	37	7	5	.755	1	0		
Markette	1	8	8	4	.400	0	0		
Thompson	2	23	4	0	.851	0	1		
Total	14	171	56	15	.701	2	3		AIA Boys Soccer Championship Records

==== Girls ====
Coach	Seasons	W	L	T	Pct.	State Title	Runners-up	Region Title	Notes
Thompson	18	194	76	27	.851	1	3		
Total	18	194	76	27	.701	1	3		AIA Girls Soccer Championship Records

=== Softball ===
Coach	Seasons	W	L	T	Pct.	State Title	Runners-up	Region Title	Notes
M. Weiner	2007–09	31	47	0	.397	0			
K. Householder	2010	24	11	0	.686	0			
C. Collins	2011	13	17	0	.433	0			
R. Parra	2012–	191	85	0	.692	2			
Total	22	259	145	0	.641	2			AIA Softball Championship Records

=== Volleyball ===
In Arizona, the AIA schedules the Boys Team to play during the fall semester while the Girls Team play during the spring.

==== Boys ====
Coach	Seasons	W	L	T	Pct.	State Title	Runners-up	Region Title	Notes
Jeff Bader	2008-16	214	82	5	.711	1	3		
Katie Higgins	2017	9	20	3	.391	0	0		
Tau Bader	2018-19	26	36	3	.400	0	0		
Jeff Badder	2020	6	1	0	.857	0	0		
Nick Regester	2021-	7	11	0	.389	0	0		
Total	22	262	150	11	.619	1	3		AIA Boys Volleyball Records

==== Girls ====
Coach	Seasons	W	L	T	Pct.	State Title	Runners-up	Region Title	Notes
Sharon Vanis	2007-	102	47	0	.685	2	3		
Total		102	47	0	.685	2	3		AIA Girls Volleyball Records

=== Rivalry ===
A high-profile rivalry developed between Chandler High School and Hamilton High School which are separated by 4 miles (6.4 km) along Arizona Avenue/SR 87. Local media has since daubed this high-profile competition as the "Battle of Arizona Avenue". The annual matchup is consistently a High School Bowl Series game which has been instrumental in broadcast the game nationally by ESPN, ESPNU, and the NFHS Network. College coaches frequent the sidelines because of the wealth of highly rated players. Spectator turnout can exceeded 10,000 with NFL players and other high profile individuals.

The most notable addition was the Chandler Rotary Club introducing a trophy where brass plate are inscribed with the victors name and date with a custom street sign labeled "Arizona Ave Champions" affixed on top. A luncheon is also hosted by the Rotary Club inviting school staff, administrators, current and former players, and inductees to the Chandler Sports Hall of Fame.

== Activities ==
The AIA regulates and supports other activities which do not fall under sports. Hamilton activities consist of the following activities:

- Chess
- Esports
- JROTC
- VEX Robotics
- Speech and Debate

== Other extracurricular activities ==
While Hamilton Athletics is a completely voluntary, the Marching Band and Robotics programs can garner academic credits if the student opts into taking them as elective credits.

=== Academic Decathlon ===
The Academic Decathlon has accumulated numerous team and individual awards including Division IV Arizona State Championship and region titles during the 2018–19 and 2019–20 seasons. The team won an Arizona State Championship Runners Up trophy during the 2017–18 season. During the 2018–19 season, they would compete at The United States Academic Decathlon Nationals against 73 schools from the United States, China, and the United Kingdom placing 4th overall in Division IV and 3rd in the Academic Decathlon's Super Quiz competition.

=== Acting ===
Hamilton has performed in New York City giving their rendition of Little Women. Standout Sophia Donnell, was awarded a Jimmy Award as a part of the National High School Musical Theatre Awards.

=== Marching Band ===
The Marching Huskies joined the Arizona Marching Band Association (AzMBA) in 2018 allowing them to compete. Unlike divisions based on a school's student attendance, AzMBA creates divisions based on the number of students performing. This allowed them to secure their first 2A State Championship in 2023.

=== Robotics ===
Hamilton High School Robotics Team, known as the "Microbots" and registered as "Team 698", has built award-winning robots for the FIRST Robotics Competition. In its inaugural year of 2001, the team won a Regional Award at the Southern California Competitions. The Arizona Regionals selected the team for Judges' Award in 2003 with the Industrial Safety Award and the Entrepreneurship Award in 2014. The 2017 Arizona West Regional would award a FIRST Dean's List Finalist Award. Several technology companies within the city of Chandler sponsor and mentor the students during all phases of the competitions.

== Campus ==
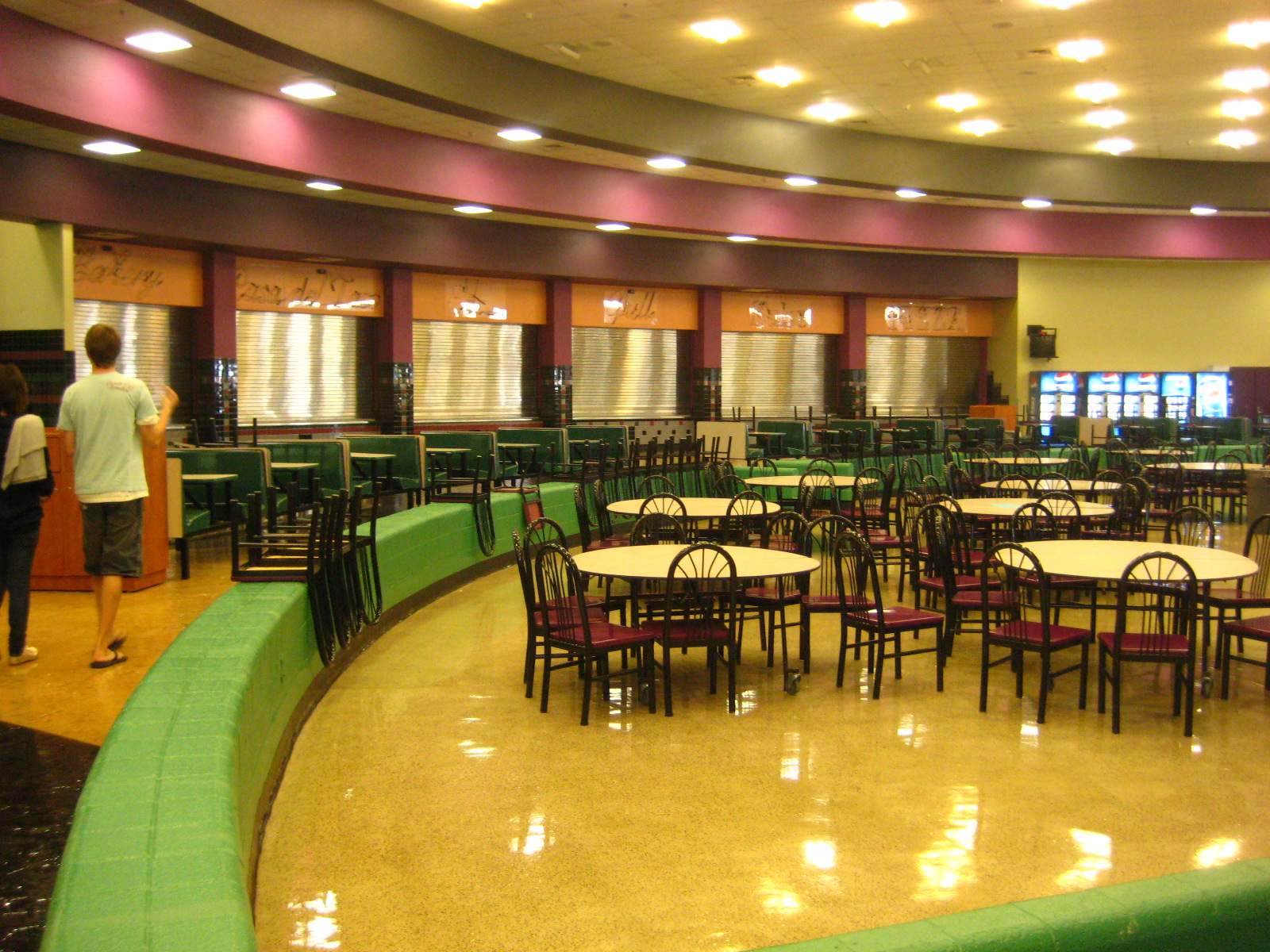
The indoor section of the original Hamilton cafeteria

Hamilton was constructed by Stantec on a $33 million USD bond issued to CUSD on a 359,341 ft^{2} (3,338.3 m^{2}) property on the northwest corner of Arizona Avenue/SR 87 and Ocotillo Boulevard. The main building is two stories tall with an administrative wing (A-wing) on the bottom floor next to the main entrance. Students have the option of eating indoors or in a shaded patio. Food services are located along the south end of the indoor eating area with supporting facilities directly behind them (B-wing) offering students 6 styles of food. In August 2023, construction began on an expansion due to over crowding. The expansion took the original cafeteria's outdoor seating area and the demolition of a non-utilized Greenhouse on the west side essentially doubling the capacity.

The traditional classrooms are found in three 2-story wings (C-wing, D-wing, and E-wing) in a square formation with classrooms on both sides of the hallways and one independent staircase located in a rear corner per wing. The main corridor has two staircases and an elevator for disabled or injured students.

Within D-wing's ground floor has a child care service called Lil' Express Learning Center open to faculty and students implementing the Arizona Department of Educations Early Childhood Education program. The Learning Center also has a walled off and covered playground on the north end of the campus. Also on the ground floor is the special education classrooms for developmentally challenged students with licensed speech, occupational, and physical therapists adhering to Title I.

All of the performing arts like concert band, jazz band, choir, orchestra, gymnastics, dance, and art are located on the southeast portion of the main building (H-wing) surrounding the 600-seat auditorium. Locker rooms and a small weight lifting room surround the gym (G-Wing). In the northern parking lot and near the N Wing are mobile classrooms (M-Wing) with 2 classrooms per building due to the large student population.

CUSD was granted a $192 million USD bond in November 2015 for district wide construction and updates. Hamilton was allocated $4.5 million for a two-story building (N-wing) with 20 classroom and additional administration offices 27,530 ft^{2} (2,557.6 m^{2}) located on what was the original outdoor concrete basketball courts.

=== Sports facilities ===
The largest sports facility on the Hamilton property is Jerry Loper Field which host all football, soccer, track and field, and other events. The field's namesake is for the late Chandler High School football coach Jerry Loper who was killed by an impaired driver in 1996. Stands are available on the east and west side of the field with an initial capacity of 6,000 fans, however CUSD has installed temporary stands for high-profile events like the "Battle of Arizona Ave". Within Jerry Loper Field are two field houses, the first was built during the initial construction of the school and the second is a $2.3 million USD 9,585 ft^{2} (890.5 m^{2}) weightlifting facility for student athletics completed 2019. Initially a natural grass field a 2023 CUSD Board of Directors decision allocated $2.9 million USD converting all of their high school stadium fields to an artificial turf. No changes have been made to the original concession stands, restrooms, and ticket facilities.

Dale Hancock Gymnasium inside the school is capable of seating 3,000 fans with collapsible stands on either side of the main basketball court which is sunk a few feet lower. The namesake is for the late CUSD Board of Education member Dale Hancock in 2011. The gymnasium houses several events including basketball, volleyball, badminton, pep-rallies, the Hamilton Invitational Science and Engineering Fair (HISEF), and other events.

The original campus layout included Hamilton Bus Yard, run by CUSD's Transportation Department. In 2005, it was closed and replaced with new asphalt providing a practice area for the Hamilton Marching Band during the fall season and serves as an auxiliary parking for large events. The remaining original sports facilities are 4 baseball diamonds, 3 softball diamonds, 2 practice football fields, 10 tennis courts, and batting cages with auxiliary facilities like bathrooms and ticket sales buildings. The COVID-19 pandemic resulted in CUSD closing ticket sales buildings district wide therefore all tickets are sold digitally using QR code contracted online vendor.

=== Public facilities ===
Since Hamilton is a public school all facilities can be rented by the public for events through the CUSD Superintendent's office complying with A.R.S. § 15-1105(A).

==== Public library ====
Along the northeast corner of the campus is a branch of the Chandler Public Library operated and funded by the City of Chandler. There are doors that allow people direct access to the library from inside the school, however doors with automatic locking prevent people from accessing the school through the library.

There are no classes or dedicated quiet spaces but the library does offer computers, faxing, printing, scanning and Wi-Fi access free of charge. Meeting rooms exist however they must be reserved in advance for a fee.

==== Aquatic Center ====
The Hamilton Aquatic Center is an open air multipurpose community pool opened to the public during the spring and summer months. It does serve as the home of Hamilton's Swim and Dive team featuring a regulation lap pool and moveable stands for fans.

== Charity ==
During a November 2005 football practice wide receiver Joe Jackson was involved in a helmet-to-helmet hit rendering him paralyzed from the waist down. As a result, the Hamilton athletic community started a fund to pay for the immediate medical bills. A 501(c)(3) non-profit organization was established on October 26, 2006, called the Joe Jackson Foundation (JJF) which provides children with athletics, recreational, medical, and academic opportunities suffering from Spinal Cord Injuries. Hamilton's football Gridiron Club remain a supporter of JJF by participating in fundraisers and other capacities.

== Notable people ==
=== Faculty ===
- Steve Belles - NFL/ AFL Quarterback - Former Varsity Head Football Coach
- Sean Bubin - NFL/CFL/NFLE Offensive Linemen - Junior Varsity Offensive Line Football Coach
- Darryl Clack - NFL/CFL Running Back - Junior Varsity Running Backs Football Coach
- Rick Cunningham - NFL/CFL Offensive Tackle - Freshmen Offensive Line Football Coach
- Johnny Johnson - NFL Running Back - Junior Varsity Defensive Backs Football Coach
- Kenny King - NFL Defensive Linemen - Former Freshmen Head Coach and Defensive Line/Wight Lifting Football Coach
- Anthony Parker - NFL Cornerback - Varsity Cornerbacks Football Coach
- Lindsay Taylor - WNBA/TKBL/LFB/WKBL Center - Varsity Assistant Girls Basketball Coach
- Mark Tucker - NFL Lineman/AFL Arizona Rattler Coach - Varsity Defensive Line Football Coach
- Bob Wylie - NFL Defensive Coordinator - Former Varsity Defensive Coordinator Football Coach

=== Alumni ===
==== Athletes ====
===== Baseball =====
- Cody Bellinger - MLB - player with the New York Yankees
- Roch Cholowsky - MLB - Picked No. 1 overall in 2026 Draft by the Chicago White Sox
- Eric Farris - MLB - former player with the Milwaukee Brewers
- Dominic Hamel - player with the New York Mets
- Patrick Murphy - MLB - player with the Texas Rangers and Toronto Blue Jays
- Mitch Nay - MiLB - player drafted by the Toronto Blue Jays and plays for the Chattanooga Lookouts
- Jake Wong - MLB - player with the Cincinnati Reds

===== Football =====
- Zach Bauman - NFL/CFL - player with the Arizona Cardinals and Edmonton Eskimos
- Tyler Johnstone - NFL/CFL - player with the Los Angeles Chargers and Montreal Alouettes
- Jawhar Jordan - NFL - for the Houston Texans
- Glenn Love - CFL - player with the BC Lions, Calgary Stampeders, Saskatchewan Roughriders, and Montreal Alouettes
- Cole Luke - NFL - player with the Carolina Panthers and Washington Football Team
- Nicco Marchiol - NCAA - player with the Northwestern Wildcats
- Alex McLaughlin - NCAA - player with the Washington Huskies
- Dontay Moch - NFL/CFL - player with the Cincinnati Bengals, Arizona Cardinals, Tennessee Titans, and Toronto Argonauts
- Brenden Rice – NFL - player with the Los Angeles Chargers
- Gerell Robinson - NFL - former player with the Cleveland Browns
- Tyler Shough - NFL - quarterback with the New Orleans Saints
- Terrell Suggs - NFL - player with the Baltimore Ravens, Arizona Cardinals, and Kansas City Chiefs
- Kerry Taylor - NFL - former player with the Arizona Cardinals and Jacksonville Jaguars
- Christian Westerman - NFL - player with the Cincinnati Bengals
- Javin Wright - NFL - player with the Tampa Bay Buccaneers

===== Golf =====
- Chan Kim - PGA - player in the Canadian Golf Tour and Japan Golf Tour
- Richard T. Lee - PGA/KPGA - player with the Nationwide Tour and Asian Tour
- Hannah O'Sullivan - 2015 U.S. Women's Amateur Golf champion
- Andrew Yun - PGA Tour player

===== Other sports =====
- Tony Cascio - MLS - player with the Arizona United
- Ashley Holland - NFL/NBA - Dallas Cowboy Cheerleader, and Suns Dance Team
- Eric Jacobsen - B.League - player Ibaraki Robots
- Camden Pulkinen - Figure Skater - competed for Team USA in the Olympics as well as individually at the US National Champion and World Record Holder
- Samaya Taylor-Jenkins - Olympics - Wide receiver on the Flag Football US Team.

==== Others ====
- Krystina Alabado - Actress - Broadway production of American Psycho
- Kylee Saunders - Entertainer - J-Pop star
- Isabel Ticlo - Model - Miss Arizona
- Viputheshwar Sitaraman - Entrepreneur - CEO and Founder of Explica, Inc.
