= Book Industry Study Group =

American trade association

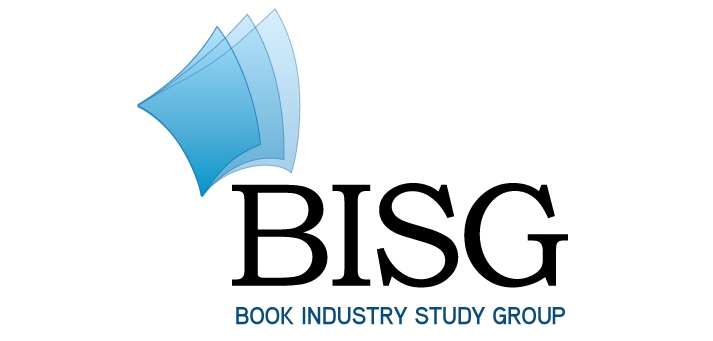

The Book Industry Study Group, Inc. (BISG) is an American trade association for policy, technical standards, and research related to books in all formats (print, digital, audio, etc.). The mission of BISG is to create a more informed, empowered, and efficient book industry. It represents all segments of the book industry, including publishers, manufacturers, suppliers, wholesalers, retailers, distributors, librarians, agents, and students. BISG focuses on solutions for books and not journals.

== History ==
The Book Industry Study Group, Inc. (BISG) began at the annual conference of the Book Manufacturers Institute in November 1975. Here, a few publishers and manufacturers met informally with representatives of several trade associations to discuss the urgent need to improve the industry's research capability. Once begun, this small group invited others to join in sponsoring a seminal study of book industry information needs on which a future program could be based. BISG was incorporated as a not-for-profit corporation in February 1976 and its Report on Book Industry Information Needs was completed and published in April 1976. The report confirmed the feasibility of a program of major research studies by and about the industry.

As an organization, BISG is concerned with the publishing industry as a whole; its membership consists of companies from all sectors of the industry. Trade and professional associations such as the Association of American Publishers (AAP), the American Booksellers Association (ABA), the Independent Book Publishers Association (IBPA), the American Library Association (ALA), and the Evangelical Christian Publishers Association (ECPA) are longstanding members of BISG.

Over the years BISG has published many research reports in response to the needs of its members. Among these are studies of paper availability, book distribution, elementary/high school adoptions, printing capacity cycles, book sales through non-traditional book markets, consumer book buying habits and an informational guide to the top 50 relevant corporate and community sponsored education programs. In conjunction with other organizations, BISG has produced reports on African-American book buyers, small and independent book publishers, and the state of used book sales in the U.S.

Through BISAC (Book Industry Standards and Communications), BISG has been involved with technological advances such as bar codes and electronic business communications formats. It developed the BISAC Subject Headings, which are a mainstay in the industry and are required for participation in many databases. BISAC Subject Headings are also making inroads into library classification.

Brian O'Leary began his tenure as executive director of BISG on October 3, 2016. Prior executive directors include Mark Kuyper, Len Vlahos, Scott Lubeck, and Sally Dedecker.

In 2020, the Green Book Alliance was formed as a partnership between BISG in the U.S., BookNet Canada, and Book Industry Communication (BIC) in the United Kingdom and led by Brian O'Leary (BISG), Noah Genner (BookNet Canada), and Karina Uruquhart (BIC). These three associations for the book publishing supply chain have formed the consortium in order to address the impact of the industry on the environment.

== Committees ==
A range of committees and working groups provide BISG members with an ongoing platform for the identification, assessment, and resolution of book industry issues, at times through the development of standards and best practices. These committees and working groups are actively managed by BISG members and generally meet on a monthly basis.

BISG Committees: Metadata Committee, Rights Committee, Subject Codes Committee, Supply Chain Committee, Workflow Committee

BISG Working Groups: Accessibility, AI, Audiobook Best Practices, BISAC to Thema Mapping, Book Publishing Next, Metadata Best Practices, Sustainability

== See also ==
- Books in the United States
