= Maricopa County Library District =

Public library system located in central Arizona

Coordinates: 33°30′50″N 112°28′33″W

- Location: 20304 W White Tank Mountain Rd, Waddell AZ, 85355, United States
- Type: Public
- Established: 1929
- Branches: 14

Collection
- Size: 20,870,731

Access and use
- Circulation: 7,799,629

Other information
- Director: Jeremy Reeder
- Website: mcldaz.org

The Maricopa County Library District is a public library system located in central Arizona, United States. It is the largest library system in the US by population served.

The library district serves unincorporated areas in Maricopa County, Arizona. In addition, the district partners with cities/towns and school districts to operate their libraries. The district operates 14 libraries. Each year, the Library District welcomes up to three million visitors and holds thousands of free events and programs for all ages. More than 60 libraries from across the county participate in Maricopa County Reads, the award-winning Summer Reading Program created and hosted by MCLD. In 2020, the Library District held nearly 6,000 events, including 700 online events, and circulated 7.5 million physical and digital checkouts. For Maricopa County and Town of Queen Creek residents and property owners, a library card is free.

== Branches ==
- Aguila Library, Aguila
- Ed Robson Library, Sun Lakes
- El Mirage Library, El Mirage
- Fairway Library, Sun City
- Fountain Hills Library, Fountain Hills
- Georgia T. Lord Library, Goodyear
- Guadalupe Library, Guadalupe
- Litchfield Park Library, Litchfield Park
- North Valley Regional Library, Anthem (co-located with Boulder Creek High School)
- Perry Library, Gilbert (co-located with Perry High School)
- Queen Creek Library, Queen Creek
- Southeast Regional Library, Gilbert
- Sun City Library, Sun City
- White Tank Library, Waddell

== Collections and services ==
Maricopa County Library District is a popular materials system, meaning it does not contain academic or reference materials but offers audiobooks, children's books, and a collection of Blu-ray and DVDs.

All libraries utilize the District's homegrown ShelfLogic classification system (formerly referred to as Dewey-less), which means they do not use the Dewey Decimal Classification format to file books. Instead, these libraries are set up with books and media located in "neighborhoods" by topic, like a modern bookstore.

The Maricopa County Library District also operates a virtual branch and a Books by Mail program that delivers large print materials through the U.S. Postal Service to people unable to come to the library.

The Maricopa County Library District has eMedia to provide downloads and streaming to desktops and mobile devices. The eMedia available include eBooks, audiobooks, magazines, TV & movies, and music. Customers also have access to Consumer Reports (website) and a series of research databases for homework and college prep, genealogy services, health information and more.

In addition, MCLD offers telescopes, citizen science kits, ukuleles, Chromebooks, book club boxes, culture passes, and a seed library available to guests.

== History ==
Maricopa County started a free library system the day after the stock market crash in 1929. The enormous population increases in the 1960s and 1970s led the County Library System to undergo reorganization to meet the demands of the residents. In 1986 the State Legislature passed a bill allowing Arizona counties to establish library districts. In 1987 the County Board of Supervisors voted to form the Maricopa County Library District (separate governmental and tax entities). The County Board of Supervisors serves as the District's Board of Library Directors.

In 2007, the Maricopa County Library District opened Perry Library, which abandoned the traditional Dewey Decimal System in favor of categorical shelving (i.e., Shelf Logic). Their Sun City Library moved to Shelf Logic in 2009 as did its Gila Bend (2012) North Valley Regional and El Mirage Libraries in 2013.

During fiscal year 2007–08, the library district welcomed more than 3 million customers and loaned more than 5 million units of materials.

In November 2008, the Queen Creek Branch Library opened a new 27,000-square-foot (2,500 m^{2}) building, expandable to 47,000 square feet (4,400 m^{2}).

In March 2009, the Goodyear Branch Library opened in temporary quarters in the Goodyear City Hall.

In May 2009, the Library District took over the once privately held Sun City Bell Branch Library and renamed it the Sun City Branch Library.

In 2014, the Library District began offering digital content to its customers.

The Maricopa County Board of Supervisors voted to eliminate overdue fines at County Libraries on May 22, 2019.

In 2022, the Library District relocated the Goodyear Branch Library to a two-story building in the newly constructed Goodyear Civic Square, renaming the location after former Goodyear mayor Georgia Lord.

In 2023, the Maricopa Country Library District went from 18 to 15 branches when they turned over the operation of three Surprise area branches to the city of Surprise, Arizona and their newly created Arts, Culture and Library Department. The impacted branches were the Asante Library, Hollyhock Library and Surprise Regional Library.

In 2025, the Maricopa County Library District went from 15 to 14 branches when the Gila Bend Unified School District unilaterally decided to end its partnership with the Library District and permanently shut down the Gila Bend branch.

== Awards and recognition ==
The Library District has received national awards for its programs and technology. In 2005 MCLD was awarded the John Cotton Dana Library Public Relations Award for The Mystery Club of Luna Drive, an original online serial novel.

The library district was awarded the Pioneer Award for Quality by The Arizona Quality Alliance in 2006.

In 2006 the district turned the book Tomás and the Library Lady by Pat Mora into a world premiere stage play adapted and performed by a professional children's theater company that toured schools and reached over 70,000 children. First Lady Laura Bush saw the play on invitation from the district. The theater company toured it nationally in 2007.

In 2009, the library district received the National Book Foundation—Innovation in Reading Prize for developing innovative means for creating and sustaining a lifelong love of reading — awarded to the District for its "Dewey-less" libraries. Several of the libraries in the district have adopted a bookstore format for shelving books and media by subject matter to make finding them easier for customers.

In 2017, the Library District was recognized as one of NACo's 100 Brilliant Ideas at work for its Teens Give Back program. In 2018, the Library District received 12 national awards from the National Association of Counties (NACo).
