= Oracle, Arizona =

CDP in Pinal County, Arizona

- CDP
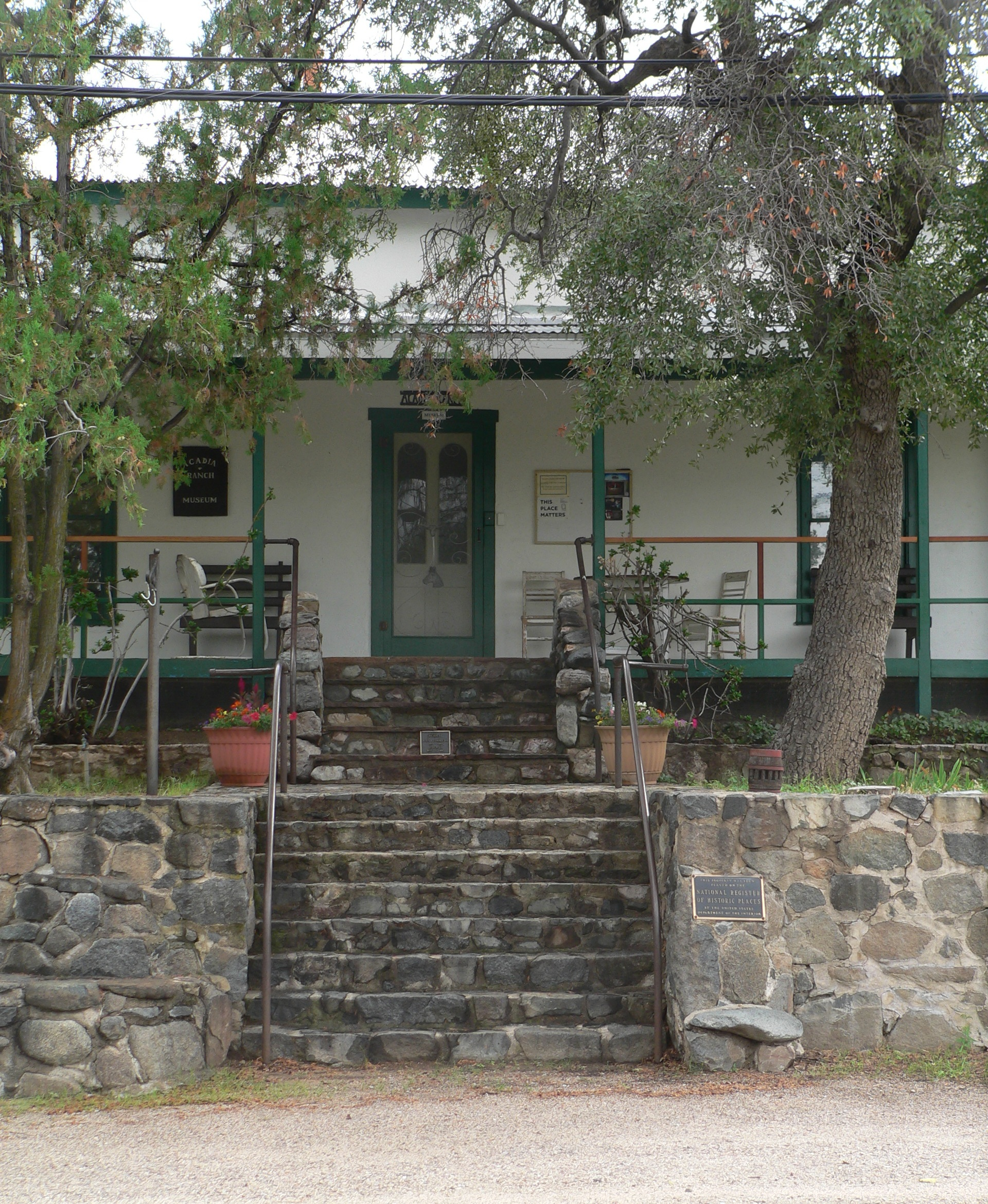
- Acadia Ranch Museum

- Location in Pinal County and the state of Arizona

- Location in the United States
- Coordinates: 32°36′58″N 110°46′55″W
- Country: United States
- State: Arizona
- County: Pinal

Area
  - Total: 15.87 sq mi (41.10 km^{2})
  - Land: 15.87 sq mi (41.10 km^{2})
  - Water: 0 sq mi (0.00 km^{2})
- Elevation: 4,524 ft (1,379 m)

Population (2020)
  - Total: 3,051
  - Density: 192.3/sq mi (74.24/km^{2})
- Time zone: UTC-7 (MST (no DST))
- ZIP code: 85623
- Area code: 520
- FIPS code: 04-51180
- GNIS feature ID: 32541

Oracle is a census-designated place (CDP) in Pinal County, Arizona, United States. The population was 3,686 at the 2010 Census, falling to 3,051 at the 2020 Census.

Oracle State Park is adjacent. The Arizona Trail passes through the Park and community. Oracle is the gateway to the road up the north face of Mount Lemmon, which starts off of American Avenue and currently offers a secondary route to the top. Prior to the construction of the Catalina Highway on the opposite side of the Santa Catalina range, the Oracle Control Road was the only road access to the mountain community of Summerhaven. The term "control road" derives from the fact that the direction of traffic was restricted to one-way only, either up or down at alternate times of day, to prevent motorists from having to pass one another on the narrow, steep road. This route is now popular mainly with off-road 4x4 drivers and with off-road or dual-purpose motorcyclists, and should not be attempted by regular passenger cars or street motorcycles. This road ends at the Catalina Highway near Loma Linda.

The community is the location of the Biosphere 2 experiment. Oracle was also the postal address for environmentalist author Edward Abbey, who never lived in the town but visited often. Buffalo Bill Cody owned the High Jinks Gold Mine in Oracle briefly and, in 1911, appeared as "Santa" for a group of local children. Oracle is becoming a bedroom community for Tucson, but large-scale development is opposed by many residents.

== History ==
The name "Oracle" comes from early prospectors. Albert Weldon came to the area looking for gold and silver. He and some other companions named their first mine The Oracle after the ship Weldon had traveled on. The community was later named after its first mine, and thus, indirectly, after a ship.

The community began to grow in the late 1870s, as gold and silver were discovered, and the Christmas and New Year mines opened. By 1880, a post office had been established.

The community also became a retreat for people suffering from tuberculosis. The Acadia Ranch – built in Oracle in 1882 by Edwin S. and Lillian Dodge – was, during this time, a sanitorium.

=== Alternative history ===
On January 1, 2017, in the Arizona Daily Star newspaper, historian David Leighton challenged the accepted history of the town of Oracle:

He wrote that Albert Weldon, who was born about 1840 in New Brunswick, Canada, traveled on his uncle Capt. A.D. Wood's ship Oracle around Cape Horn at the tip of South America and arrived in California between 1857 and 1860. Weldon enlisted as a private in Company E, 5th California Infantry, of the Union Army in 1861. This unit was attached to the California Column and soon marched to Tucson where Weldon was posted at a nearby stage station before moving east and eventually being honorably discharged in Mesilla, New Mexico in 1864.

After his military service he returned to California and was involved in mining and also lumber. In 1876 he returned to Arizona. Within a couple of years he found a partner in Irishman Jimmie Lee and both men traveled northeast of Tucson into the Santa Catalina Mountains in search of precious metal. Soon he found a mining claim and named it Oracle in honor of his uncle's ship.

The ship Oracle was built under the supervision of Captain Charles E. Ranlett and was constructed for the shipbuilding firm Chapman & Flint of Maine. It was launched in 1853 and was a temperance ship (one that didn't allow alcohol aboard) and sailed to ports across the globe including Melbourne, Australia and Shanghai, China. It was captained by Weldon's uncle for several years.

Weldon was soon joined by Alexander McKay, an immigrant from Scotland who located two mining claims named Christmas and New Years because of the days they were discovered. McKay also built a one-room house, the first in the area, and from it, the village grew. When it was time for a post office to be named, Oracle was the name eventually chosen.

Leighton stated that the town of Oracle takes its name from the Oracle Mine which took its name from the ship Oracle and that he believes the ship took its name from an oracle – a shrine dedicated to a particular god where people went to consult a priest or priestess in times of trouble or uncertainty – called the Temple of Apollo at Didyma in present-day Aydın Province, Turkey, not the oracle at Delphi, Greece believed by some to be the origin of the name. He also explained that there were two ships named Oracle made by the same shipbuilder, the second one being launched in 1876 but that this later ship wasn't the boat that Weldon traveled on, as some sources have said.

== Geography ==
Oracle is located at 32°36′58″N 110°46′55″W (32.616030, -110.781854).

According to the United States Census Bureau, the CDP has a total area of 16.4 square miles (42 km^{2}), all land.

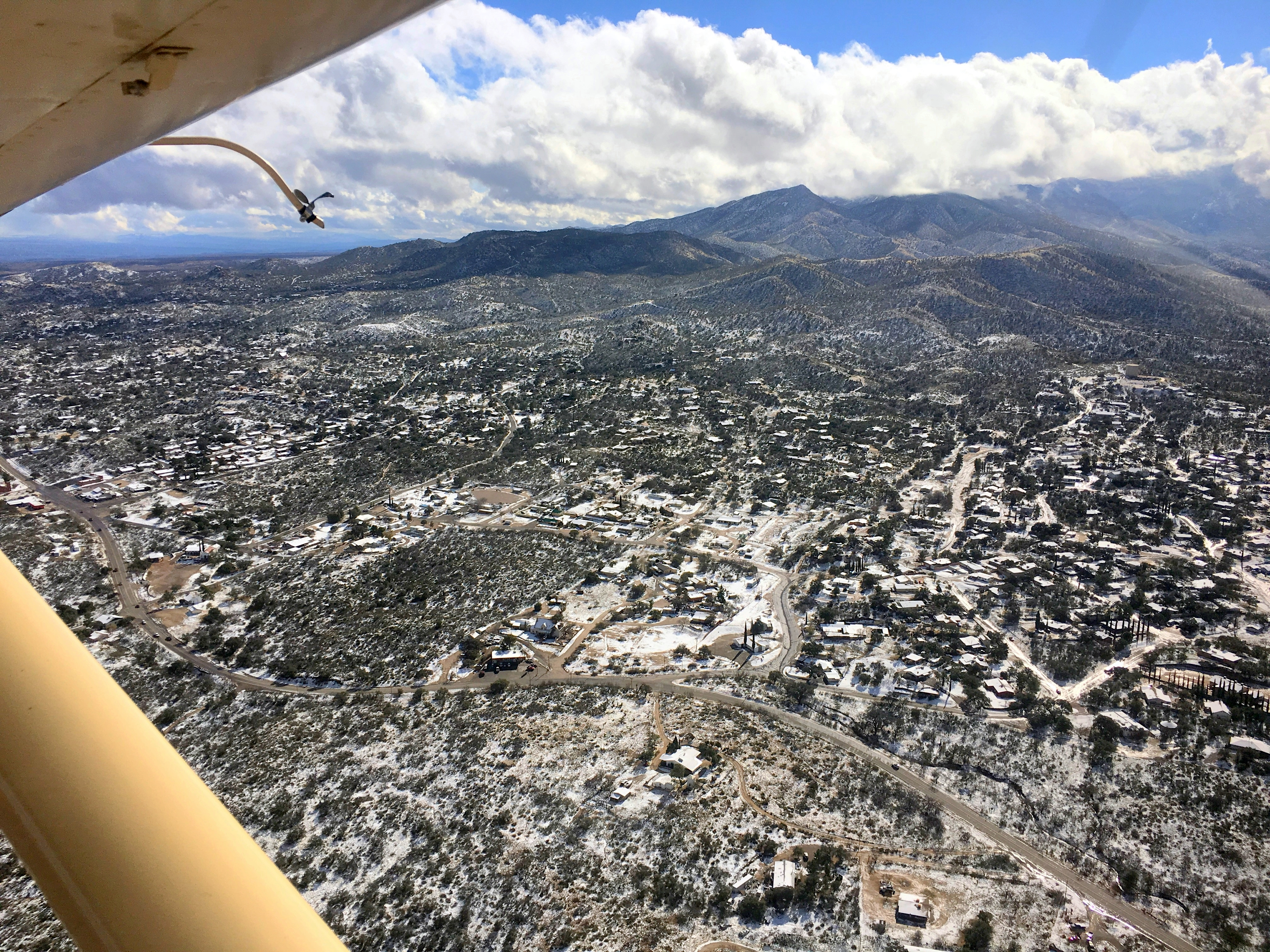
Oracle, Arizona from the air looking south with the Santa Catalina Mountains in the background

== Geology ==
Oracle and the surrounding area sit largely on a slab of granite called "Oracle granite" that is visible as red or grey-and-white speckled "boulders" rising over the scrub and grass. It is mostly porphyritic biotite Precambrian granite with large microcline phenocrysts, and has occasional inclusions of white and milky quartz and pegmatite. The granite rarely contains ore and veins of gold or silver, and sometimes copper.

== Climate ==
At an altitude of 4,500 feet (1,400 m), Oracle has a Mediterranean climate (Köppen Csa), somewhat similar to Prescott further northwestward. Unlike most climates of its type, only the early summer is dry, with monsoonal thunderstorms producing substantial rain in July and August. The winter season from October to March is cool to pleasant by day and chilly by night, with occasional wet spells.

Summer temperatures are hot, though less extreme than lowland Arizona: 86 afternoons typically exceed 90 °F or 32.2 °C, only about half as many as Tucson, but only ten top 100 °F or 37.8 °C, which is one-seventh the number expected in Tucson. The average window for temperatures of 90 degrees is from May 13 to September 30, and for century temperatures from June 25 to July 28. Freezing temperatures occur on 45 mornings annually; the record low is 2 °F or −16.7 °C on January 22, 1937, part of the coldest month on record with an average of 34.7 °F or 1.5 °C and a mean minimum of 21.6 °F (−5.8 °C). The hottest temperature has been 110 °F or 43.3 °C on June 16, 2021.

The wettest month has been January 1993 with 10.96 inches or 278.4 millimetres, the wettest calendar year 1983 with 43.85 inches or 1,113.8 millimetres, and the driest 2020 with 6.37 inches or 161.8 millimetres. The wettest day has been July 14, 2021 with 4.83 inches or 122.7 millimetres. Snowfall may occur during cold spells in winter: the most snow in one month was 26.3 inches or 0.67 metres in January 1937. The most snow in one season was 41.1 inches or 1.0 metre between July 1990 and June 1991; in contrast no measurable snow fell in 1926–27, 1973–74 and 2021–22. The most snow on the ground has been 16 inches (0.41 m) on January 9, 1937.

Climate data for Oracle, Arizona, 1991–2020 normals, extremes 1893–present
Month	Jan	Feb	Mar	Apr	May	Jun	Jul	Aug	Sep	Oct	Nov	Dec	Year
Record high °F (°C)	83 (28)	83 (28)	97 (36)	97 (36)	104 (40)	110 (43)	109 (43)	106 (41)	104 (40)	100 (38)	88 (31)	80 (27)	110 (43)
Mean maximum °F (°C)	68.1 (20.1)	71.6 (22.0)	77.3 (25.2)	84.5 (29.2)	93.4 (34.1)	100.6 (38.1)	101.2 (38.4)	98.2 (36.8)	94.5 (34.7)	89.5 (31.9)	78.0 (25.6)	68.9 (20.5)	102.8 (39.3)
Mean daily maximum °F (°C)	55.5 (13.1)	57.9 (14.4)	63.9 (17.7)	70.9 (21.6)	82.0 (27.8)	92.0 (33.3)	91.4 (33.0)	89.6 (32.0)	85.7 (29.8)	76.7 (24.8)	63.9 (17.7)	54.8 (12.7)	73.7 (23.2)
Daily mean °F (°C)	45.3 (7.4)	47.6 (8.7)	52.8 (11.6)	58.3 (14.6)	69.0 (20.6)	78.8 (26.0)	80.1 (26.7)	78.4 (25.8)	74.5 (23.6)	64.6 (18.1)	52.9 (11.6)	45.2 (7.3)	62.3 (16.8)
Mean daily minimum °F (°C)	35.2 (1.8)	37.2 (2.9)	41.7 (5.4)	45.7 (7.6)	55.9 (13.3)	65.5 (18.6)	68.8 (20.4)	67.2 (19.6)	63.3 (17.4)	52.4 (11.3)	41.8 (5.4)	35.6 (2.0)	50.9 (10.5)
Mean minimum °F (°C)	20.2 (−6.6)	23.3 (−4.8)	27.2 (−2.7)	31.1 (−0.5)	41.0 (5.0)	51.0 (10.6)	59.0 (15.0)	59.7 (15.4)	51.1 (10.6)	36.4 (2.4)	25.3 (−3.7)	19.8 (−6.8)	17.0 (−8.3)
Record low °F (°C)	2 (−17)	4 (−16)	15 (−9)	22 (−6)	25 (−4)	37 (3)	38 (3)	50 (10)	39 (4)	21 (−6)	14 (−10)	6 (−14)	2 (−17)
Average precipitation inches (mm)	2.29 (58)	2.07 (53)	1.66 (42)	0.64 (16)	0.50 (13)	0.32 (8.1)	4.25 (108)	3.80 (97)	1.84 (47)	1.08 (27)	1.28 (33)	1.97 (50)	21.70 (551)
Average snowfall inches (cm)	2.9 (7.4)	1.9 (4.8)	2.5 (6.4)	1.2 (3.0)	0.0 (0.0)	0.0 (0.0)	0.0 (0.0)	0.0 (0.0)	0.0 (0.0)	0.0 (0.0)	0.5 (1.3)	1.8 (4.6)	10.8 (27.5)
Average precipitation days (≥ 0.01 in)	6.5	6.4	5.7	2.5	2.3	2.1	9.5	12.1	6.0	4.4	3.9	5.3	66.7
Average snowy days (≥ 0.1 in)	0.9	0.9	0.5	0.4	0.0	0.0	0.0	0.0	0.0	0.0	0.2	1.0	3.9
Source 1: NOAA
Source 2: National Weather Service

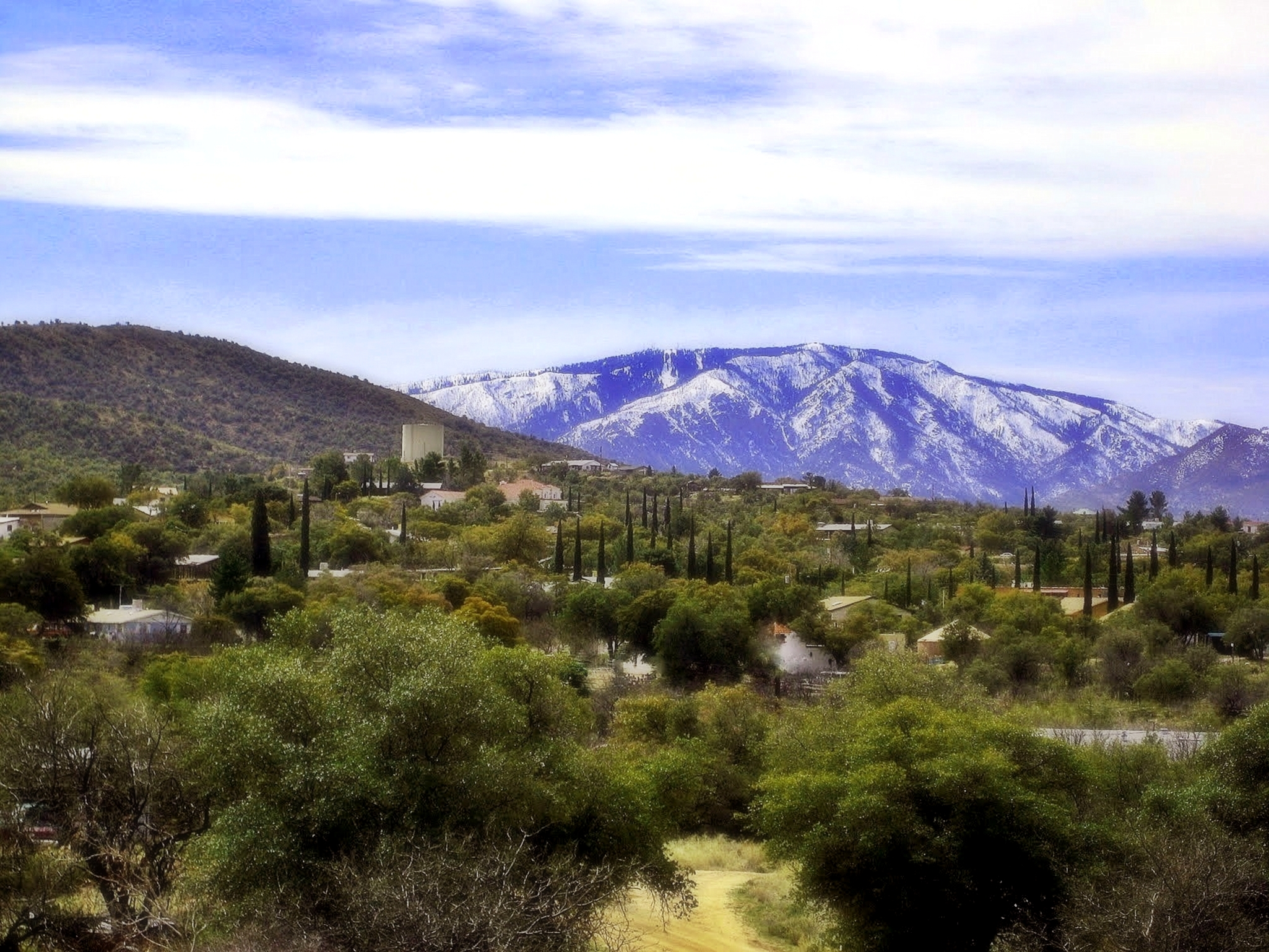
Oracle, AZ – Mt. Lemmon in background.

== Ecology ==
Flora includes:

Trees - emory oak, alligator juniper, velvet mesquite, netleaf hackberry, Arizona ash, Arizona sycamore, Arizona walnut, soapberry

Shrubs - point-leaf manzanita, holly-leaf buckthorn, lemonade berry, oreganillo, Thurber’s desert honeysuckle, turpentine bush, Wright's silktassel, yellow bells, burroweed, pale wolfberry

Succulents - ocotillo, golden-flowered agave, mescal agave, sotol, soaptree yucca, beargrass, pinkflower hedgehog cactus, Engelmann’s prickly pear, fishhook barrel cactus, cane cholla

Forbs - beardlip penstemon, showy four o’clock, sacred datura, Goodding verbena, fairy duster, tufted evening primrose, desert tobacco, desert marigold, New Mexico thistle, blue flax, Arizona mariposa lily

Grasses - sideoats grama, deer grass, purple three-awn, sand dropseed

Fauna includes:

Reptiles - greater roadrunner, common raven, acorn woodpecker, great horned owl, zone-tailed hawk, Cooper’s hawk, wild turkey, Gambel’s quail, cactus wren, curve-billed thrasher, hooded oriole, northern cardinal, Lucy’s warbler, vermilion flycatcher, broad-billed hummingbird, Gila monster, Clark’s spiny lizard, Madrean alligator lizard, coachwhip, gopher snake

Amphibians - red-spotted toad, Sonoran Desert toad, canyon tree frog

Insects - black swalllowtail, Arizona sister, white-lined sphinx, Hubbard’s silk moth, Sonoran bumblebee, tarantula hawk, western short-horn walkingstick, western rhinoceros beetle, darkling beetles, rainbow grasshopper, flame skimmer, Arizona mantis

Arachnids - green lynx spider, desert blonde tarantula, Western black widow, giant crab spider, white-banded crab spider, Arizona bark scorpion, stripe-tailed scorpion, windscorpion, giant velvet mite (D. magnificum)

Mammals - mule deer, Coue’s white-tailed deer, mountain lion, bobcat, gray fox, coyote, striped skunk, hog-nosed skunk, javelina, white-nosed coati, rock squirrel, Harris's antelope squirrel, Arizona cotton rat, desert cottontail, pallid bat

The Oracle region once sustained more extensive and biodiverse grassland ecosystems, but widespread and poorly regulated cattle ranching has largely depleted them. An ongoing transition to a mesquite/opuntia/invasive grass-dominated landscape is occurring.

== Attractions and events ==
- Oracle State Park
- Biosphere 2
- Acadia Ranch Museum, operated by the Oracle Historical Society, local history
- GLOW, an annual nighttime multimedia art event coinciding with the full moon.
- Peppersauce Cave, a limestone cave with approximately 1.6 kilometers of mapped passages.
- YMCA Triangle Y Ranch Camp
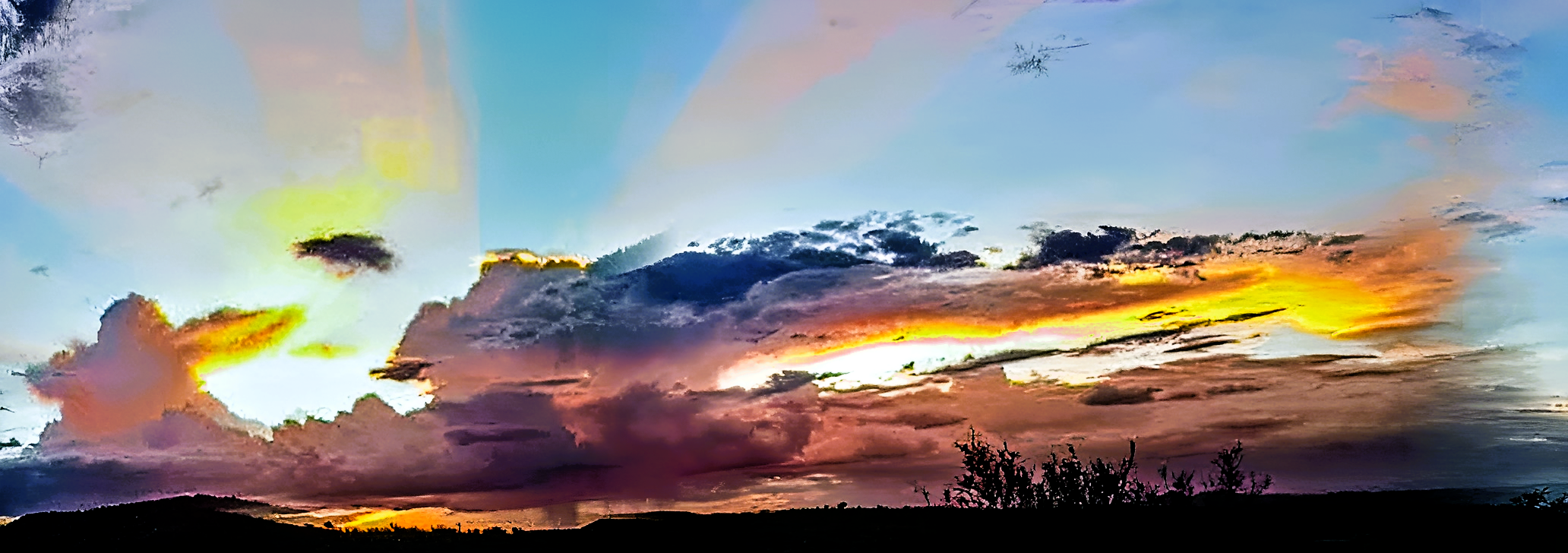
  Oracle, Arizona has many spectacular sunsets, especially during the monsoon season. This is a truly exceptional example.

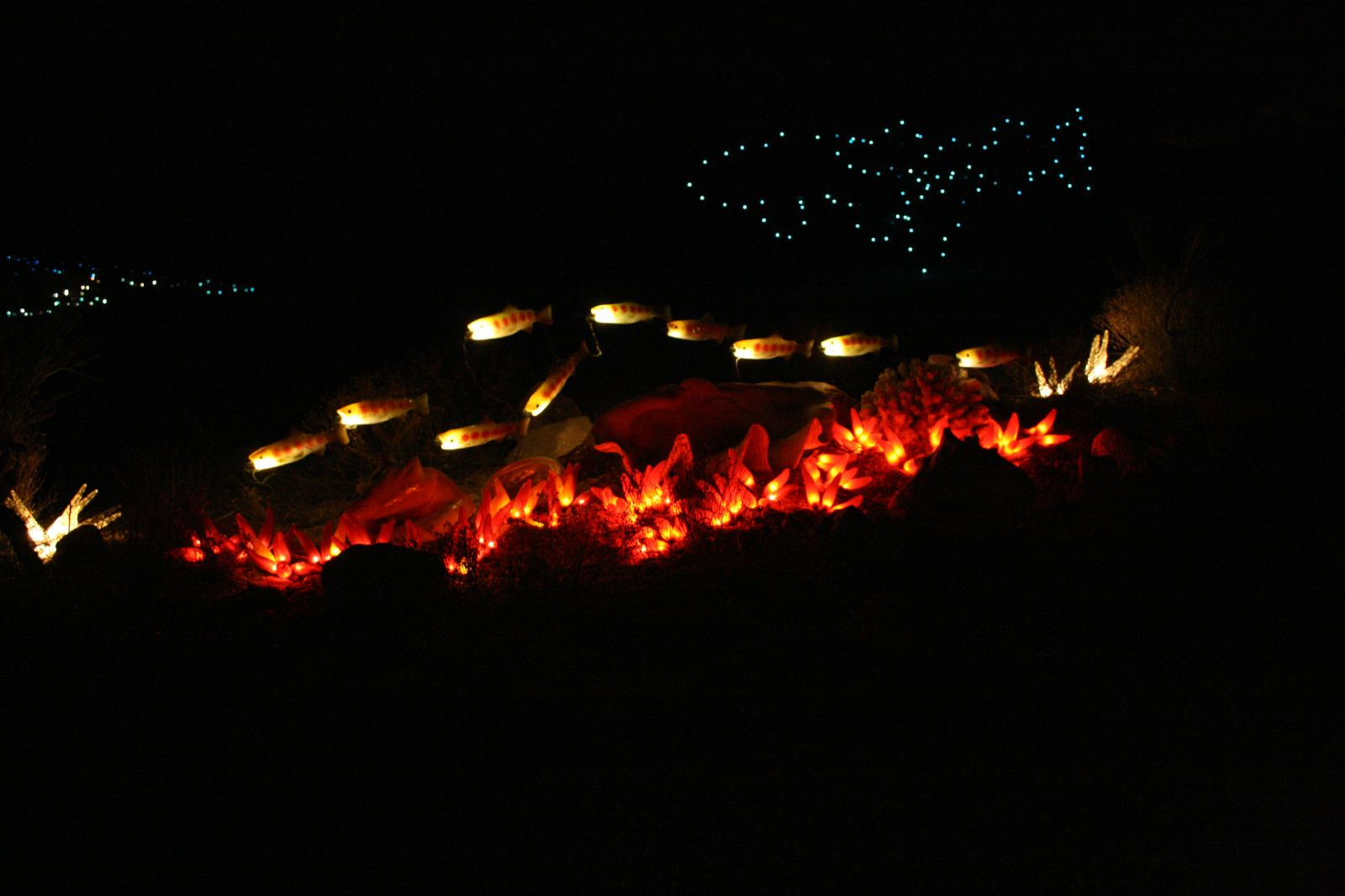
GLOW 2007 exhibit

== Demographics ==
Historical population
Census	Pop.	Note	%±
2000	3,563		—
2010	3,686		3.5%
2020	3,051		−17.2%
U.S. Decennial Census

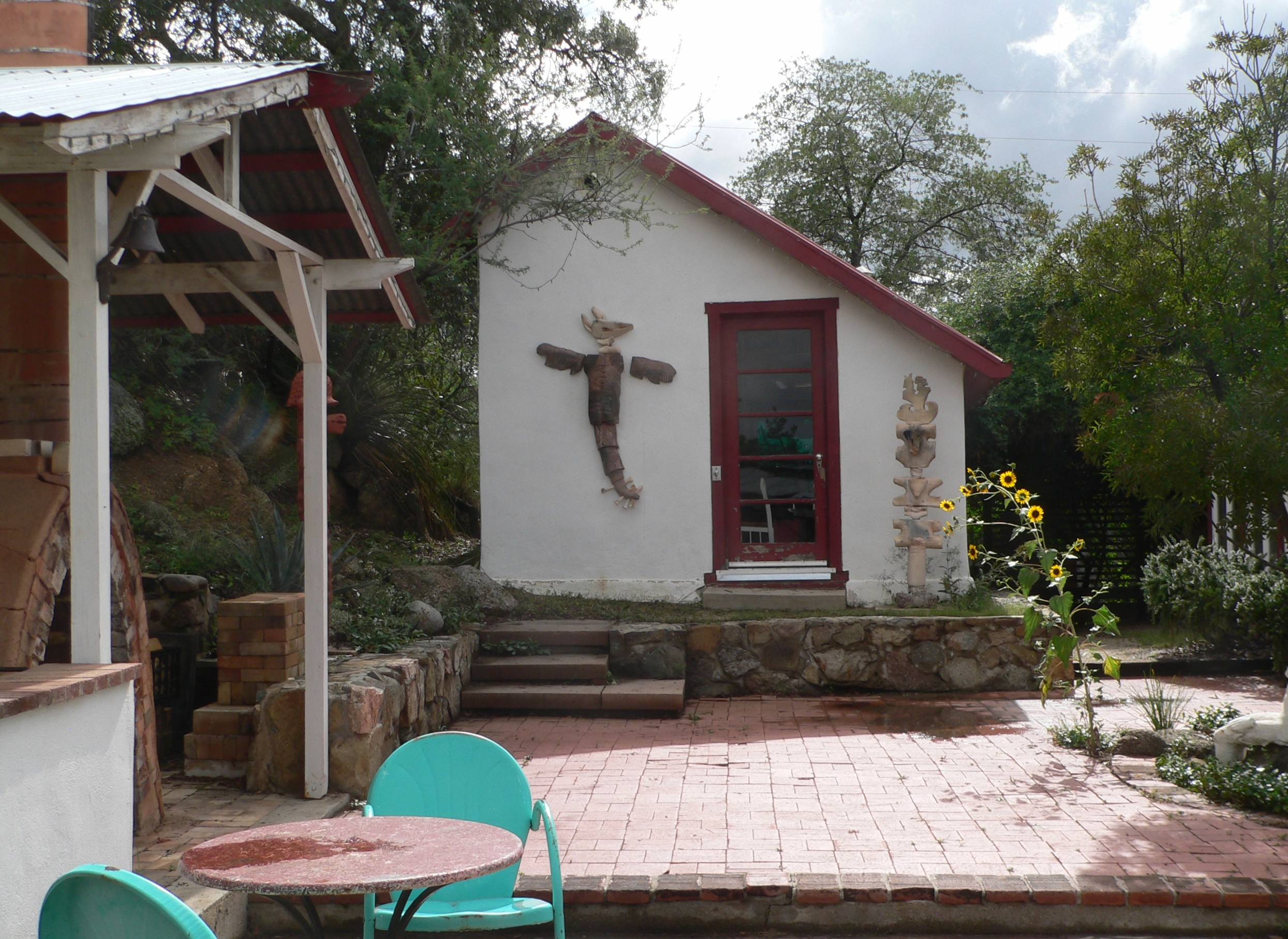
Rancho Linda Vista, listed on the National Register of Historic Places in Pinal County, Arizona

=== 2020 census ===
As of the 2020 census, Oracle had a population of 3,051. The median age was 54.4 years. 16.3% of residents were under the age of 18 and 32.9% of residents were 65 years of age or older. For every 100 females there were 98.5 males, and for every 100 females age 18 and over there were 97.7 males age 18 and over.

0.0% of residents lived in urban areas, while 100.0% lived in rural areas.

There were 1,358 households in Oracle, of which 18.4% had children under the age of 18 living in them. Of all households, 46.1% were married-couple households, 21.4% were households with a male householder and no spouse or partner present, and 24.4% were households with a female householder and no spouse or partner present. About 32.6% of all households were made up of individuals and 20.2% had someone living alone who was 65 years of age or older.

There were 1,586 housing units, of which 14.4% were vacant. The homeowner vacancy rate was 2.6% and the rental vacancy rate was 17.8%.

Racial composition as of the 2020 census
Race	Number	Percent
White	2,055	67.4%
Black or African American	14	0.5%
American Indian and Alaska Native	47	1.5%
Asian	18	0.6%
Native Hawaiian and Other Pacific Islander	8	0.3%
Some other race	337	11.0%
Two or more races	572	18.7%
Hispanic or Latino (of any race)	1,190	39.0%

=== 2000 census ===
As of the census of 2000, there were 3,563 people, 1,384 households, and 1,004 families residing in the CDP. The population density was 313.0 inhabitants per square mile (120.8/km^{2}). There were 1,534 housing units at an average density of 134.8 per square mile (52.0/km^{2}). The racial makeup of the CDP was 77.0% White or European American, 0.1% Black or African American, 1.5% Native American, 0.1% Asian, 0.2% Pacific Islander, 17.3% from other races, and 3.8% from two or more races. 38.3% of the population were Hispanic or Latino of any race.

There were 1,384 households, out of which 31.5% had children under the age of 18 living with them, 57.0% were married couples living together, 10.4% had a female householder with no spouse present, and 27.4% were non-families. 23.4% of all households were made up of individuals, and 7.4% had someone living alone who was 65 years of age or older. The average household size was 2.6 and the average family size was 3.0.

In the CDP, the population was spread out, with 26.4% under the age of 18, 7.7% from 18 to 24, 24.6% from 25 to 44, 27.8% from 45 to 64, and 13.5% who were 65 years of age or older. The median age was 40 years. For every 100 females, there were 97.5 males. For every 100 females age 18 and over, there were 95.8 males.

The median income for a household in the CDP was $38,267, and the median income for a family was $46,026. Males had a median income of $37,667 versus $30,667 for females. The per capita income for the CDP was $19,459. About 8.0% of families and 10.0% of the population were below the poverty line, including 10.8% of those under age 18 and 3.2% of those age 65 or over.

== Notable people ==
- Roger Avary, film director, screenwriter and producer
- Robert D. Cocke, painter
- James G. Davis, contemporary artist
- Ella Howard Estill, painter
- Joanna McClure, poet
- Tullis Onstott, geoscientist
- John A. Roebling II, civil engineer and philanthropist

== See also ==
- Santa Catalina Ranger District of the Coronado National Forest
