= Parabacillus coloradus =

Scientific classification
- Domain: Eukaryota
- Kingdom: Animalia
- Phylum: Arthropoda
- Class: Insecta
- Order: Phasmatodea
- Family: Heteronemiidae
- Genus: Parabacillus
- Species: P. coloradus

Binomial name
- Parabacillus coloradus (Scudder, 1893)

Species of insect

Parabacillus coloradus, the Colorado short-horn walkingstick, is a species of walkingstick in the family Heteronemiidae. It is found in North America.
