= Oracle State Park =

Historic place in Pinal County, Arizona

- Location within Arizona
- Location: Pinal County, Arizona, United States
- Coordinates: 32°20′10″N 110°26′55″W
- Area: 3948
- Elevation: 4,500 ft (1,400 m)
- Established: 1985
- Administrator: Arizona State Parks & Trails
- Visitors: 8,904 (in 2024)
- Website: Official website
- Kannally Ranch
- U.S. National Register of Historic Places
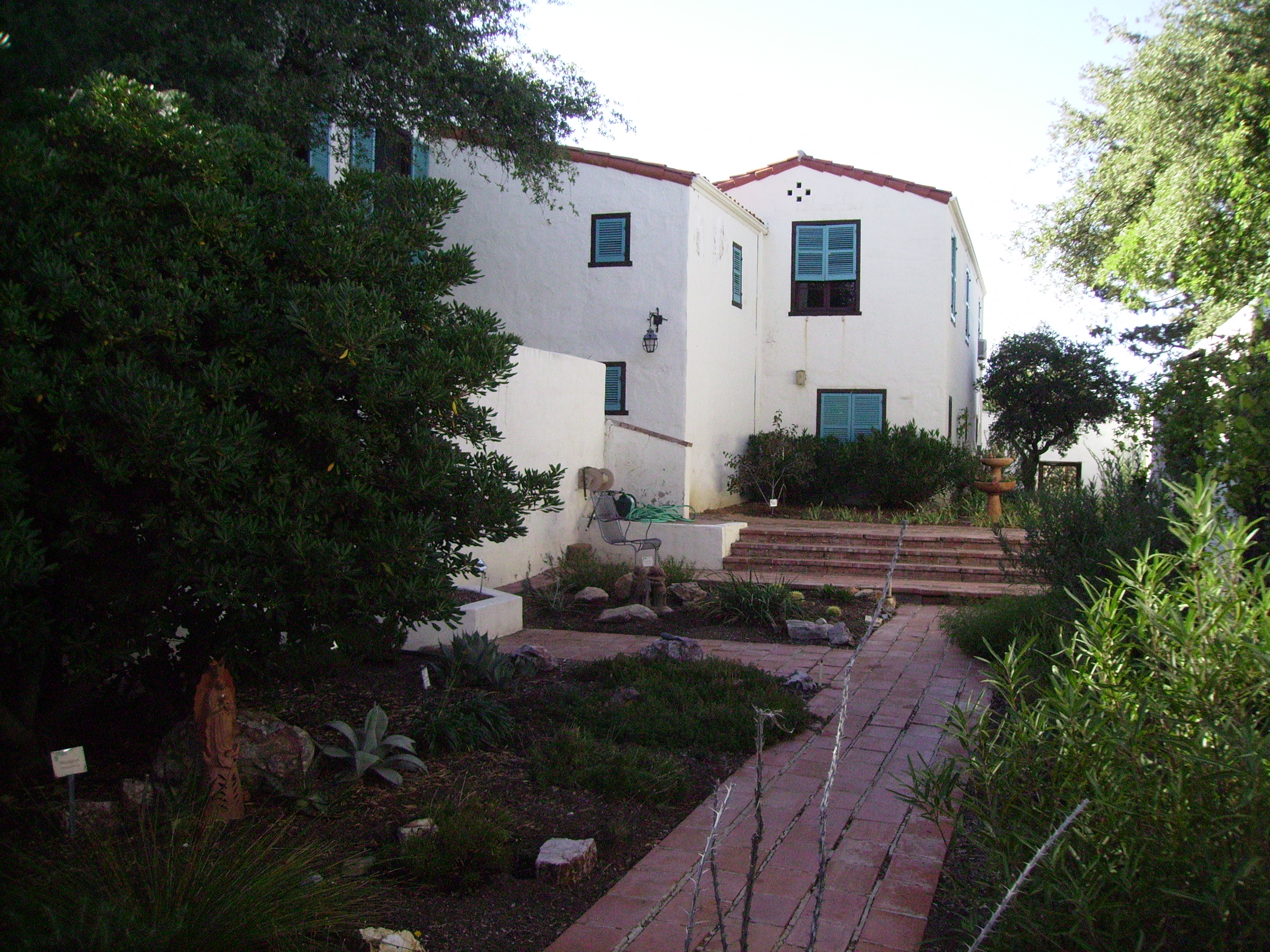
- The Kannally Ranch house
- Location: Mt. Lemmon Hwy, E of Oracle
- Nearest city: Oracle, Arizona
- Coordinates: 32°36′35″N 110°44′1″W
- Area: Less than one acre
- Built: 1929
- Architectural style: Spanish Colonial Revival
- NRHP reference No.: 96000307
- Added to NRHP: March 28, 1996

Oracle State Park is a state park of Arizona, United States, preserving 3,948 acres (1,598 ha) in the northeastern foothills of the Santa Catalina Mountains. The park is named after the nearby town of Oracle and serves as a wildlife refuge. The park has more than 15 miles (24 km) of hiking trails, including 7 miles (11 km) of the Arizona Trail.

== History ==
Starting in 1902, the area that is now the park was owned and operated as a cattle ranch by Neal Kannally and his family. Kannally journeyed from his home in Illinois to a tuberculosis health resort in what is not Oracle. As Neal's health improved, his brother Lee joined him in Arizona and purchased a 160-acre ranch nearby. At its largest, the ranch encompassed 50,000 acres, most of which was eventually sold off to mining companies.

The remaining property was occupied until Neal's last remaining sibling, Lucile, bequeathed it to the Defenders of Wildlife organization in 1976, and ten years later, the land was donated to the state of Arizona to create a wildlife refuge.

In October 2011, Arizona State Parks agreed to reopen Oracle on a limited basis with a $40,000 budget if the park's Friends group can raise $21,000 in additional funds.

In 2014, the International Dark-Sky Association designated Oracle State Park as a Dark Sky Park.

== Flora and fauna ==
=== Plants ===
The most common plants in Oracle State Park are prickly pear and cholla cactus, scrub oak, mesquite, many wildflowers, and the occasional piñon and juniper. A solitary saguaro cactus is located in the park. The original ranch house, which was converted to be the park headquarters, has some cypress trees nearby.

=== Wildlife ===
Bird species include red-tailed hawks, golden eagles, prairie falcons, black-throated sparrows, Gambel's quail, cactus wrens, pyrrhuloxia, northern mockingbirds, northern flickers, common poorwills, northern cardinals, and great horned owls. Many mammals inhabit the park, such as ringtails, javelinas, cougars, rock squirrels, desert cottontails, black-tailed jackrabbits, mule deer, and white-tailed deer. Reptiles and amphibians found in the area include the western box turtles, Arizona alligator lizards, Colorado River toads, bull snakes, and western diamondback rattlesnakes.

== Kannally Ranch House ==
The Kannally Ranch House is a historic house museum with original art and historic photos. The four-level adobe home was constructed between 1929 and 1933, features Mediterranean and Moorish architectural influences and is listed on the National Register of Historic Places. The ranch house is open for self guided tours during park hours.

== Center for Environmental Education ==
The purpose of the park is to "protect the designated wildlife refuge and act as an environmental learning center. The park offers natural history and environmental education programs for school and adult groups, including trail walks, workshops, presentations and special events.
