= Acadia Ranch =

Historic place in Pinal County, Arizona

- U.S. National Register of Historic Places
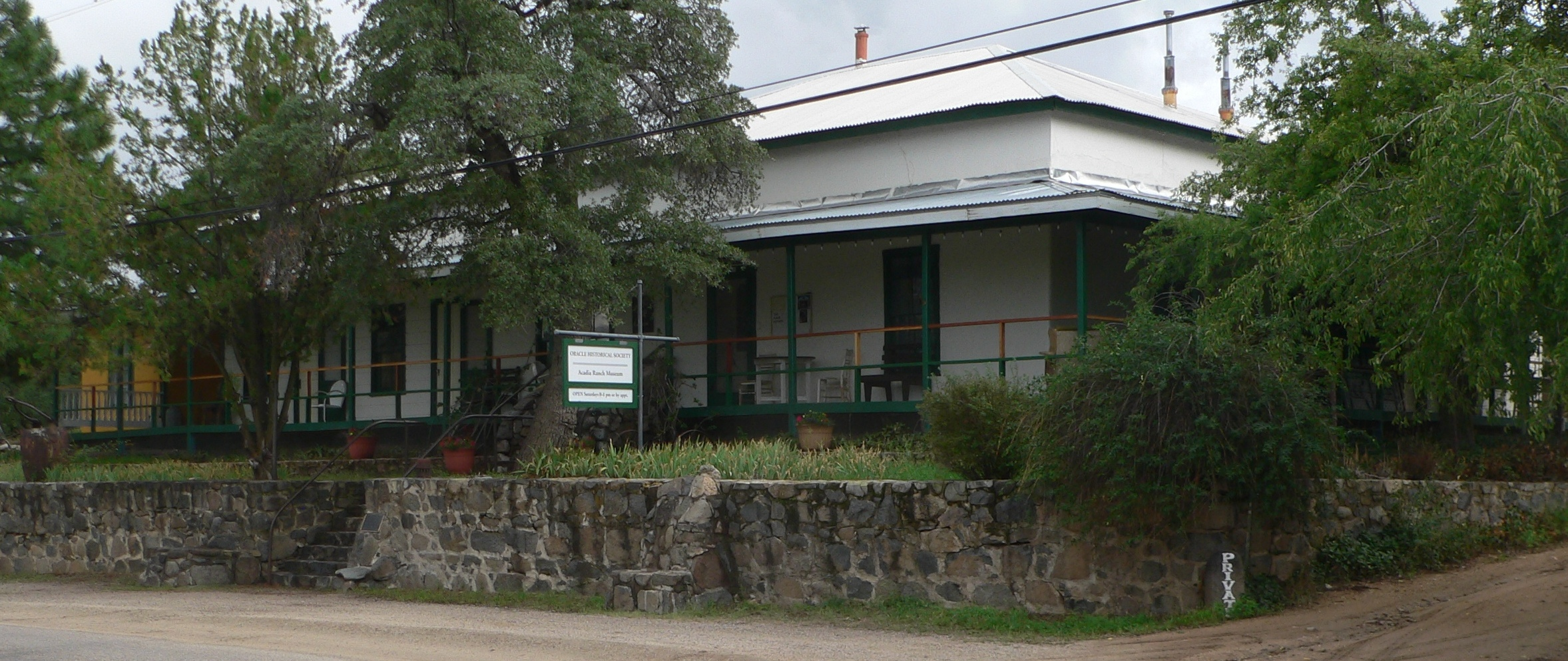
- Main house in 2013

- Location within Arizona
- Location: AZ 77, or 825 E. Mt. Lemmon Highway, Oracle, Arizona
- Coordinates: 32.609556°N 110.764955°W
- Area: less than one acre
- Built: c.1880s
- NRHP reference No.: 84000765
- Added to NRHP: February 22, 1984

The Acadia Ranch, now the Acadia Ranch Museum and home of the Oracle Historical Society, at 825 E. Mt. Lemmon Highway in Oracle in Pinal County, Arizona, is a historic ranch complex built up during 1885 to 1930. A portion of the ranch was listed on the National Register of Historic Places in 1984. The listing included two contributing buildings: the Acadia Ranch House and an outbuilding which includes a smokehouse and a garage. It also included a contributing structure: a water tower.

The property was developed as a lodging house for travelers and summer visitors in the 1880s by Mr. and Mrs. Edwin S. Dodge, in partnership with a Jack Aldwinkle. One room served as Oracle's U.S. Post Office from 1985 to 1901. The Dodges had previously operated a lodging house in Tucson, which is 35 miles (56 km) to the south; the Oracle location, at an elevation of 4,500 feet (1,400 m) in the foothills of the Santa Catalina Mountains, is markedly cooler.

The Acadia Ranch House, the main house of the ranch, faces north on E. Mt. Lemmon Highway, a principal street through Oracle, which, in 1984, was Arizona State Route 77 (AZ 77). The AZ 77 highway was rerouted in 1964, and now goes around Oracle on the north; E. American Avenue, very close to the house, is also known as Old Highway 77.

The main house is a one-story L-shaped building incorporating a five-room adobe original area about 29 by 40 feet (8.8 m × 12.2 m) in plan, and frame, stone, and adobe additions. It has a shed-roofed porch on its north side, facing the street, and extending around the west side, unifying the north elevation. The north side consists of the adobe and stucco core (built in two phases ca. 1880's), a breezeway, and a one-room adobe structure (ca. 1915) to the east.

The Acadia Ranch water tower is a contributing structure, southeast of the main house. It is about 12 by 12 feet (3.7 m × 3.7 m) in plan and is upon a small hill.

The complex was deemed "historically significant for its association with a regional industry oriented towards health and tourism. Also, the Ranch is architecturally significant, within a local context, for its use of adobe as the primary building material. The main house is also important for its evolutionary additive character which reflects its increased use as both a guest ranch and a health resort."

The smoke house or "ice house" once had four-foot thick adobe walls, which "melted" over the years. This was restored in a project completed in 2013.

The Oracle Historical Society is a 501c3 charitable nonprofit founded in 1977.
