= Joanna McClure =

American poet (born 1930)

- Born: November 10, 1930 (age 95); Pinal County, Arizona (near Oracle)
- Occupations: Poet; Early childhood development and parent education
- Spouses: Albert Hall, 1951 (divorced); Michael McClure, 1954 (divorced)
- Children: 1
- Parent(s): Henry Almyr Kinnison and Ramona Jane Hoffman Kinnison
- Writing career
- Language: English

Joanna McClure (born November 10, 1930) is an American poet associated with the writers of the San Francisco Renaissance and the Beat Generation. According to author Brenda Knight, McClure wrote prolifically from the 1950s onward, filling dozens of artist's notebooks with poems and producing "as much writing as [Jack] Kerouac did, though she kept much of hers private."

The child of Henry and Ramona Kinnison, McClure grew up on a ranch near Oracle, Arizona, north of Tucson. After the family lost the ranch during the Great Depression, McClure lived for a time in Tucson, then Hermosillo, Mexico, and Guatemala City, Guatemala, before returning to Tucson to study literature and history at the University of Arizona. She married Albert Hall, a chemist, in 1951, but the marriage ended in divorce. Still in Tucson, she met Michael McClure, a university student who later rose to prominence as a Beat poet.

In 1954, she moved to San Francisco, involving herself in the Beat scene and befriending Miriam and Kenneth Patchen, Allen Ginsberg, Robert Duncan, Phillip Whalen, and other writers and artists. The McClures married in 1954, and their daughter, Jane, was born in 1956. The family moved briefly to New York City in the 1960s before returning to San Francisco, where Joanna pursued her interests in poetry and in early childhood education. The McClures later divorced but remain connected by poetry.

== Bibliography ==
- Winter Solstice, 1972 (1972?) OCLC 4454381
- Gathered (1970s) OCLC 11525470
- Wolf Eyes (1974) OCLC 2034257
- Eulogy (1977) OCLC 16880328
- Extended Love Poem (1978) OCLC 7856771
- A Memory (1979) OCLC 57682995
- Seasons (1981) OCLC 10842237
- Hard Edge (1987) OCLC 18203734
- Catching Light: Collected Poems of Joanna McClure (2013) OCLC 812781160
