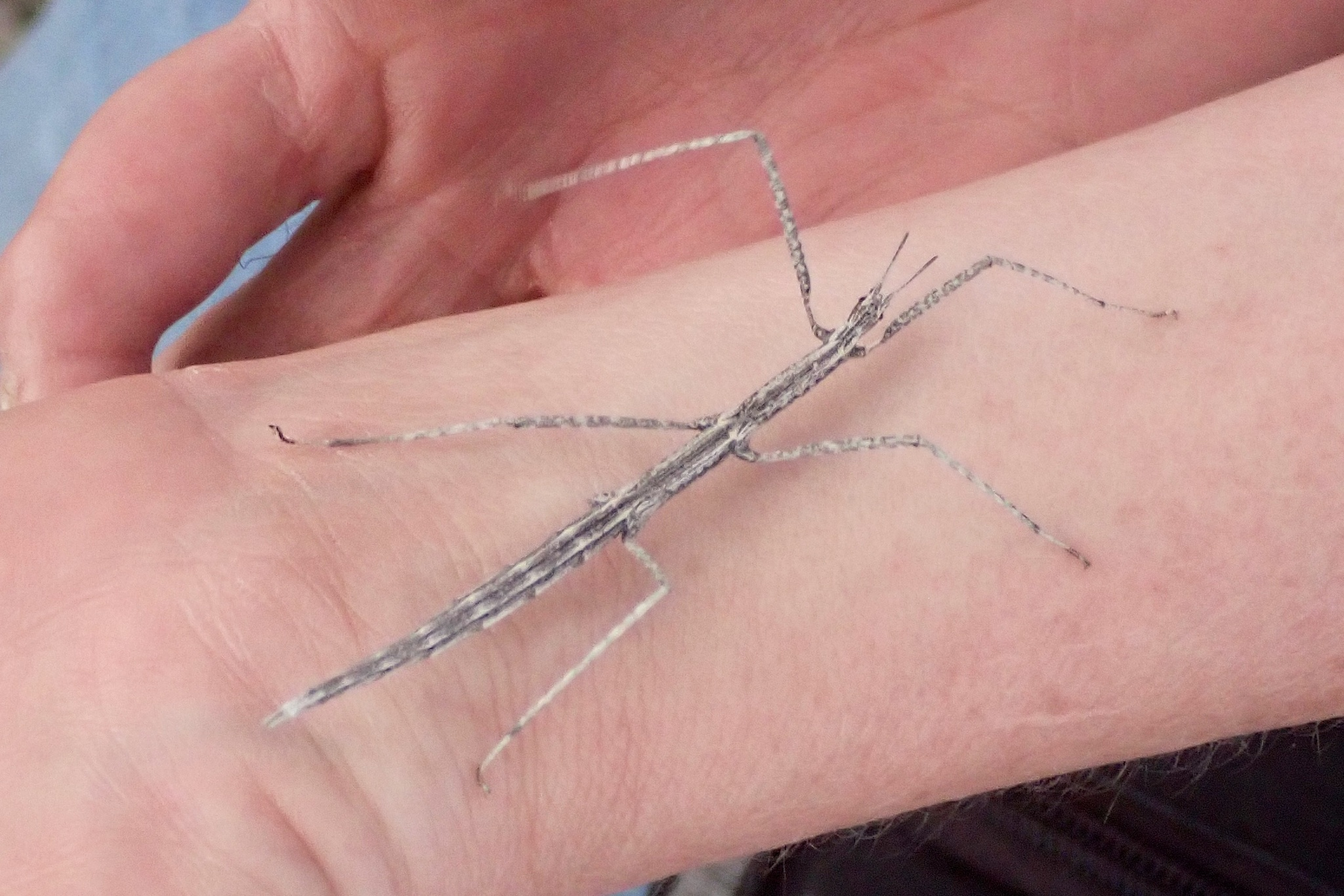

Scientific classification
- Domain: Eukaryota
- Kingdom: Animalia
- Phylum: Arthropoda
- Class: Insecta
- Order: Phasmatodea
- Family: Heteronemiidae
- Genus: Parabacillus
- Species: P. hesperus

Binomial name
- Parabacillus hesperus Hebard, 1934

= Parabacillus hesperus =

Species of insect

Parabacillus hesperus, the western short-horn walkingstick, is a species of walkingstick in the family Heteronemiidae. It is found in North America. This species is found in dry, arid regions. Their diet consists of various scrub and grassland plants. Through an adaptation called "crypsis," it blends in so perfectly with its natural habitat that it often goes completely undetected by would-be predators.
