= Michael McClure =

American writer (1932–2020)

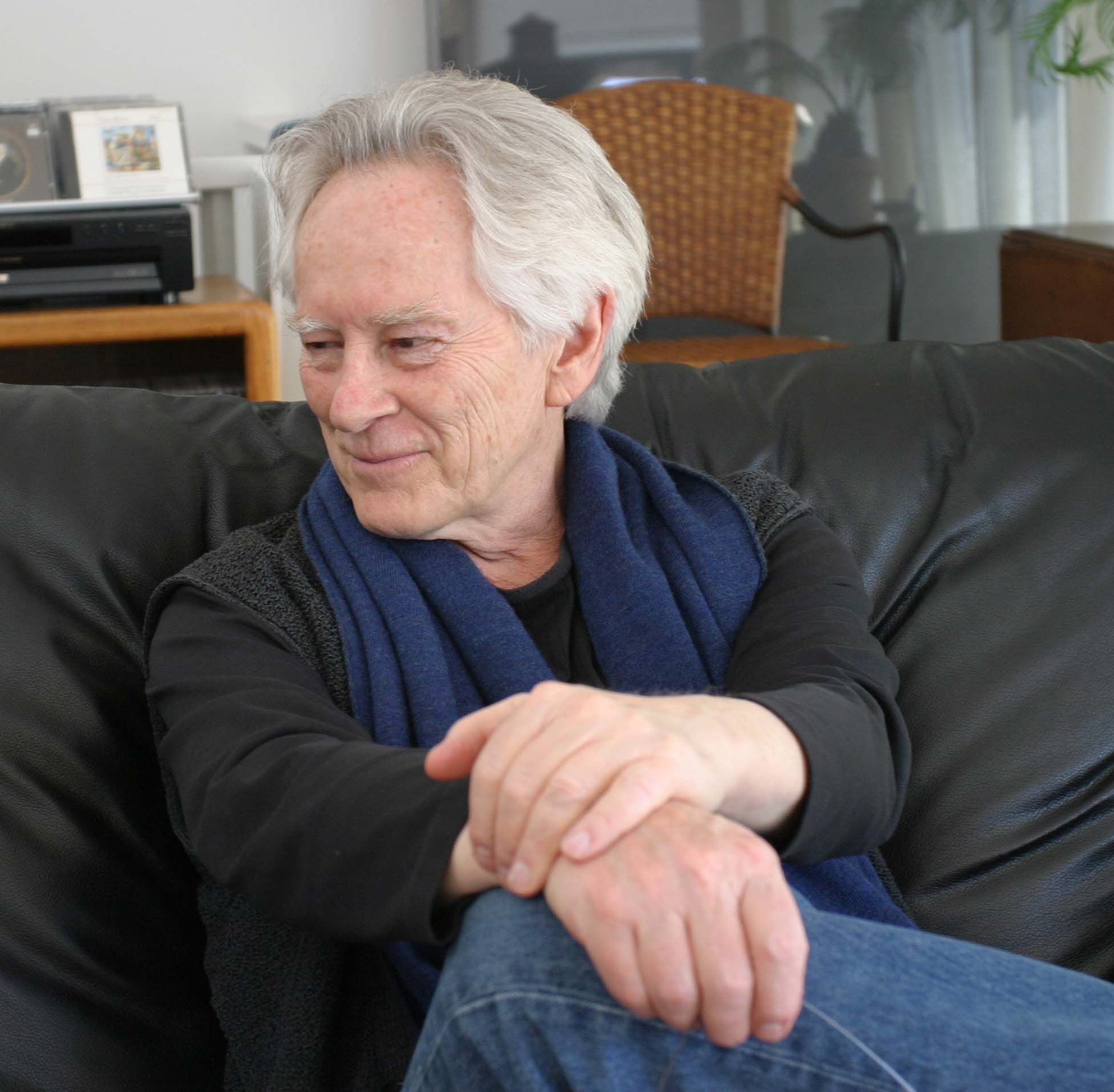
- McClure during the video taping of "Add-Verse", 2004
- Born: October 20, 1932; Marysville, Kansas, U.S.
- Died: May 4, 2020 (aged 87); Oakland, California, U.S.
- Occupations: Poet; songwriter; critic; playwright; professor

Michael McClure (October 20, 1932 – May 4, 2020) was an American poet, playwright, songwriter, and novelist. After moving to San Francisco as a young man, he found fame as one of the five poets (including Allen Ginsberg) who read at the famous San Francisco Six Gallery reading in 1955, which was barely fictionalized in Jack Kerouac's The Dharma Bums. He soon became a key member of the Beat Generation and was immortalized as Pat McLear in Kerouac's Big Sur.

== Career overview ==
Educated at the Municipal University of Wichita (1951–53), the University of Arizona (1953–54), and San Francisco State College (B.A., 1955), McClure published his first book of poetry, Passage, in 1956 by small press publisher Jonathan Williams. Stan Brakhage, a friend of McClure, wrote in the Chicago Review:

McClure always, and more and more as he grows older, gives his reader access to the verbal impulses of his whole body's thought (as distinct from simply and only brain-think, as it is with most who write). He invents a form for the cellular messages of his, a form which will feel as if it were organic on the page; and he sticks with it across his life ...

McClure published eight books of plays and four collections of essays, including essays on Bob Dylan and the environment. His 14 books of poetry include Jaguar Skies, Dark Brown, Huge Dreams, Rebel Lions, Rain Mirror and Plum Stones. McClure famously read selections of his Ghost Tantra poetry series to the caged lions in the San Francisco Zoo. His work as a novelist includes the autobiographical The Mad Cub and The Adept.

On January 14, 1967, McClure read at the Human Be-In event in Golden Gate Park and later became an important member of the 1960s hippie counterculture. Barry Miles called him "the prince of the San Francisco scene".

McClure later courted controversy as a playwright with his play The Beard. The play tells of a fictional encounter between Billy the Kid and Jean Harlow and is a theatrical exploration of his "Meat Politics" theory, in which all human beings are "bags of meat".

McClure's other plays include Josephine The Mouse Singer and VKTMS. He had an 11-year run as playwright-in-residence with San Francisco's Magic Theatre, where his operetta "Minnie Mouse and the Tap-Dancing Buddha" had an extended run. He made two television documentaries, The Maze and September Blackberries, and was featured in several films, including Martin Scorsese's The Last Waltz (1978), where he recites from The Canterbury Tales; Norman Mailer's Beyond the Law (1968); and, most prominently, Peter Fonda's The Hired Hand (1971).

McClure was a close friend of the Doors' lead singer Jim Morrison and is generally acknowledged as responsible for promoting Morrison as a poet. McClure performed spoken word poetry concerts with Doors keyboardist Ray Manzarek until the latter's death in 2013; several albums of their work have been released. McClure also contributed the afterword to No One Here Gets Out Alive, Jerry Hopkins's and Danny Sugerman's seminal Doors biography. McClure released albums of his work with minimalist composer Terry Riley. His songs include "Mercedes Benz", popularized by Janis Joplin, and new songs performed by Riders on the Storm, a band consisting of Manzarek and Doors guitarist Robbie Krieger.

McClure's journalism has appeared in Rolling Stone, Vanity Fair, the Los Angeles Times and the San Francisco Chronicle. He received numerous awards, including a Guggenheim Fellowship, an Obie Award for Best Play, an NEA grant, the Alfred Jarry Award and a Rockefeller grant for playwriting. In addition, he was inducted into the San Francisco State University Alumni Hall of Fame in 2014. McClure remained active as a poet, essayist and playwright until his death and lived with his second wife, Amy, in the San Francisco Bay Area. He had a daughter from his first marriage to Joanna McClure.

== The Beard ==
The Beard is a notably controversial modern play that explores the nature of seduction and attraction, portraying an explosive confrontation between two legendary figures: Jean Harlow, the platinum blonde movie star, and Billy the Kid, the baby-faced outlaw with a hair trigger. They are attracted to each other, but their egos get in the way. She mocks his masculinity, and he tells her she is envious of his beauty. This battle diminishes as they realize that since they are alone together, they are free to shed their burdening facades and give in to what they are truly feeling. The torrent of their unleashed passions leads to a final scene of great controversy, as the play comes to a climax with an act of explicit sexual intimacy between the cowboy and the starlet.

McClure said that he was inspired to write the play by a vision that came to him of a poster advertising a boxing match between Jean Harlow and Billy the Kid. Before he began to write, he went to the printer that created boxing posters in San Francisco and had the poster of his vision printed up. Then, he said, "I put the poster up on fences, windows, and in liquor stores where boxing posters would be, and put one up behind my head in the room I worked in at the time, which overlooked the bridge and the ocean. I could feel the presence of Billy the Kid and Jean Harlow broadcasting from the beautiful poster to the back of my head out towards the ocean. They began enacting the play and I began typing it up. They'd say a few pages, I just typed it. I thought it was a nature poem about mammal sexuality and mammal love. It could have been a tantric ritual."

McClure happened to meet British playwright, Harold Pinter, who then gave words of support to the play, which helped it become noticed and gave courage to those who staged its first production in San Francisco in 1965.

It debuted at the Actor's Workshop Theatre in San Francisco on the December 18, 1965. A second performance followed at Bill Graham's Fillmore Auditorium on the July 24, 1966. With the Fillmore's high profile, the play attracted an audience of 700. After success at the Fillmore, the following month the play opened at The committee, a theatre nightclub in the North Beach area of the city, where it was hoped it would enjoy a lengthy run.

Now aware of the play's controversial elements, the San Francisco Police Department secretly tape-recorded the first two performances and secretly filmed the third performance. Having failed in their attempts to censor Allen Ginsberg's Howl, the performances of Lenny Bruce and the San Francisco Mime Troupe, the police department was intent on succeeding this time.

At the end of that third performance on August 8, 1966—only the fifth time the play had been performed in public—the San Francisco Police Department raided the venue and arrested actors Billie Dixon (Jean) and Richard Bright (Billy). Under Penal Code Section 647(a) the pair were initially charged with "obscenity", then "conspiracy to commit a felony" and ultimately with "lewd or dissolute conduct in a public place".

The American Civil Liberties Union took the case and represented the actors. Twelve days after the arrests, the play was performed at The Florence Schwimley Little Theatre, in Berkeley. The audience included more than a hundred ACLU-invited expert witnesses, including political activists, academics, writers and even members of the clergy. Seven members of the Berkeley Police Department and the District Attorney's office were also present. Five days later, the city of Berkeley brought its own charges of "lewd or dissolute conduct" against the play. It became a theatrical cause célèbre, until finally, after months of legal deliberation, Judge Joseph Karesh of the San Francisco Superior Court ruled that while the play did contain material of a troublesome nature, it was not appropriate to prosecute such work under the law. All the charges were dropped and the subsequent appeal lost.

Unable to perform in the San Francisco area, the play moved to Los Angeles, where the play's attempt at a run was disrupted by the arrest of both Dixon and Bright at curtain down of fourteen consecutive performances. McClure recalled, "The actor and the actress actually got two standing ovations, one at the end of the play and the second when the police hauled them out of the door and into the waiting wagon and took them off to book them."

The Beard eventually transferred to New York where at the 1967–1968 Obie Theatre Awards, it won Best Director and Best Actress. It has since played successfully all over the world and is a favorite with American university drama groups. The play has enjoyed particular success in London, having been produced there twice. In 1968, actor Rip Torn directed a notable production at The Royal Court Theatre and it has most recently been revived at a smaller venue, the Old Red Lion Theatre in 2006 under the direction of Nic Saunders with new music by Terry Riley. The play is out of print in both the US and UK. Saunders collaborated with McClure a second time in 2008 on the award-winning short film Curses and Sermons, which marked the first time McClure had authorized a filmed adaptation of one of his poems.

== California College of Arts and Crafts ==
McClure was a celebrated professor of poetry at the California College of Arts and Crafts (now the California College of the Arts), in Oakland, California, for many years.

== Death ==
McClure died of stroke-related complications on May 4, 2020, in Oakland, aged 87.

== Bibliography ==
- Passage (1956)
- For Artaud (1959)
- Hymns to St. Geryon and Other Poems (1959)
- The New Book/A Book of Torture (1961)
- Dark Brown (1961)
- Meat Science Essays (1963)
- The Blossom; or Billy the Kid (1964)
- Ghost Tantras (1964)
- The Beard (1965)
- Poisoned Wheat (1965)
- Unto Caesar (1965)
- Love Lion Book (1966)
- Freewheelin Frank (with Frank Reynolds) (1967)
- The Sermons of Jean Harlow and the Curses of Billy the Kid (1968)
- Hail Thee Who Play (1968)
- Muscled Apple Swift (1968)
- Little Odes and The Raptors (1969)
- The Surge (1969)
- Star (1970)
- The Mad Cub (1970)
- The Adept (1971)
- Gargoyle Cartoons (1971)
- The Mammals – includes The Feast, The Blossom; or, Billy the Kid, and Pillow (1972)
- The Book of Joanna (1973)
- Solstice Blossom (1973)
- The Grabbing of the Fairy (1973)
- Rare Angel (1974)
- A Fist-Full (1956–57) (1974)
- Gorf (1974)
- September Blackberries (1974)
- Jaguar Skies (1975)
- Antechamber & Other Poems (1978)
- Josephine: The Mouse Singer (1980)
- Scratching the Beat Surface (1982)
- Fragments of Perseus (1983)
- Specks (1985)
- Rebel Lions (1991)
- Lighting the Corners (1994)
- Three Poems - includes Dark Brown, Rare Angel, Dolphin Skull (1995)
- Huge Dreams (1999) (a reissue of A New Book/A Book of Torture and Star, repackaged in one volume)
- Rain Mirror (1999)
- Touching the Edge (1999)
- The Last American Valentine: Illustrated poems to seduce and destroy – Write Bloody Publishing anthology (2008)
- Mysteriosos and Other Poems (2010)
- Of Indigo and Saffron: New and Selected Poems (2011)
- Mephistos and Other Poems (City Lights Publishers, 2016) ISBN 9780872867284.
- Persian Pony (Ekstasis Editions, 2017).
- Mule Kick Blues, And Last Poems (City Lights Publishers, 2021 ISBN 9780872868144.

== Selected filmography ==
- Two (1965) – as himself
- Be In (1967) – as himself
- Beyond the Law (1968) – as actor
- The Hired Hand (1971) – as actor
- The Last Waltz (1978) – as himself
- The Source (1999) – as himself (documentary about The Beats)
- Love Her Madly (2002) – as himself
- The Third Mind (2006) – as himself
- Curses and Sermons (2008) – based on his work
