= Peppersauce Cave =

Cave in Pinal County, Arizona

Coordinates: 32°31′28″N 110°42′26″W

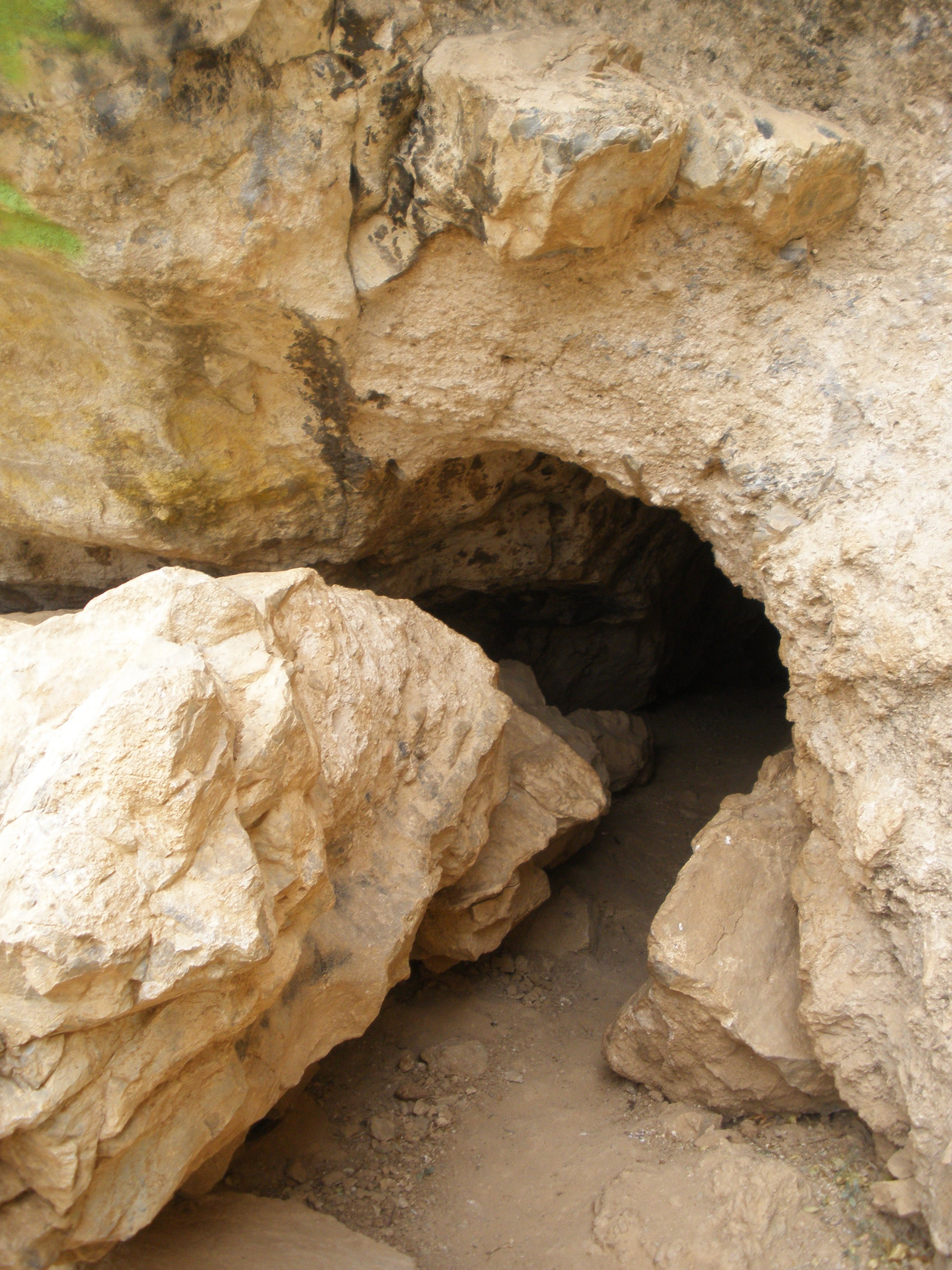
Peppersauce Cave entrance

Peppersauce Cave is a limestone cave found in the Santa Catalina Mountains approximately ten miles south of Oracle, Arizona. Peppersauce is frequented by about 23,000 visitors every year and contains approximately one mile of mapped passages.

== Publicity ==
Peppersauce was initially made known to the local public in February 1948 by way of an article published in Desert Magazine. An article about the cave was later featured in a 1951 issue of National Geographic Magazine which showed photos of a scientist breaking off and removing a large stalactite for purposes of further study.

The cave has always been and continues to be completely open to the public. There is no guided tour, no parking lot (although enough room exists to park on the side of the road), and the only official sign is not visible from the road. The sign also displays a map of about half the accessible area of the cave, specifically, from the entrance to the Big Room.

== Features ==
Inside is reliably humid and 70 °F (21 °C), but rainfall and snowmelt can dramatically affect moisture in mud and lake height, sometimes even flooding up to the "three fissures" near the entrance. However, the lakes stay at a constant level most of the year.

The room with the main lake is made accessible from the Big Room by a 15 feet (4.6 m) metal ladder. Without this, spelunkers would otherwise need to bring ropes to rappel anywhere past the Big Room. A similar metal ladder at the other end of the Big Room leads into the second half of cave.

Immediately after the second ladder is "the rabbit hole" or "birthing canal" (named for its constant moisture and the necessity to go down head-first). The first major feature is the Slide, a very smooth, high wall that is angled just enough to slide down. The danger is that it does not smoothly slope into the floor, forcing riders to land on their feet at a run.

The Signing Room is a nexus of many connected tunnels beyond the Big Room, and is a common resting point. It has a dirt floor and low, angled rock ceiling, easily reachable and consequently covered in signatures, contributing to the room's name. The room also typically has one or more notebooks and pens, free to fill with writing and messages.

== Vandalism ==
The cave has been subject to vandalism and heavy littering for over fifty years. In 2001, the Peppersauce Cave Conservation Project (PCCP) was established upon the discovery of E. coli and coliform within the cave's lakes. The initiative is funded by the Arizona Department of Environmental Quality (ADEQ) and is aided by volunteers who work to keep the cave clean. A sampling conducted in January 2003 indicated that no harmful bacteria were present in the water. The group was also highly successful in removing graffiti, though the cave continues to be heavily subjected to vandalism.
