= Robert D. Cocke =

American painter (born 1950)

- Born: 1950 (age 75–76); Salzburg, Austria
- Education: University of Iowa, University of Arizona
- Known for: Painting, landscape art, figurative art
- Spouse: Gayle J. Novak (1951–1998)
- Partner: Jane Kirkeby
- Awards: National Endowment for the Arts, Western States Arts Federation, Ford Foundation, Arizona Commission on the Arts

Robert D. Cocke, Rendezvous, oil on canvas, 48" x 48", 2016.

Robert D. Cocke (born 1950) is an American painter based in Arizona, known for enigmatic invented landscapes and still lifes. He emerged in the 1980s, producing expressionistic figurative paintings with a socio-critical dimension that drew on Chicago Imagism, Funk art and surrealism. In the 1990s, he turned to unpopulated, panoramic vistas combining classical painting technique and surreal features, which critics have described as hyperreal, hallucinatory and otherworldly. Curator Julie Sasse has written that despite dramatic changes in style and subject matter, his work has asserted "a consistent desire to address not only human relationships, but also the relationships between humankind and the natural world."

Cocke has exhibited at the Tucson Museum of Art, Brooklyn Museum and San Antonio Museum of Art, and his work belongs to the public collections of the Smithsonian American Art Museum, Crocker Art Museum and Phoenix Art Museum, among others. He has been recognized with awards from institutions including the National Endowment for the Arts, Western States Arts Federation and Ford Foundation. Cocke lives in Oracle, Arizona with his partner, Jane Kirkeby.

== Life and career ==
Cocke was born in 1950 to James and Marjorie Cocke, Americans living in Salzburg, Austria during James's service as a lieutenant colonel in the U.S. Army. In 1960, the family settled in Tucson, Arizona. He studied art at the University of Arizona (BFA, 1972), before attending the University of Iowa, where he earned an MA in studio art in 1974 and an MFA in 1975. His early influences included René Magritte, Giorgio de Chirico, Imagism, and Bay Area Funk artists Robert Arneson and William T. Wiley. Soon after graduating he began a teaching career at Dakota State College and Northwest Missouri State University. In 1983, he moved back to Arizona for a professor position at Arizona State University, where he taught until retiring in 2005.

Cocke's work began to receive wide recognition in the 1980s, through several surveys, including the traveling "Third Western States Exhibition" (1986–8; Brooklyn Museum, San Jose Museum of Art), "Visions of America, 1787-1987" (ACA Galleries, New York), "Evidence: Contemporary Narrative Painters of the Southwest" (San Antonio Museum of Art, 1989), and Arizona Biennial (1986, 1988). Later in his career he appeared in "Transcending Earth and Sky" (San Diego State University, 2000), "Big City: Cityscapes and Urban Life from the Collection" (Phoenix Art Museum, 2006), and "Trouble in Paradise" (Tucson Museum of Art, 2009).

Robert D. Cocke, Miami, oil on canvas, 36" x 42", 1984.

== Work and reception ==
Critic Peter Frank wrote that Cocke emerged in the 1980s as a "peculiarly Western-style funk-expressionist painter" whose imagery was by turns "exuberant and nightmarish … and marked by an odd, contemplative sense of groundedness." Writers identified this early work by its emotionally charged, underground-comic painting style, harsh palettes (sinister blues, dark purples and acid hues), strident tonal qualities and enigmatic space, while relating its disquieting vision of contemporary environmental and moral collapse to the art of Philip Guston and William Wiley.

In works such as Miami (1984) or Inheritance (1985), Cocke depicted eerie, surreal scenarios of urban neglect and paradises lost. Their Bosch-like compositions were packed with repressed and corrupted figures, architectonic forms, apocalyptic fires, acrid smoke, and shattered remnants of science and culture that suggested wide-ranging allusions and metaphors. Discussing later works, such as The Quest for Knowledge (1989), Robert Cauthorn identified a more introspective, spiritual dimension amid the desolation: "Cocke's work is a study in planes of existence: virtue vs. corruption, the natural world vs. technology … The battleground for these factions is our spirit."

Robert D. Cocke, Once Upon a Time, oil on canvas, 26" x 26", 2008.

In the mid-1990s, Cocke turned from the figure and social commentary to serene landscapes and panoramic vistas painted from memory rather than observation, which explored the genre's evocative possibilities in a pure manner. Influenced by the Hudson River School, these paintings revealed a "dual desire to mirror nature and depart from it," combining a precision and clarity that critics likened to classical painters Jan van Eyck and Pieter Breughel and an unsettling Edenic quality reminiscent of 19th-century Luminism. Their invented scenes both distilled Cocke's experience and wonder at the Arizona wilderness and evoked parallel worlds through eerie plant life and geological features, curious clouds suggesting creatures and other forms, unnatural patterns and palettes that edged the work toward surrealism and more mysterious realities. Robert L. Pincus wrote, "There's something covertly mystical about Cocke's desert images. Clouds form patterns that verge on language … His landscapes are visionary, in a restrained sort of way."

In later exhibitions, such as "Near and Far" (Tasende Gallery, 2005), Cocke demonstrated a complex use of space and scale, combining grand vistas and intimate details in small (5" tall by two feet) paintings that reviews noted for a surprisingly operatic and expansive effect despite their size. During this period, Cocke reintroduced signs of human presence into his landscapes—usually unconventional objects (antique toys, stones, seedpods, keys, penny banks, lipsticks) in enigmatic, stream-of-conscious arrangements that sat in tension with their natural settings. In these paintings, such as Once Upon a Time (2008), he sought to evoke non-explicit associations, relationships and narratives in viewers, akin to poetry. His later paintings (e.g., Rendezvous, 2016) often depict miniature worlds or forlorn tableaus set against distant cities, landscapes or figures, which critics suggested evoke tender sadness or resignation, relieved by the freedom conveyed by vast skies.

== Public collections and awards ==
Cocke's work belongs to the public collections of the Smithsonian American Art Museum, Cedar Rapids Museum of Art, Crocker Art Museum, Phoenix Art Museum, South Dakota Memorial Art Center, University of Iowa Stanley Museum of Art, and Tucson Museum of Art, among others. He has received awards and grants from the Ford Foundation, Arizona Commission on the Arts, Phoenix Art Museum/The Contemporary Forum, and National Endowment for the Arts/Western States Arts Federation, and juried awards from the Contemporary Arts Center, Mesa and Yuma Art Center, among others.
