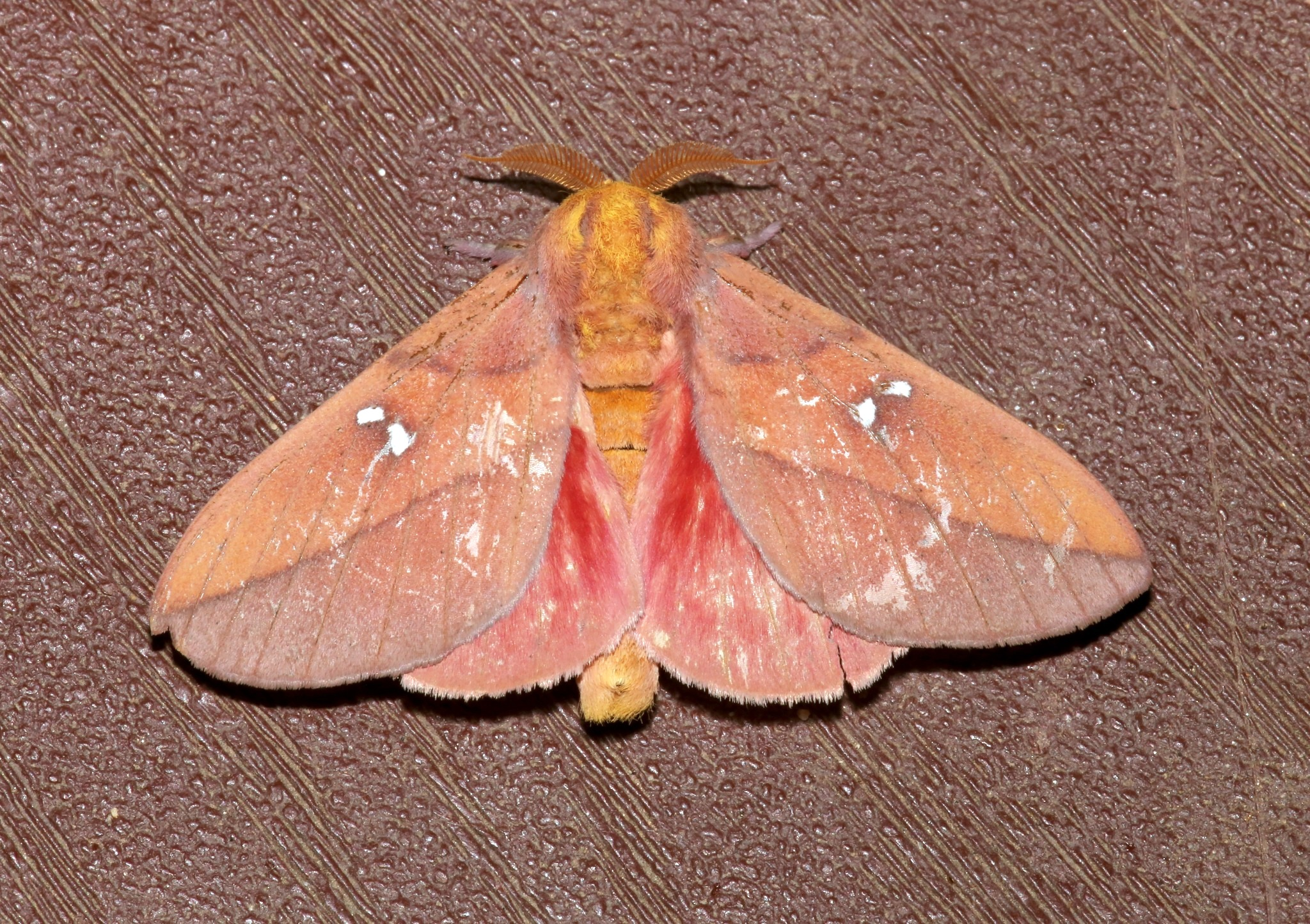

Scientific classification
- Kingdom: Animalia
- Phylum: Arthropoda
- Clade: Pancrustacea
- Class: Insecta
- Order: Lepidoptera
- Family: Saturniidae
- Genus: Syssphinx
- Species: S. montana

Binomial name
- Syssphinx montana (Packard, 1905)

Synonyms
- Adelocephala montana Packard, 1905; Sphingicampa montana

= Syssphinx montana =

Species of moth

Syssphinx montana is a moth of the family Saturniidae. It is found in Mexico and (rarely) in southeastern Arizona.

The wingspan is 62–82 millimetres (2.4–3.2 in). The males are smaller than the females. Adults are on wing from mid-July to early August. Adults do not feed.

The larvae feed on Haematoxylon brasalita, Cassia emarginata, Acacia farnesiana, Gleditsia triacanthos and Robinia pseudoacacia.
