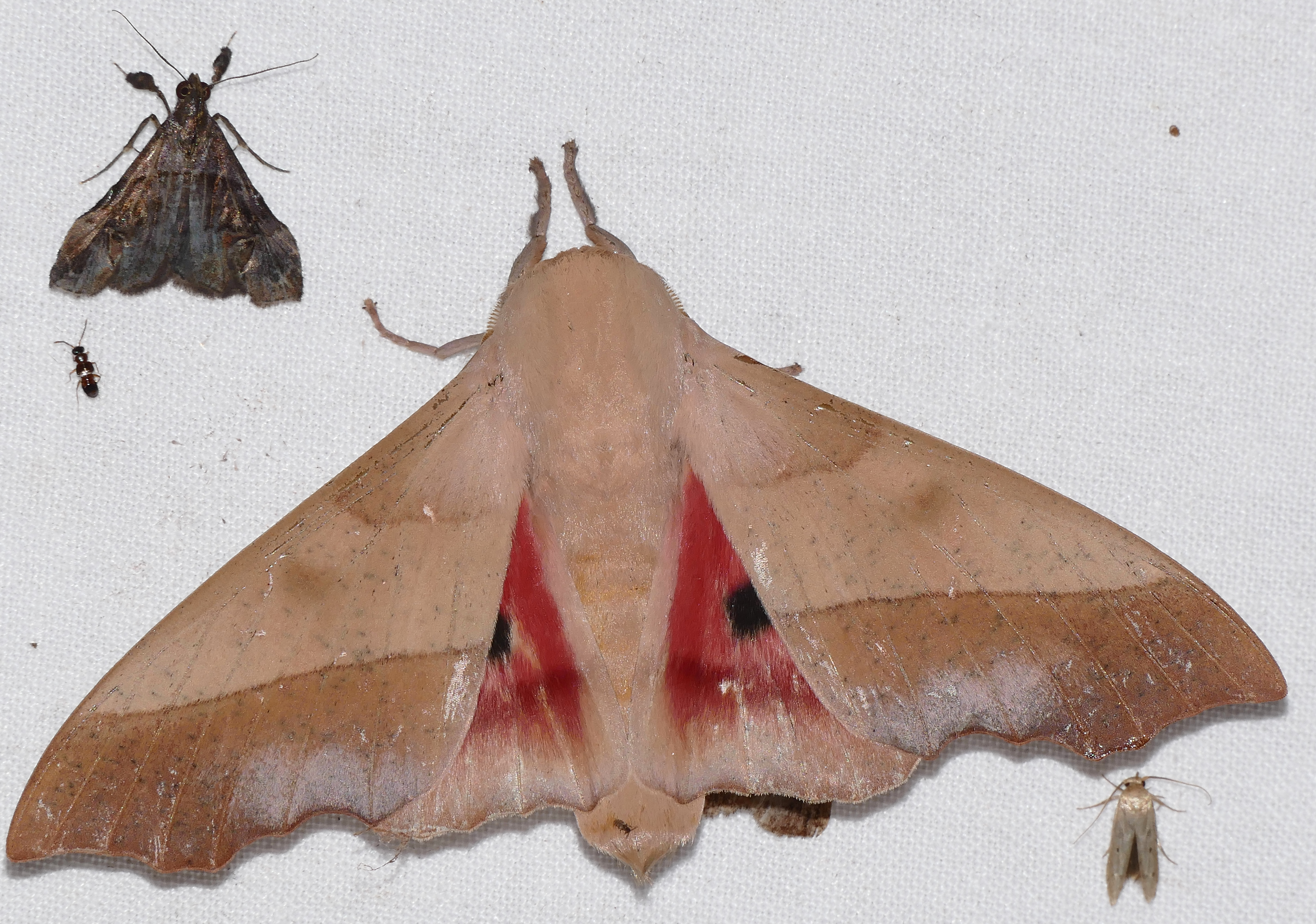
- Syssphinx molina

Scientific classification
- Domain: Eukaryota
- Kingdom: Animalia
- Phylum: Arthropoda
- Class: Insecta
- Order: Lepidoptera
- Family: Saturniidae
- Subfamily: Ceratocampinae
- Genus: Syssphinx (Hübner, 1819)

Synonyms
- Sphingicampa Walsh, 1864; Psephopaectes Grote & Robinson, 1867; Ceroderes Boisduval, 1872; Bouvierina Michener, 1949

= Syssphinx =

Genus of moths

Syssphinx is a genus of moths of the family Saturniidae. The genus was erected by Jacob Hübner in 1819.

== Species ==
- Syssphinx albolineata (Grote & Robinson, 1866) (Texas, Mexico)
- Syssphinx amena (Travassos, 1941) (Ecuador)
- Syssphinx bicolor (Harris, 1841) (northern and eastern United States, Mexico)
- Syssphinx bidens (W. Rothschild, 1907) (Ecuador)
- Syssphinx bisecta (Lintner, 1879) (northern and eastern United States)
- Syssphinx blanchardi (Ferguson, 1971) (Texas)
- Syssphinx chocoensis (Lemaire, 1988)
- Syssphinx colla (Dyar, 1907) (Mexico)
- Syssphinx colloida (Dyar, 1925) (Mexico)
- Syssphinx digueti (Bouvier, 1929) (Mexico)
- Syssphinx erubescens (Boisduval, 1872)
- Syssphinx gadouae (Lemaire, 1971)
- Syssphinx gomezi (Lemaire, 1984) (Mexico)
- Syssphinx heiligbrodti (Harvey, 1877) (Texas, Mexico)
- Syssphinx hubbardi (Dyar, 1903) (Texas, New Mexico, Arizona, California)
- Syssphinx jasonoides (Lemaire, 1971)
- Syssphinx malinalcoensis (Lemaire, 1975) (Mexico)
- Syssphinx mexicana (Boisduval, 1872) (Mexico)
- Syssphinx modena (Dyar, 1913) (Mexico)
- Syssphinx molina (Cramer, 1780) (Mexico, Guatemala, Suriname)
- Syssphinx montana (Packard, 1905) (Arizona, Mexico)
- Syssphinx ocellata (W. Rothschild, 1907)
- Syssphinx pescadori (Lemaire, 1988) (Mexico)
- Syssphinx quadrilineata (Grote & Robinson, 1867) (Mexico to Panama, Venezuela, Guatemala, Ecuador)
- Syssphinx raspa (Boisduval, 1872) (Arizona, Mexico)
- Syssphinx smithi (Druce, 1904)
- Syssphinx thiaucourti (Lemaire, 1975)
- Syssphinx xanthina (Lemaire, 1984) (Guatemala)
- Syssphinx yucatana (Druce, 1904) (Mexico)
