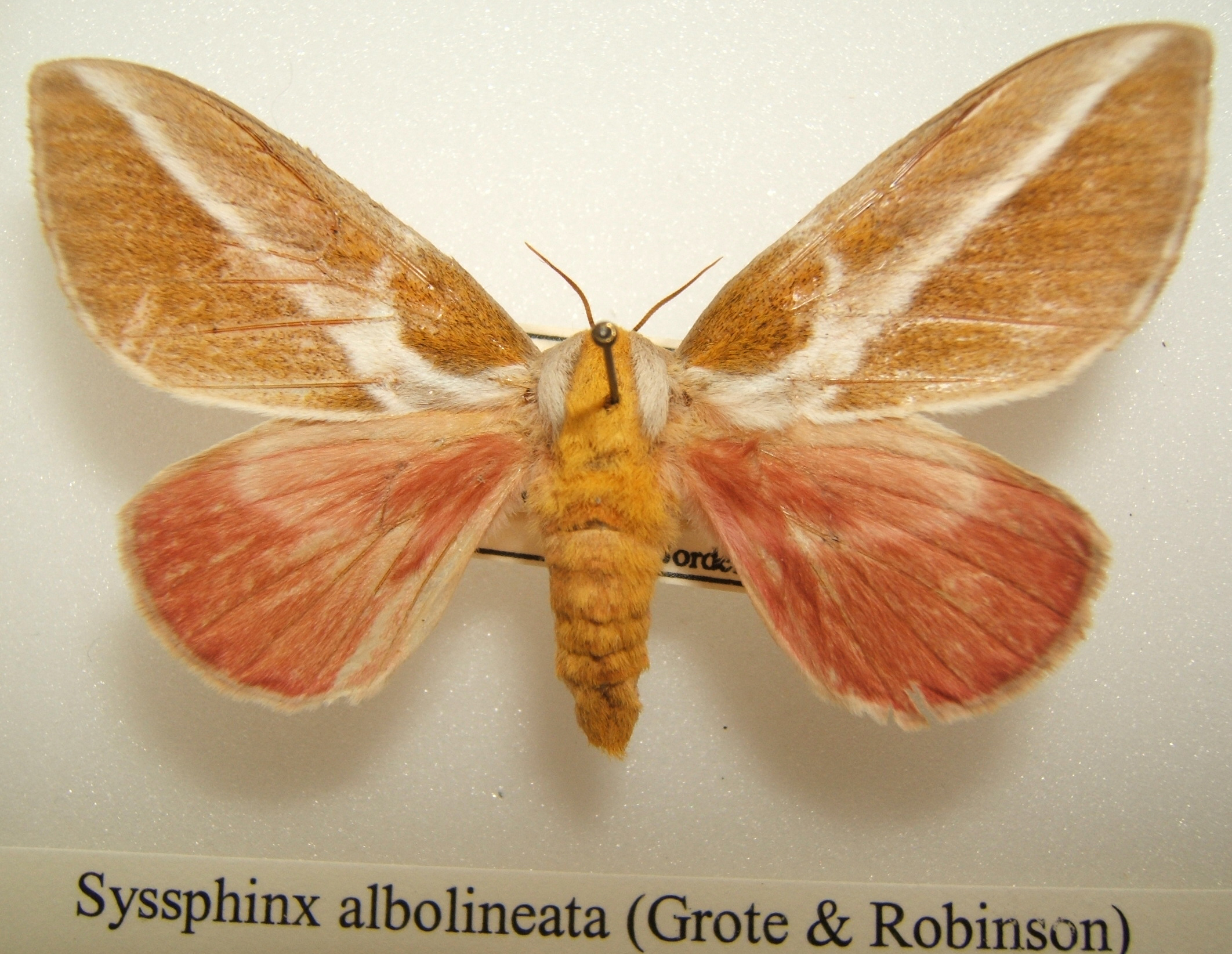
- Syssphinx albolineata

Scientific classification
- Kingdom: Animalia
- Phylum: Arthropoda
- Class: Insecta
- Order: Lepidoptera
- Family: Saturniidae
- Genus: Syssphinx
- Species: S. albolineata

Binomial name
- Syssphinx albolineata Grote & Robinson, 1866

= Syssphinx albolineata =

Species of moth

Syssphinx albolineata is a species of giant silkworm moth in the family Saturniidae. It is found in Central America and North America.
