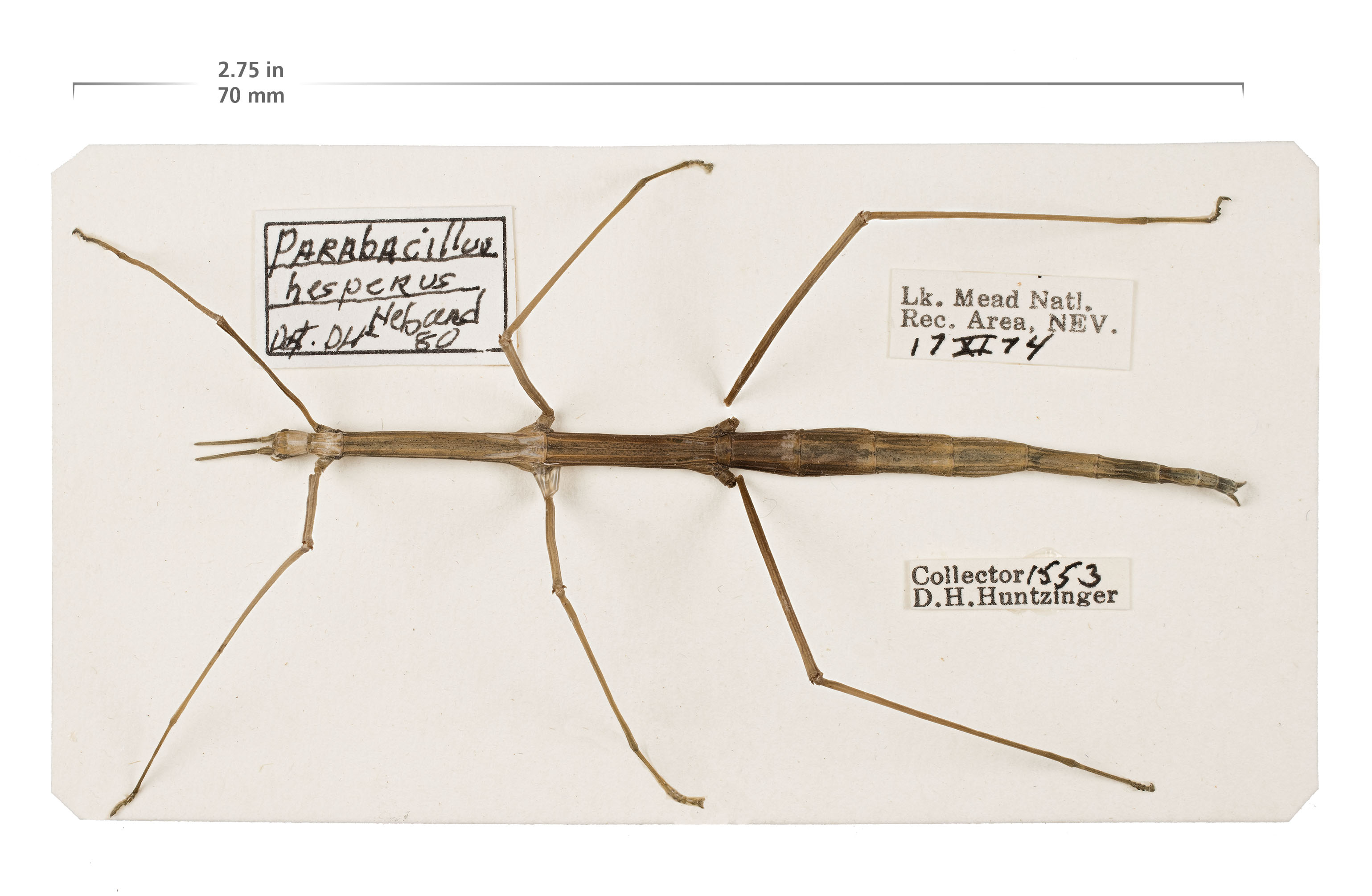
- Parabacillus hesperus

Scientific classification
- Domain: Eukaryota
- Kingdom: Animalia
- Phylum: Arthropoda
- Class: Insecta
- Order: Phasmatodea
- Family: Heteronemiidae
- Genus: Parabacillus; Caudell, 1903

= Parabacillus =

Genus of insects

Parabacillus is a genus of short-horn walkingsticks in the family Heteronemiidae. There are at least three described species in Parabacillus.

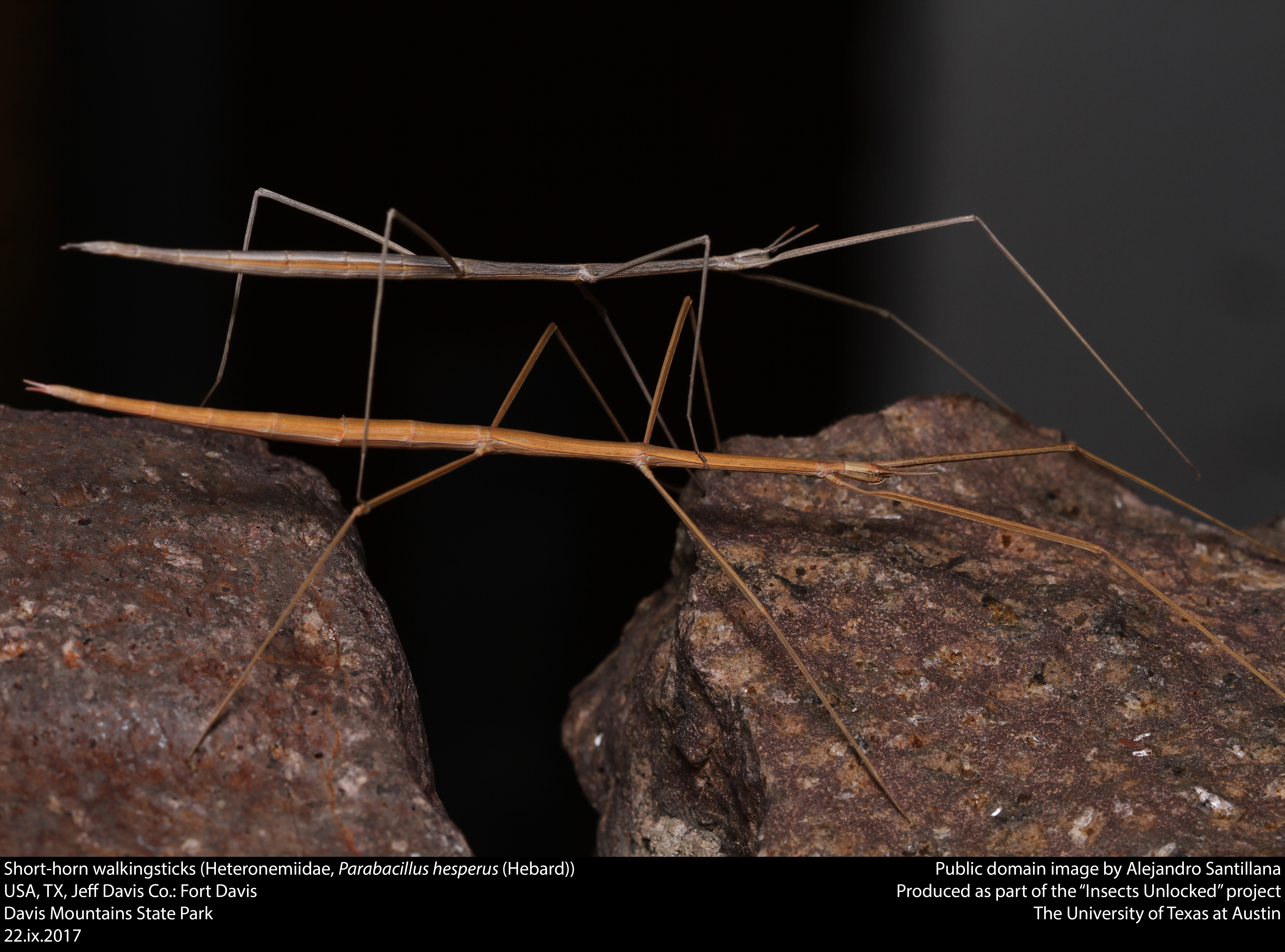
Parabacillus hesperus

== Species ==
These three species belong to the genus Parabacillus:

- Parabacillus coloradus (Scudder, 1893) (Colorado short-horn walkingstick)
- Parabacillus hesperus Hebard, 1934 (western short-horn walkingstick)
- Parabacillus palmeri (Caudell, 1903)
