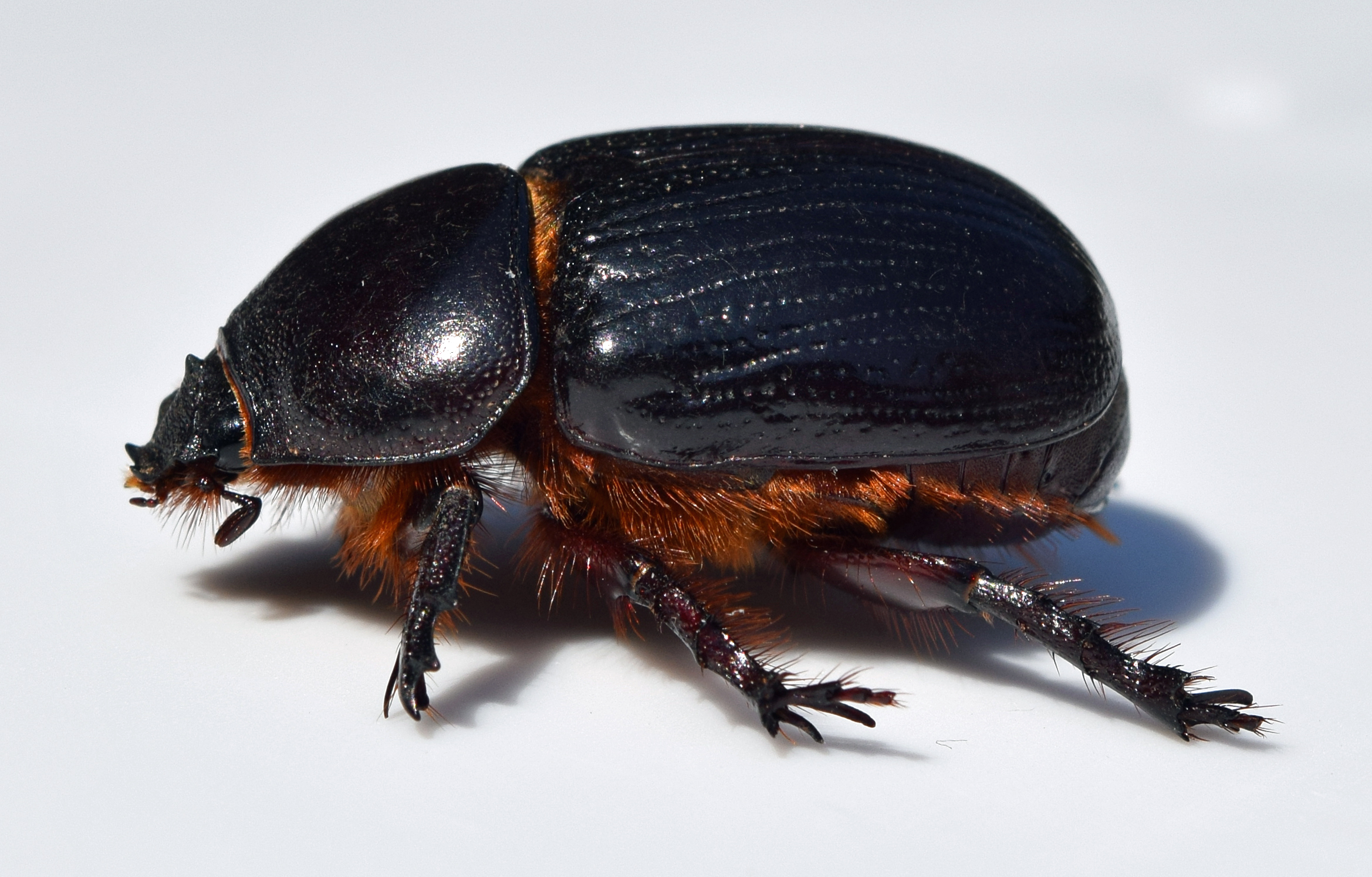
- Xyloryctes jamaicensis

Scientific classification
- Kingdom: Animalia
- Phylum: Arthropoda
- Class: Insecta
- Order: Coleoptera
- Suborder: Polyphaga
- Infraorder: Scarabaeiformia
- Family: Scarabaeidae
- Tribe: Oryctini
- Genus: Xyloryctes; Hope, 1837

= Xyloryctes =

Genus of beetles

Xyloryctes is a genus of rhinoceros beetles in the family Scarabaeidae. There are about 13 described species in Xyloryctes.

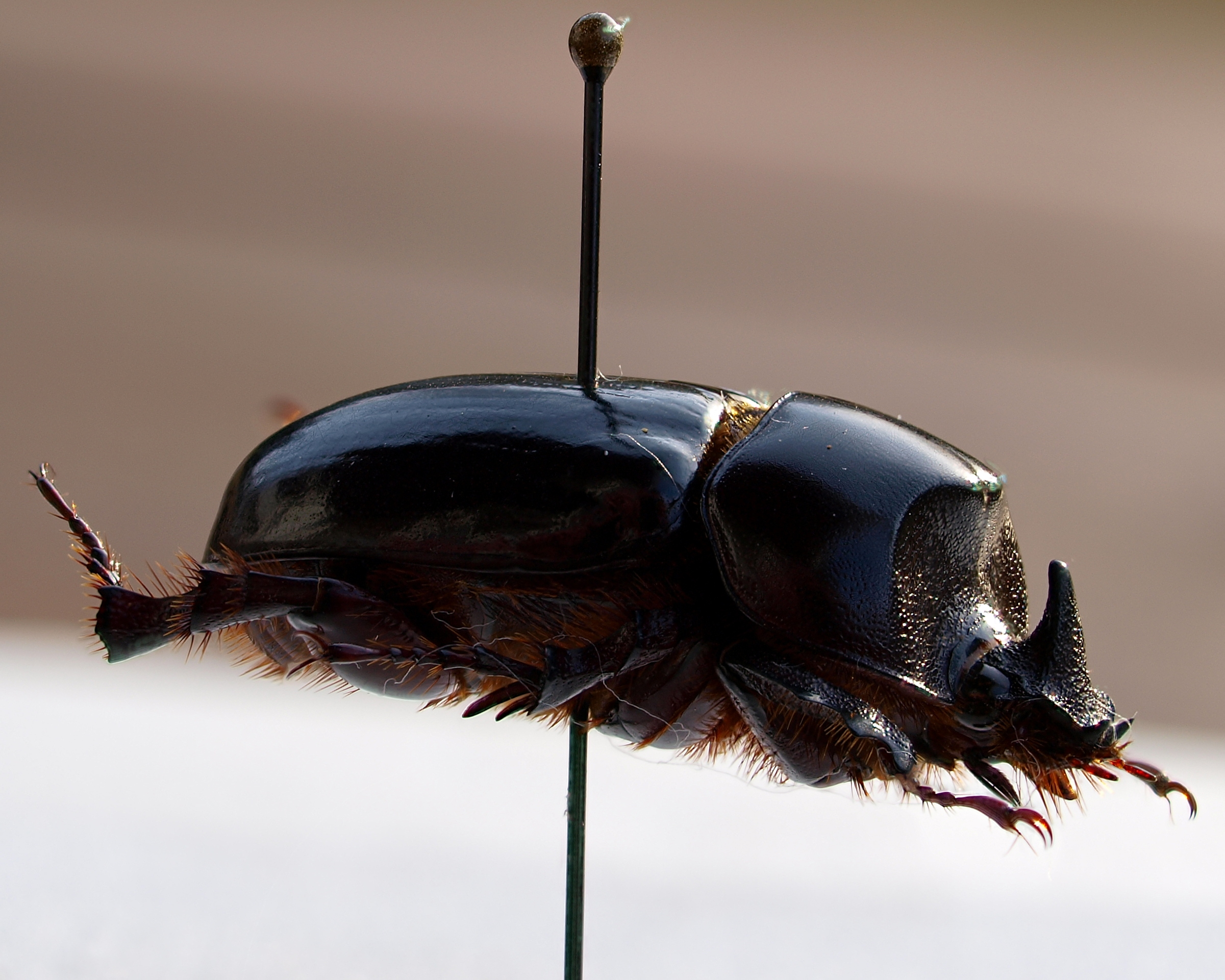
Xyloryctes jamaicensis

== Species ==
These 13 species belong to the genus Xyloryctes:

- Xyloryctes corniger Bates, 1888
- Xyloryctes ensifer Bates, 1888
- Xyloryctes faunus Casey, 1895
- Xyloryctes furcatus Burmeister, 1847
- Xyloryctes guatemalensis Bitar & Delgado, 2009
- Xyloryctes howdenorum Delgado & Najera, 1992
- Xyloryctes jamaicensis (Drury, 1773) (rhinoceros beetle)
- Xyloryctes lobicollis Bates, 1888
- Xyloryctes orientalis Bitar & Morón, 2014
- Xyloryctes splendidus Prell, 1914
- Xyloryctes telephus Burmeister, 1847
- Xyloryctes teuthras Bates, 1888
- Xyloryctes thestalus BATES, 1888
