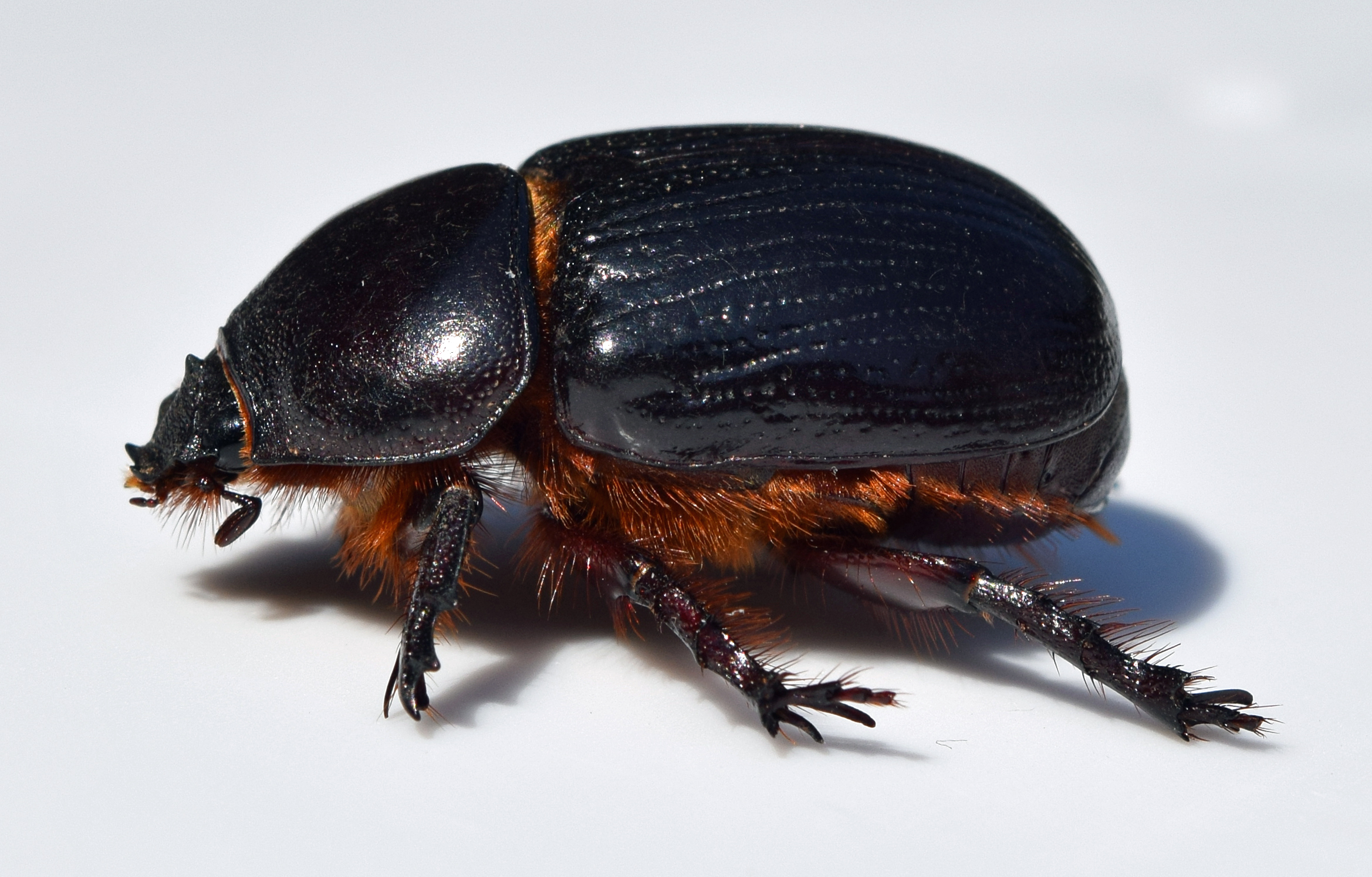

Scientific classification
- Domain: Eukaryota
- Kingdom: Animalia
- Phylum: Arthropoda
- Class: Insecta
- Order: Coleoptera
- Suborder: Polyphaga
- Infraorder: Scarabaeiformia
- Family: Scarabaeidae
- Genus: Xyloryctes
- Species: X. jamaicensis

Binomial name
- Xyloryctes jamaicensis (Drury, 1773)

Synonyms
- Scarabaeus americanus Palisot de Beauvois, 1807; Scarabaeus satyrus Fabricius, 1775; Xyloryctes faunus Casey, 1895; Xyloryctes hebes Casey, 1915; Xyloryctes lacustris Casey, 1915; Xyloryctes obsolescens Casey, 1915; Xyloryctes tenuicornutus Casey, 1915

= Xyloryctes jamaicensis =

Species of beetle

Xyloryctes jamaicensis, known generally as the rhinoceros beetle or unicorn beetle, is a species of rhinoceros beetle in the family Scarabaeidae. It is found in North America.

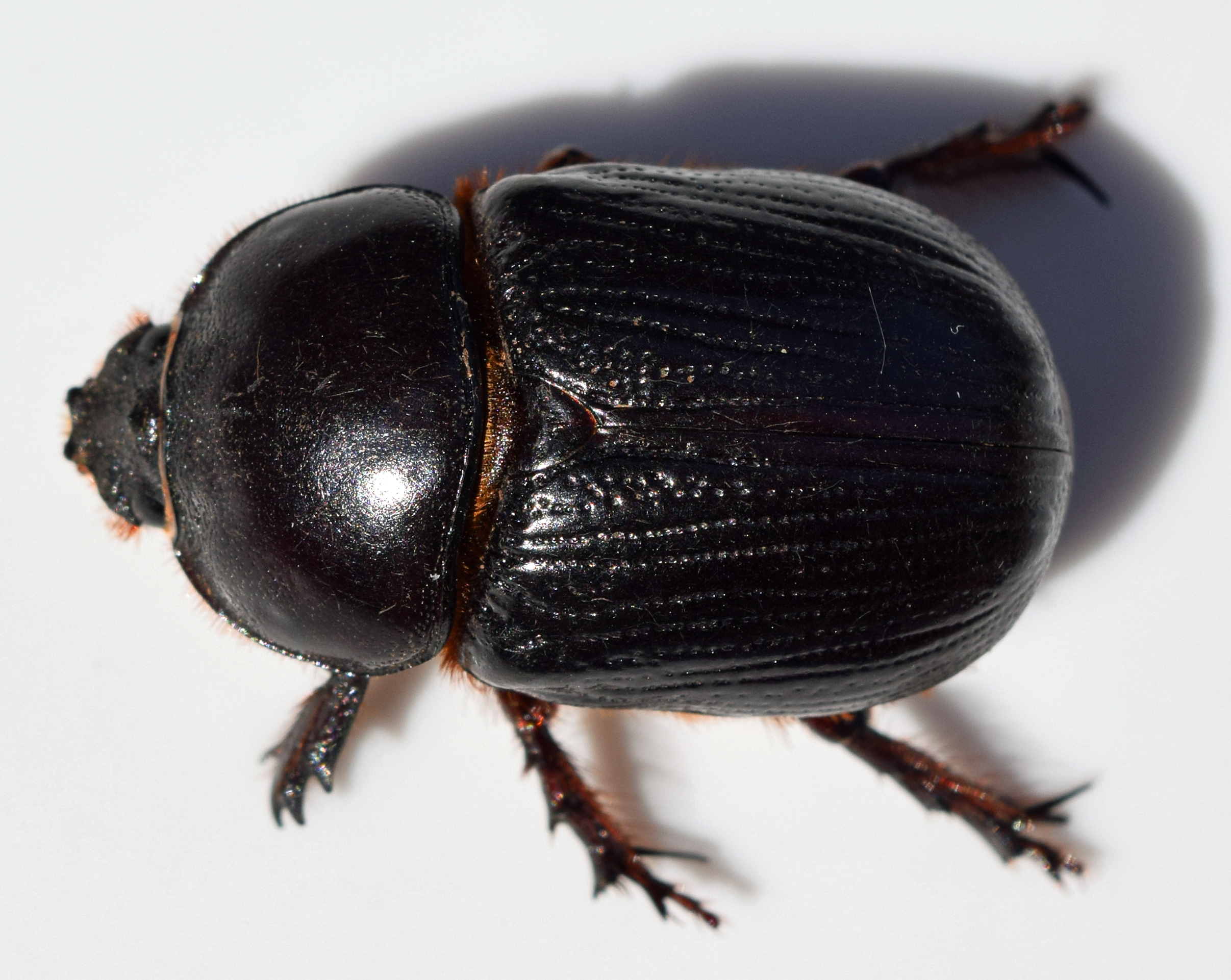
Rhinoceros beetle, Xyloryctes jamaicensis

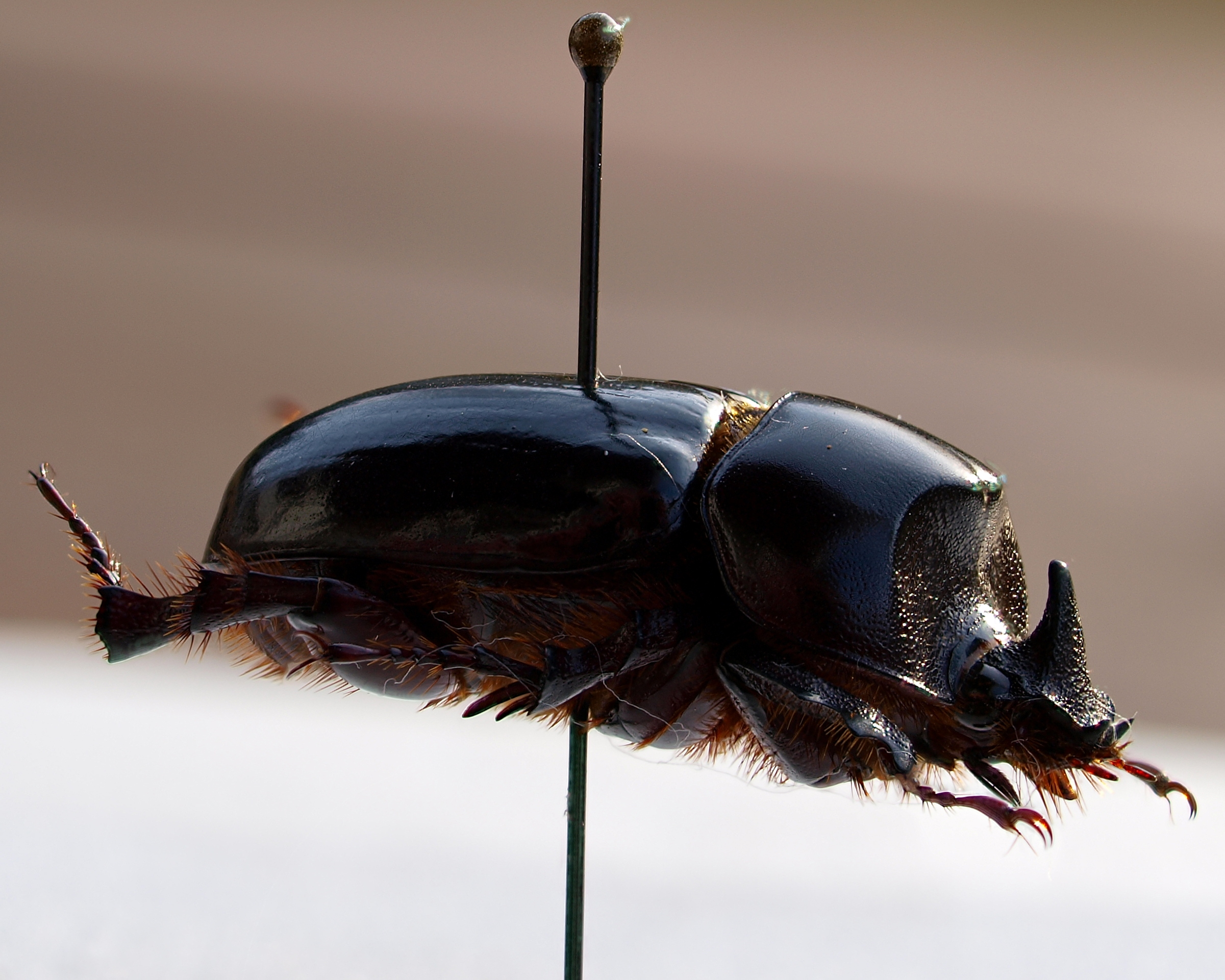
Rhinoceros beetle, Xyloryctes jamaicensis
