= Canuleius (insect) =

Scientific classification
- Kingdom: Animalia
- Phylum: Arthropoda
- Class: Insecta
- Order: Phasmatodea
- Family: Heteronemiidae
- Genus: Canuleius

Genus of insects

Canuleius is a genus of the order Phasmatodea in the family Heteronemiidae. There are at least 20 described species in Canuleius.

== Species ==
These 21 species belong to the genus Canuleius:

- Canuleius affinis Piza, 1936
- Canuleius bicornis (Thunberg, 1815)
- Canuleius bispinosus Piza, 1936
- Canuleius brevipes Piza, 1936
- Canuleius corallinus Piza, 1936
- Canuleius delicatulus Brancsik, 1898
- Canuleius euterpinus (Westwood, 1859)
- Canuleius fischeri Piza, 1936
- Canuleius grandis Piza, 1936
- Canuleius inermipes (Piza, 1944)
- Canuleius inermis Redtenbacher, 1906
- Canuleius ingenua (Brunner von Wattenwyl, 1907)
- Canuleius libidinosus (Piza, 1943)
- Canuleius metzi Redtenbacher, 1906
- Canuleius nudiceps Redtenbacher, 1906
- Canuleius pullus Redtenbacher, 1906
- Canuleius similis Redtenbacher, 1906
- Canuleius ubatubae (Piza, 1944)
- Canuleius vetus Piza, 1936
- Canuleius vigintiquatuorspinosus Redtenbacher, 1906
- Canuleius vigintispinosus Redtenbacher, 1906
