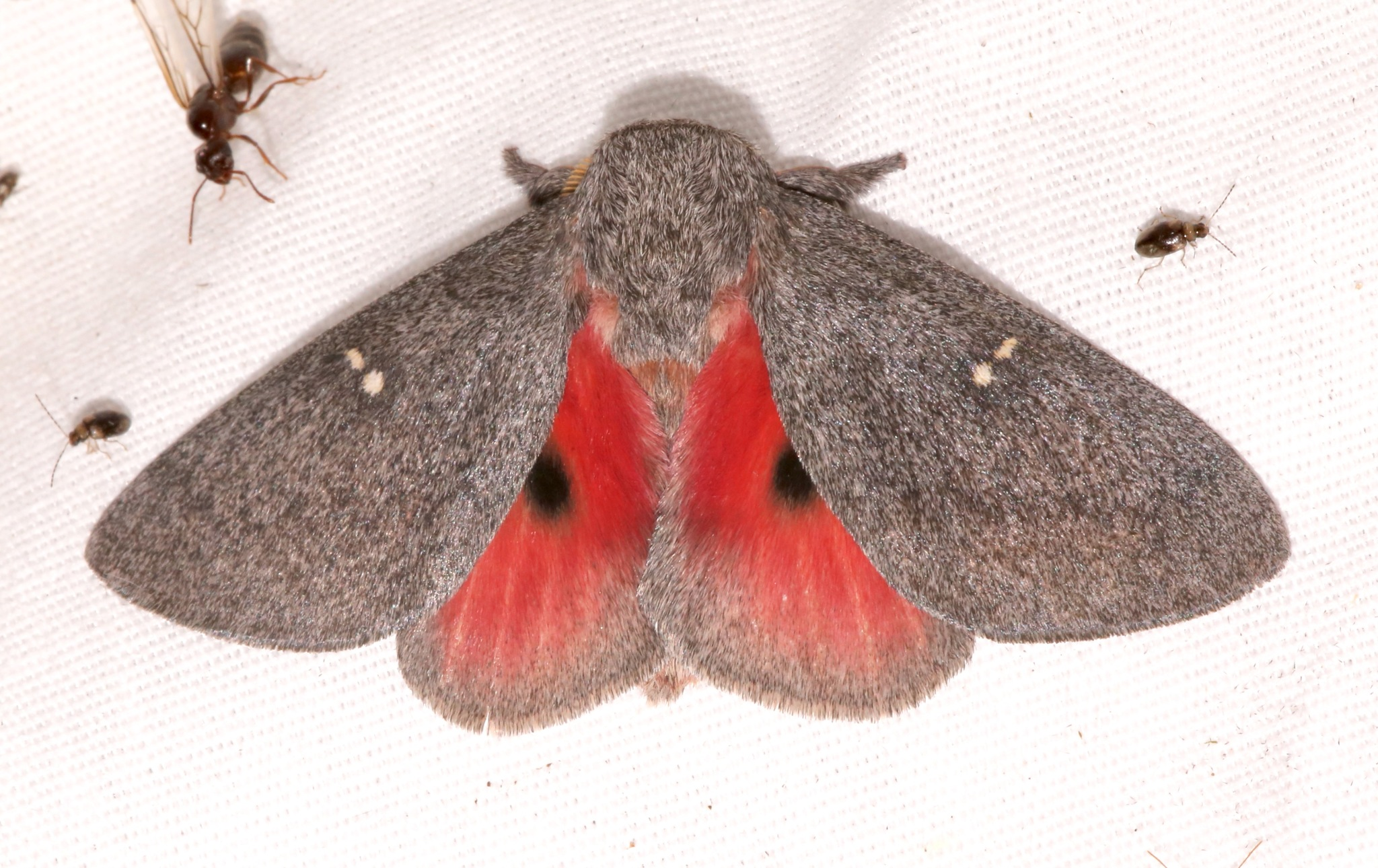

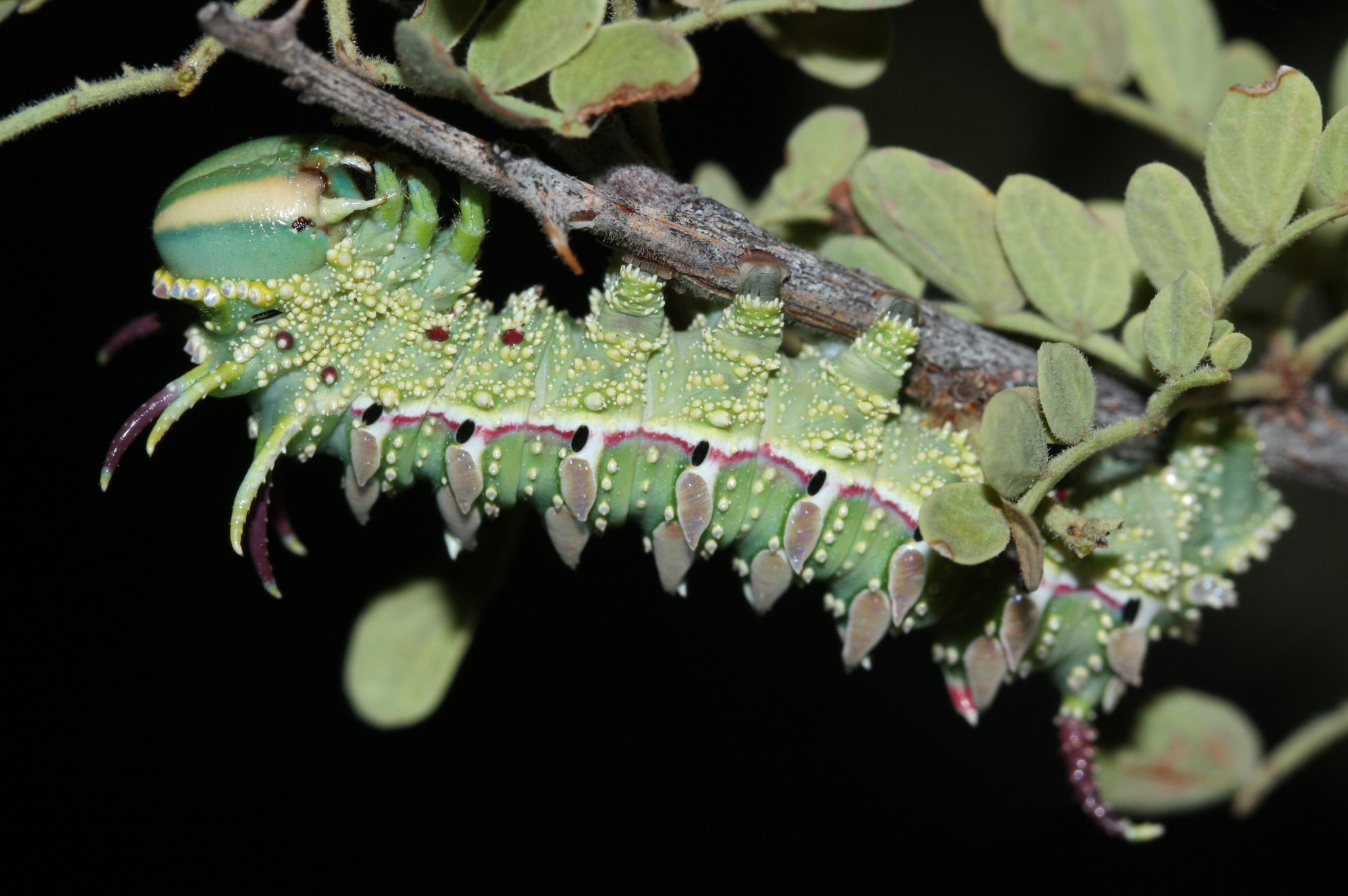
- Adult (top) and larva (bottom)

Scientific classification
- Kingdom: Animalia
- Phylum: Arthropoda
- Class: Insecta
- Order: Lepidoptera
- Family: Saturniidae
- Genus: Syssphinx
- Species: S. hubbardi

Binomial name
- Syssphinx hubbardi (Dyar, 1902)

Synonyms
- Sphingicampa hubbardi

= Syssphinx hubbardi =

Hubbard's silk moth

Syssphinx hubbardi, or Hubbard's silk moth, is a species of moth in the family Saturniidae. It is found in Mexico and the southern United States.

== Distribution ==
The species can be found in Texas, Arizona, New Mexico, and California. It is also found in the Sonoran Desert in Mexico.

== Ecology ==
The caterpillar is approximately 2.5 inches long, and green with many white dots. It also has a violet line that runs across its body. They commonly feed on Prosopis (mesquite), Acacia, and Cercidium microphyllum (palo verde).
