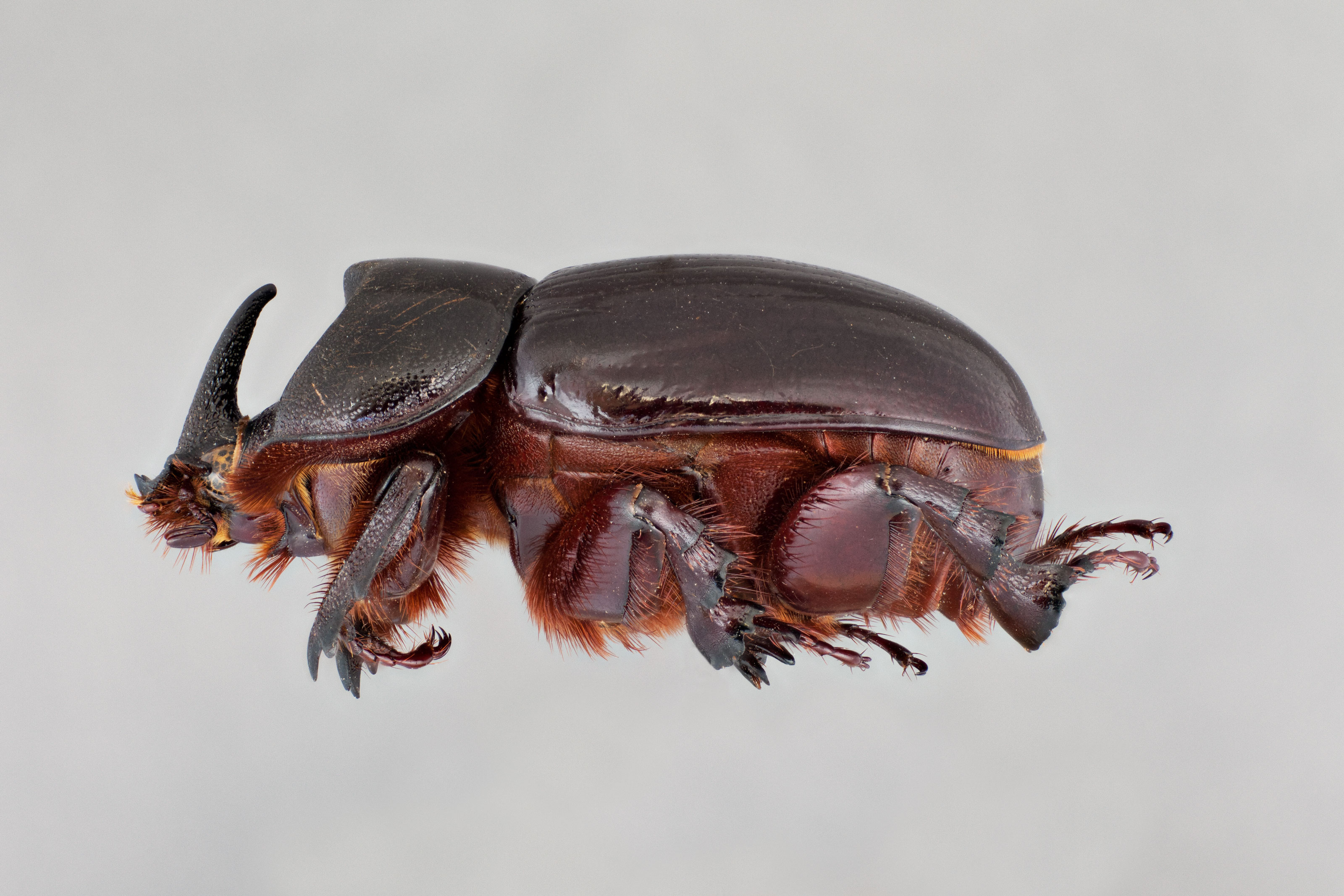

Scientific classification
- Domain: Eukaryota
- Kingdom: Animalia
- Phylum: Arthropoda
- Class: Insecta
- Order: Coleoptera
- Suborder: Polyphaga
- Infraorder: Scarabaeiformia
- Family: Scarabaeidae
- Genus: Xyloryctes
- Species: X. thestalus

Binomial name
- Xyloryctes thestalus BATES, 1888

= Xyloryctes thestalus =

Species of beetle

Xyloryctes thestalus is a species of rhinoceros beetle in the family Scarabaeidae.

== Subspecies ==
These two subspecies belong to the species Xyloryctes thestalus:

- Xyloryctes thestalus borealis Endrödi, 1975
- Xyloryctes thestalus thestalus Bates, 1888
