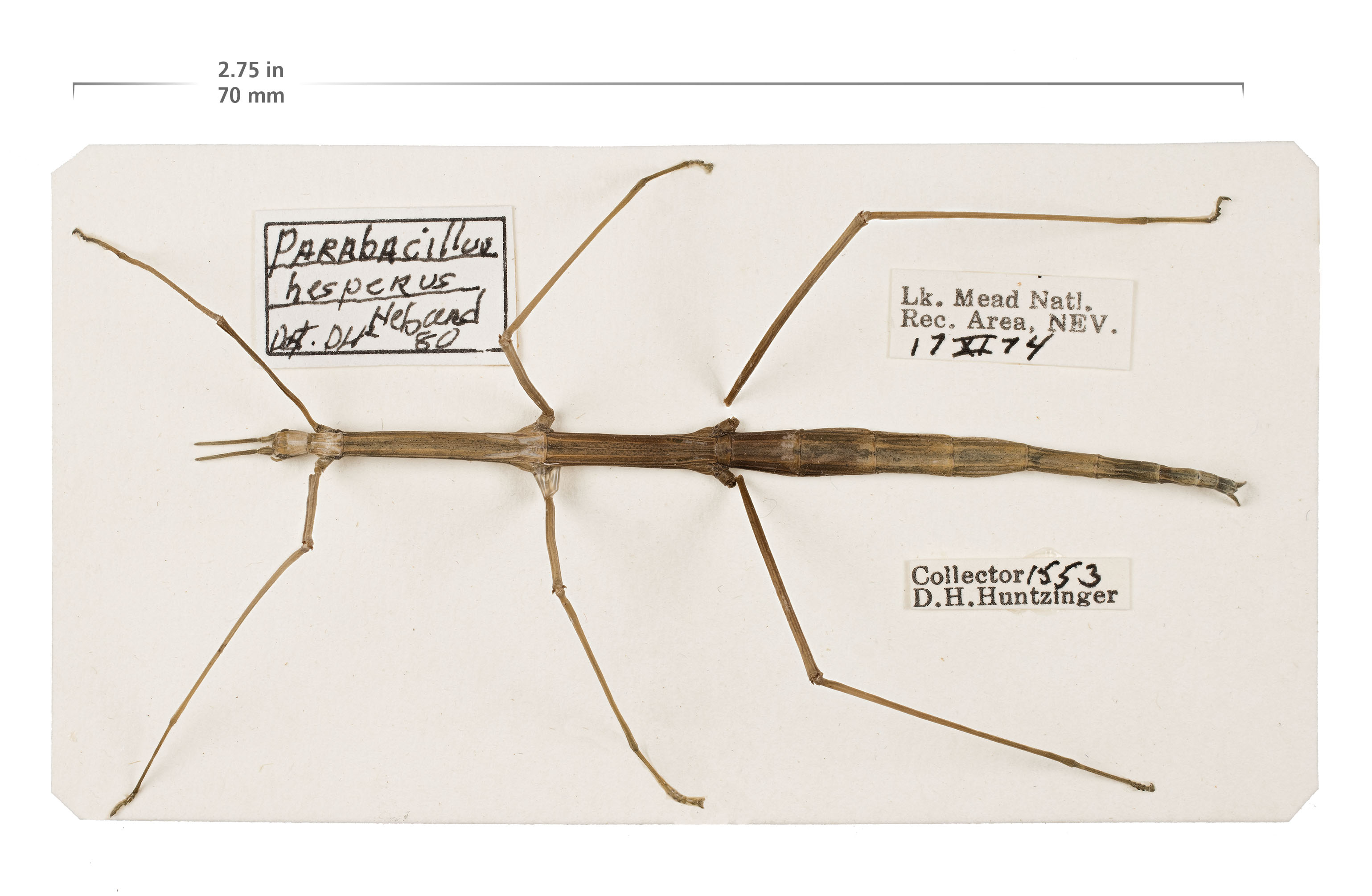
- Parabacillus hesperus

Scientific classification
- Domain: Eukaryota
- Kingdom: Animalia
- Phylum: Arthropoda
- Class: Insecta
- Order: Phasmatodea
- Superfamily: Pseudophasmatoidea
- Family: Heteronemiidae

= Heteronemiidae =

Family of insects

Heteronemiidae is a family of walkingsticks in the order Phasmatodea. There are about 14 genera and at least 80 described species in Heteronemiidae.

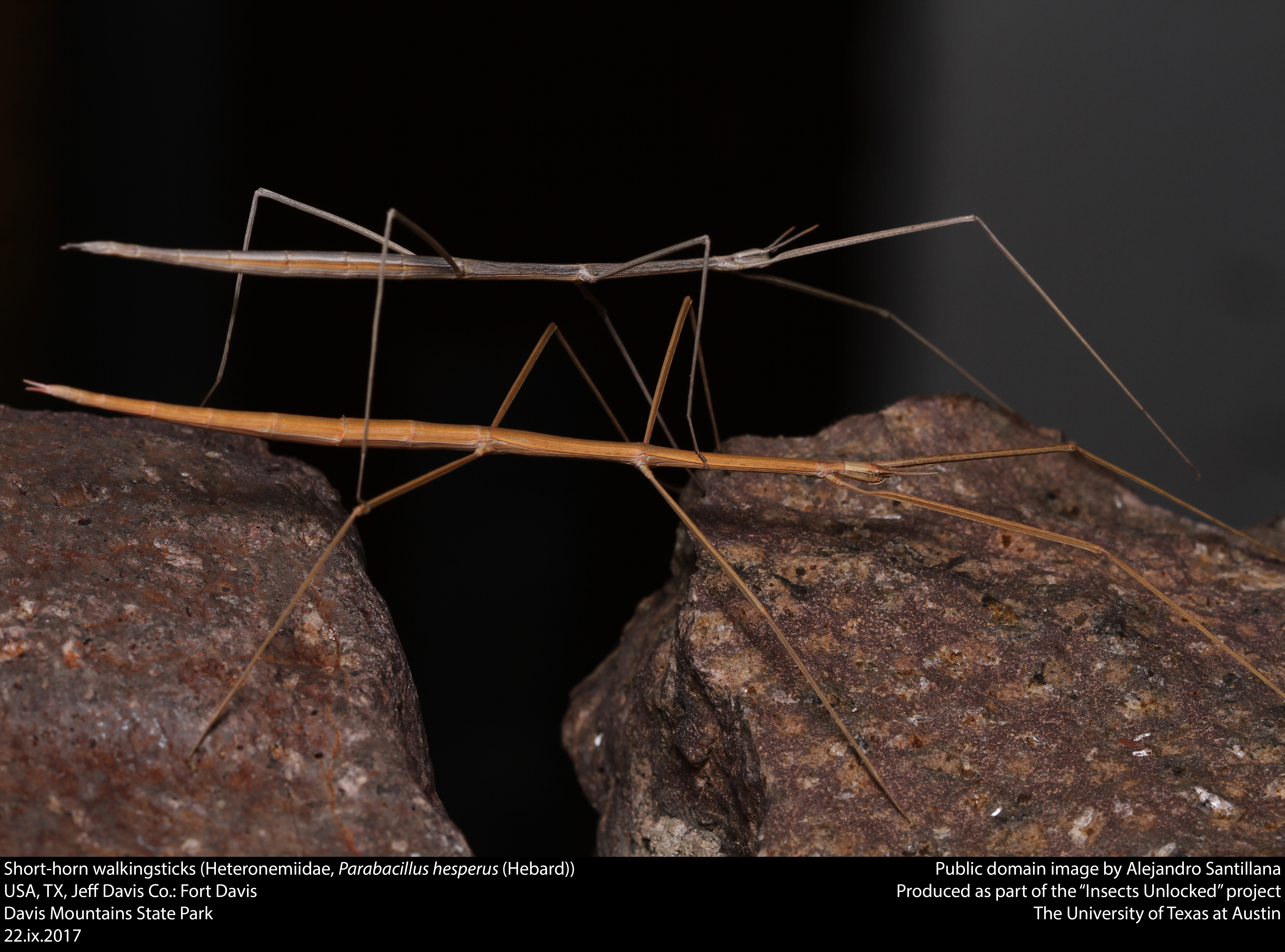
Parabacillus hesperus

== Genera ==
These 14 genera belong to the family Heteronemiidae:

- Canuleius
- Ceroys
- Heteronemia
- Minteronemia
- Parabacillus Caudell, 1903 (short-horn walkingsticks)
- Paraceroys
- Paraleptynia
- Paraxeropsis
- Pygirhynchus
- Spinonemia
- Splendidonemia
- Tersomia
- Xeropsis
- Xiphophasma
