= Thimble Peak =

Landform in Pima County, Arizona

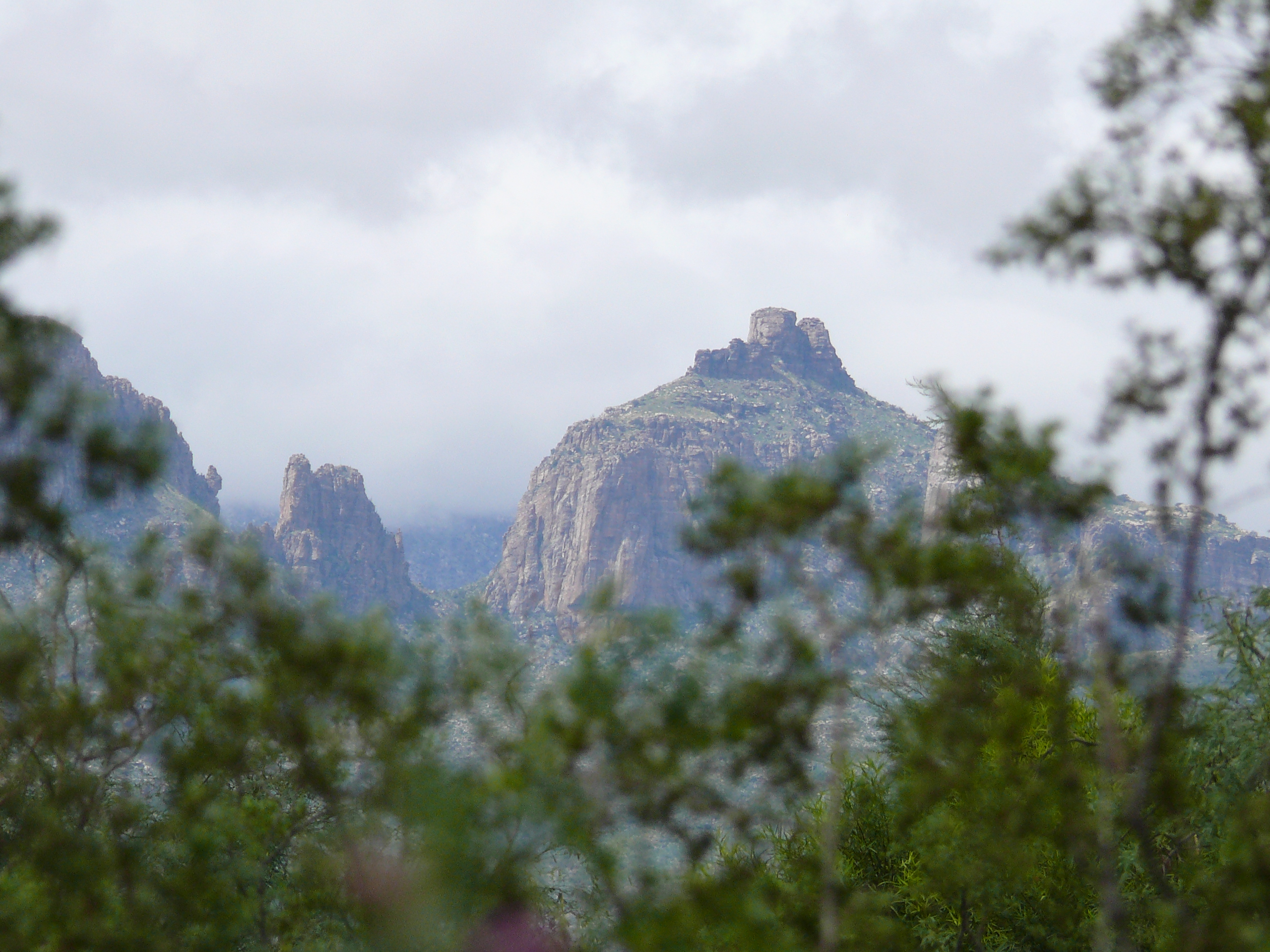
- Thimble Peak as seen from Tucson's east side

Highest point
- Elevation: 5,323 ft (1,622 m) NGVD 29
- Prominence: 403 ft (123 m)
- Coordinates: 32°20′15″N 110°46′27″W

Geography
- Location within Arizona
- Location: Tucson, Pima County, Arizona, U.S.
- Parent range: Santa Catalina Mountains
- Topo map: USGS Sabino Canyon

Thimble Peak is a well-known landmark in the Santa Catalina Mountains north of Tucson, Arizona. Thimble Peak rises from the foothills on the south side of the range. To its east is Bear Canyon, while to its west is Sabino Canyon. The peak is in the Pusch Ridge Wilderness on the Coronado National Forest.

There are no trails to the peak itself. The final ascent of the "cap" requires technical climbing skills, class 3 to 5.
