= Pima Canyon =

Landform in the Santa Catalina Mountains, Arizona

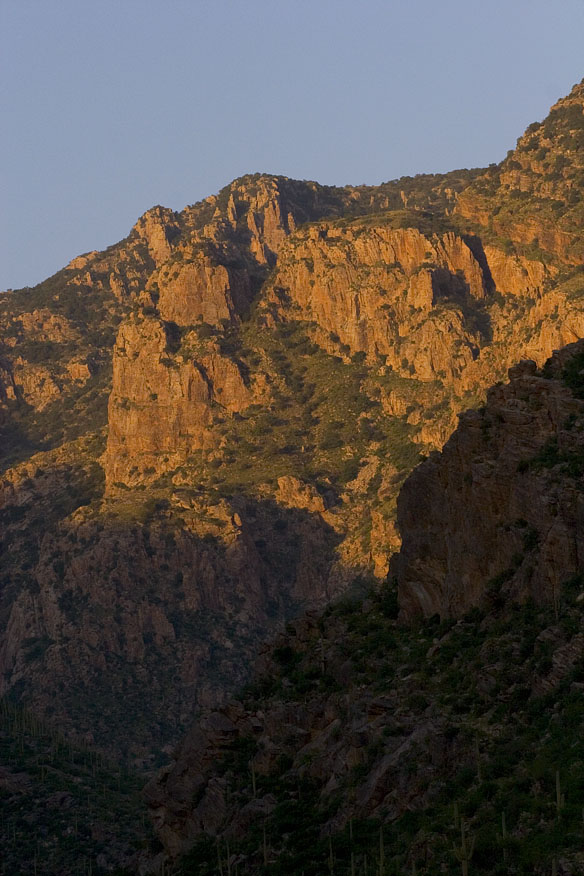
- Pima Canyon

- Location within Arizona
- Floor elevation: 2,900 feet (884 m) to 6,350 feet (1,935 m)
- Length: 5 miles (8.0 km)

Geography
- Location: Tucson, Arizona, United States
- Coordinates: 32°13′N 110°55′W
- Interactive map of Pima Canyon

Pima Canyon is a major canyon located in the Santa Catalina Mountains, north of Catalina Foothills and Tucson, Arizona, US. Pusch Ridge forms the northwestern cliffs of Pima Canyon, dramatically rising from Pima Creek on the canyon floor. Pima Canyon varies greatly in elevation, from 2,900 feet (880 m) above sea level at Pima Creek to 6,350 feet (1,940 m) at Pima Saddle. Mount Kimball is the highest peak in the vicinity of the canyon.

== Geography ==
The source of Pima Creek is located below the Pima Saddle, which is at an elevation of 6,350 feet (1,935 m). The distance from the Pima Canyon Trailhead to the Pima Saddle is about 5 miles (8.0 km). (Note: This was measured on Google Earth.) The creek flows intermittently throughout the year, usually after substantial rain or snow melt in the Santa Catalina Mountains.

Pima Canyon, which is called a desert riparian habitat, has good opportunities for birdwatching. Many desert creatures can be seen, the larger of which are jackrabbits, javelina, and desert bighorn sheep. Because of its proximity to the Tucson metropolitan area, Pima Canyon is described as "overused", especially during the mild local winters. Many varieties of desert plants can be seen along the trail including the ocotillo, prickly pear, palo verde, mesquite, and the ubiquitous saguaro.

== Pima Canyon Trail ==
From Oro Valley, the Pima Canyon trailhead can be reached by driving east from Oracle Road (Arizona Highway 77) on Magee Road until it dead ends. From Ina Road, take Christie Drive north until it intersects with Magee and turn right. The Pima Canyon Trail is numbered # 62. The trailhead carries the name Iris O. Dewhirst.

The lower section of the trail, which runs from the trailhead to the lower dam, is 3.2 miles (5.1 km) long. The lowest elevation at the trailhead is 2,900 feet (884 m) while the highest elevation at the dam is 3,750 feet (1,143 m) according to the Sierra Club. Another calculation of the dam's elevation is 3,960 feet (1,207 m) at 32°22′07.3″N 110°54′39.5″W. (Note: According to Google Earth, the dam is at 3,960 feet.) The trail has a difficulty rating of C and is called a "popular and easy hike". The Sierra Club website estimates that the 6.4 miles (10.3 km) round trip to the lower dam and back can take two and a half hours. Another source states that the round trip is three hours or more. The US Forest Service does not permit dogs or motorized vehicles on the trail.

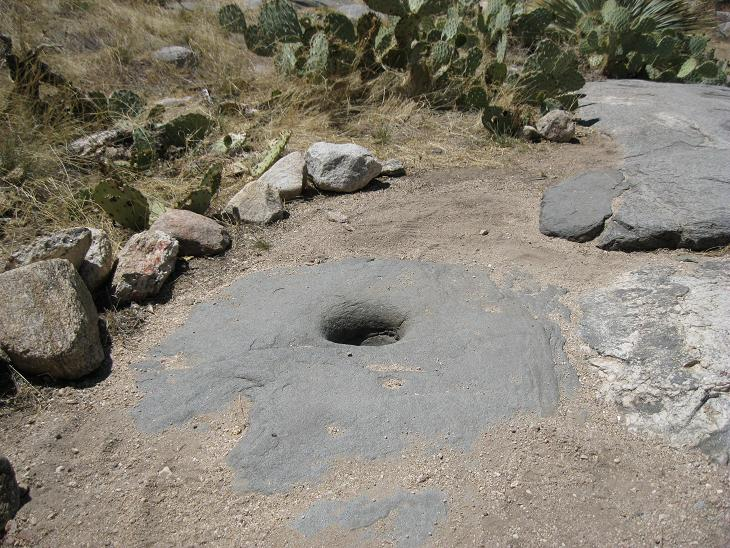
Pothole in the rock near the dam, thought to be used by Native Americans for grinding

From the parking lot, the trail heads east toward the mouth of the canyon. Signs indicate that private property surrounds the trail at this point and request that hikers stay on the well-marked trail. After a few minutes, a hiker will come upon a metal sign pointing to the left and indicating that Mount Kimball is 7 miles away. Follow the sign to the left. The hiker soon enters the canyon and steep rock faces rise on both sides on the canyon. After about 45 minutes from the start, hikers will arrive at a place where there are some cottonwood trees. Another 30 to 40 minutes will bring hikers to the small dam. Nearby, there are potholes in the rock that Native Americans used for grinding.

The distance from the dam to Pima Spring is about 2 miles (3.2 km). The trail gets steeper and more difficult in this stretch. The round trip hike to Pima Spring is considered a "nice day hike" as an alternative to the full seven miles to Mount Kimball. From Pima Spring to Mount Kimball, the trail is very steep and hard to follow. There is a metal sign that points to Pima Saddle, which is on the crest of Pusch Ridge. The hike to the Pima Saddle and back is said to take eight or more hours.

From Pima Saddle, the trail is faint and hikers must keep an eye out for cairns. The view from Mount Kimball is said to be spectacular. The roundtrip distance from trailhead to Mount Kimball is said to be 14.2 miles (22.9 km) and the elevation gain is about 4,500 feet (1,372 m). The US Forest Service website notes that the trail is 8.6 miles (13.8 km) one-way in length. Near Mount Kimball, trail # 62 intersects with the Finger Rock Trail # 42.

Significant peaks can be seen along the trail, including Rosewood Point at 4,300 feet (1,311 m), Prominent Point at 6,700 feet (2,042 m), and Mount Kimball at 7,255 feet (2,211 m) on the southeast (right) side of the canyon. On the northwest (left) side of the canyon lie Pusch Peak at 5,362 feet (1,634 m), Bighorn Mountain at 5,600 feet (1,707 m), Table Mountain 6,200 feet (1,890 m), and the Wolf's Teeth.

== Pima Canyon Trail Photos ==
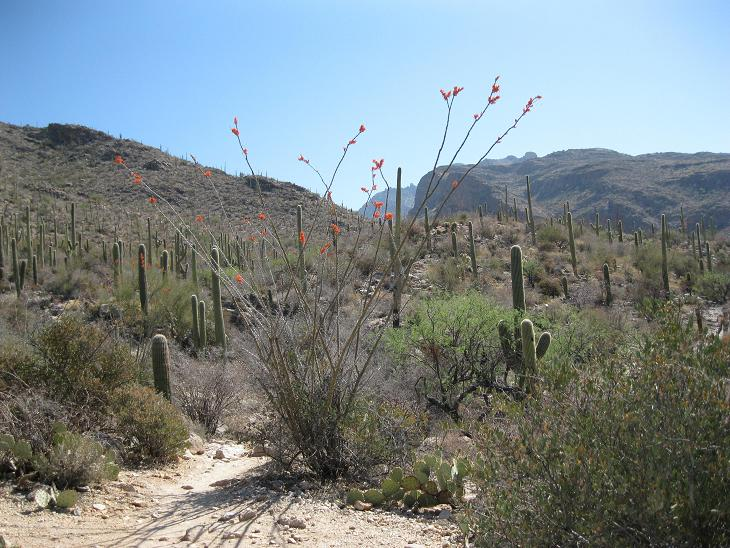
Approach to Pima Canyon

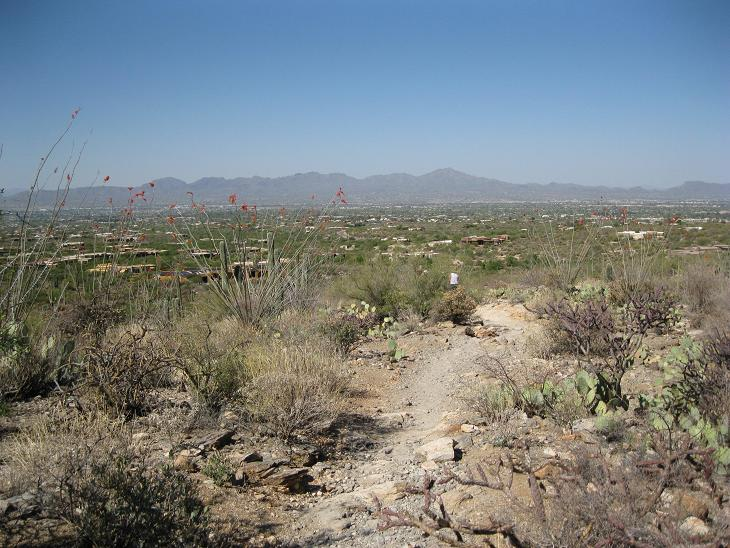
Tucson Range from Pima Canyon

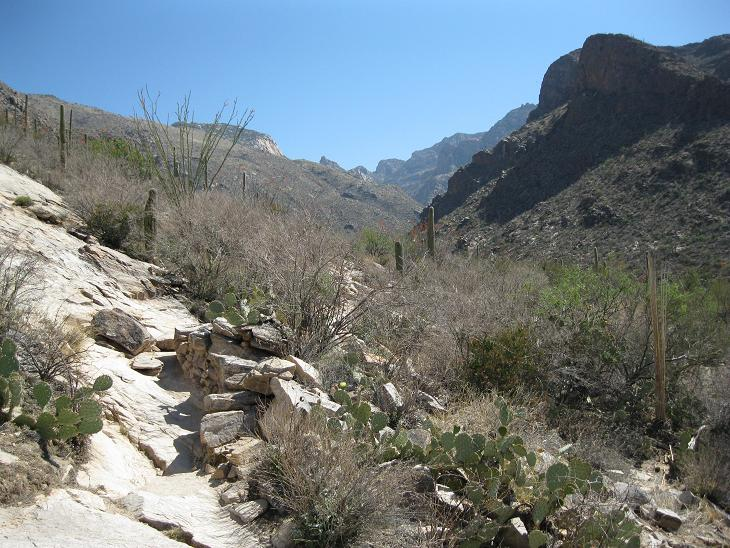
Mouth of Pima Canyon

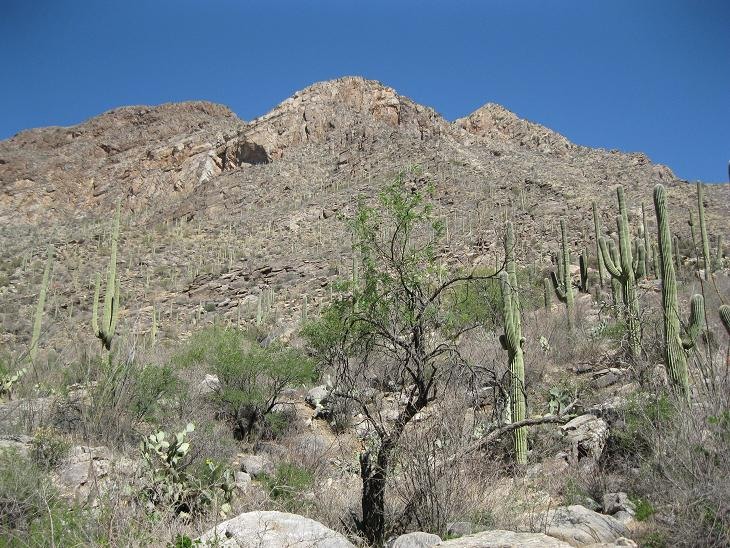
Pusch Peak from Pima Canyon

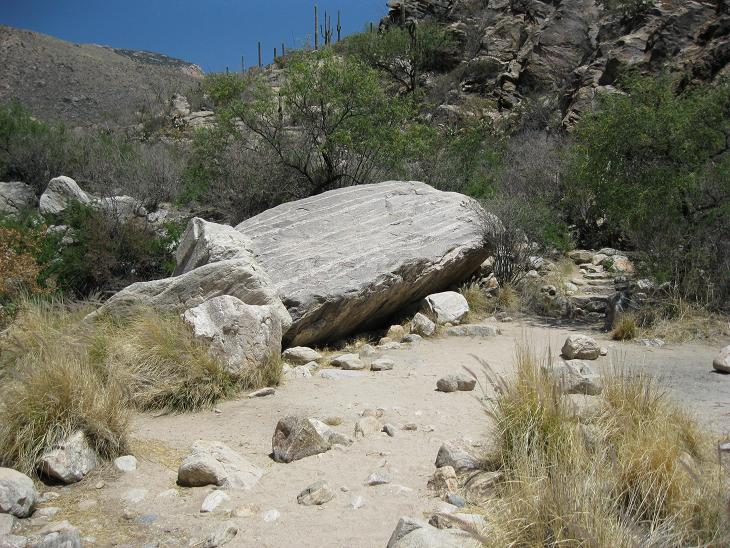
First Trail Crossing of Pima Wash

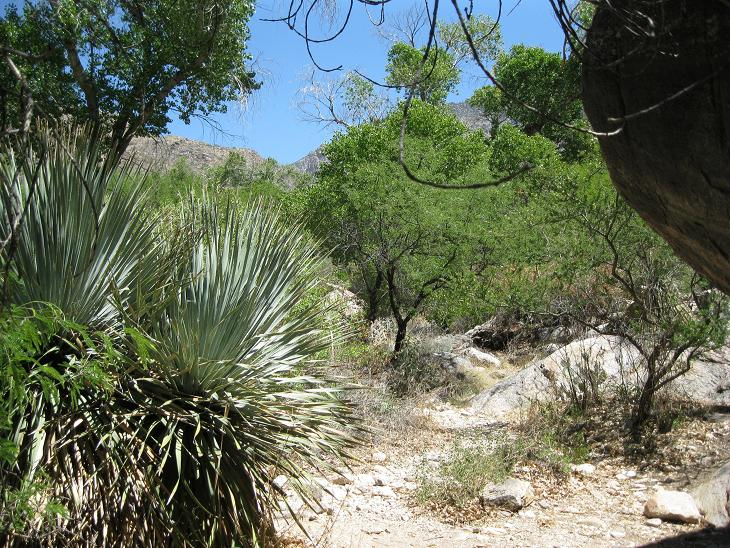
Fourth Trail Crossing of Pima Wash

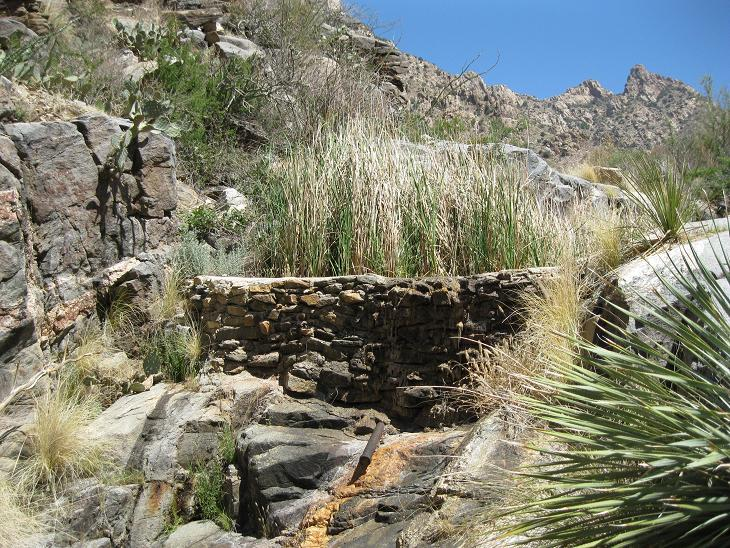
Lower dam in Pima Canyon

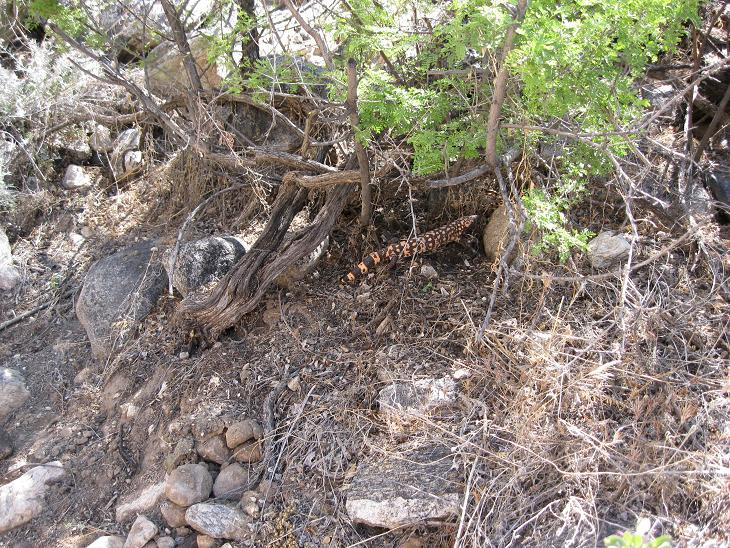
Gila Monster near trail

== Notes ==
Footnotes

Citations
