= Catalina Foothills, Arizona =

CDP in Pima County, Arizona

- CDP
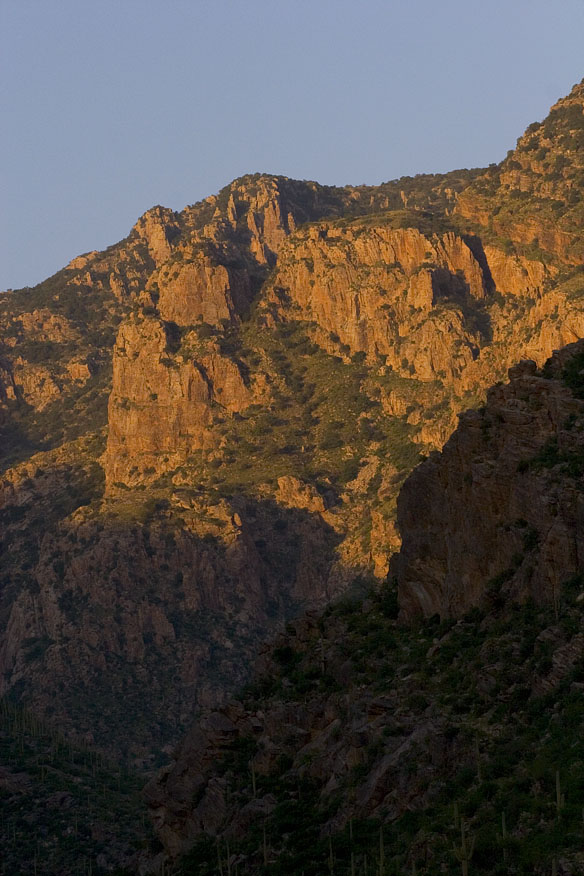
- Pima Canyon

- Location in Pima County and the state of Arizona

- Location in the United States
- Coordinates: 32°17′38″N 110°53′2″W
- Country: United States
- State: Arizona
- County: Pima

Area
  - Total: 41.92 sq mi (108.58 km^{2})
  - Land: 41.85 sq mi (108.38 km^{2})
  - Water: 0.077 sq mi (0.20 km^{2})
- Elevation: 2,575 ft (785 m)

Population (2020)
  - Total: 52,401
  - Density: 1,252.2/sq mi (483.49/km^{2})
- Time zone: UTC-7 (MST (no DST))
- FIPS code: 04-11230
- GNIS feature ID: 37214

Catalina Foothills is an unincorporated community and census-designated place (CDP) located in greater Tucson in Pima County, Arizona, United States. Situated in the southern foothills of the Santa Catalina Mountains, Catalina Foothills had a population of 50,796 at the 2010 census.

== History ==
Modern development of the Catalina Foothills area dates back to the early 1920s. Prior to that time, the Catalina Foothills area was primarily federal trust land and open range for cattle grazing. Beginning in the 1920s, John Murphey began purchasing property north of River Road in the foothills of the Santa Catalina Mountains.

Murphey originally planned to develop ten housing subdivisions with large lots. Murphey's vision for the Catalina Foothills community was low-density residential development, on lots designed for maximum privacy, preserving existing desert vegetation, the natural terrain and mountain views. In 1928 Murphey bought a 7,000 acres (28 km^{2}) tract of land north of River Road between North Oracle Road and Sabino Canyon in a federal land auction.

Around the same time, Josias Joesler, a Swiss architect, was retained to implement John Murphey's vision. Residential development in the Catalina Foothills began in the 1930s, and Joesler designed a number of the homes.

In 1931, residents of the Foothills area organized the Catalina Foothills School District to serve the local school-aged population. Murphey sold the school district the land for the first school building near East River Road and North Campbell Avenue, and Joesler designed the first school building. This building continues to house the school district's administration.

In 1936, Joesler and Murphey completed the building of St. Philip's in the Hills Episcopal Church at the corner of Campbell Avenue and River Road, which was then the main entrance to the Catalina Foothills Estates, an example of Spanish Colonial Mission architecture. The land for the church was donated by Murphey, and Joesler donated his services for its design. The congregation paid only for construction.

The Catalina Foothills area’s population continued to expand, as development continued northward on the Oracle Road corridor, and eastward along the Ina Road/Skyline Drive corridor. In 1963, the Skyline Country Club was established. In the 1980s, both La Paloma Resort and Ventana Canyon Resort were established.

While the Catalina Foothills community supports a population exceeding 50,000, most of the neighborhoods maintain a low-density and suburban character.

In 2026, the community saw widespread media coverage following the abduction of Nancy Guthrie.

== Geography ==
The Catalina Foothills area is defined as north of River Road, east of Oracle Road, and west of Sabino Creek in Tucson. The Catalina Foothills community is bounded to the north by the Santa Catalina Ranger District of the Coronado National Forest.

According to the United States Census Bureau, the CDP has a total area of 44.6 square miles (115.5 km^{2}), of which 44.5 square miles (115.2 km^{2}) is land and 0.1 square mile (0.3 km^{2}) (0.3%) is water.

== Demographics ==
Historical population
Census	Pop.	Note	%±
2000	53,794		—
2010	50,796		−5.6%
2020	52,401		3.2%
U.S. Decennial Census

=== 2020 census ===
As of the 2020 census, Catalina Foothills had a population of 52,401. The median age was 56.5 years. 14.6% of residents were under the age of 18 and 35.5% of residents were 65 years of age or older. For every 100 females there were 91.8 males, and for every 100 females age 18 and over there were 89.5 males age 18 and over.

99.8% of residents lived in urban areas, while 0.2% lived in rural areas.

There were 24,445 households in Catalina Foothills, of which 18.5% had children under the age of 18 living in them. Of all households, 53.9% were married-couple households, 15.9% were households with a male householder and no spouse or partner present, and 25.2% were households with a female householder and no spouse or partner present. About 31.0% of all households were made up of individuals and 16.0% had someone living alone who was 65 years of age or older.

There were 27,623 housing units, of which 11.5% were vacant. The homeowner vacancy rate was 1.9% and the rental vacancy rate was 11.3%.

Racial composition as of the 2020 census
Race	Number	Percent
White	41,075	78.4%
Black or African American	788	1.5%
American Indian and Alaska Native	228	0.4%
Asian	3,293	6.3%
Native Hawaiian and Other Pacific Islander	68	0.1%
Some other race	1,350	2.6%
Two or more races	5,599	10.7%
Hispanic or Latino (of any race)	6,486	12.4%

=== 2000 census ===
As of the 2000 census, there were 53,794 people, 23,948 households, and 15,590 families residing in the CDP. The population density was 1,209.5 inhabitants per square mile (467.0/km^{2}). There were 26,372 housing units at an average density of 593.0 per square mile (229.0/km^{2}). The racial makeup of the CDP was 91.4% White, 1.2% Black or African American, 0.5% Native American, 3.2% Asian, 0.1% Pacific Islander, 1.7% from other races, and 1.9% from two or more races. 7.6% of the population were Hispanic or Latino of any race.

There were 23,948 households, out of which 24.6% had children under the age of 18 living with them, 57.3% were married couples living together, 5.6% had a female householder with no husband present, and 34.9% were non-families. 28.8% of all households were made up of individuals, and 9.2% had someone living alone who was 65 years of age or older. The average household size was 2.23 and the average family size was 2.76.

In the CDP, the population was spread out, with 19.9% under the age of 18, 6.4% from 18 to 24, 23.0% from 25 to 44, 31.8% from 45 to 64, and 19.0% who were 65 years of age or older. The median age was 45 years. For every 100 females, there were 93.4 males. For every 100 females age 18 and over, there were 91.0 males.

The median income for a household in the CDP was $65,657, and the median income for a family was $82,675. Males had a median income of $61,697 versus $37,077 for females. The per capita income for the CDP was $42,006. About 2.4% of families and 4.3% of the population were below the poverty line, including 3.8% of those under age 18 and 3.2% of those age 65 or over.

== Arts and culture ==
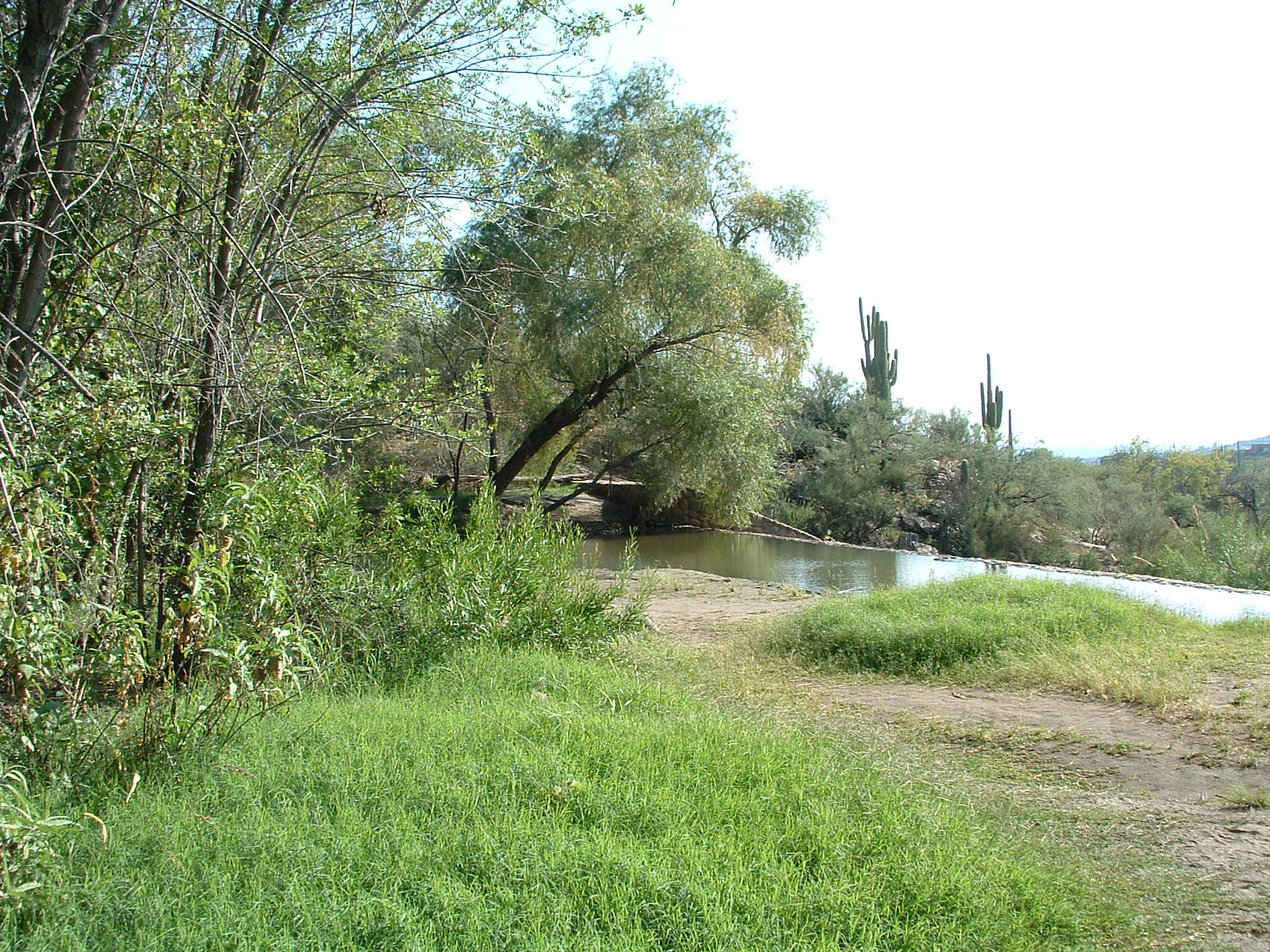
Desert oasis in Sabino Canyon

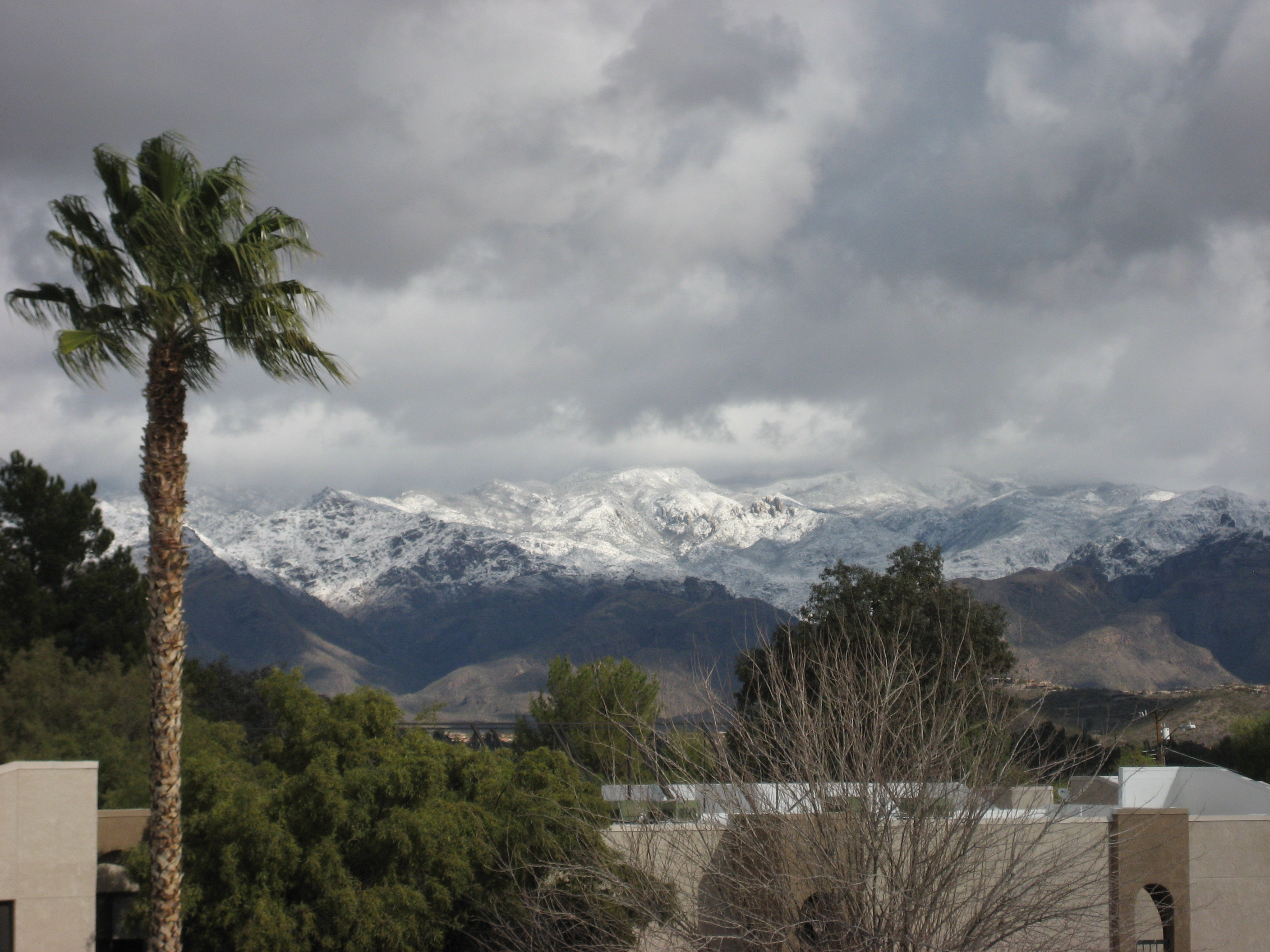
Santa Catalina Mountains in winter, viewed from the Catalina Foothills

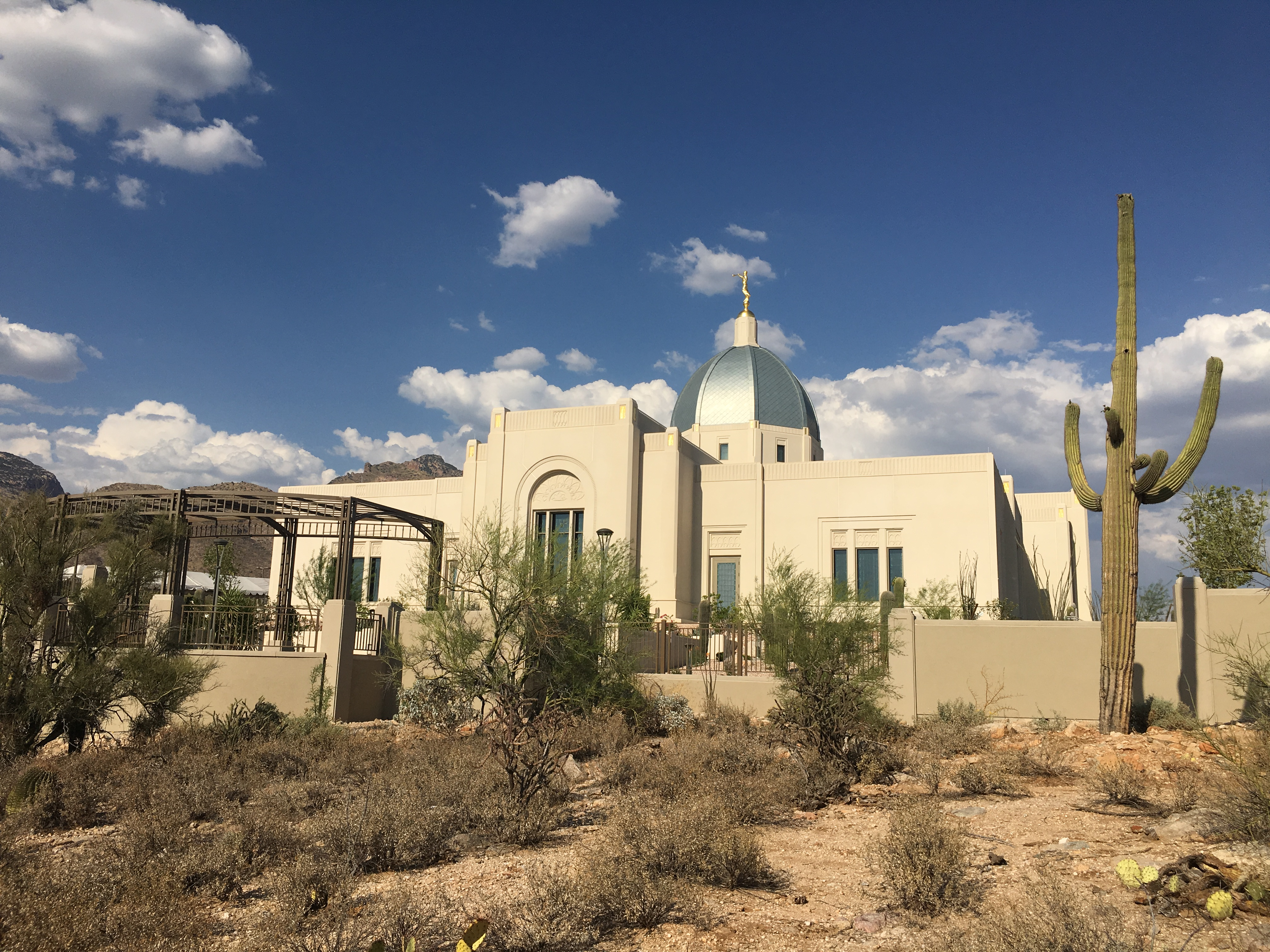
Tucson Arizona Temple, built in 2017

Notable attractions in the Santa Catalina Mountains include:

- Sabino Canyon
- Bear Canyon
- Pima Canyon

Resorts include Hacienda del Sol Resort, Westin La Paloma Resort, Loews Ventana Canyon Resort, Westward Look Wyndham Grand Resort, and Canyon Ranch Resort.

The Foothills area is also home to the DeGrazia Gallery in the Sun near the intersection of North Swan Road and East Skyline Drive. Built by artist Ted DeGrazia starting in 1951, the 10-acre (40,000 m^{2}) property is listed on the National Register of Historic Places and features an eclectic chapel, an art gallery, and a free museum. The Catalina Foothills is home to La Encantada, the largest upscale shopping center in the Tucson metropolitan area.

Catalina Foothills also has an unusual subdivision in Tucson, called Sin Vacas (Without Cows). The land where Sin Vacas subdivision now sits was owned at one point by steel magnate William J. “Jack” Holliday who was fond of desert wildlife and fenced in his property to keep cows out and called it Rancho Sin Vacas (Ranch Without Cows). Developer Kelley Rollings later purchased the land and, along with his Spanish-speaking office manager, named some streets after the Seven Deadly Sins, such as Plaza Sin Lujuria (Place Without Lust).

The Tucson Arizona Temple of the Church of Jesus Christ of Latter-day Saints is in Catalina Foothills. It was completed in 2017.

== Education ==
The Catalina Foothills area is served by three public school districts: Catalina Foothills Unified School District, Tucson Unified School District, and Amphitheater Public Schools (a.k.a. Amphitheater Unified School District).

- Catalina Foothills USD serves the upper Catalina Foothills.
- Tucson USD serves the lower and northeastern neighborhoods of the Catalina Foothills. TUSD schools that serve the Catalina Foothills are Jacob C. Fruchtendler Elementary School, Joseph W. Magee Middle School, Doolen Middle School, W. V. Whitmore Elementary School, Davidson Elementary School, Catalina High School, and Sabino High School.
- Amphitheater USD serves neighborhoods in the western Catalina Foothills, namely Pima Canyon Estates, Cobblestone Estates, and the Via Entrada neighborhood.

Small portions of the CDP are not in any school district.

== See also ==
- Santa Catalina Ranger District
- Pusch Ridge Wilderness
