= Sutherland Trail =

Arizona State Park hiking trail

Coordinates: 32.47113°N 110.89053°W

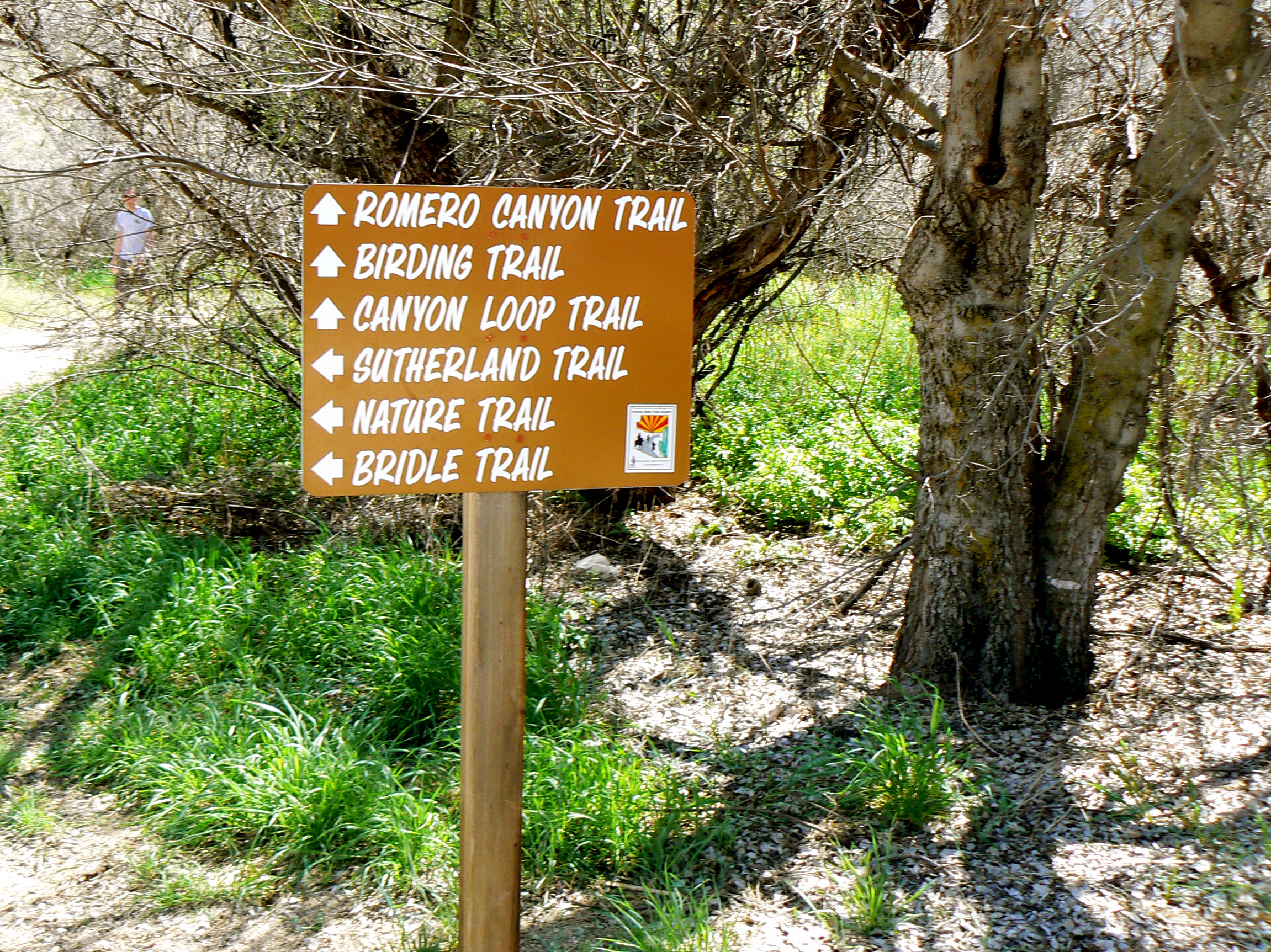
Trailhead sign displaying the Sutherland Trail and other trails in the area

Sutherland Trail is a trail near Tucson, Arizona. It is part of Catalina State Park located in Oro Valley. 10.5 miles (16.9 km) long, the trail connects to other Coronado National Forest trails which extend on to Mount Lemmon at the summit of the Catalina Mountains.

== Namesake ==
Sutherland Trail was named after the Sutherland family that used to inhabit the area in the 1800s.
