= Rose Canyon =

Rose Canyon may refer to:

- Rose Canyon Lake, a lake located northeast of Tucson, Arizona in the Santa Catalina Mountains
- Rose Canyon Fault, a right-lateral strike-slip fault running in a north–south direction through San Diego County, California
