= Catalina, Arizona =

CDP in Pima County, Arizona

- CDP
- Location in Pima County and the state of Arizona
- Coordinates: 32°29′28″N 110°54′28″W
- Country: United States
- State: Arizona
- County: Pima

Area
  - Total: 14.14 sq mi (36.62 km^{2})
  - Land: 14.14 sq mi (36.62 km^{2})
  - Water: 0 sq mi (0.00 km^{2})
- Elevation: 3,123 ft (952 m)

Population (2020)
  - Total: 7,551
  - Density: 534.0/sq mi (206.17/km^{2})
- Time zone: UTC-7 (MST (no DST))
- ZIP codes: 85738-85739
- Area code: 520
- FIPS code: 04-11160
- GNIS feature ID: 37213

Catalina is a census-designated place (CDP) in Pima County, Arizona, United States. The population was 7,025 at the 2000 census. Catalina continues to experience increasing population growth, while attempting to maintain its rural character. Catalina remains an unincorporated community, with no plans for annexation into any nearby towns.

== Geography ==
Catalina is located at 32°29′28″N 110°54′28″W (32.491151, -110.907652).

According to the United States Census Bureau, the CDP has a total area of 13.9 square miles (36 km^{2}), all land.

== Demographics ==
Historical population
| Census | Pop. | Note | %± |
|---|---|---|---|
| 2020 | 7,551 | | — |
U.S. Decennial Census

=== 2020 census ===
As of the 2020 census, Catalina had a population of 7,551. The median age was 53.6 years. 17.4% of residents were under the age of 18 and 29.6% of residents were 65 years of age or older. For every 100 females there were 96.7 males, and for every 100 females age 18 and over there were 95.4 males age 18 and over.

88.4% of residents lived in urban areas, while 11.6% lived in rural areas.

There were 3,098 households in Catalina, of which 21.4% had children under the age of 18 living in them. Of all households, 53.4% were married-couple households, 16.8% were households with a male householder and no spouse or partner present, and 24.0% were households with a female householder and no spouse or partner present. About 26.7% of all households were made up of individuals and 15.6% had someone living alone who was 65 years of age or older.

There were 3,427 housing units, of which 9.6% were vacant. The homeowner vacancy rate was 1.6% and the rental vacancy rate was 10.1%.

Racial composition as of the 2020 census
| Race | Number | Percent |
|---|---|---|
| White | 5,623 | 74.5% |
| Black or African American | 80 | 1.1% |
| American Indian and Alaska Native | 80 | 1.1% |
| Asian | 84 | 1.1% |
| Native Hawaiian and Other Pacific Islander | 15 | 0.2% |
| Some other race | 713 | 9.4% |
| Two or more races | 956 | 12.7% |
| Hispanic or Latino (of any race) | 1,856 | 24.6% |

=== 2000 census ===
As of the census of 2000, there were 7,025 people, 2,567 households, and 1,899 families residing in the CDP. The population density was 506.6 inhabitants per square mile (195.6/km^{2}). There were 2,755 housing units at an average density of 198.7 per square mile (76.7/km^{2}). The racial makeup of the CDP was 85.2% White, 0.5% Black or African American, 1.4% Native American, 0.4% Asian, 0.2% Pacific Islander, 9.7% from other races, and 2.6% from two or more races. 23.7% of the population were Hispanic or Latino of any race.

There were 2,567 households, out of which 33.5% had children under the age of 18 living with them, 58.2% were married couples living together, 10.3% had a female householder with no husband present, and 26.0% were non-families. 20.3% of all households were made up of individuals, and 8.2% had someone living alone who was 65 years of age or older. The average household size was 2.67 and the average family size was 3.05.

In the CDP, the population was spread out, with 27.5% under the age of 18, 7.5% from 18 to 24, 25.6% from 25 to 44, 25.4% from 45 to 64, and 14.1% who were 65 years of age or older. The median age was 39 years. For every 100 females, there were 101.5 males. For every 100 females age 18 and over, there were 92.2 males.

The median income for a household in the CDP was $37,482, and the median income for a family was $41,114. Males had a median income of $26,490 versus $22,667 for females. The per capita income for the CDP was $16,588. About 7.9% of families and 9.7% of the population were below the poverty line, including 9.4% of those under age 18 and 3.8% of those age 65 or over.

== History ==
Much of Catalina's history and the land it now sits on is connected with the Golder Ranch. Lloyd Golder III and family moved to Tucson from Illinois in 1956 and by the following year had purchased the Rancho Vistoso, which at the time was a 4,800 acre ranch. In 1959, Golder bought the nearby 18,000-acre, Rail N. Ranch from Roberta Nicholas whose ranch house is now the administration building for the Miraval Resort. The land included parts of what is now Catalina State Park to the south and part of the land where Biosphere 2 now sits, to the north.

From 1961 to 1964 he built the Golder Dam about 4 miles north of the Pinal County line but in a legal action that lasted several decades it was declared unsafe and the lakeside community that would have been called Lago del Oro, was never built. The Saddlebrooke subdivision now occupies that land and only the Lago Del Oro Parkway still exists as a reminder of the failed community. He later developed the Twin Lakes subdivision and the Rail N. Ranch subdivision on his land as well as naming many of the streets on his land. Lloyd Golder III died in 2013. The ranch commonly known as Golder Ranch is legally still called the Rail N. Ranch and is still an active open-range ranch.

== Governmental representation ==
Catalina is in Arizona's 6th Congressional District, served by Representative, Juan Ciscomani, a Republican. The CDP is also in Arizona's 11th State Legislative District, served by Representatives Mark Finchem and Vince Leach and Senator Steve Smith, all Republicans.
