= Santa Catalina Mountains =

Mountain range in Pima and Pinal counties, Arizona, United States

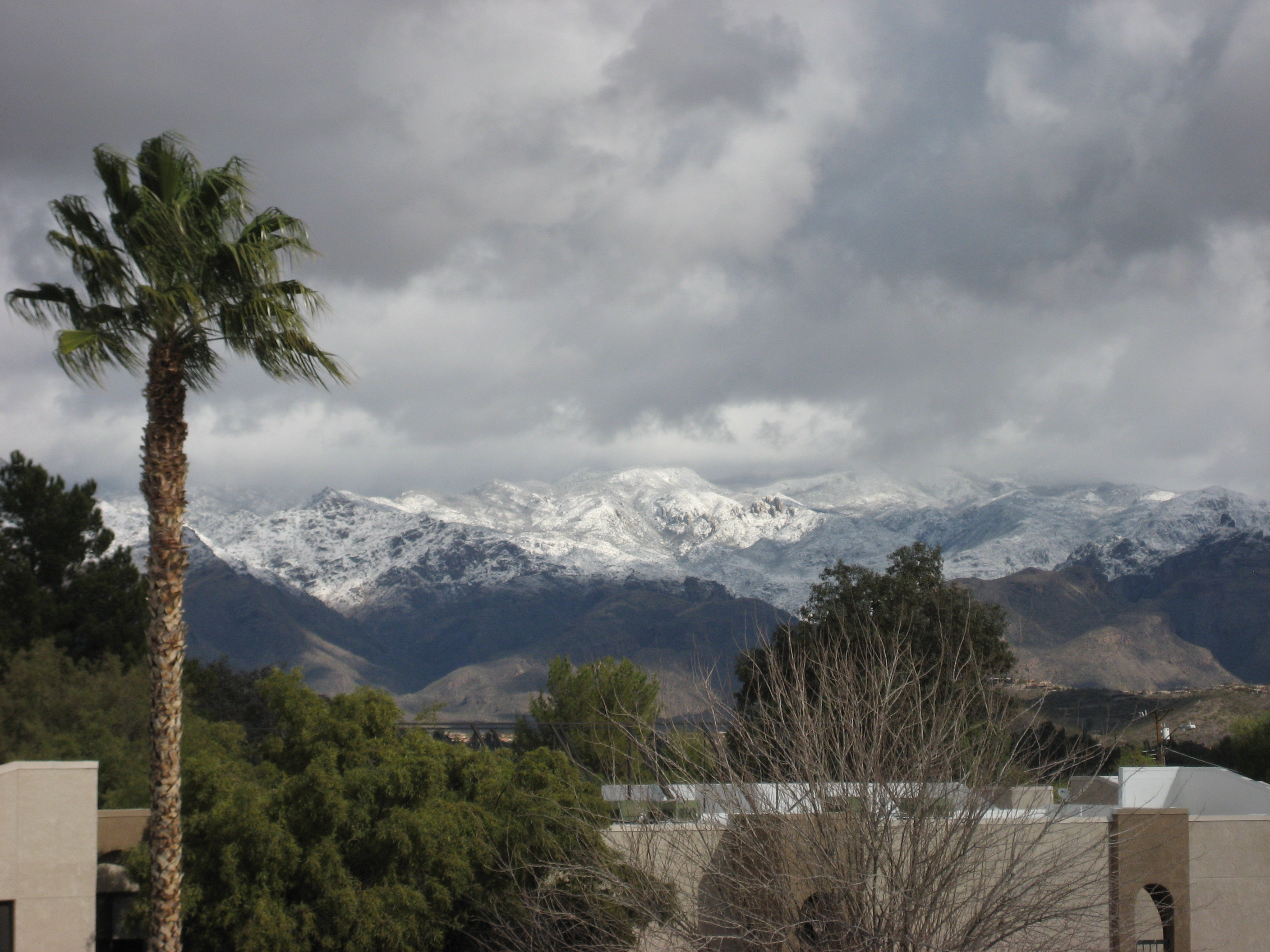
- The Santa Catalina Mountains, as seen from Pinal County, covered in snow

Highest point
- Peak: Mount Lemmon, N of Summerhaven
- Elevation: 9,157 ft (2,791 m)
- Coordinates: 32°26′35″N 110°47′17″W

Dimensions
- Length: 18 mi (29 km) E–W
- Width: 14 mi (23 km)

Geography
- Location: Madrean Sky Islands
- Country: United States
- State: Arizona
- Regions: American Southwest; Sonoran Desert
- Counties: Pima; Pinal
- Communities: Tucson; Oro Valley; Catalina; Catalina Foothills; Tanque Verde; Summerhaven; Oracle

Geology
- Rock ages: Laramide Igneous Rock; Precambrian
- Rock type: Intrusive igneous rock (granite)

The Santa Catalina Mountains, commonly referred to as the Catalina Mountains or the Catalinas, are north and northeast of Tucson, Arizona, United States, on Tucson's north perimeter. The mountain range is the most prominent in the Tucson area, near Catalina Foothills, an unincorporated community, with the highest average elevation. The highest point in the Catalinas is Mount Lemmon at an elevation of 9,157 feet (2,791 m) above sea level and receives 18 inches (460 mm) of precipitation annually. The scenic, 27-mile Catalina Highway winds through the mountain range up to the village of Summerhaven near Mount Lemmon.

Originally known by the Tohono O'odham Nation as Babad Do'ag, the Catalinas were later named in 1697 by the Italian Jesuit Eusebio Francisco Kino in honor of Catherine of Alexandria who was the patron saint of Kino's oldest sister.

The Catalinas are part of the Santa Catalina Ranger District located in the Coronado National Forest, and also include the Pusch Ridge Wilderness Area. The mountain range is considered a prominent range in the Madrean sky islands, and partially delimits the mountain ranges in the northwest of the sky island region; lower elevation bajadas associated with the Santa Cruz River Valley spread northwestwards towards Phoenix.

Catalina Sky Survey (CSS), on Mt. Lemmon, is a project to discover comets and asteroids, and to search for near-Earth objects (NEOs). More specifically, CSS is to search for any potentially hazardous asteroids that may pose a threat of impact. Its southern hemisphere counterpart, the Siding Spring Survey (SSS) was closed in 2013.

The Catalinas are a significant focus of recreational activity, with areas such as Sabino Canyon providing streams and perennial pools for visitors, by road access; Sabino Canyon is also a dayhiking access point. Catalina State Park in the western foothills of the Catalinas attracts visitors for its hiking opportunities and permanent pools in Romero Canyon. The village of Summerhaven on Mount Lemmon serves as a popular summer retreat from the heat of Arizona's lower deserts. Mount Lemmon Ski Valley is also notable as it is the southernmost ski destination in the United States.

Other mountain ranges surrounding the Santa Cruz Valley include the Santa Rita Mountains, the Rincon Mountains, the Tucson Mountains, and the Tortolita Mountains.

== Name ==
The Catalinas were originally named the "Sierra de la Santa Catarina" as depicted on a German map from 1875 or "Santa Catrina Mountains" as in a prior map dating back to 1864. A successive map from 1890 still referred to the Catalinas as the "Santa Catarina Mountains." However, a map from 1895 depicted the range with the name "Santa Catalina." Various maps during the 1880s and 1890s referred to the range as either "Santa Catarina" or "Santa Catalina." However, by 1902 the range was officially designated the "Santa Catalina Mountains," as the United States General Land Office established the Santa Catalina Forest Reserve that year, encompassing 155,520 acres (629 km^{2}) (later to become the Santa Catalina National Forest.) As such, the name of the range apparently morphed into the current "Santa Catalina Mountains" sometime between 1890 and 1902, but each previous version of the name always referred to the namesake St. Catherine.

== National Forest ==
Following the Gadsden Purchase, Americans increasingly moved into the Arizona Territory and focused on the Catalinas in search of gold, silver, and copper beginning in the 1850s. By the late 1880s, residents of southern Arizona desired protection for the Catalinas, and the U.S. Congress authorized the President to designate specific lands around the U.S. to be removed from the public domain under the Forest Reserve Act of 1891. As mentioned above, the Santa Catalina Forest Reserve was created on July 2, 1902, and after the National Forest Service was organized in 1905, the reserve became the Santa Catalina National Forest on March 4, 1907. On July 1, 1908, it was combined with two other nearby national forests (Dragoon and Santa Rita) to create the present Coronado National Forest.

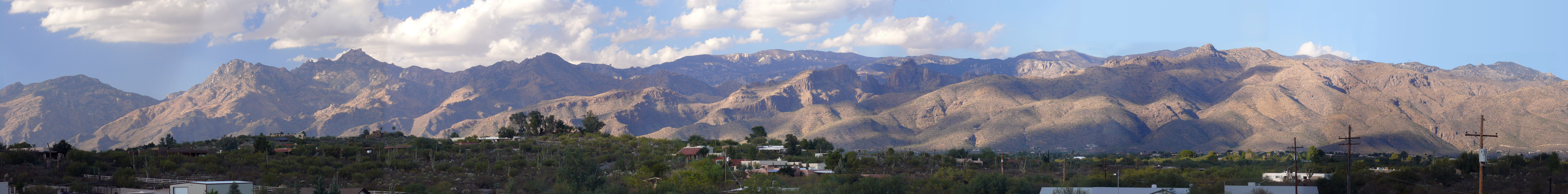
The south side of the Santa Catalina Mountains

== Ecology ==
The Catalinas are characterized by rugged peaks and rocks and deep canyons and slopes. From the base of desert lowlands to the high point of Mount Lemmon and subalpine forests, there is an elevation change of 6,371 feet. This significant elevation change results in diverse ecosystems. Many high elevation south-facing slopes are dominated by ponderosa pines. The deeper canyons at greater elevations, particularly those fed by running streams, give rise to rich hardwood forests, where species such as bigtooth maple, aspen, New Mexico locust, Arizona walnut, Gambel oak, and velvet ash flourish.

== Climate and Weather ==
Elevation plays a defining role in shaping the climate of the Santa Catalina Mountains. The lower reaches reflect their Sonoran Desert surroundings, with scorching summers, mild winters, and predominantly dry conditions. Climbing higher, temperatures gradually cool and rainfall becomes more abundant, creating a temperate environment that sustains a diverse array of plants and animals. Precipitation follows a two-season rhythm throughout the mountains: winter brings steady rains, while the North American Monsoon sweeps in during late summer, delivering dramatic afternoon thunderstorms.

== Notable sites and areas ==
=== Mountains and ridges ===
- Cathedral Rock
- Gorp Peak: West of Ventana Canyon
- Mount Bigelow
- Mount Kimball
- Mount Lemmon: highest point
- Pusch Ridge: westernmost point
- Rattlesnake Peak
- Table Mountain
- Thimble Peak
- Window Peak: east of Ventana Canyon

=== Canyons ===
- Bear Canyon
- Box Camp Canyon
- Cañada del Oro: north of Mount Lemmon
- Esperero Canyon
- Molino Canyon
- Pima Canyon: southeast of Pusch Ridge
- Romero Canyon: located in Catalina State Park
- Sabino Canyon
- Ventana Canyon

=== Other ===
- Arizona Trail
- Rose Canyon Lake
- Catalina Highway
- Catalina State Park
- Pusch Ridge Wilderness Area
- Redington Pass
- Summerhaven
- Tanque Verde Falls
- Peppersauce Cave

== Miscellaneous facts ==
- It is the type locality of a species of Noctuidae or owlet moths (see List of butterflies and moths of Arizona)
- Mount Lemmon is named after Sara Lemmon, a plant collector and the first white woman to ascend the peak in 1881.
- Mercer Spring, located at the Molino Basin Campground on Mount Lemmon, is named for rancher Dell Mercer who had a ranch at the basin at one point.
- Sollers Road, Sollers Point and Sollers Cabin, all on Mount Lemmon are named in honor of a fallen forest ranger named Carl Sollers.
- Barnum Rock, a large rock formation, near San Pedro Vista, once used as a fire lookout and now used for rock climbing, is named for Willis E. Barnum Sr. a former Boy Scout Commissioner.

== Gallery ==
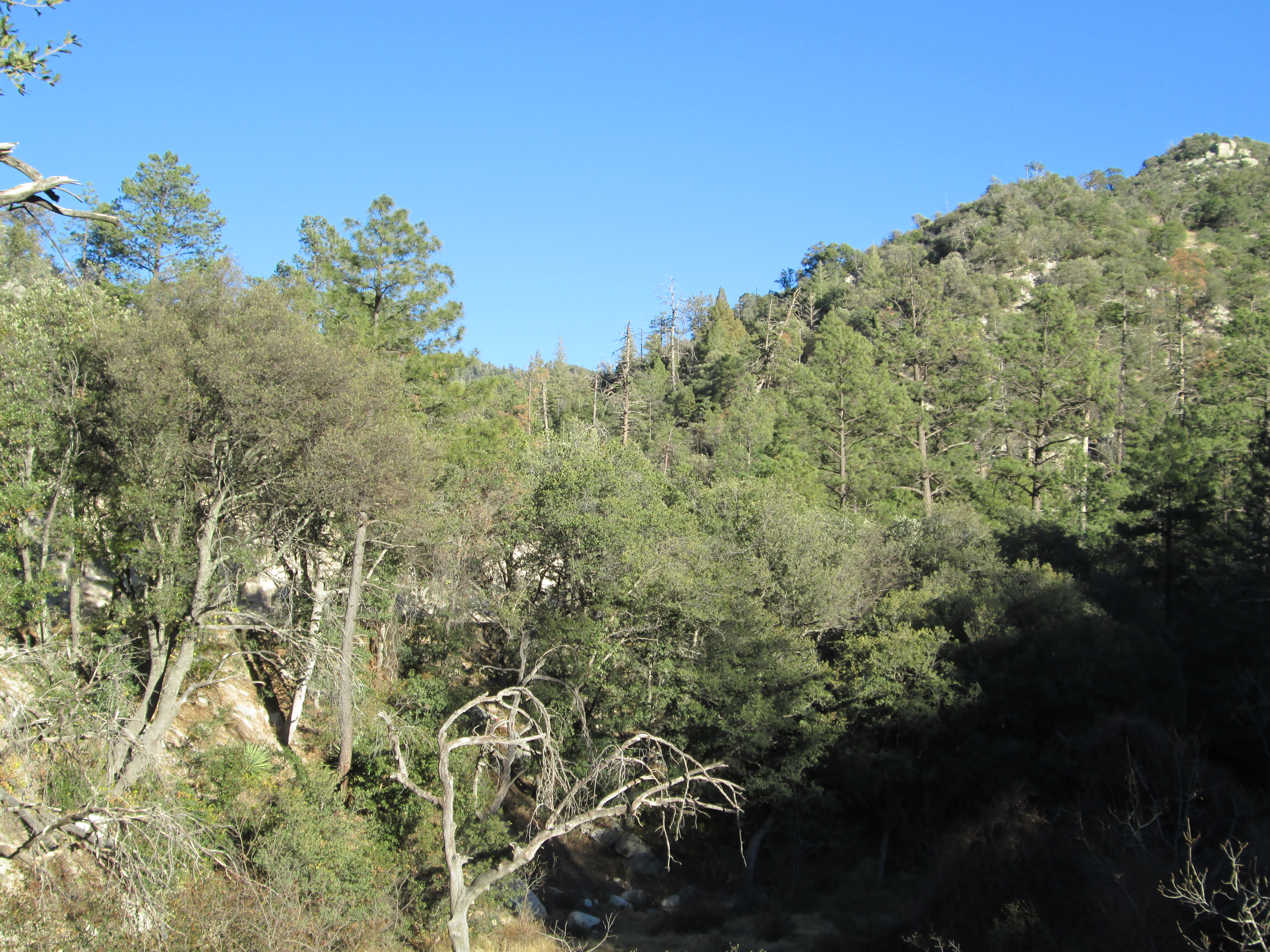
Pine forest in the Santa Catalina Mountains

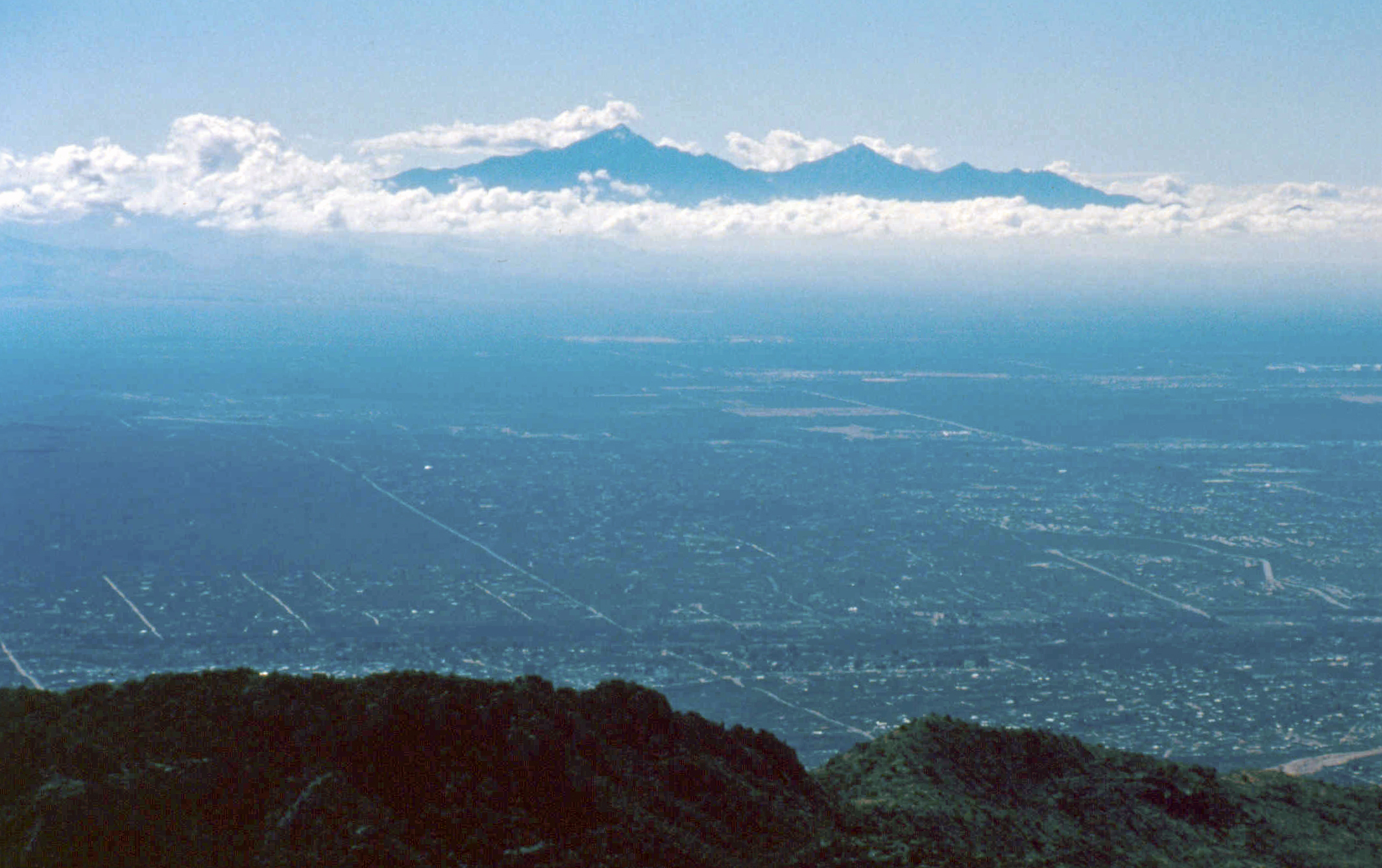
View of "sky islands" from the Catalinas

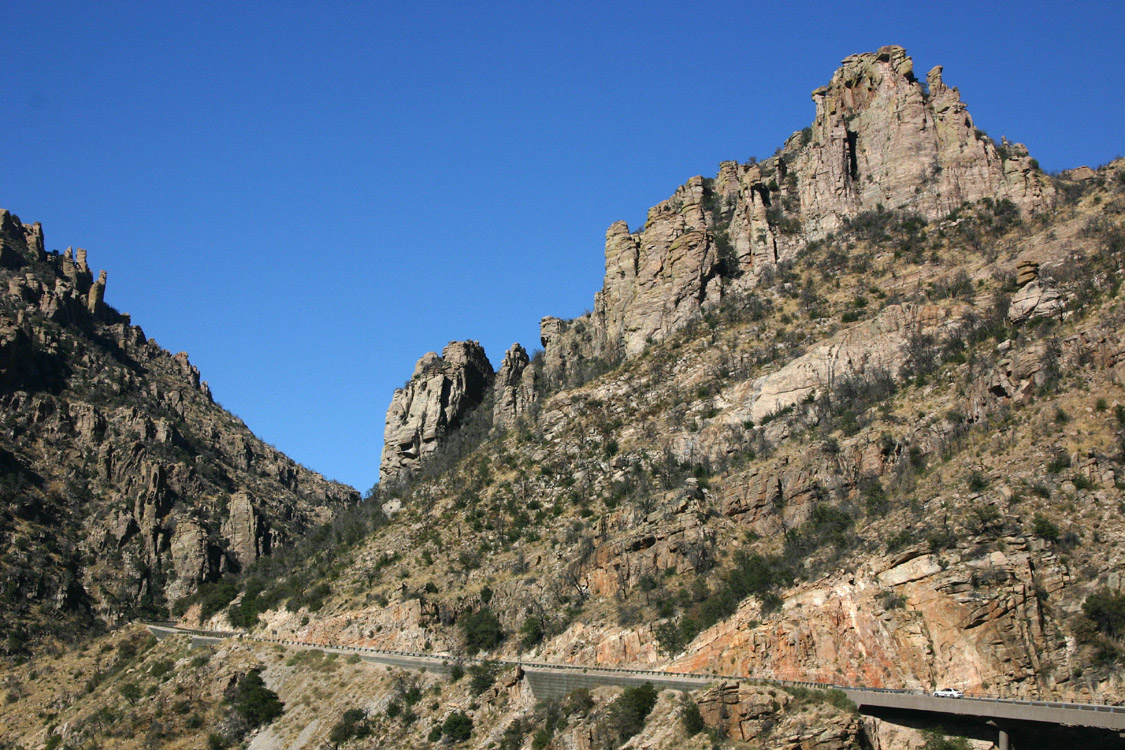
Catalina Highway in the Santa Catalina Mountains

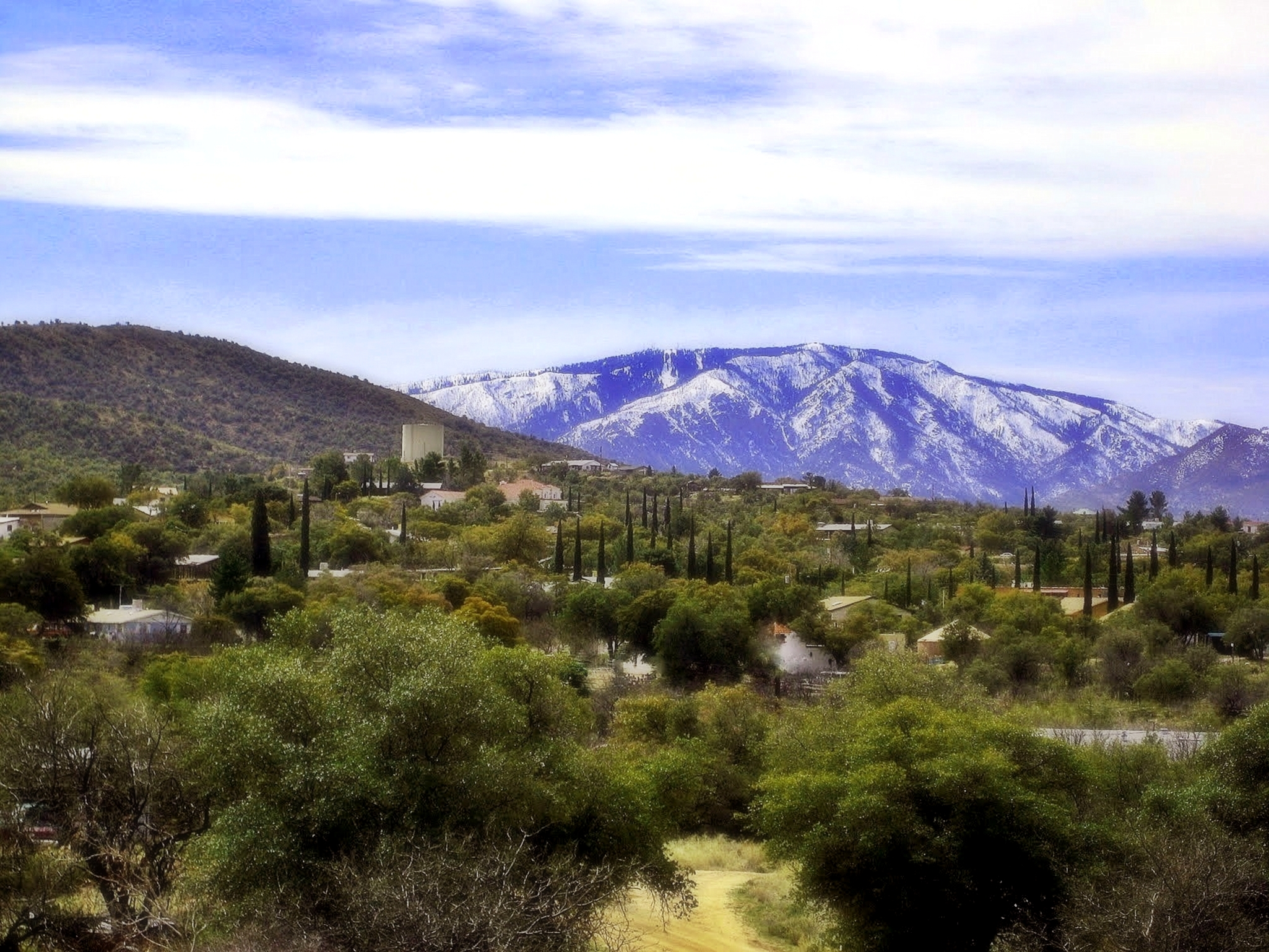
Southern view of Mt. Lemmon from Oracle, Arizona

Northwestern view of the Catalina Mountains as seen from Catalina State Park in Oro Valley

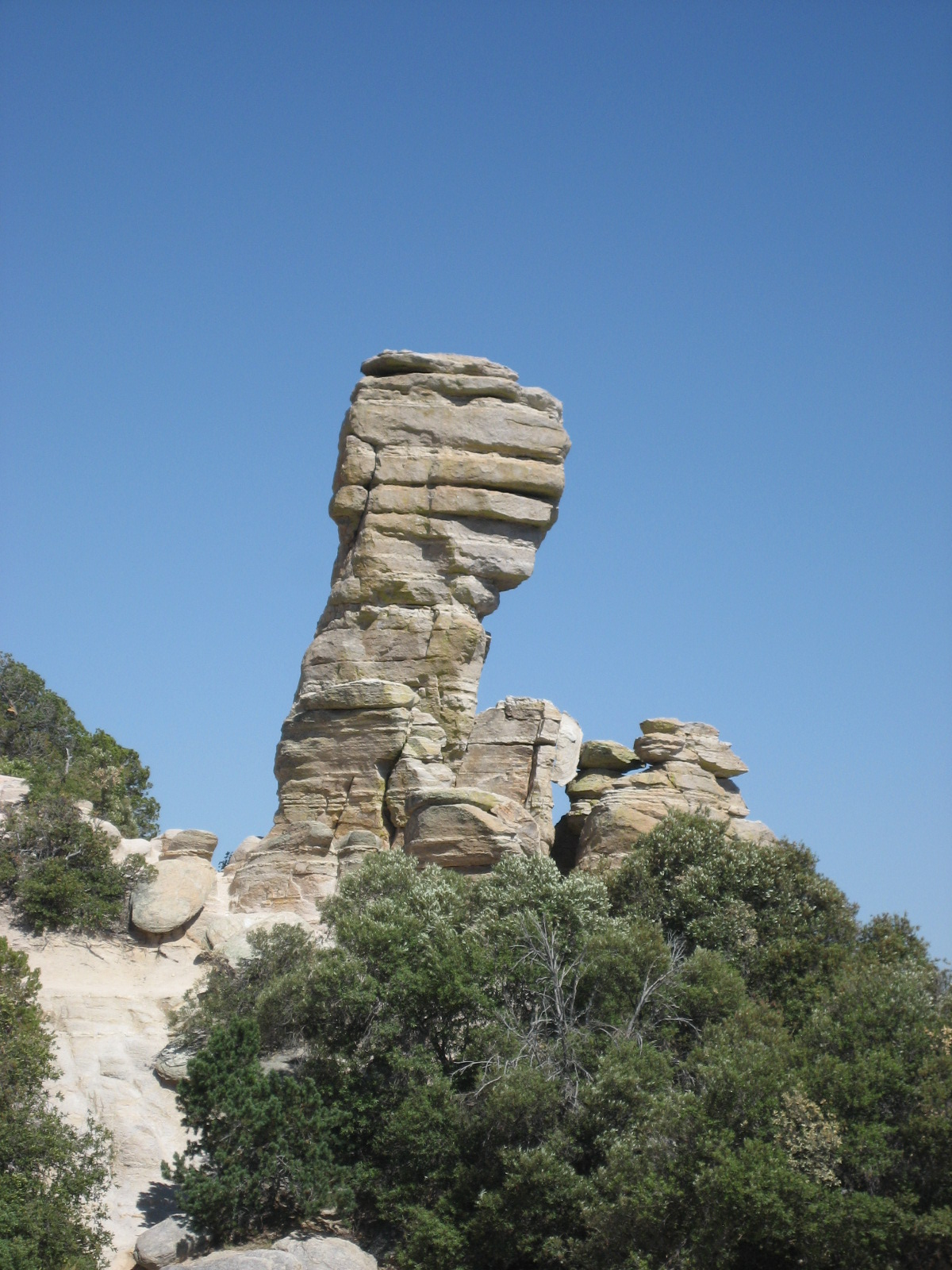
Hitchcock Pinnacle, a hoodoo along Catalina Highway

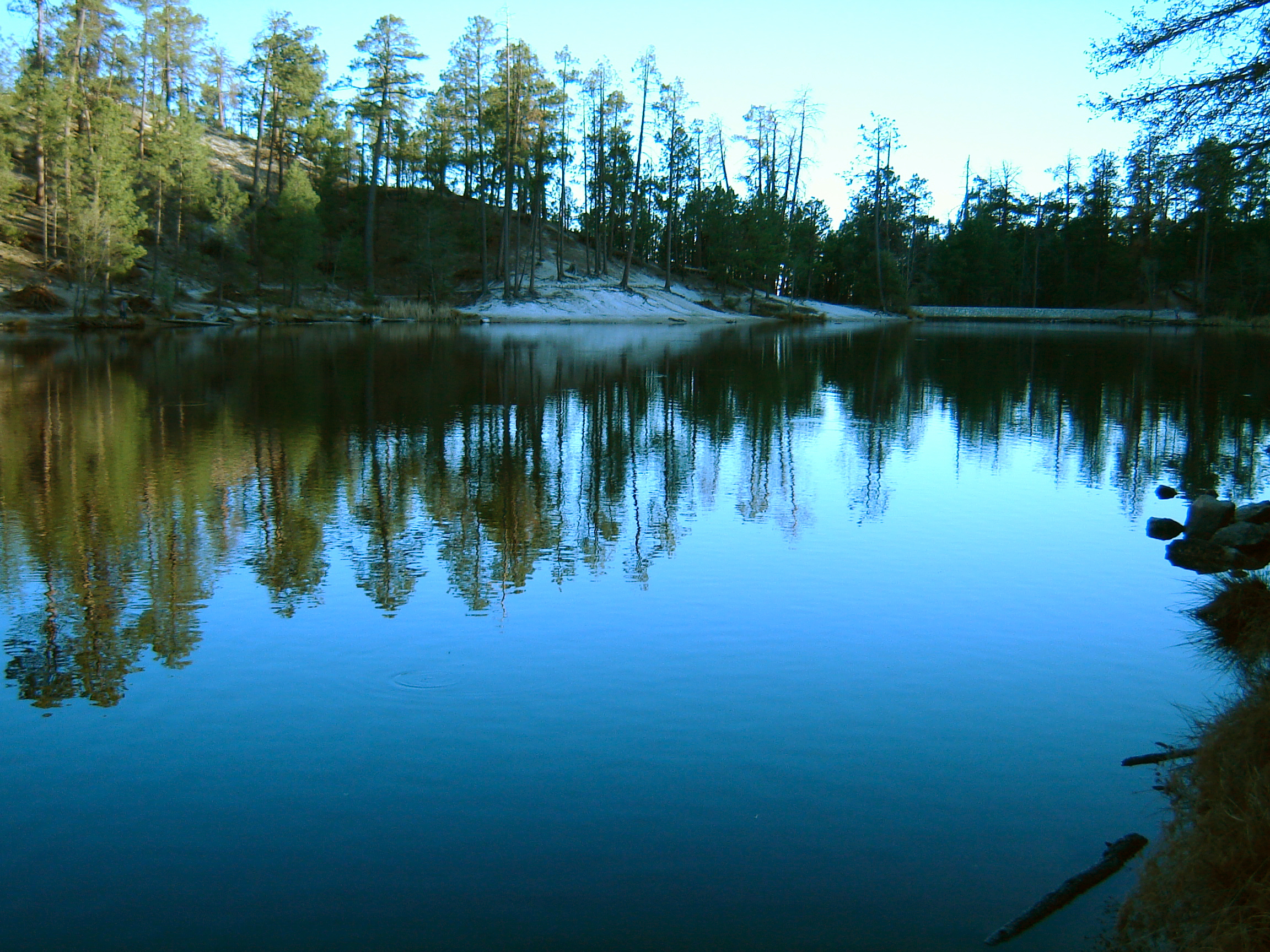
Rose Canyon Lake
