= Catalina State Park =

State park in Arizona, United States

- Catalina State Park in Oro Valley, Arizona

- Location within Arizona
- Interactive map of Catalina State Park
- Location: Oro Valley, Arizona, United States
- Coordinates: 32°25′00″N 110°56′15″W
- Area: 5,493 acres (2,223 ha)
- Elevation: 2,650 ft (810 m)
- Established: 1974
- Administrator: Arizona State Parks & Trails
- Visitors: 186,555 (in 2024)
- Website: Official website

Catalina State Park is located at the base of the Santa Catalina Mountains. It is home to nearly 5,000 saguaros and desert plants. There are 5,500 acres of foothills and canyons that offer opportunities for camping, hiking, and bird watching. The park is home to more than 150 species. At an elevation of nearly 3,000 feet, the park offers miles of trails for recreational use.

== History ==
=== Cultural history ===
There is evidence that the park and surrounding area have been continuously occupied since about 5000 BCE by the Hohokam people. The Romero Ruin still contains pueblos built of rock and adobe, as well as a Mesoamerican ballcourt. The earliest date the pueblo would have lived in the area is between 550–600 CE. The site was widely used for nearly 400 years, estimated around 1000–1450 CE.

The namesake of this ruin, Francisco Romero, built a ranch on the site in the 19th century, and most likely used stone from the previous Hohokam structure to build his house, and fortifications to protect him from the Apache.

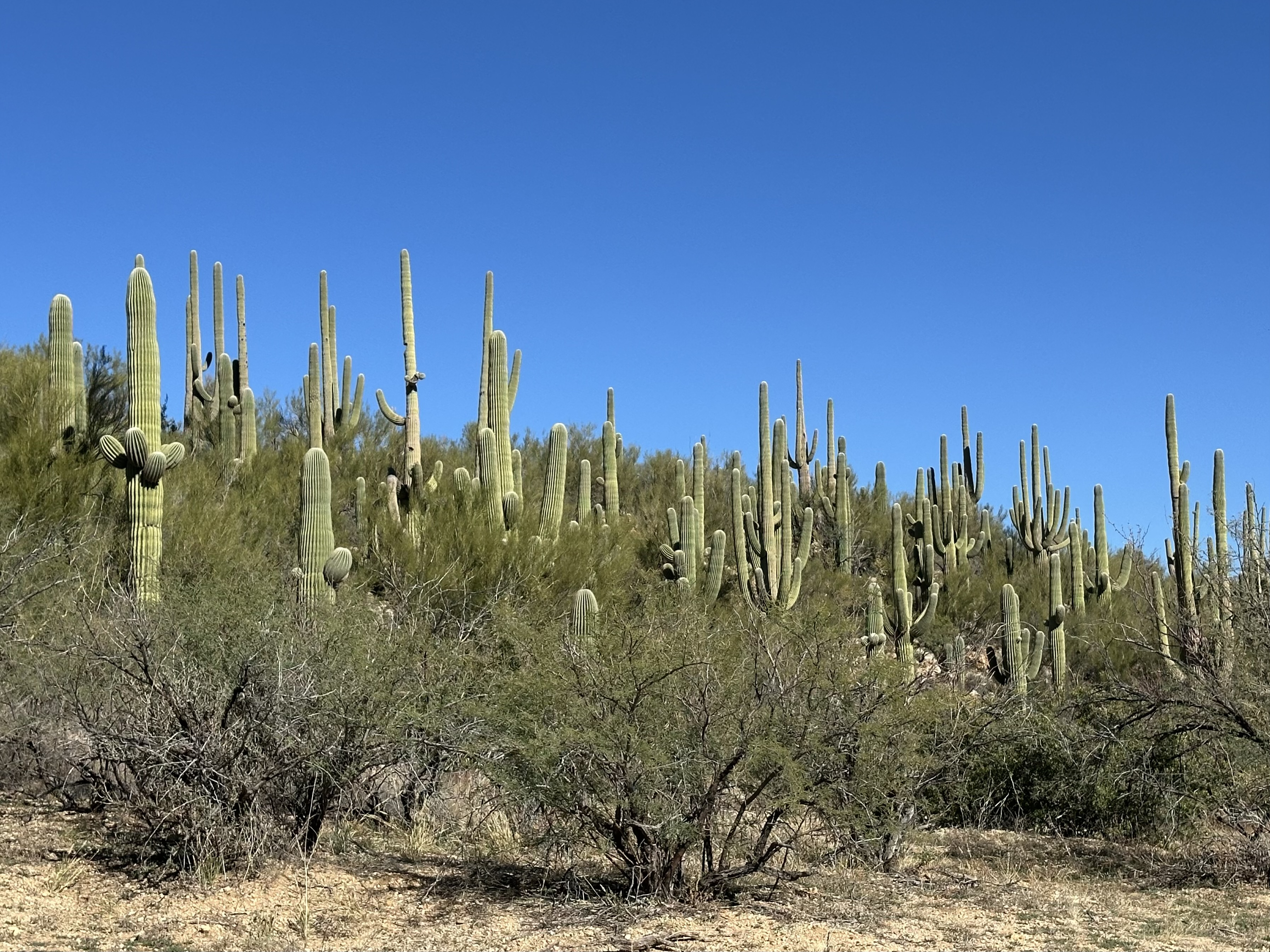
Saguaro cactus are prominent thru out the Catalina State Park.

=== Park establishment ===
Catalina State Park was established through a complex process initiated in the early 1970s, when a proposed housing development on Rancho Romero land met significant public opposition. Representative Charles King requested a feasibility study, leading to legislation passed in 1974. Despite early resistance, a master plan was developed with the help of University of Arizona students. Through land exchanges, leases, and appropriations, the park was eventually dedicated by Governor Bruce Babbitt on May 25, 1983. The park is now managed by Arizona State Parks and Trails under a Special Use Permit from the USDA Forest Service.

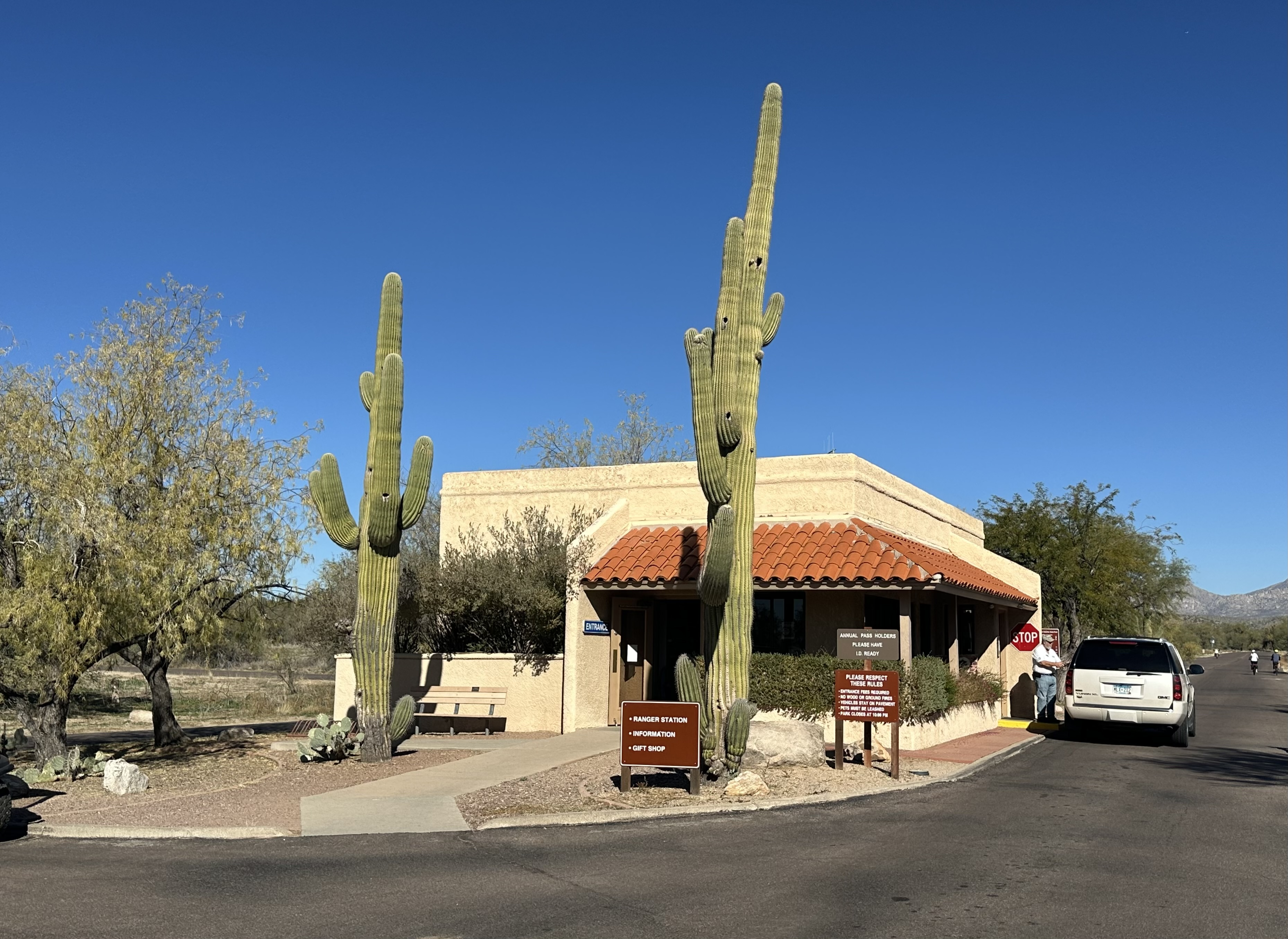
The Ranger Station and gift shop at the entrance to the Catalina State Park.

=== Bighorn fire ===
On June 5, 2020, a lightning strike started the Bighorn Fire which burned through the Santa Catalina Mountains until late July. The Bighorn Fire burned parts of Catalina State Park and caused damage to trails and vegetation.

== Recreation ==
The park is several minutes by car away from the Tucson metropolitan area. The park is home to trails for activities like birding, biking, backpacking and hiking, including Romero Ruin Trail, Nature Trail, Romero Canyon Trail, Sutherland Trail, Canyon Loop Trail, 50-Year Trail, Birding Trail, and the Bridle Trail. Certain trails also connect with other trails in Coronado National Forest, continuing to Mount Lemmon, the highest peak in the Santa Catalina Mountains at 9,157 feet (2,791 m).

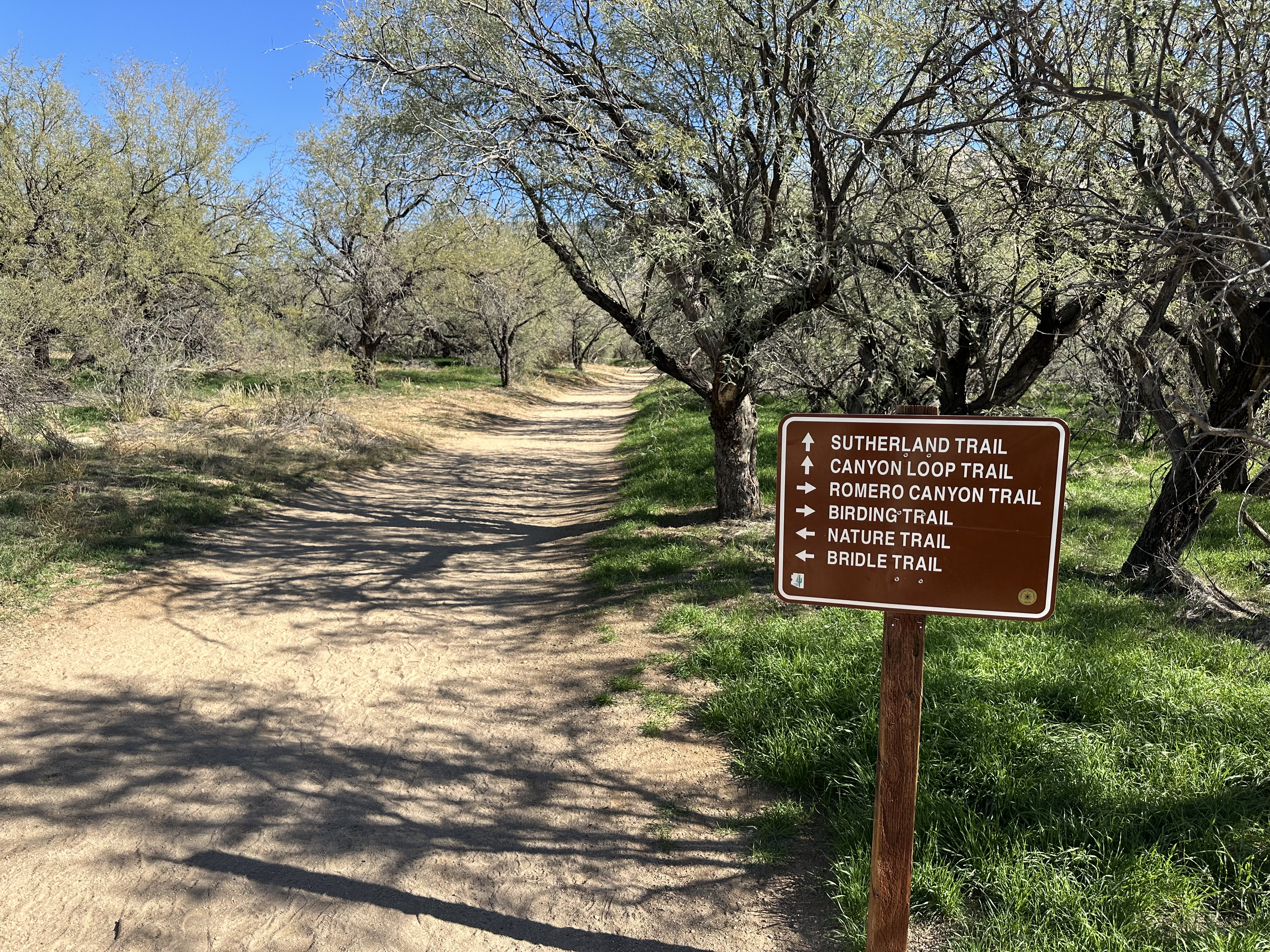
Multiple trails of varying length and degree of difficulty are available at the Catalina State Park.

The park also features several campgrounds and an equestrian center with ample parking for trailers, as specific trails are also open to equestrians.

== See also ==
- List of Arizona state parks
