= Bighorn Fire =

2020 wildfire in Arizona, USA

- Part of the 2020 Arizona wildfires
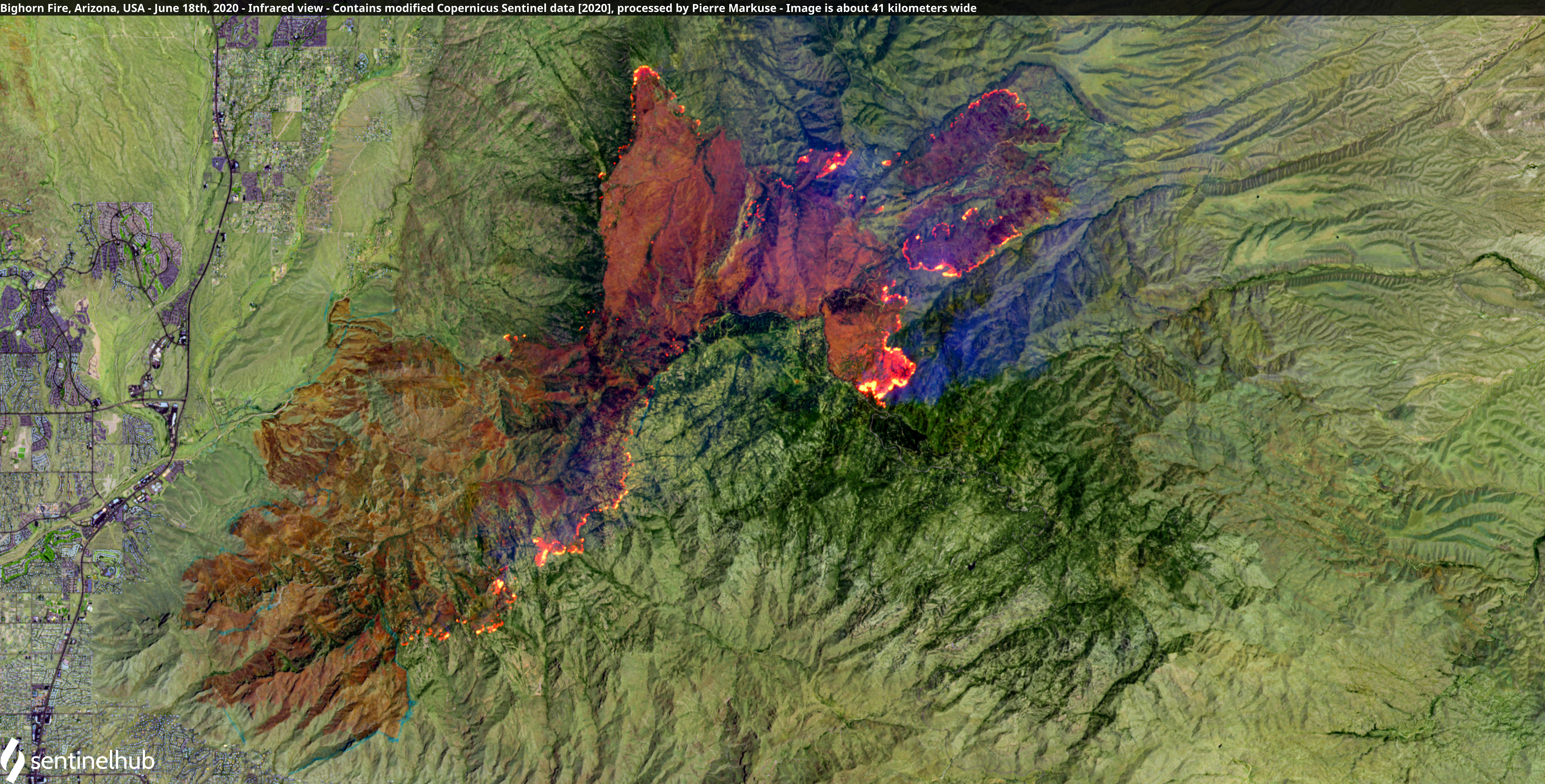
- Bighorn Fire seen from space on satellite image
- Date: June 5, 2020 – July 23, 2020
- Location: Santa Catalina Mountains, near Tucson, Arizona
- Coordinates: 32.378°N 110.943°W

Statistics
- Burned area: 119,987 acres (48,557 ha)

Impacts
- Injuries: 7
- Cost: $37 million

Ignition
- Cause: Lightning

Map
- Location in Arizona

The Bighorn Fire was a wildfire in the Santa Catalina Mountains north of Tucson, Arizona. It burned 119,987 acres (48,557 ha) until it was finally put out on July 23, 2020. A lightning strike from a storm at 9:46 PM on June 5, 2020 caused the fire. The fire was named after the bighorn sheep that inhabit the area.

The fire threatened hundreds of homes and multiple evacuations occurred. The first evacuations occurred in the Catalina Foothills neighborhood in Northern Tucson. The following day, residents in the Oro Valley section of the Catalina Foothills were ordered to evacuate. On June 16, Mount Lemmon and Summerhaven were evacuated. The length of the burn was attributed to rough mountainous terrain and inaccessibility. Additionally, the dry hot weather of the area made it even more difficult to fight the fire. The first storms of Tucson’s monsoon season are credited with helping emergency crews get the fire under control and to eventually put it out.

== Ignition ==
The wildfire began with a lightning strike on June 5, 2020, which was caught on film by a local storm chaser. The location was just below Bighorn Mountain, commonly conflated with nearby Pusch Ridge by the public.

== Exacerbating conditions ==
Because of new protocols to protect firefighting crews from Covid-19, the U.S. Forest Service modified its fire management approach to a "full suppression" effort for all fires, similar to pre-1972 strategies. Despite these efforts for immediate full suppression, the fire spread largely uncontained, encouraged by several factors. The initial fire was partially fueled by invasive grass species including Buffelgrass, known for changing the fire ecology of much of Southern Arizona and the Western United states. The early efforts to control the fire with aircraft (air tankers and helicopters) were impeded by illegal use of drones by the public, resulting in lost opportunities to suppress the fire. Rugged terrain and high temperatures reduced the ability of firefighters to safely work against the fire. High winds, especially on June 12, 14, and 17th, accelerated the fire and pushed it over fire lines and roads. Dry conditions, drought, and delayed summer rains also contributed to drier fuels and heightened fire activity.
