= Romero Canyon =

Landform in Pima County, Arizona

Coordinates: 32.4322964°N 110.8878765°W

Not to be confused with the Romero Canyon in the Los Padres National Forest of California.

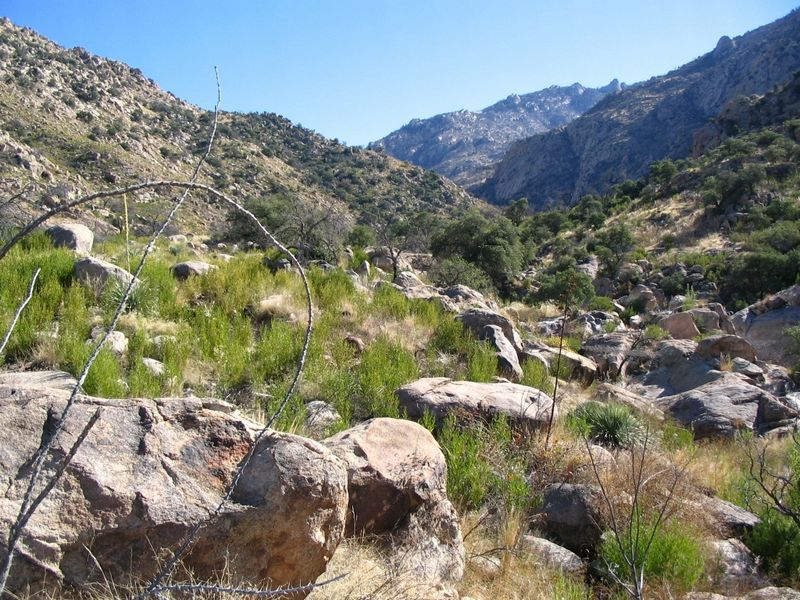
Looking up Romero Canyon

Romero Canyon is located in the Santa Catalina Mountains and part of the Coronado National Forest. A stream flows through the bottom that has become a popular tourist destination. The Romero Canyon Trail runs through the canyon.
