= Redington Pass =

Mountain pass in Pima County, Arizona

- Interactive map of Redington Pass
- Elevation: 1,310 m (4,300 ft)

Third Approach
- Location: (eastern)-Sonoran Desert; Madrean Sky Islands; Pima County, Arizona, United States
- Range: Santa Catalina Mountains-N & NW; Rincon Mountains-S
- Coordinates: 32.3075°N 110.6°W

Redington Pass (el. 1310 m./4300 ft.) is a high mountain pass between the Santa Catalina Mountains and the Rincons in northeast Pima County, Arizona. It is located just east of Tucson. Historically, it was the connection between the farming and ranching areas of Redington along the San Pedro River on the east side of the pass and Tucson on the west side.

The road through Redington Pass is unpaved and the area throughout the pass is a favorite of mountain bikers and all-terrain vehicle riders. The area was also frequented by firearms enthusiasts, as the region contained three unofficial shooting range areas. As of 2013 these unofficial shooting ranges have been shut down by federal officials due to litter and noise pollution. The west side of the pass near Tanque Verde Falls affords views overlooking the east side of the city of Tucson, spread out across the Sonoran Desert floor below.
