= Tanque Verde Falls =

Waterfalls in Pima County, Arizona

Coordinates: 32°15′16″N 110°39′21″W

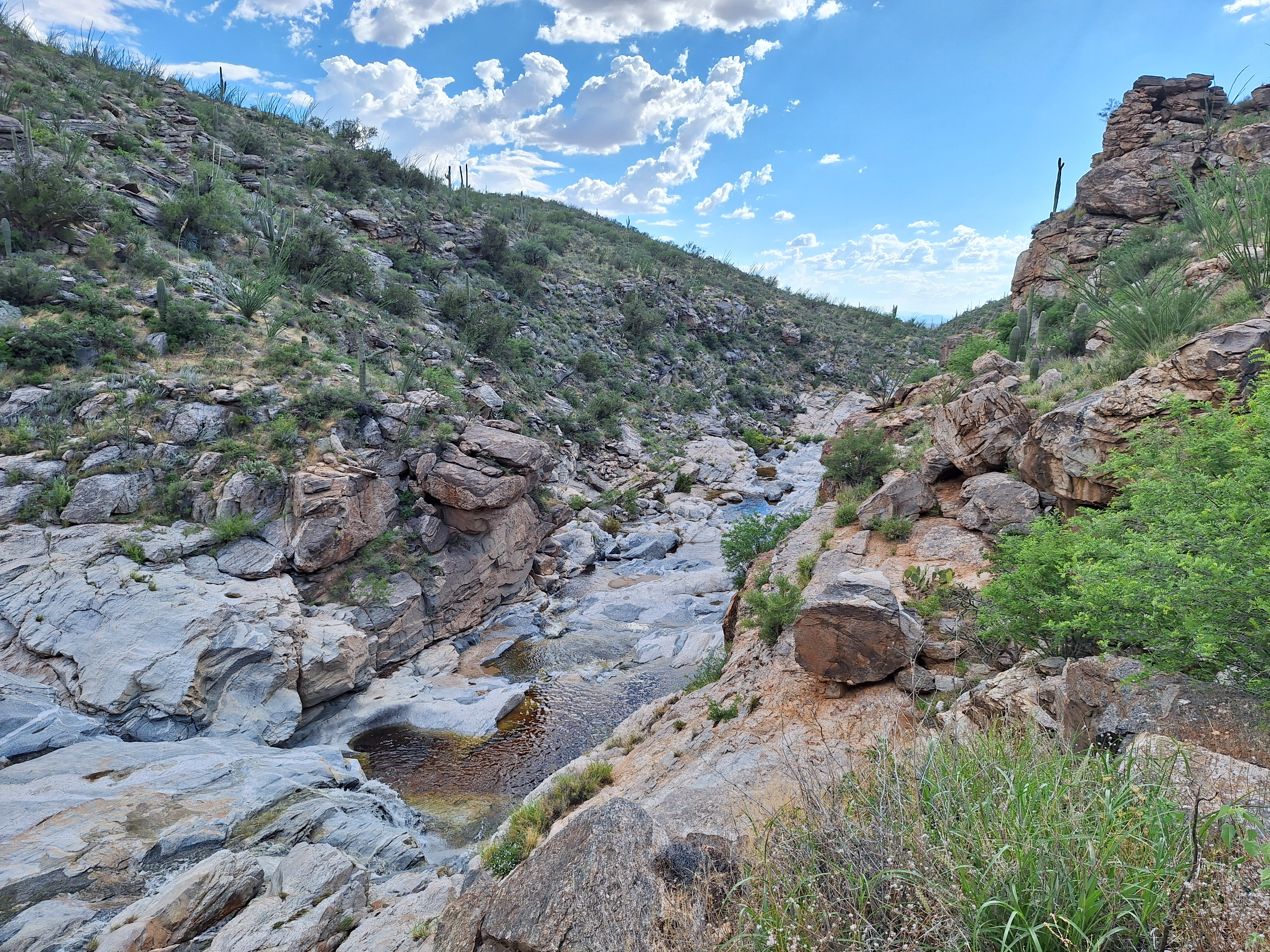
Looking down Tanque Verde Canyon from the top of the falls

Tanque Verde Falls are a series of seasonal waterfalls in Tanque Verde Canyon east of Tanque Verde, Arizona and Tucson, Arizona. Tanque Verde Ridge of the Rincon Mountains lies to the south and Agua Caliente Hill to the north. The falls lie south of Redington Road which connects the Tucson Basin to the southwest with the San Pedro River valley to the east.

A parking area and hiking trail for the falls is maintained by the Southern Arizona Hiking Club, and was significantly improved in 2024 by the US Forest Service. Despite the maintained trail and proximity to medical resources the falls are quite dangerous, with at least 30 recorded deaths from falls and flooding.

== See also ==
- List of waterfalls
