= Rose Canyon Lake =

Waterbody in Pima County, Arizona

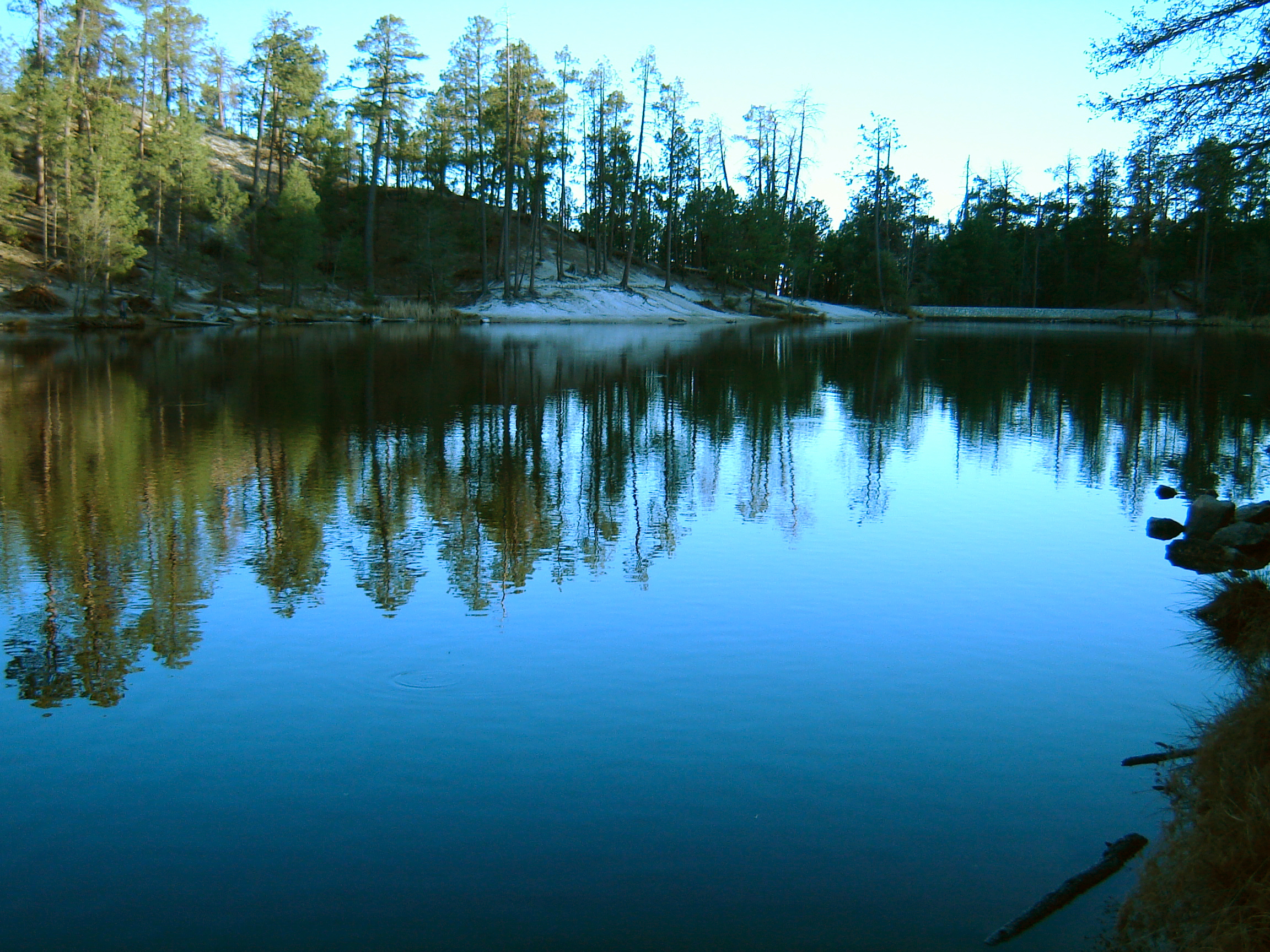

- Location within Arizona
- Location: Santa Catalina Mountains, Pima County, Arizona, United States
- Coordinates: 32°23′13″N 110°42′41″W
- Type: Reservoir
- Basin countries: United States
- Surface area: 7 acres (2.8 ha)
- Average depth: 44 ft (13 m)
- Surface elevation: 7,000 ft (2,100 m)

Rose Canyon Lake is located 30 miles (48 km) northeast of Tucson, Arizona in the Santa Catalina Mountains on Mount Lemmon.

== Fish species ==
- Rainbow Trout
- Brown Trout

The Arizona Game and Fish Department stocks Rose Canyon Lake with catchable rainbow trout once monthly from March through October. Brown trout fingerlings are stocked once annually in late fall.

== Invasive Species ==
- Virile Crayfish

== Gallery ==
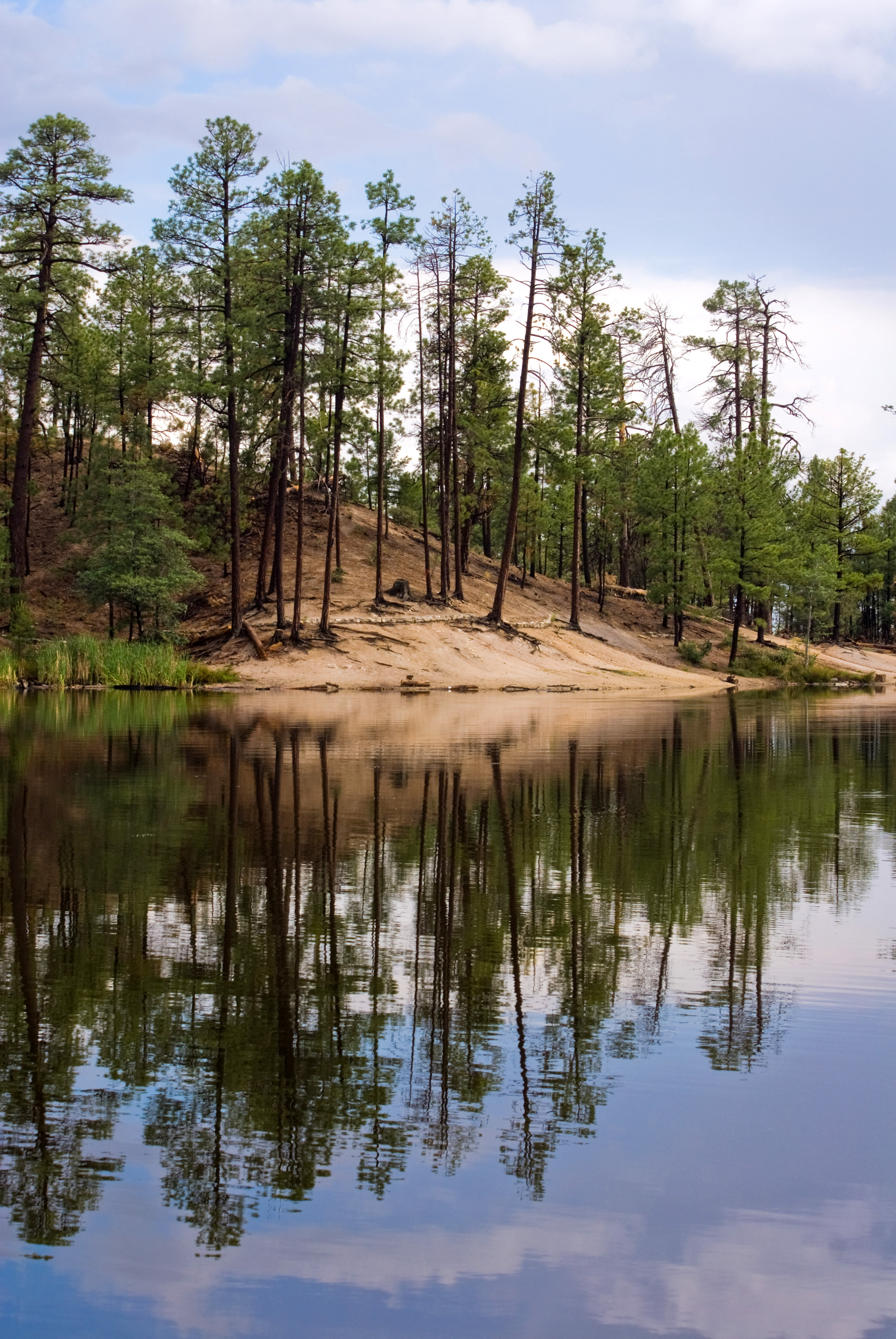
Ponderosa Pine Forest surrounding Rose Canyon Lake

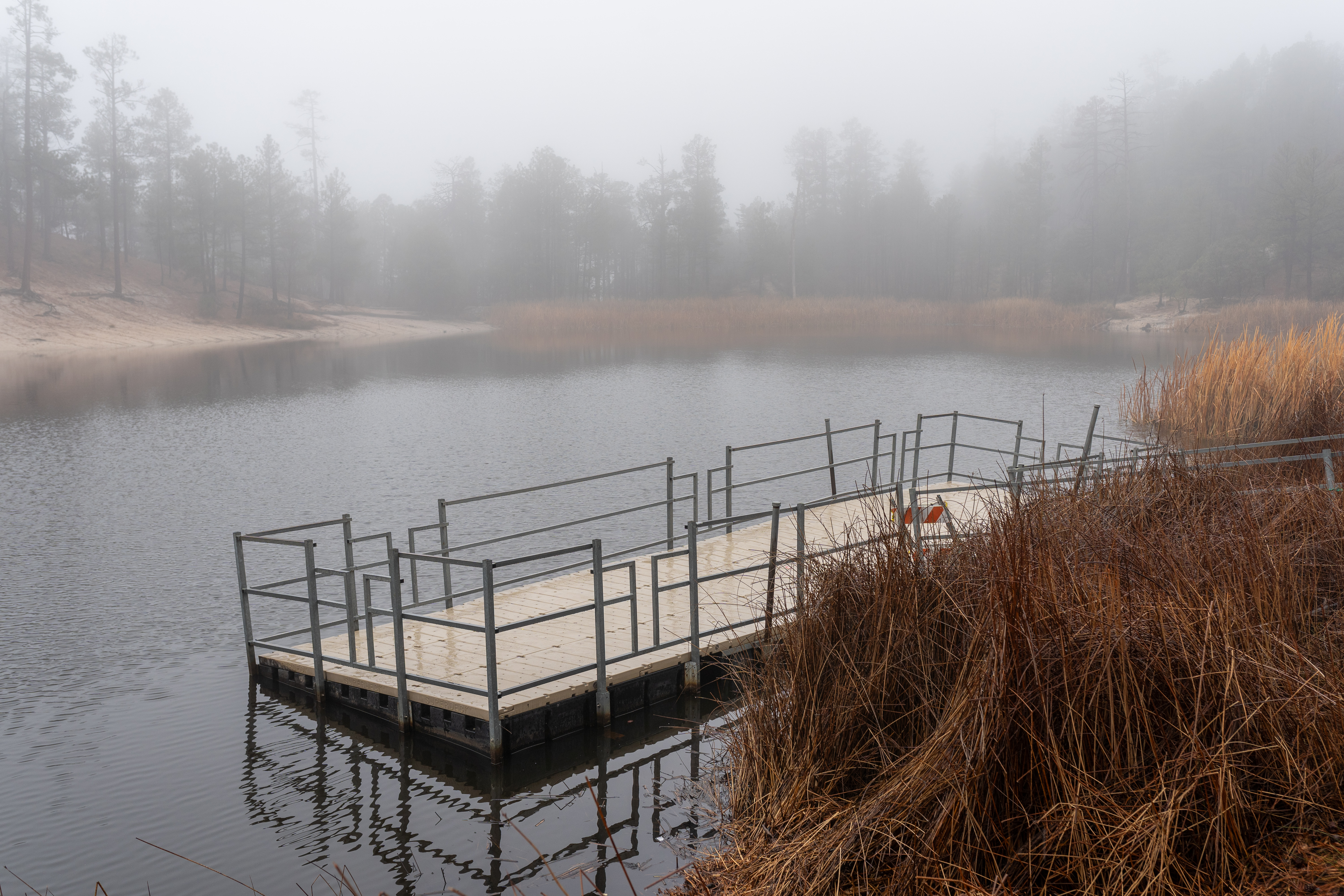
The floating dock at Rose Canyon Lake during the winter of 2026
