= Bear Canyon =

Landform in Pima County, Arizona

Coordinates: 32°18′57″N 110°47′12″W

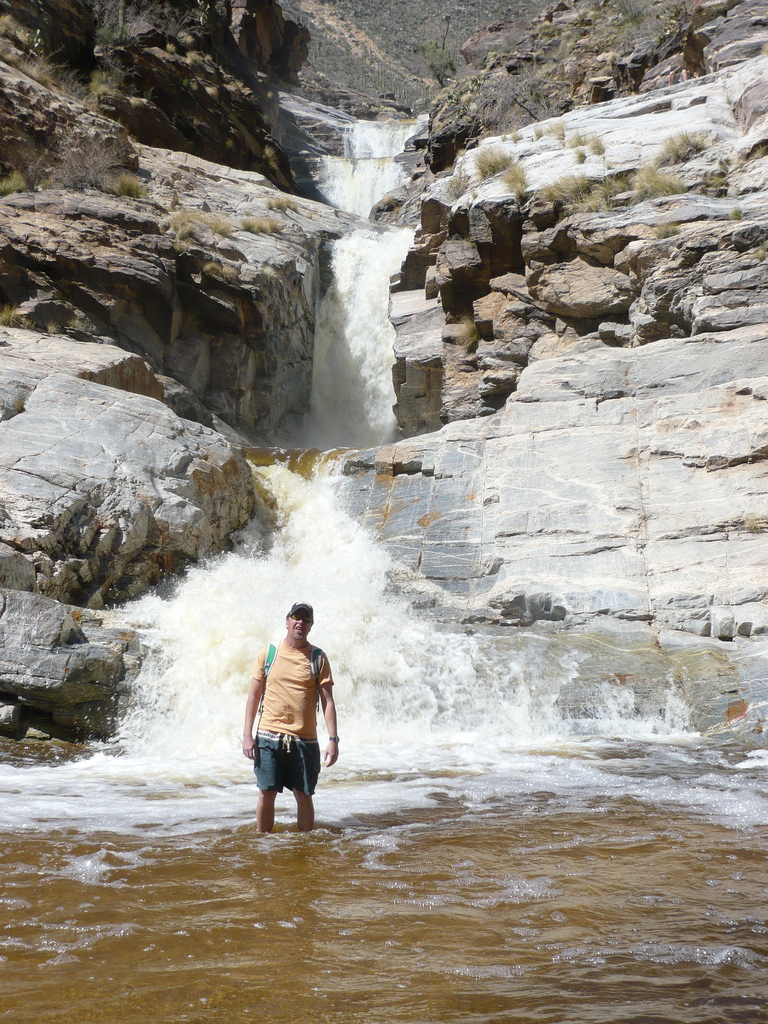
Base of Seven Falls, March 2010

Bear Canyon, located in the Sabino Canyon recreation area of the Coronado National Forest near Tucson, Arizona, offers views of the Santa Catalina Mountains to the north. Accessible by tram or foot from the Sabino Canyon visitors' center, Bear Canyon contains such attractions as the seasonal Seven Falls and Thimble Peak.
