= Pusch Ridge =

Mountains in Arizona, United States

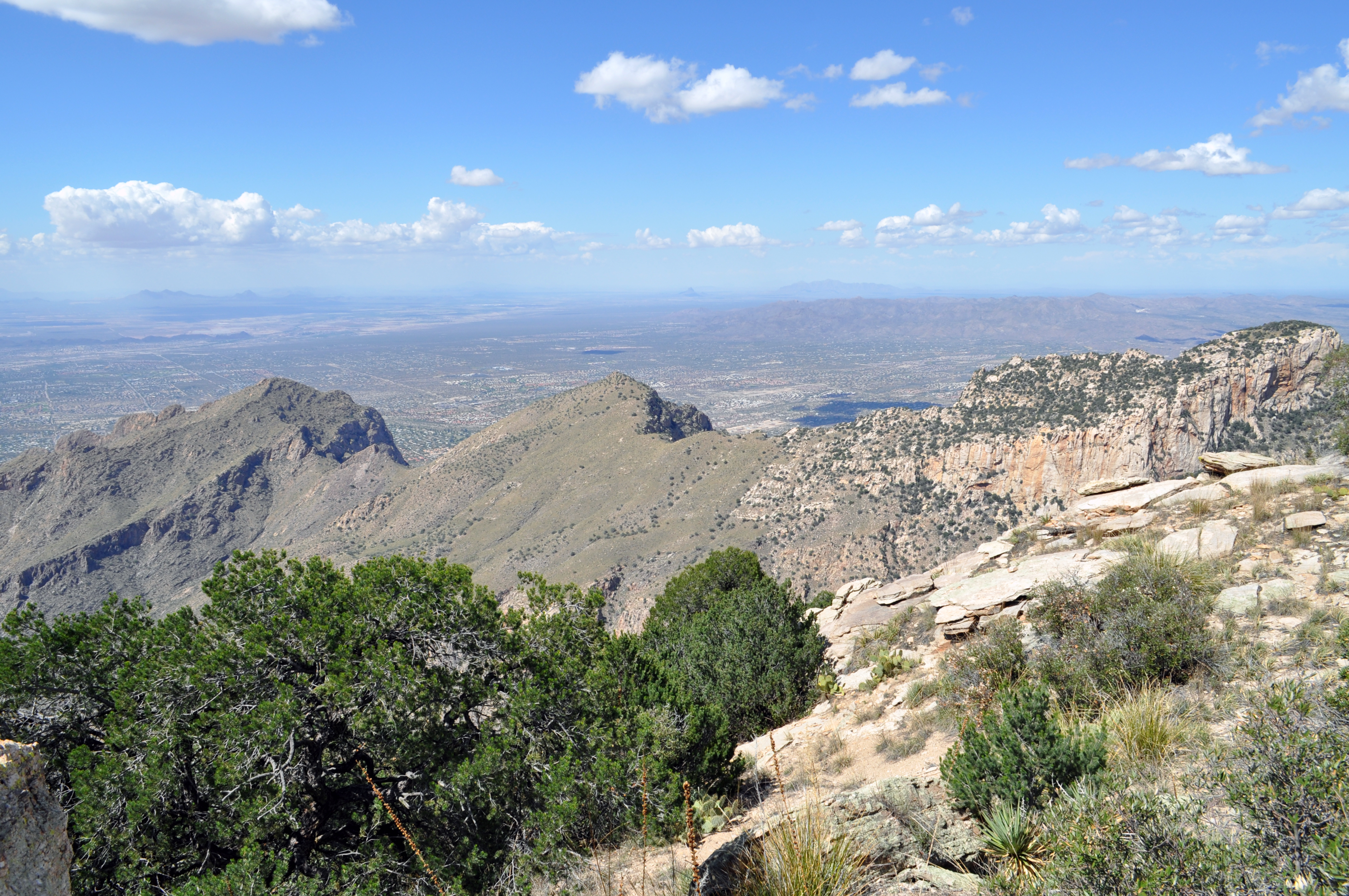
- Pusch Ridge from the western summit of Prominent Point

Highest point
- Peak: Pusch Peak
- Elevation: 5,366 ft (1,636 m) NAVD 88
- Prominence: 841 ft (256 m)
- Coordinates: 32°22′19″N 110°56′21″W

Geography
- Location: Tucson, Pima County, Arizona, U.S.
- Parent range: Santa Catalina Mountains
- Topo map: USGS Tucson North

Pusch Ridge is the most prominent feature in the Pusch Ridge Wilderness Area of the Santa Catalina Mountains, managed by the Coronado National Forest north of Tucson, Arizona, in the United States.

== History ==
Pusch Ridge was named after pioneer George Pusch (1847–1921), who came to Arizona from Germany in the 1870s, and established the Steam Pump Ranch on the Cañada del Oro near the base of the ridge in 1874 in what is now the town of Oro Valley. Steam Pump Ranch was one of the largest cattle ranches in the Territory of Arizona. George Pusch also served as a state legislator and one of the delegates to the original Arizona Constitutional Convention in 1910.

== Peaks ==
Pusch Ridge is primarily made up of three distinct peaks, including (from southwest to northeast in orientation) Pusch Peak, Bighorn Mountain, and Table Mountain. Pusch Peak is the westernmost point in the Santa Catalina Mountains, and rises in elevation over 2,000 feet (610 m) to a peak elevation of 5,366 feet (1,636 m). Bighorn Mountain rises to an elevation about 5,662 feet (1,726 m) at the summit. Table Mountain rises in elevation to 6,265 feet (1,910 m). A minor peak, known as The Cleaver, is located between Pusch Peak and Bighorn Mountain, rising to a summit of about 4,912 feet (1,497 m).

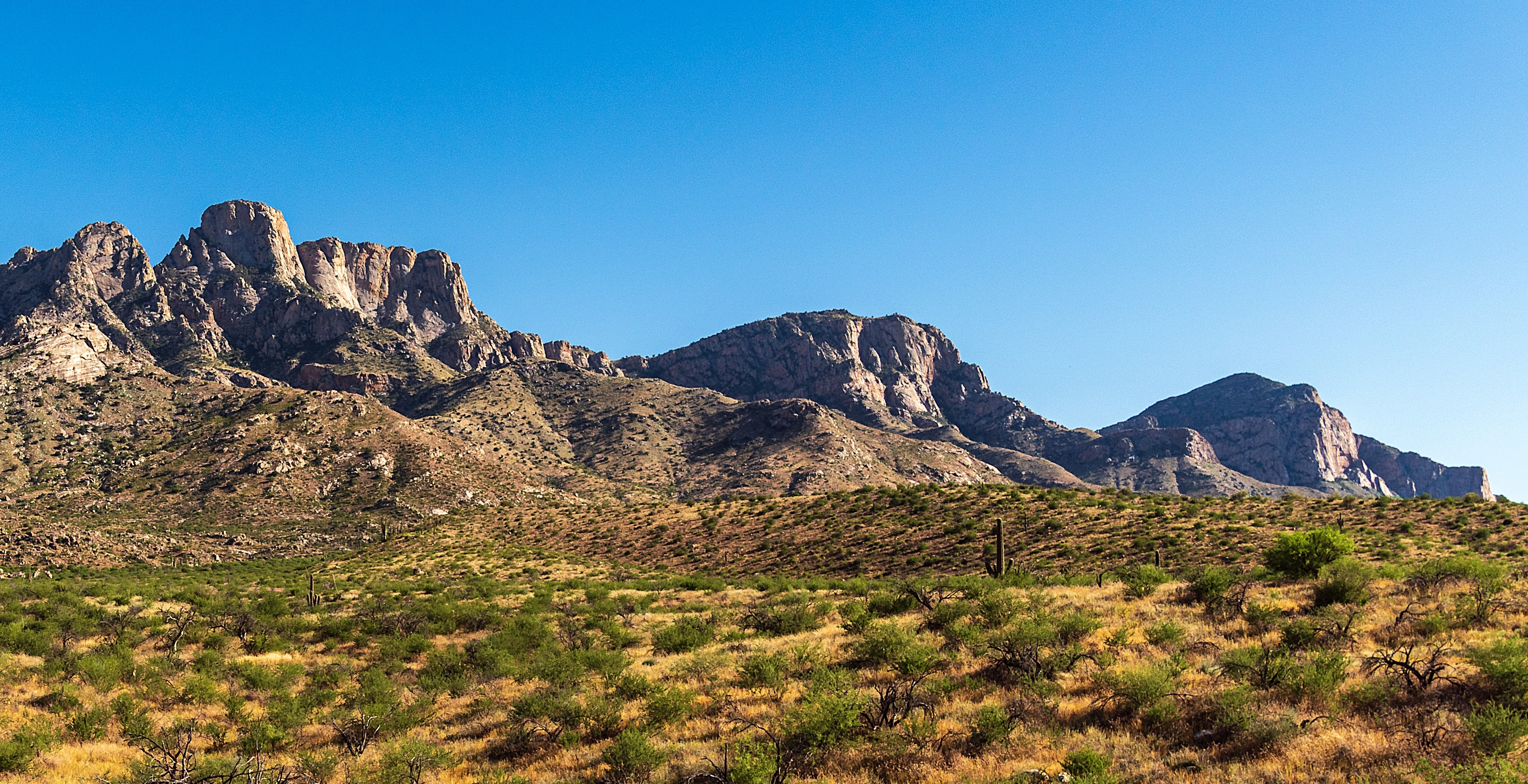
Pusch Ridge viewed from the north. Table Mountain (left), Bighorn Mountain (middle), Pusch Peak (right)

== Wildlife and environment ==
Pusch Ridge was home to one of the last populations of Desert Bighorn Sheep in Arizona, none have been observed since 2005. In a controversial effort to re-establish the Bighorn Sheep population, on November 18, 2013, thirty-one Bighorns were released by Arizona Game and Fish officers near Pusch Ridge, the first in a series of three planned releases totaling about 100 animals over the next two years. Pusch Ridge is noted for dramatic ridges, deep canyons, and extensive biodiversity in elevation changes. Pusch Ridge also provides sweeping views of Oro Valley to the west, and Tucson to the south. On June 5, 2020, prior to midnight a thunderstorm produced lightning that ignited a brush fire on the Bighorn Peak burning approximately 40 acres within 12 hours. Helicopters were deployed to drop water on the fire. The Bighorn Fire continued to spread through the Catalinas and ended up becoming one of the largest wildfires in Arizona history.

== Trailhead ==
The Pusch Ridge Trailhead is located within the town of Oro Valley, accessed from East Linda Vista Boulevard just east of North Oracle Road (State Route 77) (formerly U.S. 89), six miles north of Tucson. Restrictions on hiking Pusch Ridge apply during certain times due to the potential impact on the breeding activities of the Bighorn Sheep in the area.

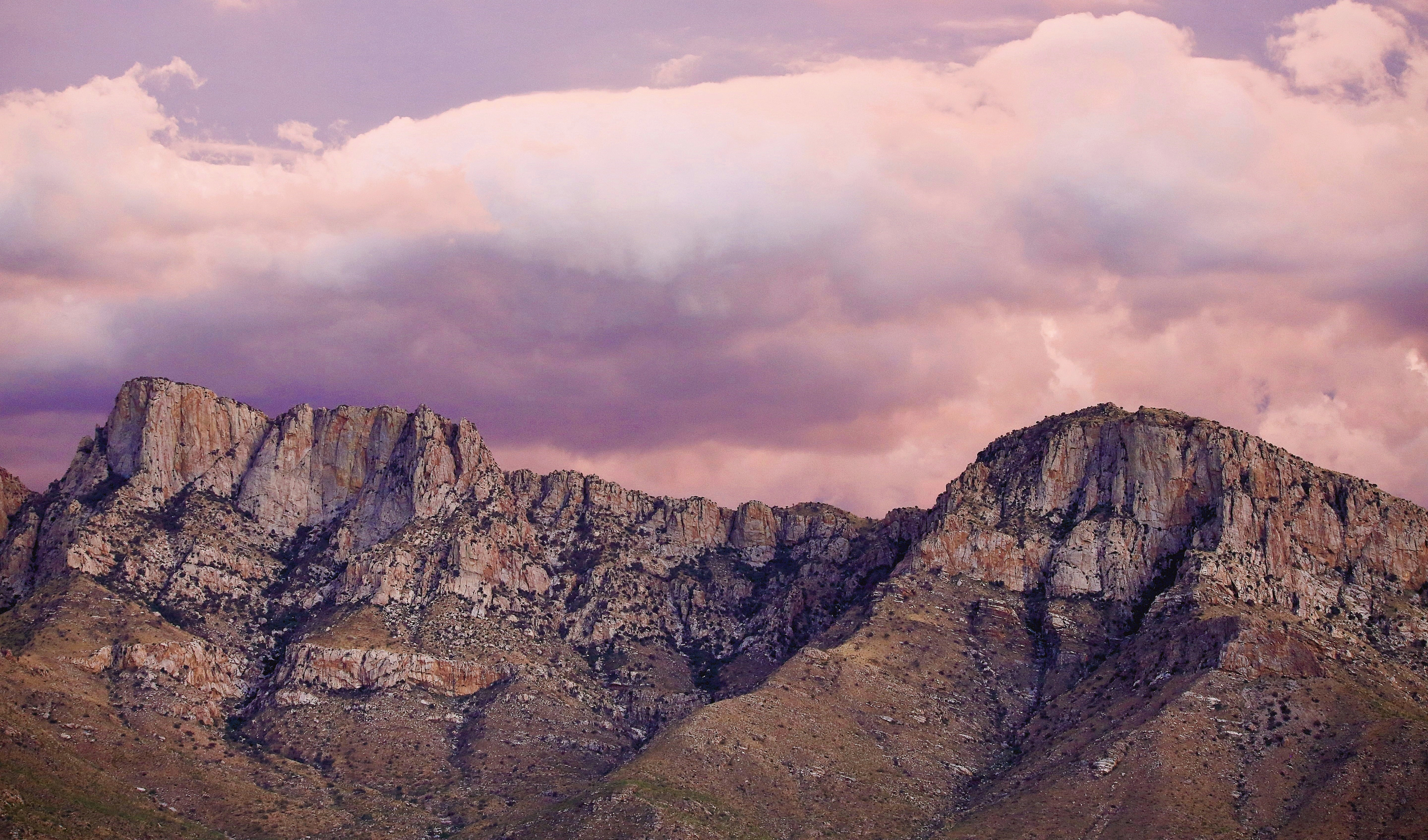
Table Mountain (left) and Bighorn Mountain (right) of Pusch Ridge
