= Pusch Ridge Wilderness Area =

Protected area in Pima County, Arizona

Pusch Ridge Wilderness
- IUCN category Ib (wilderness area)
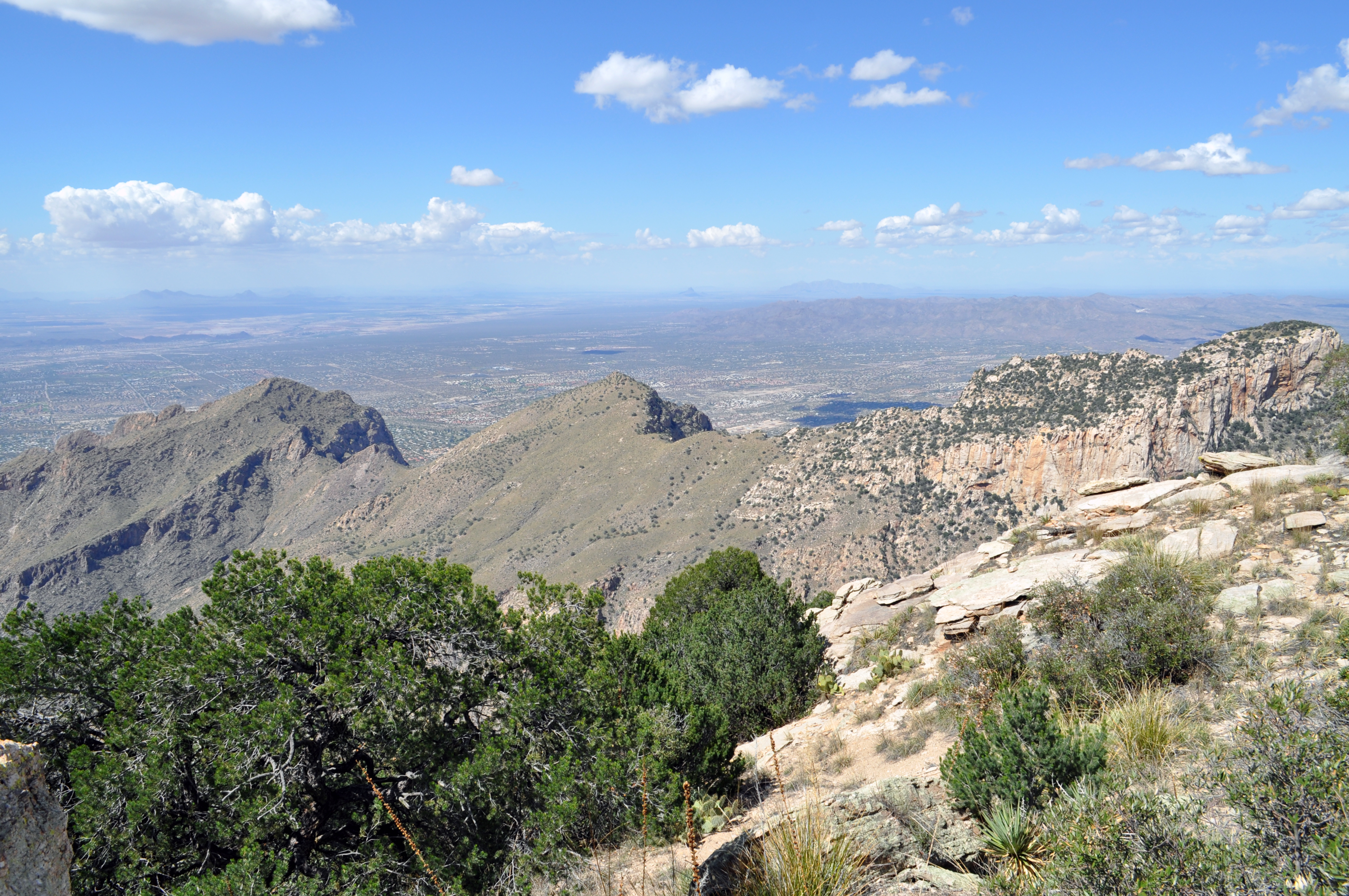
- Pusch Ridge from the western summit of Prominent Point

- Location within the United States
- Location: Pima County, Arizona, USA
- Nearest city: Catalina Foothills, Arizona
- Coordinates: 32°22′0″N 110°49′0″W
- Area: 56,430 acres (228.4 km^{2})
- Established: 1978
- Governing body: U.S. Forest Service

Pusch Ridge Wilderness Area is a 56,430 acre (228.36 km^{2}) wilderness area. It is located within the Coronado National Forest in the Santa Catalina Mountains north of Tucson, Arizona, United States. Established in 1978, the area varies greatly in elevation and biodiversity, rising from 2,800 feet to over 9,100 feet in elevation.

The area was originally created in an ill-fated effort to preserve and protect the sensitive Desert Bighorn Sheep population on Pusch Ridge, one of the last remaining populations in Arizona. Due in part to increased residential and commercial development around the Santa Catalina Mountains in Oro Valley and the Catalina Foothills, however, the Desert Bighorn Sheep population in the wilderness area has dwindled dramatically, and sightings have nearly ceased in recent years. In November 2013, 31 adult bighorn sheep were reintroduced to the area. In early February 2014, 2 lambs were spotted by an Arizona Game and Fish Department official. These two are the first Catalina-born desert bighorn sheep in nearly 25 years.

Plant life at lower elevations includes saguaro cactus and other desert plants. Trees found at mid-level elevations include mountain mahogany, juniper and pinyon pine. Forests of fir and aspen grow above 8,000 feet.

In the middle of the Santa Catalina mountains there is a dome-shaped core of Catalina granite. The south face of the mountains is formed by Wilderness granite, characterized by with bands of white, resistant rock that form steep cliffs.

== See also ==
- Wilderness Act
- List of Arizona Wilderness Areas
