= Tanque Verde High School =

Public school in Tucson, Arizona

Location
- 4201 North Melpomene Way; Tucson, Arizona 85749; United States; 32°17′08″N 110°45′21″W

Information
- Type: Public secondary (U.S.)
- Established: 2005 (21 years ago)
- Oversight: Tanque Verde Unified School District
- CEEB code: 030600
- Principal: Amy Cislak
- Teaching staff: 42.60 (FTE)
- Grades: 9–12
- Enrollment: 825 (2025-2026)
- Student to teacher ratio: 17.14
- Campus size: 40 acres (160,000 m^{2})
- Campus type: Suburban
- Colors: Silver, black, and green
- Mascot: Hawks
- Website: tvhs.tanqueverdeschools.org

Tanque Verde High School is a comprehensive public high school located in the suburban community of Tanque Verde northeast of Tucson, Arizona. Tanque Verde is the only high school in the Tanque Verde Unified School District. Tanque Verde was established in 2005 under the Twenty First Century School model designed by Bill Gates and the Bill and Melinda Gates Foundation. The school's first graduating class had their commencement May 21, 2008 with 20 students, all receiving various honors and scholarships for college.

The school and community name (Spanish for Green Tank) originates from a prominent and algae-filled stock watering tank in the area in the late 19th century. The school mascot is the Hawk, and the school colors are green, black, and silver.

Tanque Verde is statistically one of the highest academically achieving schools in Arizona. Since 2006 the school has been academically classified as Excelling by the Arizona Department of Education (top 10 percent in Arizona).

== School history ==
Prior to the establishment of Tanque Verde High School, district students in grades 10–12 attended nearby Sabino High School in the Tucson Unified School District. The establishment of Tanque Verde High School was a considerable controversy in the community. The school district endured a recall election when the school board split on whether to build a high school on North Catalina Highway. One member, a proponent of the high school, was voted out of office in favor of a replacement candidate who shifted the board majority to opposition of the high school. The proposed site was abandoned. However, the school board ultimately voted to open the high school on the same campus as Emily Gray Junior High School, avoiding the need to acquire a separate high school site. As of the 2011–12 school year, Emily Gray Junior High was relocated to a new campus.

== Academics ==
The curriculum at Tanque Verde has been designed to meet the high academic standards of the community. It also currently boasts a Presidential Award for Excellence in Mathematics and Science Teaching recipient, Dr. Grayzna Zreda.

== Athletics ==
Tanque Verde presently competes in the Arizona Interscholastic Association 3A Conference. The school has won two baseball championships, in 2009 and 2011. Cheerleading won first place at Cactus Cup State Competition and placed in fifth at West Coast Regional Championship for small Co-Ed Varsity in the 2011–2012 school year.

== Attendance boundaries ==
The Tanque Verde School District encompasses 77 square miles (200 km^{2}) on the far northeast side of the Tucson Metropolitan Area.

=== Feeder schools ===
As the district's only high school, all schools within the district are located within the high school attendance area. Elementary schools include Agua Caliente and Tanque Verde. Emily Gray Junior High School is the only middle school in the Tanque Verde School District. The district-wide enrollment is 1,457 students.
