= Catalina Highway =

Scenic route in Pima County, Arizona

Catalina Highway
- General Hitchcock Highway, Sky Island Scenic Byway, Mt Lemmon Highway
- Catalina Highway highlighted in red

Route information
- Maintained by US Forest Service
- Length: 27 mi (43 km)
- Existed: 1933–present
- Tourist routes: Sky Island Parkway

Major junctions
- South end: Tanque Verde Road in Tucson
- North end: Near the summit of Mount Lemmon

Location
- Country: United States
- State: Arizona
- Counties: Pima, Arizona

Highway system
- Scenic Byways; National; National Forest; BLM; NPS; Arizona State Highway System; Interstate; US; State; Scenic Proposed; Former
- Forest Highways

The Catalina Highway, officially the General Hitchcock Highway, is the popular name for a Forest Highway and scenic route located in Pima County in southern Arizona. Also known as the Sky Island Scenic Byway, the Mount Lemmon Highway and Arizona Forest Highway 39, the Catalina Highway is the only paved roadway providing access to the resort village of Summerhaven as well as various recreational and scientific facilities located near the summit of Mount Lemmon. Ascending from the desert floor in Tucson to near the summit of Mount Lemmon, the short highway gains over 6,000 ft (1,800 m), showcasing a variety of climates ranging from lowland desert to alpine forests. The name sky island comes from the analogy of these mountains being like islands of forest in a sea of desert. It is designated as a scenic byway by the National Scenic Byways Program. and an Arizona Scenic Road by the Federal Highway Administration.

== Route description ==
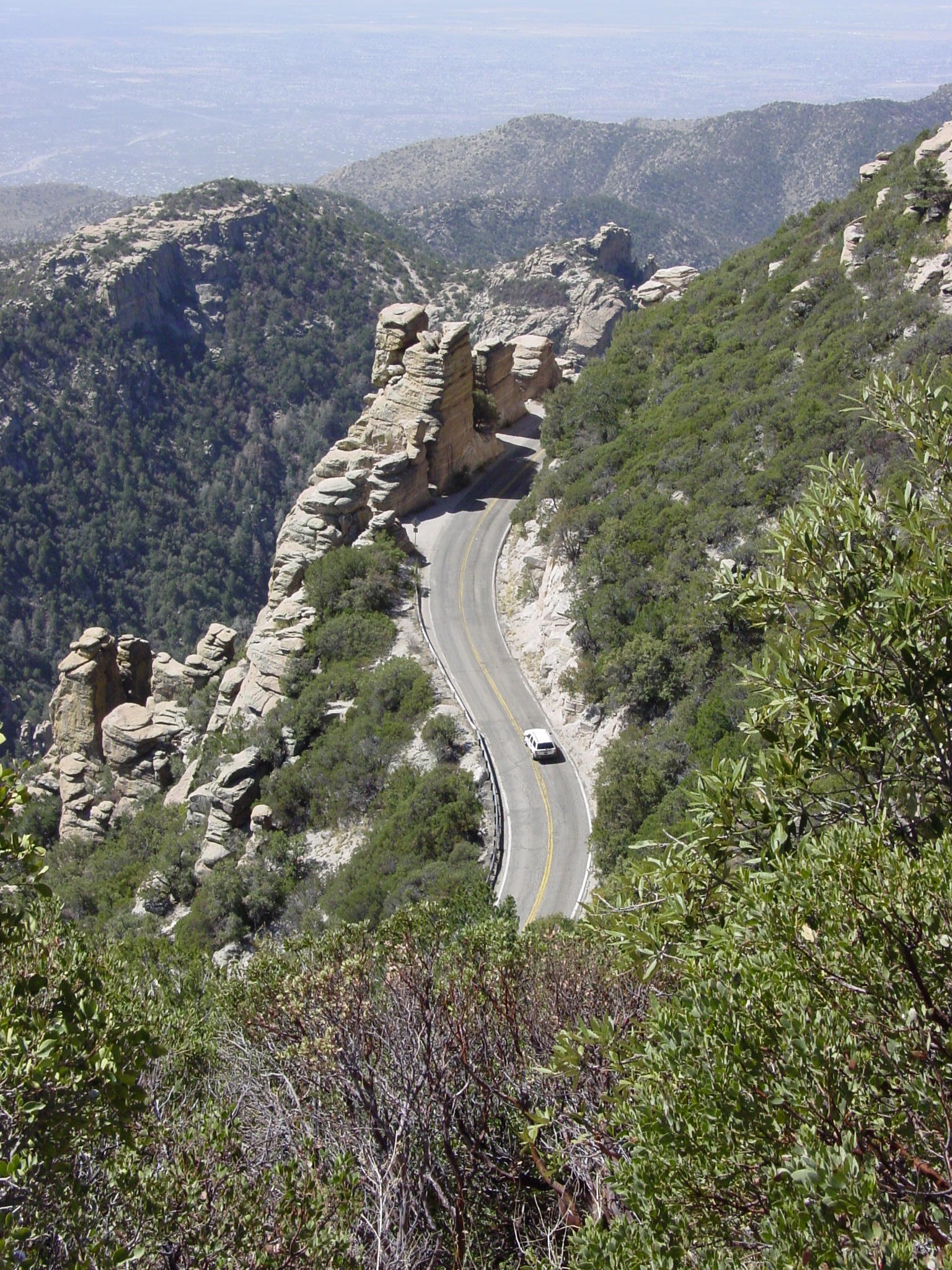
The Catalina Highway traverses the rugged terrain of the Santa Catalina Mountains.

The Catalina Highway begins at its intersection with Tanque Verde Road in northeast Tucson, traversing the unincorporated community of Tanque Verde before crossing into the Coronado National Forest. At this point, the roadway officially becomes the General Hitchcock Highway (Arizona Forest Highway 39), although many maps reflect the common usage of "Catalina Highway" to refer to the entire roadway.

From the boundary with the National Forest, the highway takes a winding route through the Santa Catalina Mountains by way of Molino Canyon. Due to the rapid gain in elevation there are numerous switchbacks, but the road follows a generally northward direction, passing Willow Canyon, until reaching Forest Road 9 and Rose Canyon Lake, after which it begins traveling in a generally northwestern direction, passing Whitetail and Soldier Camp, to the village of Summerhaven.

The final segment of the road, sometimes signed as Ski Run Road, heads east to the Mount Lemmon Ski Valley and ultimately approaches its final terminus near the summit of Mount Lemmon.

== History ==
Gordon Hirabayashi, seen here in 1986, was one of many Japanese-Americans forced to work on the highway's construction.

Construction on the Catalina Highway began in 1933, owing in large part to the efforts of Frank Harris Hitchcock, publisher of the Tucson Citizen and former Postmaster General of the United States. In order to create a route to the popular destinations at the summit of Mount Lemmon, Hitchcock spearheaded the effort to bring together the funds and resources to construct an improved road to Summerhaven and nearby facilities. As a part of the effort, a federal prison camp was established at the foot of the mountains specifically to supply labor for the construction of the highway. During World War II, the camp was converted into an internment camp named the Catalina Honor Camp, and the internees were forced to work on construction of the roadway. One of the Japanese American prisoners at the camp, Gordon Hirabayashi, was later honored in 1999 when the site of the Honor Camp was converted into the Gordon Hirabayashi Recreation Area.

The highway would not be completed until 1950, 17 years after it began. Upon its completion, the highway was named after Hitchcock, who had died in 1935.

The original paved road was narrow, in places had little or no shoulder, featured vertical drop-offs near the road, and was bumpy along most of its length due to years of patchwork repairs. It was long regarded as "one of the most dangerous roads in Pima County." In 1988, the Federal Lands Highway program began a series of seven projects aimed at significantly improving the roadway, with the assistance of the US Forest Service and Pima County. The projects were aimed at improving the quality of the roadway and increasing safety for travelers, while minimizing the impact on the visual aspects and natural beauty of the surrounding mountains. The final project was completed in 2007, at a cost of $15 million, and the road is now much wider and features adequate shoulders, passing areas, and extensive guard rails.

The roadway was awarded with the Arizona Engineering Excellence Grand Award for Context Sensitive Design in 2005 for minimizing damage to existing terrain and pinnacles and careful preservation of the delicate environment.

== Tourism ==
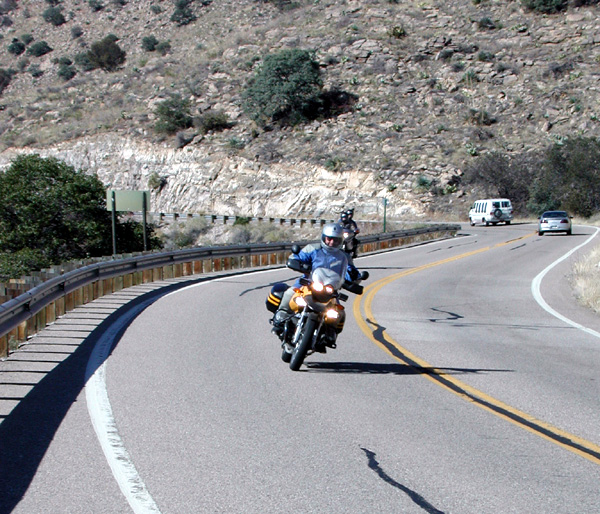
The Catalina Highway is a common destination for motorcyclists.

The Catalina Highway provides the only paved access to attractions on Mount Lemmon and the Santa Catalina Mountains, and has become a popular destination for tourism in the region. According to the Federal Highway Administration, the Catalina Highway is traveled over by more than one million visitors every year. Among the many recreational opportunities in the Coronado National Forest, through which the highway travels, are numerous campgrounds and picnic sites, multi-use trails, and scenic views. The Mount Lemmon Ski Valley, located at the summit of the highway, operates a ski slope during the winter months and remains open during the summer, offering summer "sky rides" on the ski lift. It is billed as the southernmost ski resort in the continental United States.

In addition to the numerous recreational activities the highway offers access to, the highway's status as a Scenic Drive is a draw in and of itself. The Forest Service describes the drive as a biological and ecological tour from Mexico to Canada in only 27 miles. Over the length of the drive, visitors will encounter saguaro cacti, mesquite trees, and cholla plants of the Sonoran Desert, pass through stands of oak, juniper, and pinyon pine, enter pine forests and then finally stands of fir and aspen on the cooler, north-facing slopes at the end of the highway.

The scenic vistas afforded along the highway, along with the terrain, make it a common destination for leisure travel and motorcycling. The route is also popular with bicycling enthusiasts, providing a significant challenge of skill. Local cycling organizations regularly organize rides consisting of 200 or more riders along the highway to the summit of the mountain.

October 2010 saw the inaugural running of the Mount Lemmon Marathon which saw nearly 800 participants finish the race from near the start of the highway up to Summerhaven.

== Major intersections ==
The entire route is in Pima County.

Location	mi	km	Destinations	Notes
Tucson	0.0	0.0	Tanque Verde Road	Southern terminus
Tucson			Harrison Road	
Tucson			Prince Road	
Tucson			Houghton Road	
Tucson			Snyder Road	
	27.0	43.5	Dead end near Mt. Lemmon	Northern terminus
1.000 mi = 1.609 km; 1.000 km = 0.621 mi
