= Summerhaven, Arizona =

CDP in Pima County, Arizona

- Census-designated place
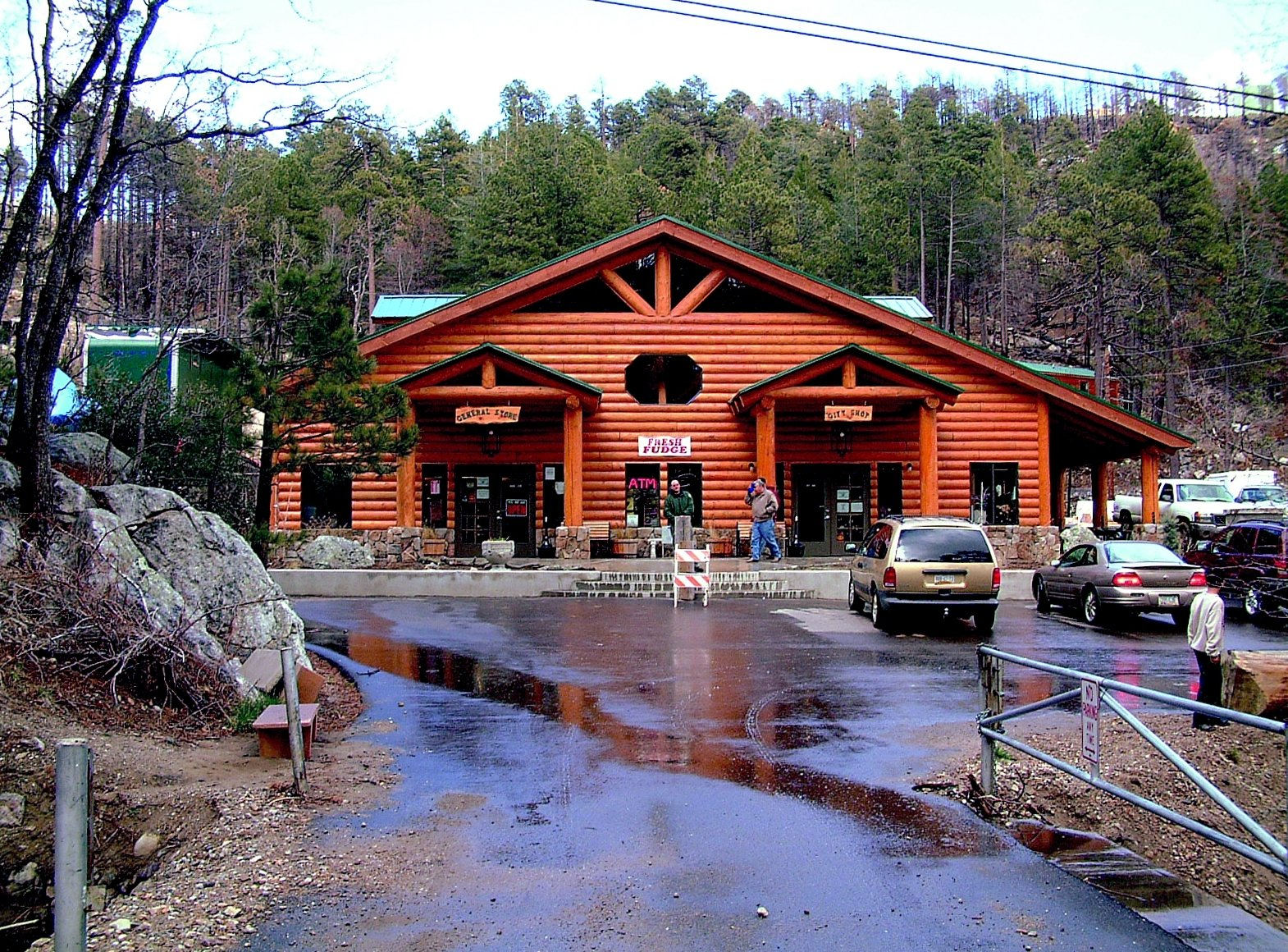
- The Summerhaven general store

- Location of Summerhaven in Pima County and the state of Arizona

- Location in the United States Summerhaven (the United States)
- Coordinates: 32°26′18″N 110°45′33″W
- Country: United States
- State: Arizona
- County: Pima

Area
  - Total: 4.61 sq mi (11.93 km^{2})
  - Land: 4.61 sq mi (11.93 km^{2})
  - Water: 0 sq mi (0.00 km^{2})
- Elevation: 7,764 ft (2,366 m)

Population (2020)
  - Total: 71
  - Density: 15.4/sq mi (5.95/km^{2})
- Time zone: UTC-7 (MST)
- ZIP Code: 85619
- Area code: 520
- GNIS feature ID: 34939
- FIPS code: 04-70175

Summerhaven is a small unincorporated community and census-designated place (CDP) on Mount Lemmon in the Santa Catalina Mountains north of Tucson in Pima County, Arizona, United States. As of the 2010 census it had a permanent population of 40. Summerhaven sits at an elevation of approximately 7,600 to 8,200 feet (2,300 to 2,500 m) above sea level. Summerhaven is accessed via the Catalina Highway from suburban northeast Tucson, and it is about 24.5 miles (39.4 km) from the base of the mountains to Summerhaven.

== History ==
Americans originally used the area of Summerhaven when the U.S. Army at Fort Lowell in Tucson put a military camp there in its defense against the Apache in the 1870s and 1880s. As to white settlement of the vicinity, the Ransier School in Carter Canyon, run by Lydia Ransier and 'Auntie' Broadbent, had two cabins, the larger log one being built in 1912, "one of the oldest cabins on the mountain."

According to historian David Leighton, Summerhaven at one point had the highest golf links in the world. He wrote, "F.E.A Kimball (namesake of Mount Kimball), head of the Summerhaven Land and Improvement Co. on Mount Lemmon, constructed a six-hole golf links. The course was on 50 acres, a mix of Forest Service and private land, with two trout streams running through the acreage. The links were about 7,800 feet above sea level, making it the highest golf course in the world...."

The Aspen wildfire struck Summerhaven in the summer of 2003, which resulted in the destruction of more than 250 of the 700 homes in the community. Arizona Governor Janet Napolitano assessed the damage, and both federal and county officials surveyed the extensive loss. In the months that followed, Tucson residents organized "Lemmon Aid" to help rebuild Summerhaven.

== Geography ==
Summerhaven is located in the Santa Catalina Mountains and is surrounded by pine trees. According to the U.S. Census Bureau, the Summerhaven CDP has a total area of 4.6 sq mi (11.8 km^{2}), almost all land.

=== Climate ===
Due to its high elevation of 8,200 feet (2,500 m), Summerhaven experiences moderately warm summers and cool snowy winters. Yearly snowfall averages can be significant, on average reaching 65 inches (1,700 mm) a year. A windstorm hit Summerhaven in May 2010 and caused extensive damage to the forest around it. Some trails were severely damaged, although repair efforts were underway. The climate could be classified as a subtropical highland climate (Cfb).

Climate data for Mount Lemmon, Arizona (1958–2009)
Month	Jan	Feb	Mar	Apr	May	Jun	Jul	Aug	Sep	Oct	Nov	Dec	Year
Record high °F (°C)	65 (18)	65 (18)	68 (20)	74 (23)	82 (28)	91 (33)	89 (32)	82 (28)	81 (27)	76 (24)	71 (22)	65 (18)	91 (33)
Mean daily maximum °F (°C)	49.2 (9.6)	48.3 (9.1)	52.9 (11.6)	60.8 (16.0)	69.1 (20.6)	76.4 (24.7)	76.5 (24.7)	73.6 (23.1)	70.4 (21.3)	61.7 (16.5)	56.3 (13.5)	50.6 (10.3)	62.2 (16.8)
Mean daily minimum °F (°C)	22.8 (−5.1)	21.8 (−5.7)	25.7 (−3.5)	31.7 (−0.2)	36.6 (2.6)	44.4 (6.9)	49.8 (9.9)	49.8 (9.9)	45.1 (7.3)	36.4 (2.4)	29.7 (−1.3)	24.3 (−4.3)	34.8 (1.6)
Record low °F (°C)	−4 (−20)	−7 (−22)	−1 (−18)	19 (−7)	27 (−3)	32 (0)	39 (4)	42 (6)	31 (−1)	20 (−7)	4 (−16)	4 (−16)	−7 (−22)
Average precipitation inches (mm)	3.15 (80)	1.69 (43)	1.17 (30)	0.50 (13)	0.25 (6.4)	0.62 (16)	4.41 (112)	6.99 (178)	3.39 (86)	3.05 (77)	1.75 (44)	2.60 (66)	29.56 (751)
Average snowfall inches (cm)	16.5 (42)	20.4 (52)	6.8 (17)	2.0 (5.1)	0 (0)	0 (0)	0 (0)	0 (0)	0 (0)	2.0 (5.1)	6.2 (16)	11.0 (28)	64.9 (165)
Average precipitation days	5	5	5	3	2	2	10	11	5	3	3	5	59
Mean monthly sunshine hours	241	243	299	325	374	372	327	319	315	301	260	242	3,618
Source 1:
Source 2:

== Demographics ==
Historical population
Census	Pop.	Note	%±
2020	71		—
U.S. Decennial Census

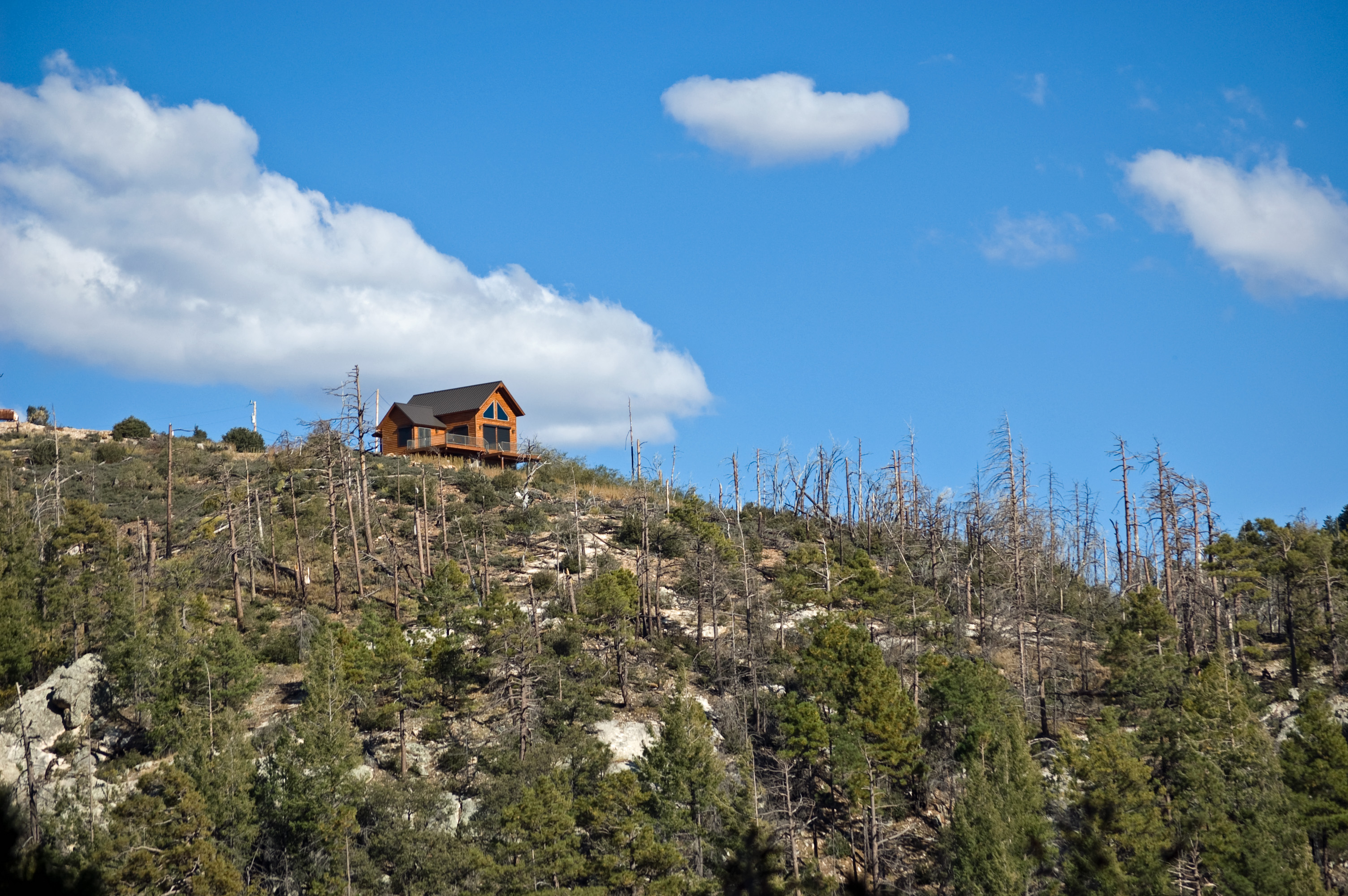
House in Summerhaven

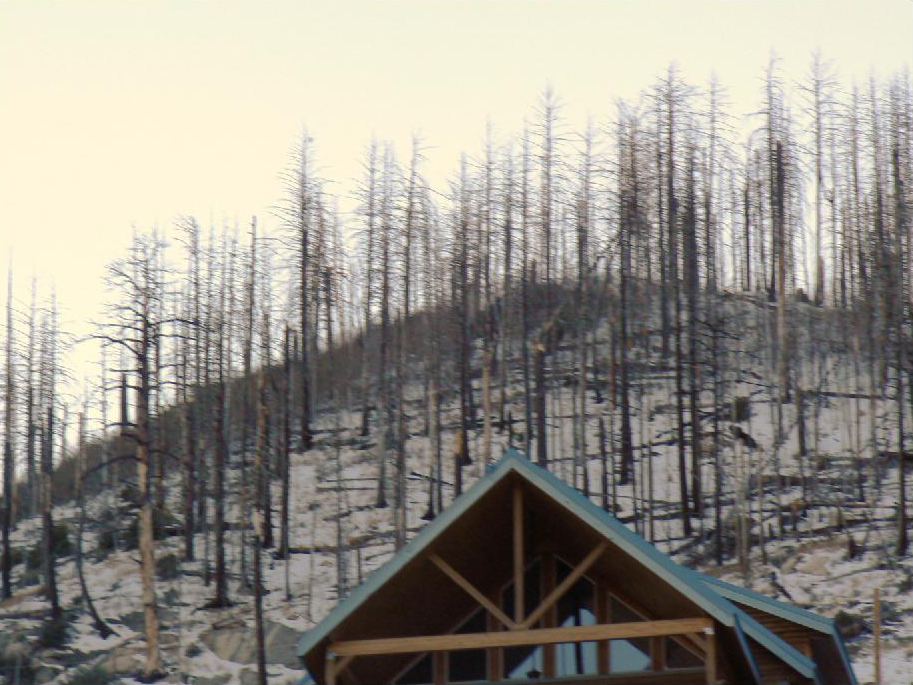
Burnt pine trees, snow, and a cabin among the stark landscape after the Aspen fire in 2003

In 2010, the population of the Summerhaven census-designated place was 40. Note that this includes only people who were living in Summerhaven on the day of the census, thus excluding many part-time or seasonal residents. As of the 2010 census, the racial composition of Summerhaven was:

- White: 75% (Non-Hispanic Whites: 70%)
- Black or African American: 0%
- Native American: 15%
- Asian: 10%
- Native Hawaiian and Other Pacific Islander: 0%
- Some other race: 0%
- Two or more races: 0%

== Arts and culture ==
Summerhaven is a popular tourist destination. Several small shops in Summerhaven attract visitors. In the winter, residents from lower elevations travel to Summerhaven, when the Catalina Highway is open, to enjoy the snow. Also during the summer, the same residents will frequent the area to get away from the heat. Because of the elevation difference between the Tucson area (5,000–6,000 feet), the temperature in Summerhaven will be anywhere from 15–30 degrees F cooler depending on weather patterns, which usually makes it a very comfortable place to be compared to the hot desert heat in the summer time.

October 2010 saw the inaugural running of the Mount Lemmon Marathon, in which nearly 800 participants finished the race from near the start of the Catalina Highway up to Summerhaven.

== Parks and recreation ==
The Mount Lemmon Ski Valley located outside Summerhaven is the southernmost ski location in the continental United States.

== Education ==
Summerhaven is not located in a school district; the closest district is Tanque Verde Unified School District.

The Pima County School Superintendent arranges for education of K-12 students living in areas without school districts. No transportation from that office is provided from Tanque Verde USD to Summerhaven.

== Infrastructure ==
There is a general store and several food venues, but no gasoline or automotive services. The Mount Lemmon Fire Department maintains a station near Summerhaven, providing fire and EMS services.
