= Mount Lemmon Marathon =

Road race marathons in Arizona, US

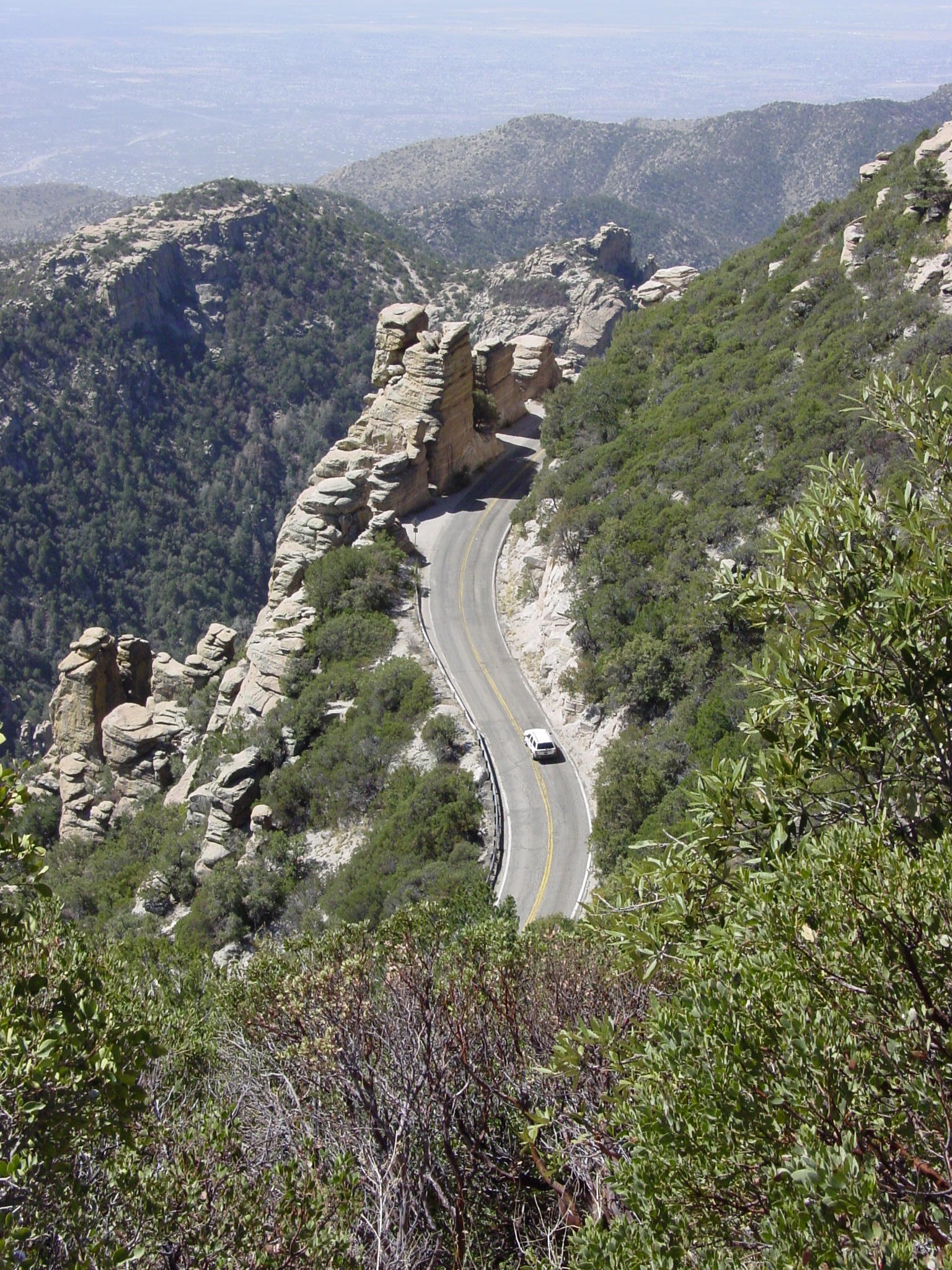
- A section of the General Hitchcock Scenic Byway which served as the course for both races
- Date: 2010-2013 (uphill); 2017-2019 (downhill)
- Location: Tucson, Arizona, United States
- Event type: Road
- Distance: Marathon and half-marathon
- Course records: uphill marathon: • Men: 3:05:07 (2011) • Women: 3:20:19 (2013) downhill marathon: • Men: 2:33:43 (2018) • Women: 2:49:08 (2017)

The Mount Lemmon Marathon were a pair of separate road race marathon events that took place in the Santa Catalina Mountains near the city of Tucson, Arizona. The initial race, which was in the uphill direction, was held between 2010 and 2013. The uphill race started near the desert floor and ended at the village of Summerhaven near the top of Mount Lemmon.

Between 2017 and 2019, the second iteration of the race ran in the downhill direction from Summerhaven down to the desert floor. With an elevation gain/loss of approximately 6,000 feet (1,800 m), it was regarded as one of the steepest marathon race courses in the world.

Local television station KVOA described the uphill race as "the only long-distance uphill race in the U.S". It had been described as the most difficult road marathon in the world. Runners ran on the General Hitchcock Scenic Byway and started the race surrounded by cacti near the floor of the Sonoran Desert, and as they climbed the mountain, runners transitioned into lush pine forests near the top of the mountain at over 8,000 feet (2,400 m) above sea level. The New York Times noted that there are other difficult marathons including the Antarctic Ice Marathon which is run on snow and ice south of the Antarctic Circle, the Everest Marathon which starts at the south Everest Base Camp at an altitude of 17,590 feet (5,360 m), and the Pikes Peak Marathon which climbs over 7,700 feet (2,300 m) to the top of Pikes Peak.

Some of the runners cited the challenge of running continuously uphill for 26.2 miles (42.2 km) as a reason for running the Mount Lemmon Marathon.]

The downhill marathon and half-marathon on Mount Lemmon was initiated by the Revel Racing Series in November, 2017. The race attracted a moderate number of participants during its three years of operation. In 2017, there were 276 finishers in the full marathon and 429 finishers in the half marathon. In 2018, there were 461 finishers in the full marathon and 719 finishers in the half marathon. In 2019, there were 421 finishers in the full marathon and 700 finishers in the half marathon.

The Revel Racing Series elected to retire the Mount Lemmon downhill races after the 2019 event. It is not scheduled again.
