= Soldier Camp, Arizona =

- Populated place
- Location within the state of Arizona Soldier Camp (the United States)
- Coordinates: 32°25′37″N 110°44′28″W
- Country: United States
- State: Arizona
- County: Pima
- Elevation: 7,710 ft (2,350 m)
- Time zone: UTC-7 (Mountain (MST))
  - Summer (DST): UTC-7 (MST)
- Area code: 520
- FIPS code: 04-67940
- GNIS feature ID: 34614

Soldier Camp is a populated place situated in Pima County, Arizona, United States. It is located along the Catalina Highway in the Coronado National Forest. It has an estimated elevation of 7,720 feet (2,350 m) above sea level. Soldier Camp is a community of USFS Recreation Residences.
