= Harold Evans (attorney) =

American Quaker lawyer

Harold Evans (October 26, 1886 – April 27, 1977), a Philadelphia attorney, was appointed by the United Nations to be the first Special Municipal Commissioner for Jerusalem on May 13, 1948. Evans arrived in Cairo, Egypt on May 23, 1948, but due to his Quaker religious principles he would not travel with a British military escort from Cairo to Jerusalem. He eventually arrived in Jerusalem in early June, but abruptly resigned his position afterward.

Evans was born in 1886 in Germantown, Philadelphia, Pennsylvania to Jonathan and Rachel Reeve (Cope) Evans. He married Sylvia Hathaway (d. 1968) on May 1, 1914; the couple had six children. A graduate of Haverford College (1907) and of the University of Pennsylvania Law School (1910), Evans was long associated with the American Friends Service Committee.

Evans was co-counsel before the Supreme Court of the United States in 1943 on behalf of Gordon Hirabayashi, in Hirabayashi v. United States, one of the test cases challenging the curfew and internment laws imposed on Japanese residents of the U.S. and Japanese-Americans in the Western states during World War II. The Supreme Court ruled against Evans's arguments, in a decision which is now considered one of the Court's most disreputable.

Evans received honorary doctorates from Wilmington and Haverford Colleges in 1964 and 1968, respectively. He was active in Friends education, and a long-time member (1943-1967, thereafter emeritus) of Haverford's Board of Managers.
