= Mount Lemmon Ski Valley =

Recreational ski area in Arizona, United States

Mt. Lemmon Ski Valley
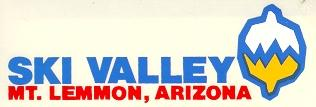

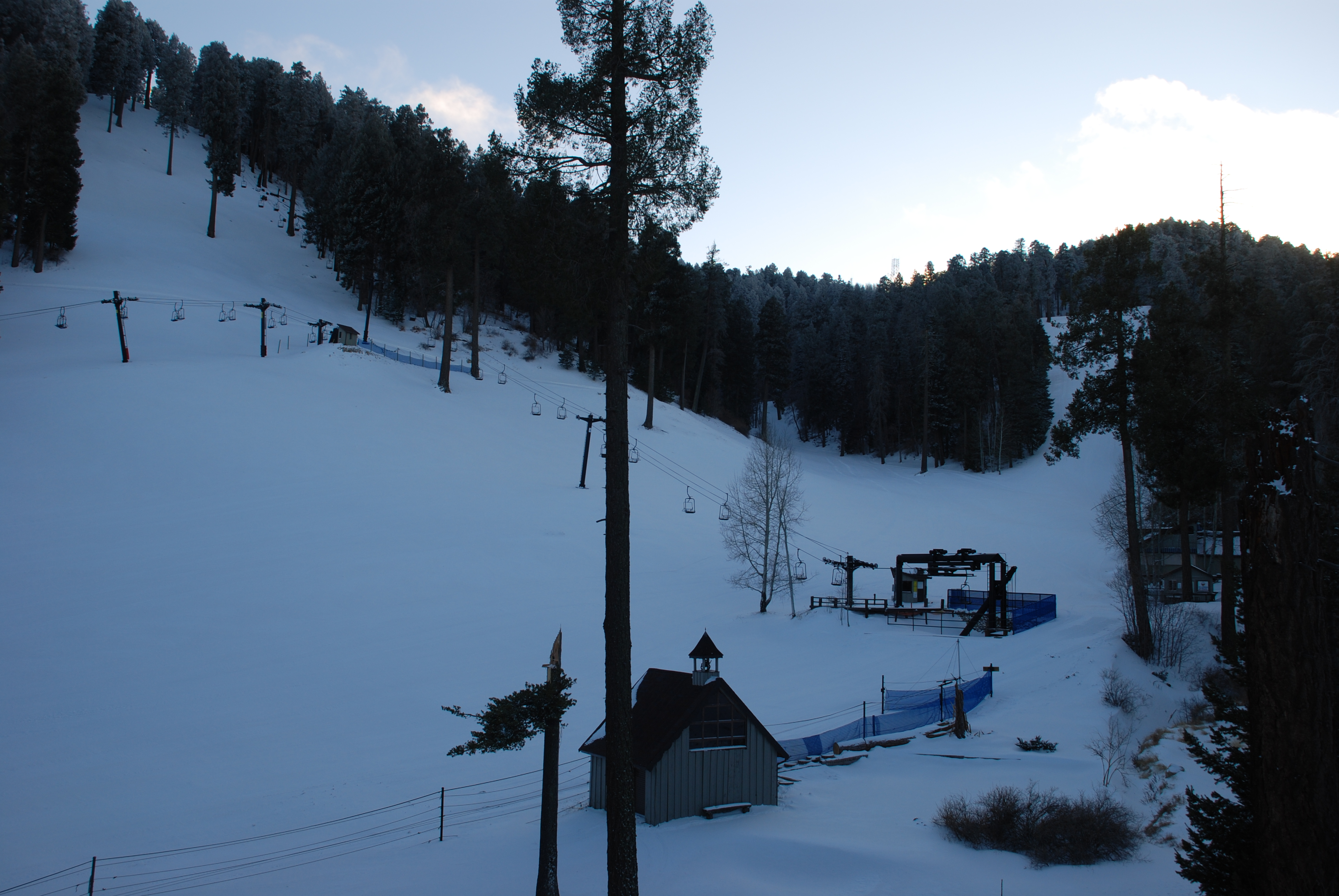
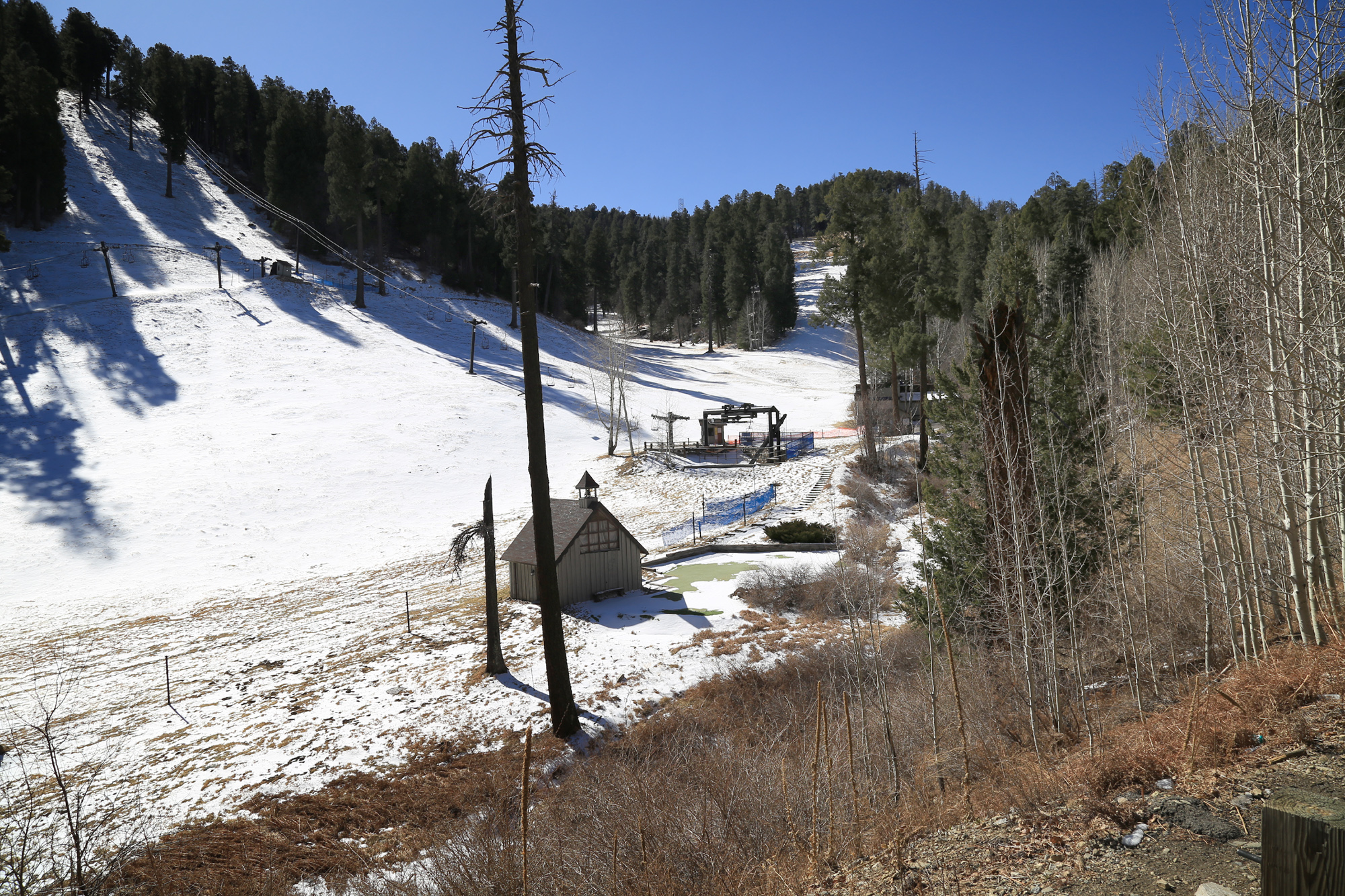
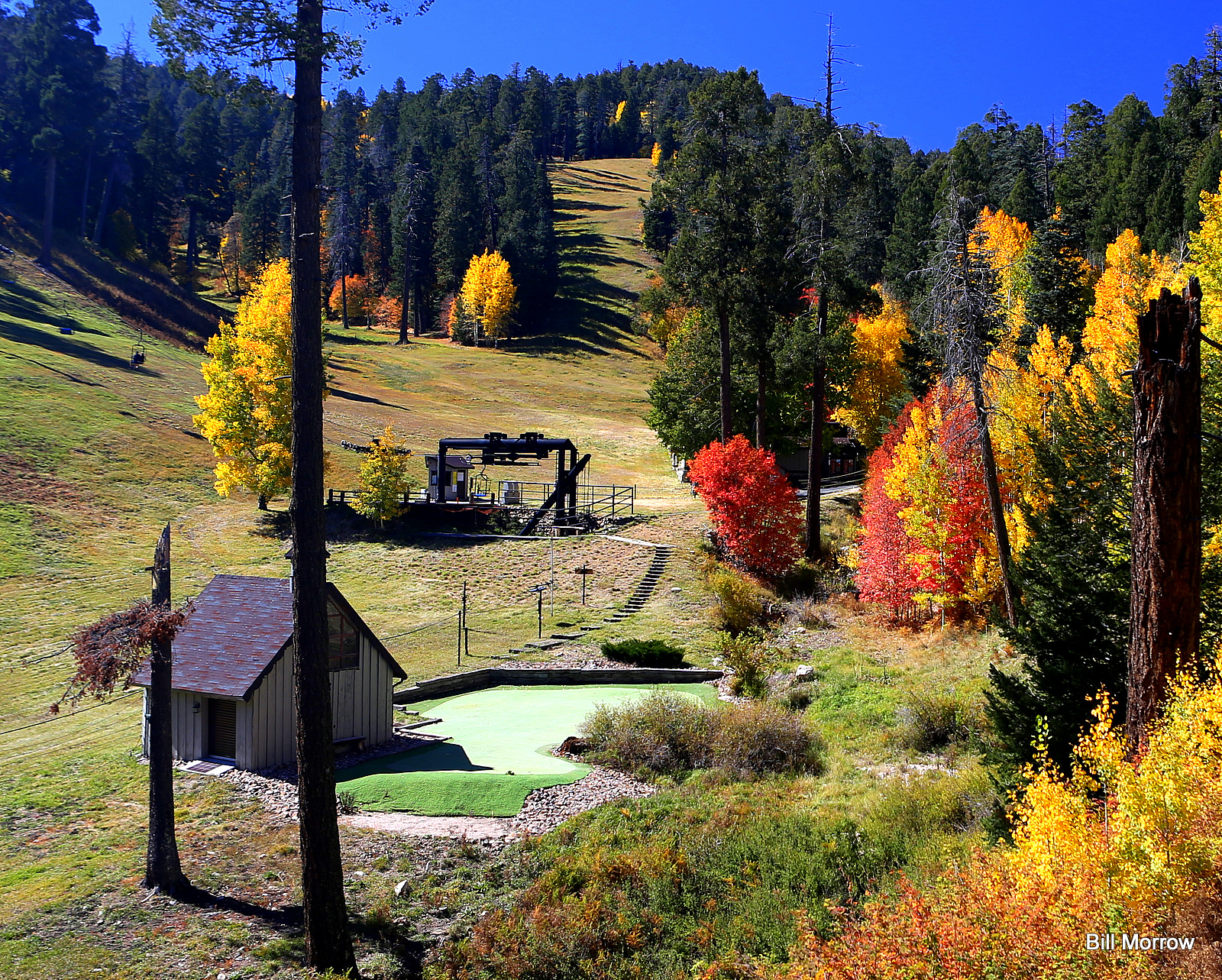
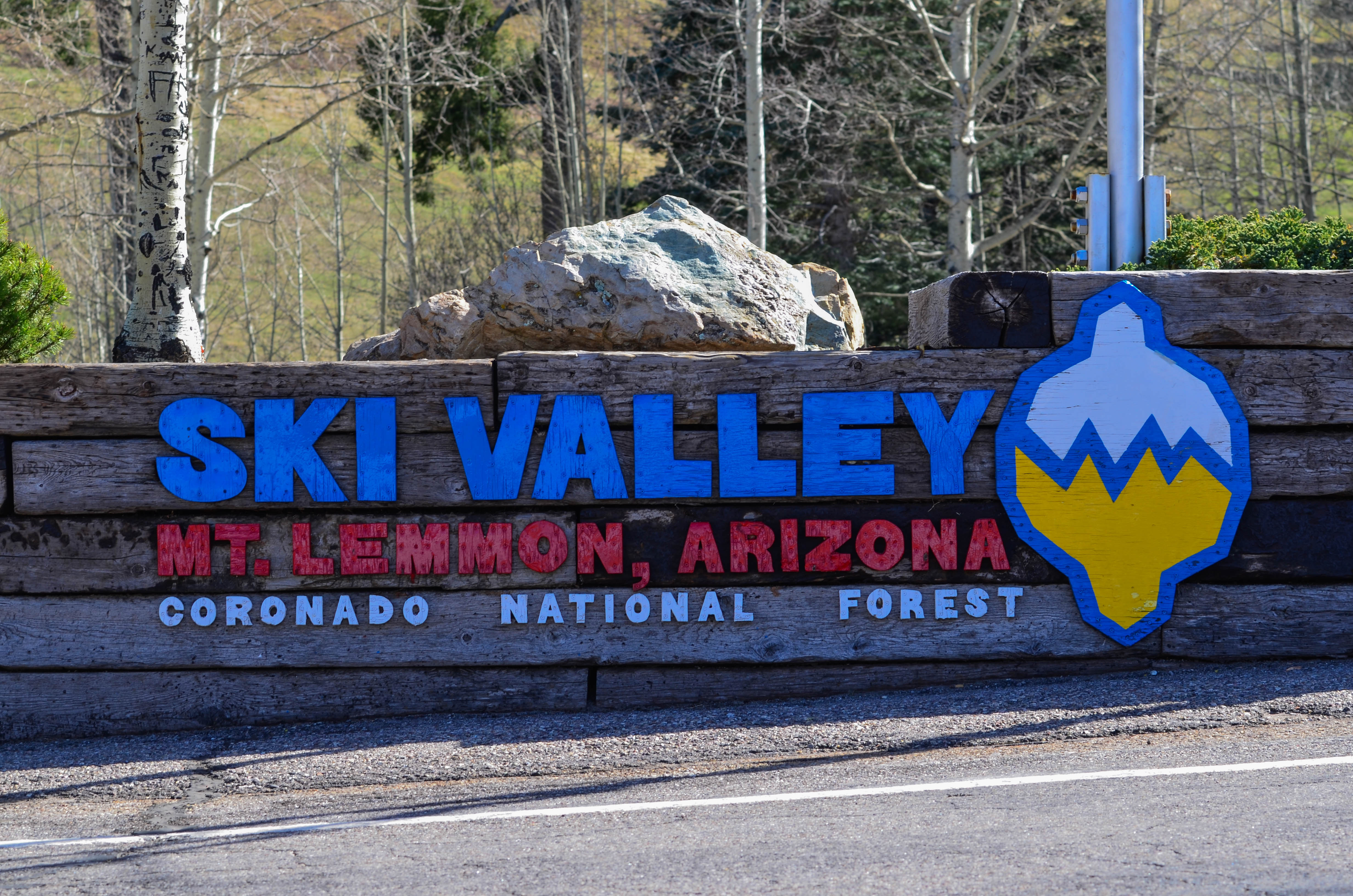

- Location in Arizona Mt. Lemmon Ski Valley (the United States)
- Location: Pima County, Arizona, USA
- Nearest city: Tucson, Arizona
- Coordinates: 32°27′08″N 110°47′02″W
- Top elevation: 9,157 ft (2,791 m)
- Base elevation: 8,200 ft (2,500 m)
- Skiable area: 200 acres (0.81 km^{2})
- Trails: 21; 20% beginner 38% intermediate 42% advanced/expert
- Longest run: 8,500 ft (2,600 m)
- Lift system: 3 (2 double chairlifts, 1 chair)
- Snowfall: 180 in/year (457.2 cm/year)
- Snowmaking: No
- Night skiing: No
- Website: www.skithelemmon.com

Mount Lemmon Ski Valley is a recreational ski area in the U.S. state of Arizona, and the southernmost ski destination in the continental United States. Mount Lemmon Ski Valley is located on the slopes of Mount Lemmon in the Santa Catalina Mountains just north of Tucson, Arizona. It is part of the Coronado National Forest, located near the mountaintop village of Summerhaven. The summit is 9,157 feet (2,791 m) above sea level, and receives approximately 180 inches (4.6 m) of snow annually.

Winter storms on Mount Lemmon are frequent, leaving untouched powder areas. The ski season on Mount Lemmon usually occurs between mid-December and April. The weather is usually mild enough to ski in a sweater and denim jeans, with temperatures ranging from 20 to 50 °F (−7 to 10 °C). There is no grooming at Mount Lemmon, which makes even the mild terrain challenging. Ski Valley is accessible via the Catalina Highway. Parking is limited at the ski area. The ski area is regularly closed some weekdays even when it has snow, but the specific days of closure vary. The highway is frequently closed for a day or so following substantial snowfalls until plows can clear the road. On April 12, 1973, Mount Lemmon received record snowfall totaling 26 inches. Restrictions limiting travel to vehicles with chains or four-wheel-drive above certain elevations may also be in effect during these times.

The "back" road to Mount Lemmon from the town of Oracle, Arizona, is dirt and is closed from December through March, and so provides no access during the ski season.

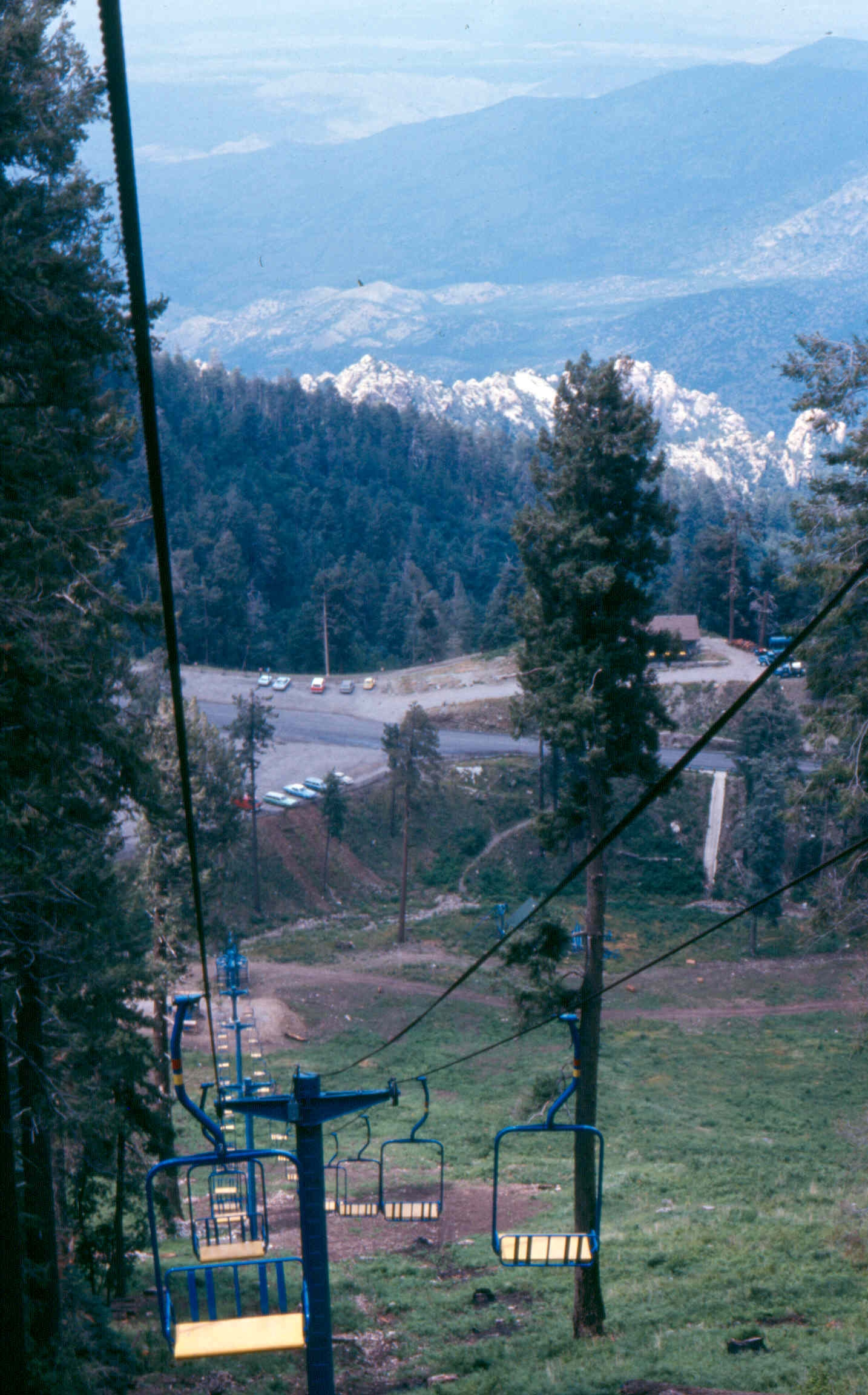
Ski lift during the non-ski season

The ski lift runs year round, as a "Sky Ride" experience in the summertime, offering views of the Ski Valley area, forest and grass-covered slopes, and the long distance vistas of the mountains and valleys in the distance north of the Santa Catalinas.

The Ski Valley is on United States Forest Service land, but is operated as a private concession by permit with the Forest Service.

== Mountain statistics ==
=== Elevation ===
- Base: 8,200 feet (2,500 m)
- Summit: 9,150 feet (2,790 m)
- Vertical drop: 950' (estimated) feet (3rd highest in Arizona)

=== Trails ===
- Skiable area: 200 acres (0.81 km^{2})
- 22 trails
  - novice – 20%
  - intermediate – 38%
  - advanced and expert – 42%
- Longest trail – 8,500 feet (2,600 m)

=== Lifts ===
- 3 total
  - 2 double chairs
  - 1 Surface lifts
- Uphill capacity – 2,000 skiers per hour
- Annual snowfall – around 180 inches (4.6 m)
