= Mount Lemmon =

Mountain in Arizona, United States

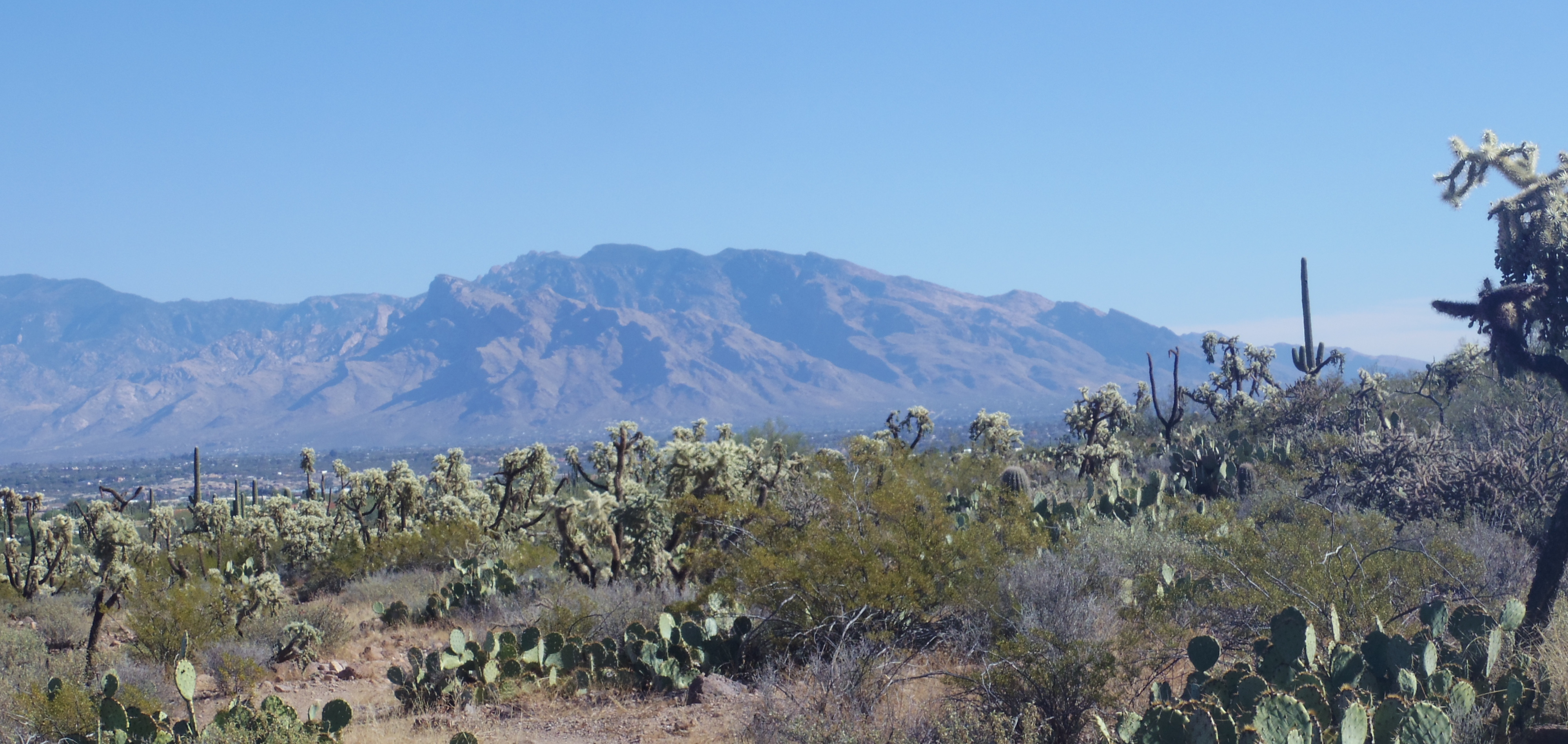
- View of Mount Lemmon from the western side

Highest point
- Elevation: 9,171 ft (2,795 m) NAVD 88
- Prominence: 5,157 ft (1,572 m)
- Listing: Arizona county high point; U.S. most prominent peaks 117th
- Coordinates: 32°26′35″N 110°47′19″W

Geography
- Location within Arizona
- Location: Tucson, Pima County, Arizona, U.S.
- Parent range: Santa Catalina Mountains
- Topo map: USGS Mount Lemmon

Climbing
- Easiest route: Catalina Highway

Mount Lemmon is a 9,171 ft (2,795 m) mountain in the Santa Catalina Mountains of the US state of Arizona, the highest in the range. It is located in the Coronado National Forest north of Tucson, United States. Mount Lemmon was named for botanist Sara Plummer Lemmon, who trekked to the top of the mountain with her husband and E. O. Stratton, a local rancher, by horse and foot in 1881. Mount Lemmon is also known as Babad Do'ag, or Frog Mountain to the Tohono O'odham. It is home to the southernmost ski destination in the continental United States.

== Geology ==
Mount Lemmon is made up of Bolsa Quartzite, Dripping Spring Quartzite, and a local sandstone and conglomerate. The portions have been intruded by a Diabase Dike of the Apace Group.

== Summerhaven ==
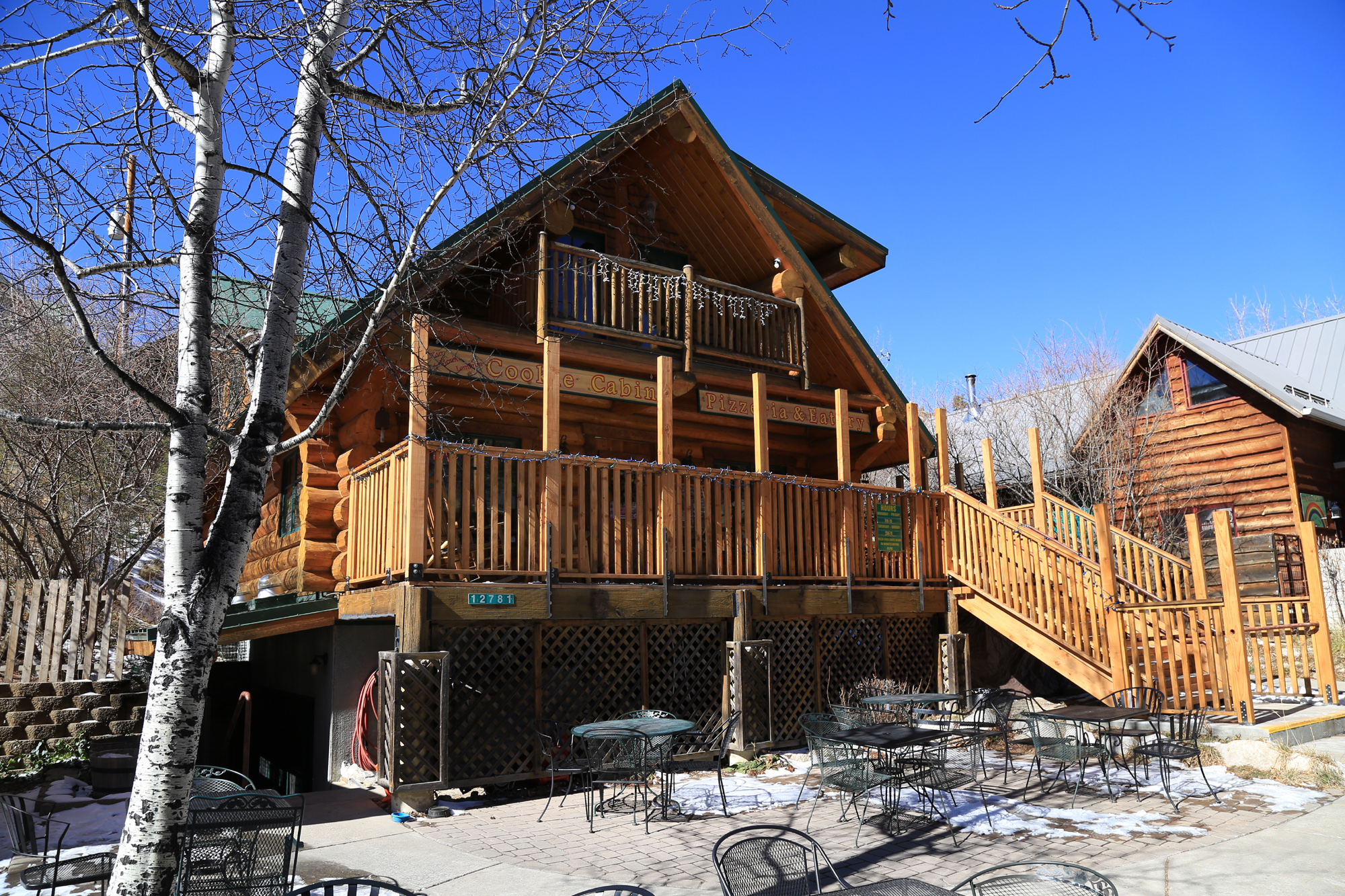
Summerhaven, Cookie Cabin

Summerhaven is a small town near the top of the mountain. It is a summer residence for many, but there are some year-round residents. There are many small cabins, most of which were rebuilt after the Aspen Fire of July 2003.

== Geography ==
=== Climate ===
Due to the elevation change from the bottom to the top, the summit of the mountain can be 20–30 °F cooler than the base. It typically sees from 10 to 20 inches of monthly snowfall during the winter, making it a cool escape and popular tourist attraction for Tucson inhabitants.

Climate data for Summerhaven, Arizona (1958–2009) 7,790 ft (2,370 m)elevation
| Month | Jan | Feb | Mar | Apr | May | Jun | Jul | Aug | Sep | Oct | Nov | Dec | Year |
|---|---|---|---|---|---|---|---|---|---|---|---|---|---|
| Record high °F (°C) | 65 (18) | 65 (18) | 68 (20) | 74 (23) | 82 (28) | 91 (33) | 89 (32) | 82 (28) | 81 (27) | 76 (24) | 71 (22) | 65 (18) | 91 (33) |
| Mean daily maximum °F (°C) | 49.2 (9.6) | 48.3 (9.1) | 52.9 (11.6) | 60.8 (16.0) | 69.1 (20.6) | 76.4 (24.7) | 76.5 (24.7) | 73.6 (23.1) | 70.4 (21.3) | 61.7 (16.5) | 56.3 (13.5) | 50.6 (10.3) | 62.2 (16.8) |
| Mean daily minimum °F (°C) | 22.8 (−5.1) | 21.8 (−5.7) | 25.7 (−3.5) | 31.7 (−0.2) | 36.6 (2.6) | 44.4 (6.9) | 49.8 (9.9) | 49.8 (9.9) | 45.1 (7.3) | 36.4 (2.4) | 29.7 (−1.3) | 24.3 (−4.3) | 34.8 (1.6) |
| Record low °F (°C) | −4 (−20) | −7 (−22) | −1 (−18) | 19 (−7) | 27 (−3) | 32 (0) | 39 (4) | 42 (6) | 31 (−1) | 20 (−7) | 4 (−16) | 4 (−16) | −7 (−22) |
| Average precipitation inches (mm) | 3.15 (80) | 1.69 (43) | 1.17 (30) | 0.50 (13) | 0.25 (6.4) | 0.62 (16) | 4.41 (112) | 6.99 (178) | 3.39 (86) | 3.05 (77) | 1.75 (44) | 2.60 (66) | 29.56 (751) |
| Average snowfall inches (cm) | 16.5 (42) | 20.4 (52) | 6.8 (17) | 2.0 (5.1) | 0 (0) | 0 (0) | 0 (0) | 0 (0) | 0 (0) | 2.0 (5.1) | 6.2 (16) | 11.0 (28) | 64.9 (165) |
| Average precipitation days | 5 | 5 | 5 | 3 | 2 | 2 | 10 | 11 | 5 | 3 | 3 | 5 | 59 |
| Mean monthly sunshine hours | 241 | 243 | 299 | 325 | 374 | 372 | 327 | 319 | 315 | 301 | 260 | 242 | 3,618 |
Source 1:
Source 2:

== Mount Lemmon Station Observatory ==
At the peak is the Mount Lemmon Observatory, which was formerly the site of a USAF radar base of the Air Defense Command, and the building that formerly housed a military emergency radar tracking station for landing the Space Shuttle at White Sands Missile Range. Although the United States military had a presence on the mountain for several decades all their facilities have been abandoned and were given to the United States Forest Service. The area and buildings that make up the Mount Lemmon Station Observatory are leased from the Forest Service by the University of Arizona. The telescopes on the mountain are still used for astronomical research today by organizations such as the Catalina Sky Survey, the Mount Lemmon Sky Center, the University of Arizona Astronomy Camp program, the University of Arizona, and the University of Minnesota. The educational resources at the top of the mountain make it a unique research and teaching destination.

== Catalina Highway ==
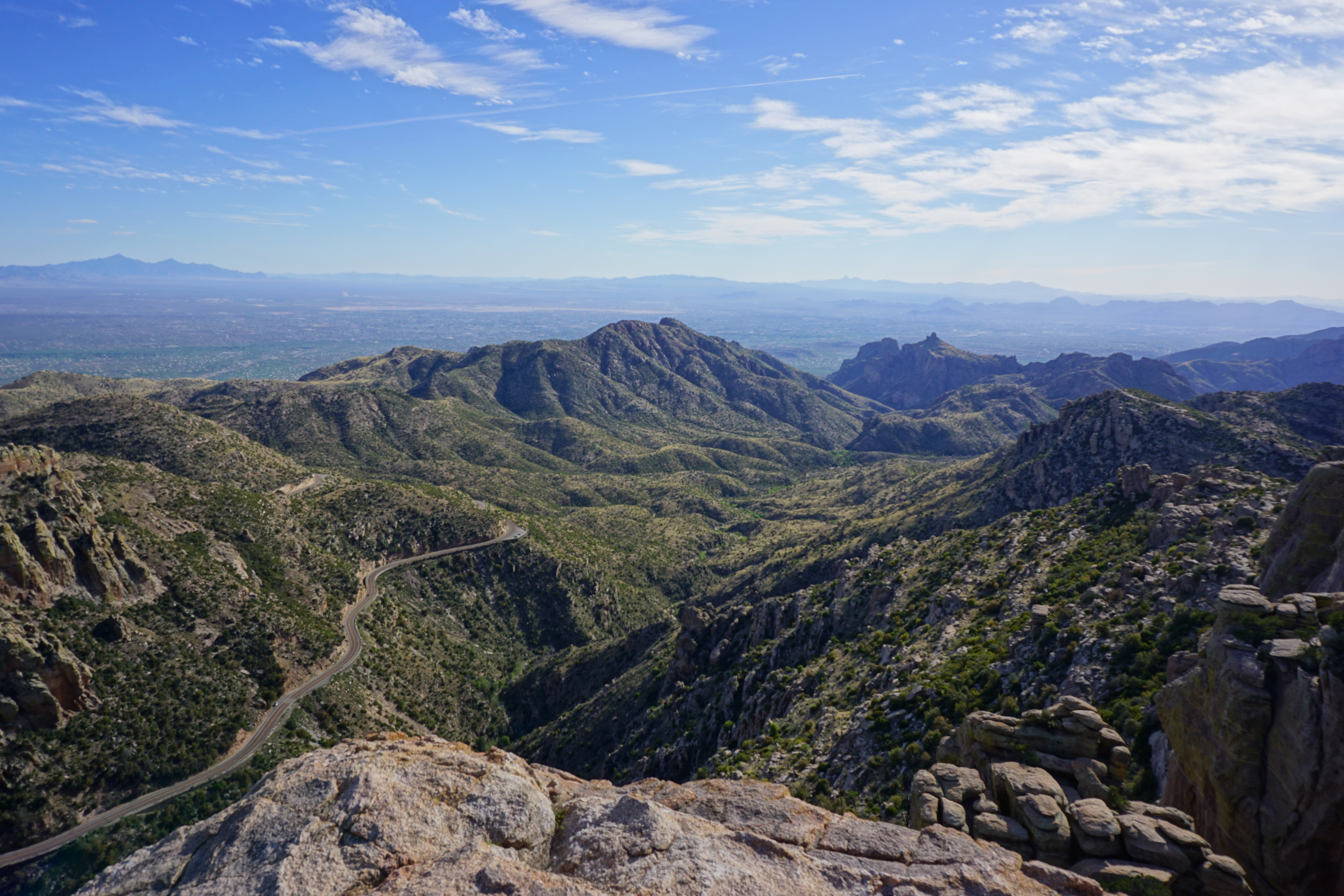
Catalina Highway in the Santa Catalina Mountains

The Catalina Highway, also called the Mount Lemmon Highway, as well as the Hitchcock Highway (after Frank Harris Hitchcock), runs up the Santa Catalina Mountains from the east side of Tucson up to Summerhaven, at the top of Mt. Lemmon. Known for its scenic curves and spectacular mountain views, the road is popular destination for tourists, for locals escaping summer's heat and cyclists, and has been recently designated as the Sky Island Parkway, part of the US National Scenic Byway system.

The year 2010 saw the inaugural running of the Mount Lemmon Marathon.

== Fees and permits ==
Catalina Highway charges tolls for parking, camping, and hiking. However, the tolls are only officially charged for people who are camping. Tolls for other events, such as hiking, parking, or grilling, are a part of the honor system. Park rangers will not check for toll payments unless someone is using the park campgrounds. Anyone wishing to sightsee or travel to Summerhaven are not subjected to paying tolls.

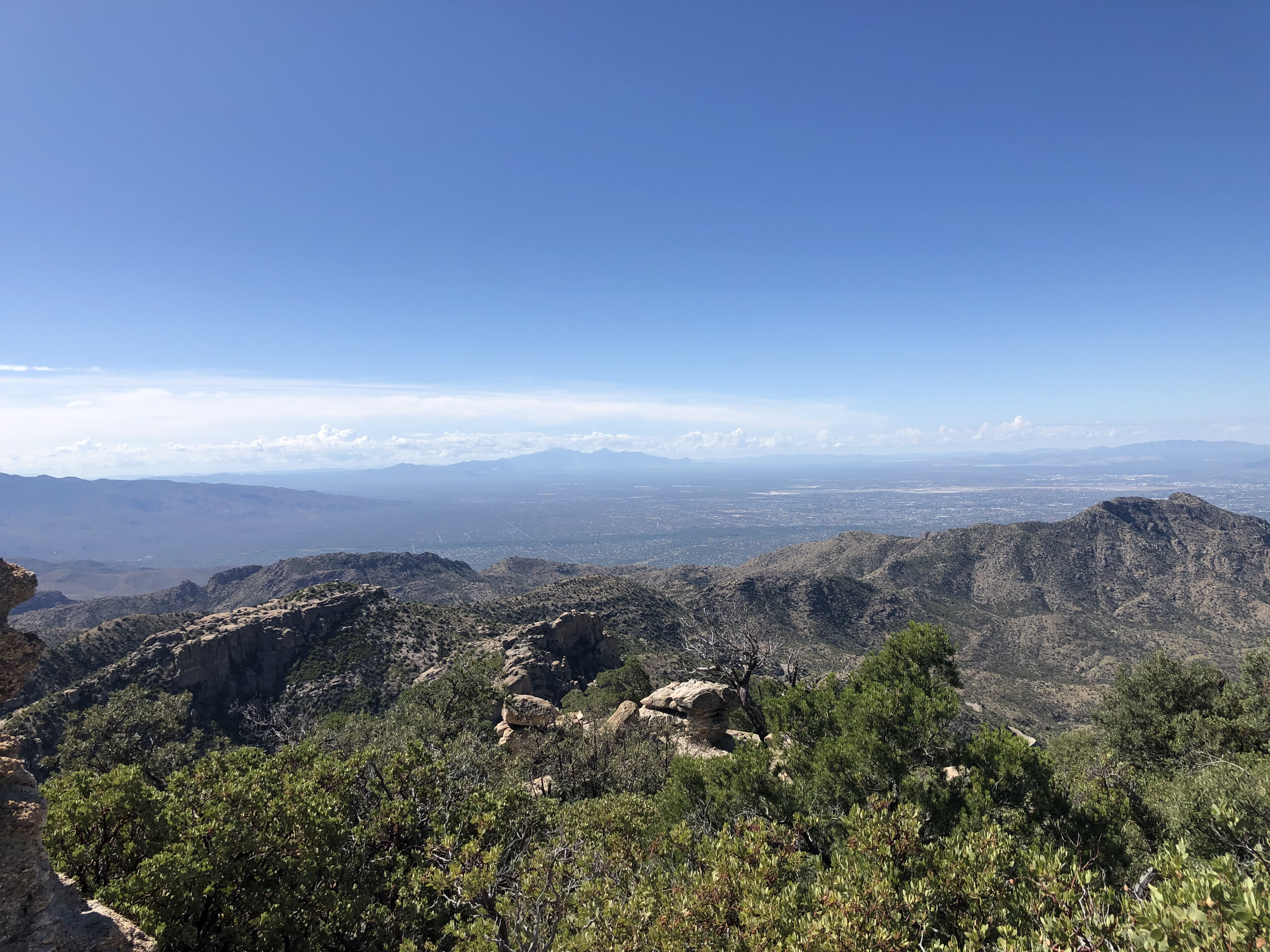
View from Windy Point Visa while ascending Mt. Lemmon

== Back side ==
An unpaved road to the summit on the north side of Mount Lemmon starts in Oracle, which is on Arizona Route 77 north of Tucson. It offers a secondary route to the top. This route is popular with off-road 4x4 drivers and with off-road or dual-purpose motorcyclists. This road ends at the Catalina Highway near Loma Linda. Before the Catalina Highway was built it was the only route up the mountain.

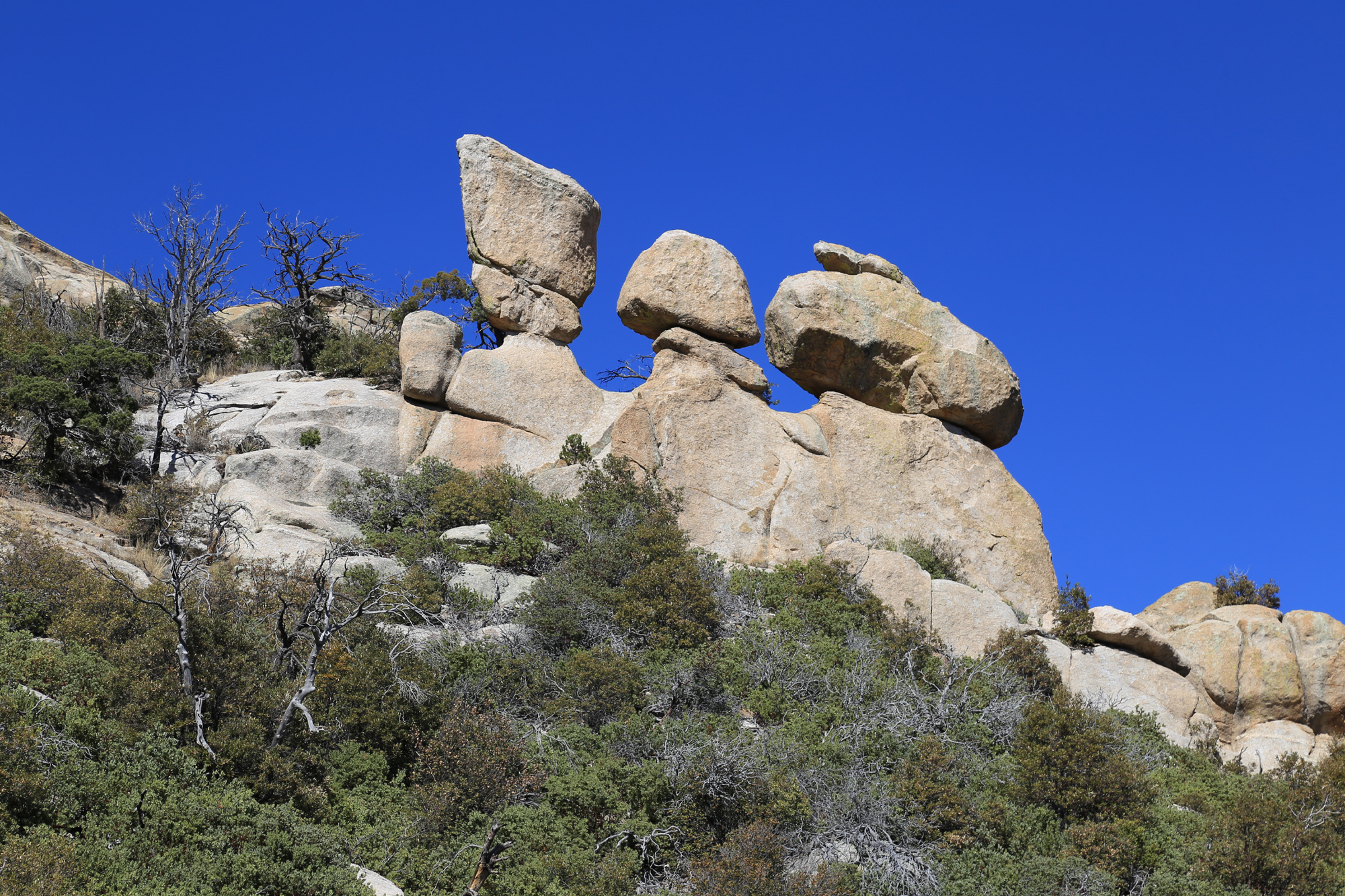
Hoodoos, Santa Catalina Mountains

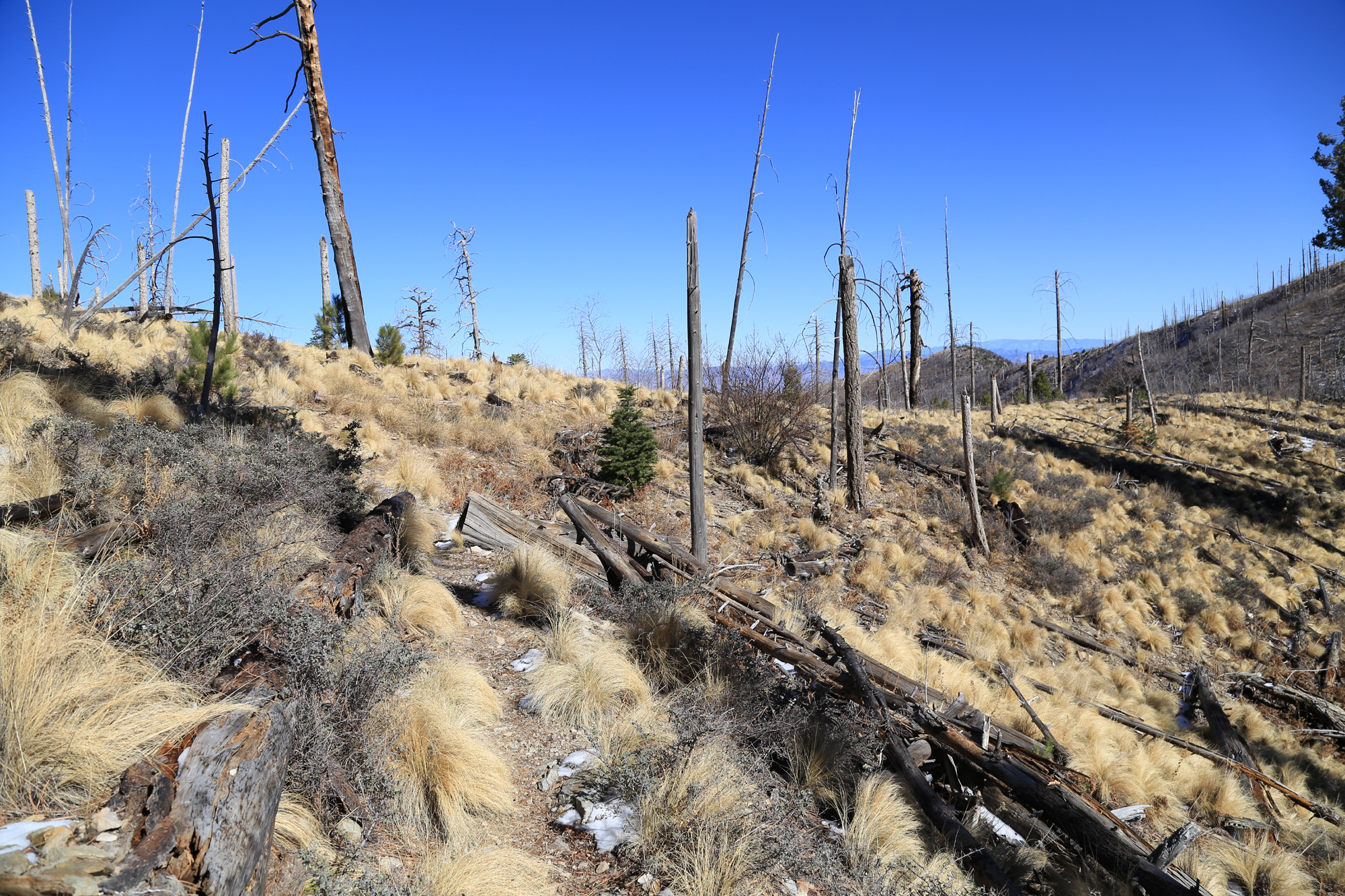
Remnants of the 2003 Aspen Fire

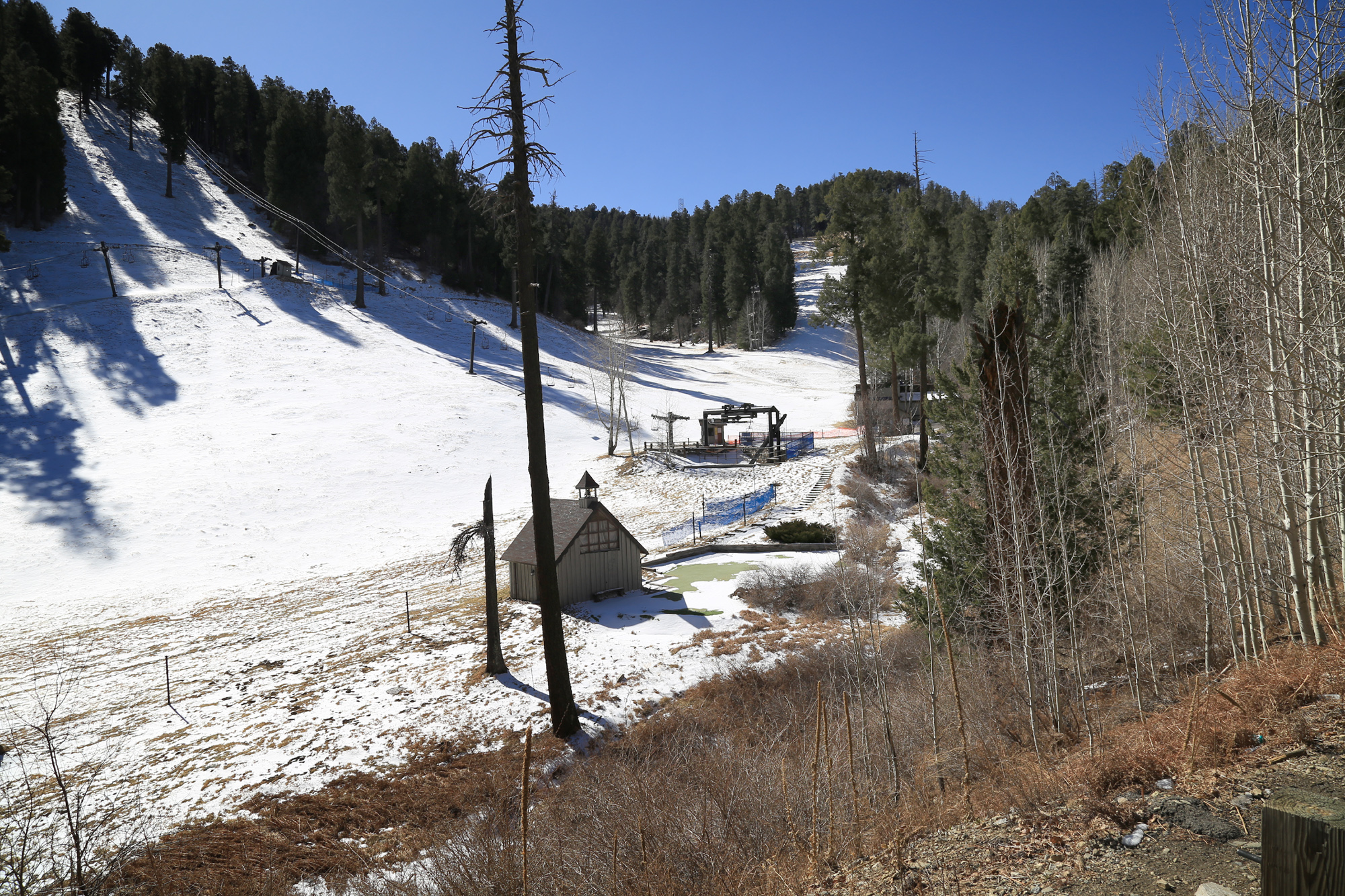
Mount Lemmon Ski Valley

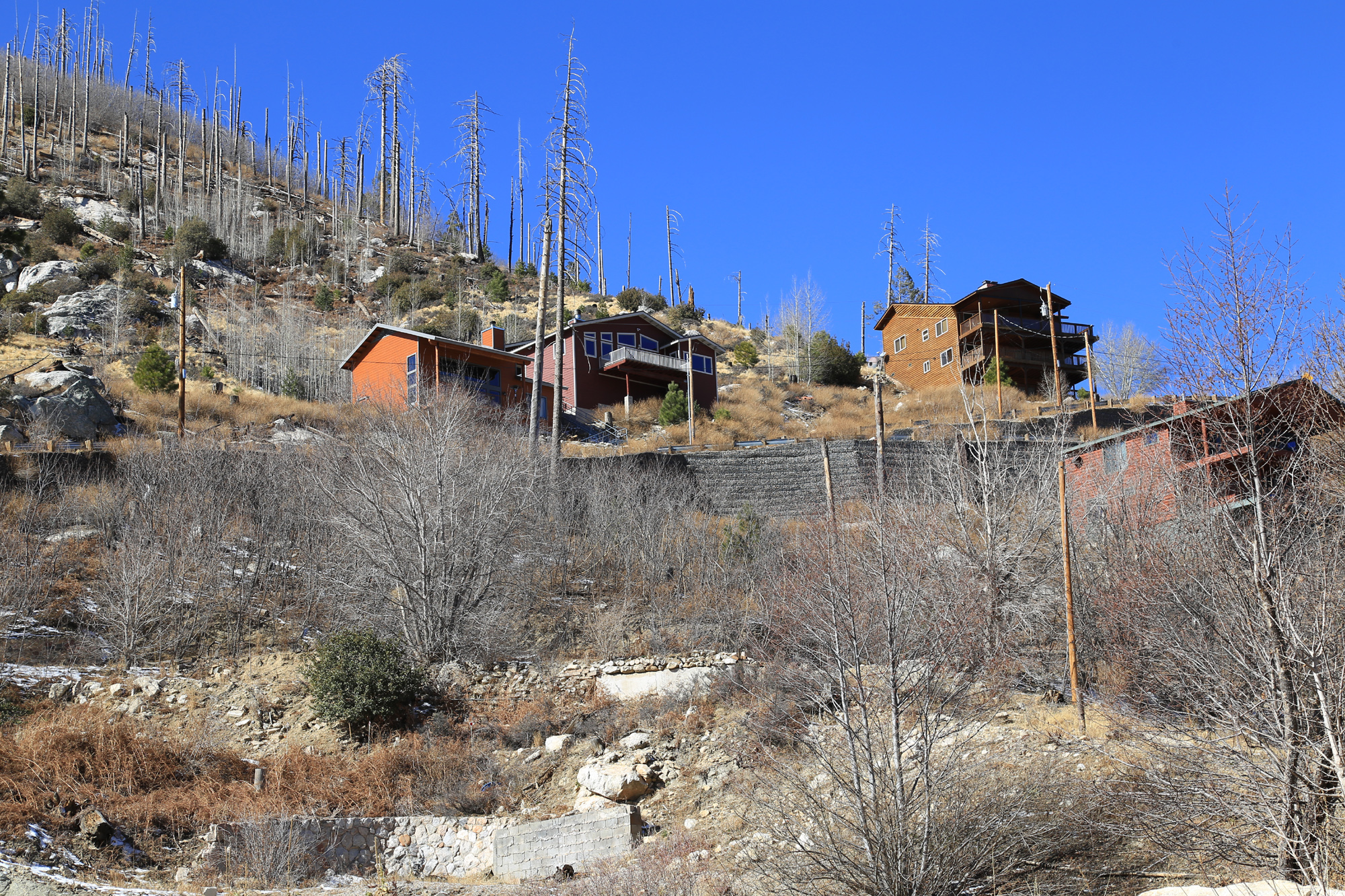
Cabins atop Mt Lemmon in Summerhaven

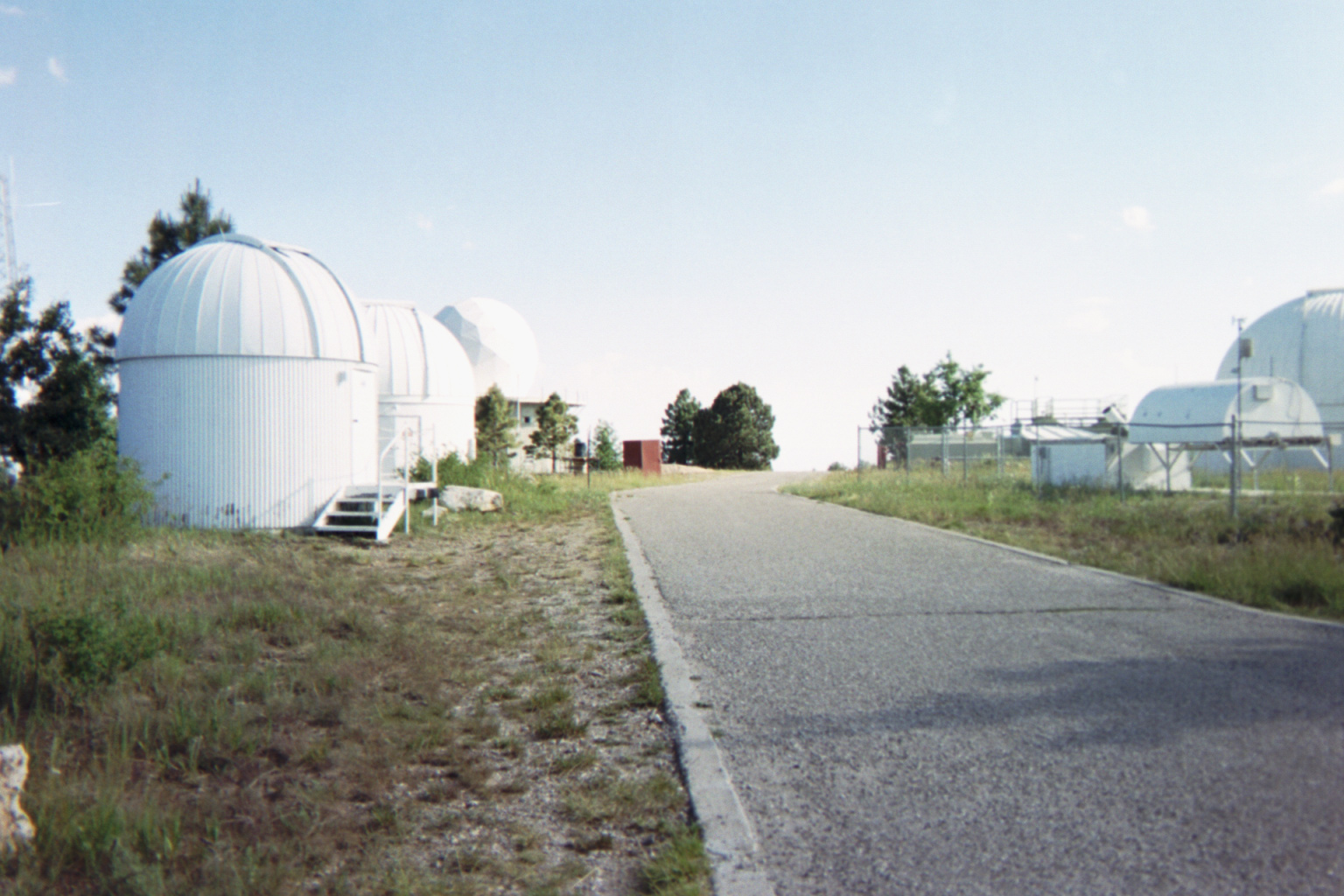
View of the telescopes on Mount Lemmon

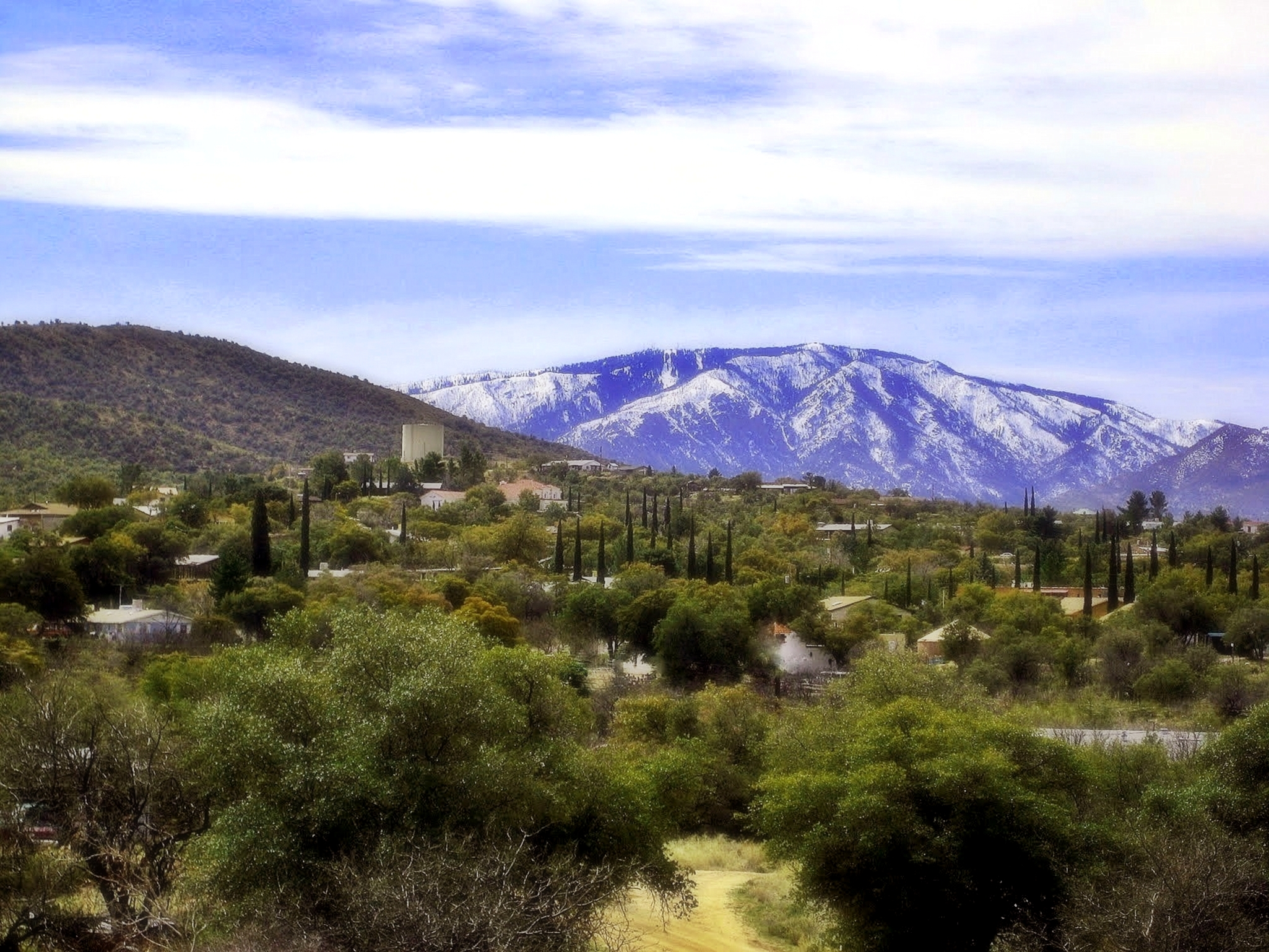
View of Mount Lemmon from Oracle, AZ

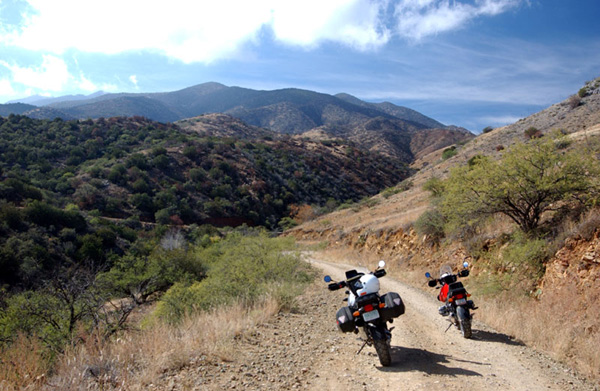
Unpaved road on the north or "backside" of Mount Lemmon

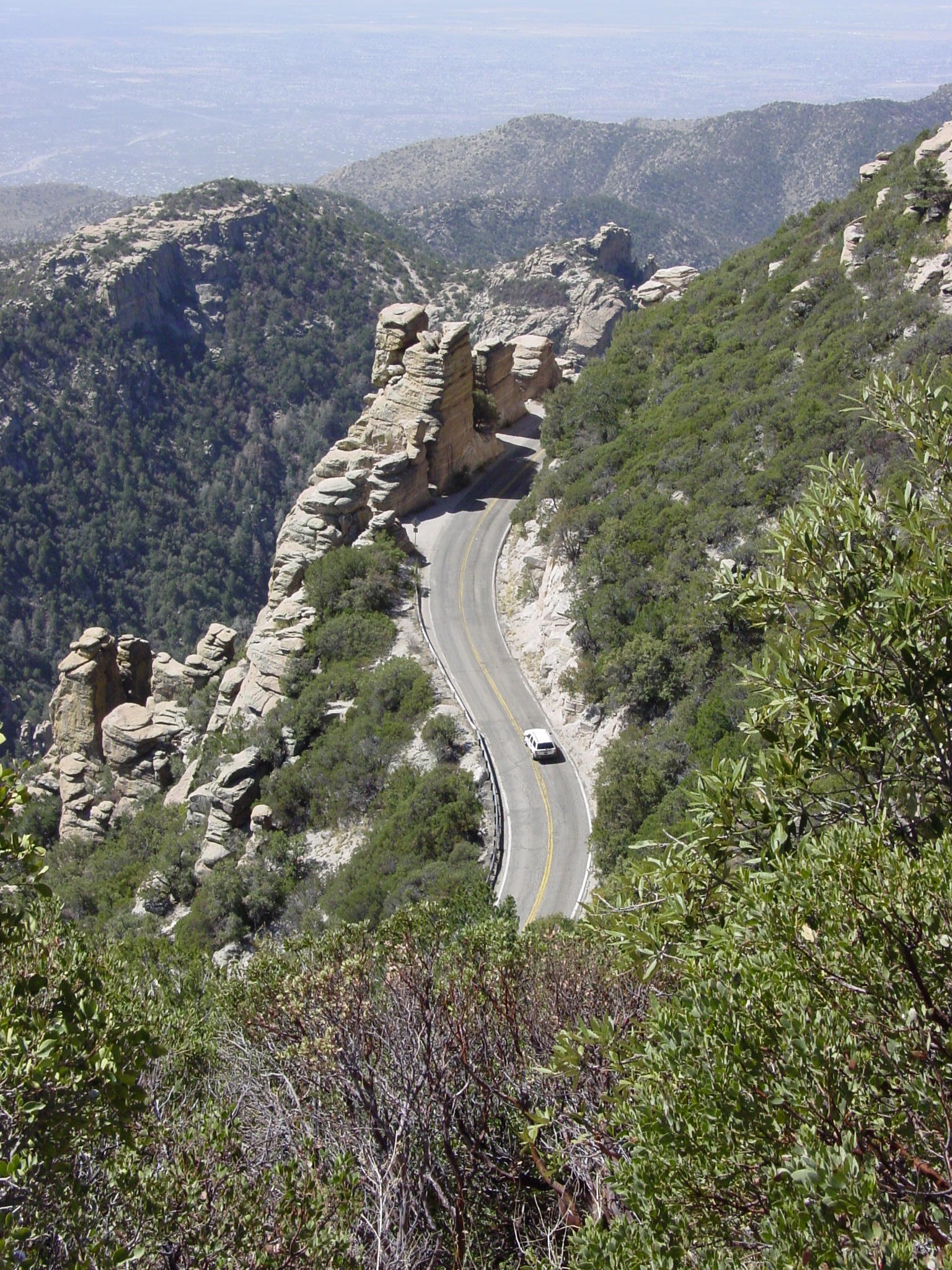
Catalina Highway climbing Mount Lemmon

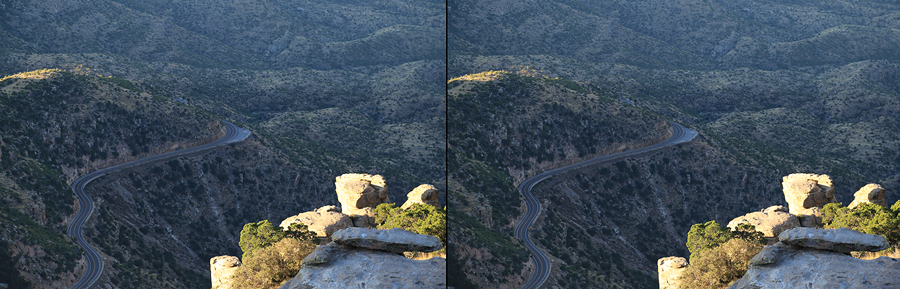
Stereograph of the Mt Lemmon Highway near Windy Point Vista.

== See also ==
- List of Ultras of the United States
- Mount Lemmon Observatory
- Mount Lemmon Ski Valley
- Mount Lemmon Survey
