= Tanque Verde, Arizona =

CDP in Pima County, Arizona

- Unincorporated community Census-designated place
- Location in Pima County and the state of Arizona

- Location in the United States
- Coordinates: 32°16′17″N 110°45′6″W
- Country: United States
- State: Arizona
- County: Pima

Area
  - Total: 32.29 sq mi (83.64 km^{2})
  - Land: 32.29 sq mi (83.64 km^{2})
  - Water: 0 sq mi (0.00 km^{2})
- Elevation: 2,671 ft (814 m)

Population (2020)
  - Total: 16,250
  - Density: 503.2/sq mi (194.29/km^{2})
- Time zone: UTC-7 (MST (no DST))
- FIPS code: 04-72000
- GNIS feature ID: 37549

Tanque Verde is a suburban unincorporated community in Pima County, Arizona, United States, northeast of Tucson. The population was 16,195 at the 2000 census. For statistical purposes, the United States Census Bureau has defined Tanque Verde as a census-designated place (CDP).

== History ==
Tanque Verde began as a small community, remote from Tucson, and settled by ranchers arriving to the American West around the 1860s. The name of the area, which means "green tank," is a reference to the algae in a large and prominent stock water tank in the area in the late 19th century.

The Tanque Verde Valley was used by the Apache, a Native American tribe throughout the 19th century. Soldiers from Fort Lowell operated by the U.S. Army in the late 19th century also frequented the Tanque Verde Valley.

In 1886, the residents of the Tanque Verde valley established the Tanque Verde School District as the first significant political entity of the community.

The army closed Fort Lowell in 1891, and when some Hispanic immigrants from Baja California and Sonora saw the fort's buildings standing empty, they moved into the abandoned adobes. Soon they began farming the rich floodplain northeast of the fort, where Pantano Wash feeds into Tanque Verde Creek to form the Rillito (Little River), and by the turn of the century the community they came to call El Fuerte was thriving. Upstream from El Fuerte, in the canyons and nooks (rincons) of the front range of the Santa Catalina Mountains and the Rincon range—the area they came to call Tanque Verde—Hispanic families with names like Escalante, Estrada, Andrade, Vindiola, Lopez, Riesgo, Benitez, Telles, Martinez, and Gallegos began establishing homes and ranches. Initially the largely self-sufficient community of homesteads thrived, but over time many of the smaller ranches were swallowed up by larger ones or sold to speculators. According to Frank Escalante, a descendant of Tanque Verde homesteaders, some non-Hispanic Americans robbed some of these families of their land titles and ranches by fraud or force. Some Hispanics who became Mexican Americans after the Gadsden Purchase had limited understanding of English and a naivete regarding American property law even four decades after the transition, and made easy marks for the unscrupulous. The infamous Arizona Rangers sometimes enforced interlopers' property claims. The First World War brought a rise in the market for cotton and the value of farmland, and still more of the original homesteaders felt pressured to sell. Ultimately the growth of Tucson and the demand for land for housing priced most of the remaining pioneers off their ranches.

In 1989, Tanque Verde was the main site for the Nickelodeon program Hey Dude.

By 2005, more than 1,600 students were enrolled in the school district's three schools, serving grades K–9. The Tanque Verde School District continues to register among the highest standardized test scores in Arizona.

As the Tucson area increased population, the Tanque Verde Valley did as well, but at a much slower rate. Much of the land in Tanque Verde is in covenants dictating land-use policies. These covenants strongly control growth and are considered by residents to ensure land preservation. By the 1960s, Tanque Verde had become a true suburb of Tucson.

Tanque Verde has become a community, with a significant equestrian presence.

== Geography ==
The Tanque Verde Valley is characterized by the Santa Catalina Mountains to the north, and the Rincon Mountains to the east. The Tanque Verde Valley is traversed by two notable seasonal creeks, Tanque Verde and Agua Caliente.

According to the United States Census Bureau, Tanque Verde has a total area of 32.9 square miles (85.1 km^{2}), all land. The river system in Arizona, including in Tanque Verde, is threatened by the increased pumping and diversion of water from the rivers and streams for agriculture, industrial, and domestic use.

== Demographics ==
Historical population
Census	Pop.	Note	%±
2020	16,250		—
U.S. Decennial Census

=== 2020 census ===
As of the 2020 census, Tanque Verde had a population of 16,250. The median age was 57.3 years. 15.3% of residents were under the age of 18 and 33.3% of residents were 65 years of age or older. For every 100 females, there were 96.6 males, and for every 100 females age 18 and over, there were 95.8 males.

85.8% of residents lived in urban areas, while 14.2% lived in rural areas.

There were 6,663 households in Tanque Verde, of which 20.6% had children under the age of 18 living in them. Of all households, 68.2% were married-couple households, 11.4% were households with a male householder and no spouse or partner present, and 15.9% were households with a female householder and no spouse or partner present. About 18.6% of all households were made up of individuals and 11.5% had someone living alone who was 65 years of age or older.

There were 7,287 housing units, of which 8.6% were vacant. The homeowner vacancy rate was 1.3% and the rental vacancy rate was 6.0%.

Racial composition as of the 2020 census
Race	Number	Percent
White	13,718	84.4%
Black or African American	125	0.8%
American Indian and Alaska Native	162	1.0%
Asian	278	1.7%
Native Hawaiian and Other Pacific Islander	16	0.1%
Some other race	353	2.2%
Two or more races	1,598	9.8%
Hispanic or Latino (of any race)	1,909	11.7%

=== 2000 census ===
At the 2000 census, there were 16,195 people, 5,810 households and 4,903 families residing in Tanque Verde. The population density was 492.7 inhabitants per square mile (190.2/km^{2}). There were 6,056 housing units at an average density of 184.3 per square mile (71.2/km^{2}). The racial makeup of Tanque Verde is 94.3% White, 0.7% Black or African American, 0.6% Native American, 1.3% Asian, 0.1% Pacific Islander, 1.4% from other races, and 1.7% from two or more races. 7.3% of the population were Hispanic or Latino of any race.

There were 5,810 households, of which 35.2% had children under the age of 18 living with them, 76.3% were married couples living together, 5.5% had a female householder with no husband present, and 15.6% were non-families. 12.2% of all households were made up of individuals, and 4.0% had someone living alone who was 65 years of age or older. The average household size was 2.77 and the average family size was 3.01.

25.3% of the population were under the age of 18, 4.9% from 18 to 24, 22.7% from 25 to 44, 35.1% from 45 to 64, and 12.0% who were 65 years of age or older. For every 100 females, there were 101.0 males. For every 100 females age 18 and over, there were 97.9 males.

The median household income was $80,530 and the median family income was $84,228. Males had a median income of $60,257 compared with $35,356 for females. The per capita income for Tanque Verde is $36,467. About 1.5% of families and 2.4% of the population were below the poverty line, including 1.6% of those under age 18 and 3.3% of those age 65 or over.

=== Demographic estimates ===
The cost of living index is 91.3.

== Education ==
The Tanque Verde area is served by two school districts: Tanque Verde Unified School District and Tucson Unified School District. The two high schools in the area are Sabino High School and Tanque Verde High School.
