= Catalina Federal Honor Camp =

WWII era internment camp for Japanese–Americans

Coordinates: 32.3371°N 110.7199°W

The Catalina Federal Honor Camp, or Tucson Federal Prison Camp, located in the Santa Catalina Mountains, held men subject to the World War II incarceration of Japanese Americans. It had no security fence, boundaries were marked with stones painted white. 45 of the 46 prisoners were draft resisters and objectors of conscience transferred from camps in Colorado, Arizona and Utah, although Gordon Hirabayashi, who had challenged the exclusion of Japanese Americans from the West Coast, was also held here.

The camp was established in the Coronado National Forest in 1939, under the authority of the U.S. Bureau of Prisons, with plans to use inmate labor to build a highway connecting Tucson, Arizona to the mountains. Expanded in the 1940s, the Honor Camp consisted of four prisoner barracks, a mess hall, laundry facilities, power and storage facilities, a garage, a vocational shop, one classroom, an administration building, fifteen cottages for prison staff, and water and sewage systems; a baseball field and farmland were also part of the Honor Camp facilities. Most of the draft resisters brought to the camp were transferred from the Amache, Colorado (a concentration camp), although others came from Poston, Arizona and Topaz, Utah; all were transported in leg irons and under armed guard. Gordon Hirabayashi, on the other hand, convicted in 1943 of violating one of the civilian exclusion orders against Japanese Americans when he refused to go along with the government "relocation", hitchhiked from Spokane, Washington to the Catalina labor camp. The inmates performed road work for what would become the Catalina Highway, drilling holes for dynamite, breaking rocks with sledgehammers and clearing trees, as well as growing food and cooking for the prison population.

Hirabayashi served out his two 90-day sentences, and the draft resisters were pardoned in 1947, but the prison remained open until the highway was completed in 1951, when it became a labor camp for juvenile offenders. In 1967, the State of Arizona took over the camp and converted it to a youth rehabilitation center. The rehabilitation center closed in 1973 and the buildings were destroyed soon after, but many foundations and walls of the old structures remain. Today, the site serves as a campground and trail head, and is known as the Gordon Hirabayashi Recreation Site to honor the camp's best-known inmate (whose conviction was overturned in 1987, after it was discovered that government officials withheld evidence that would have supported his case).
