= Aspen Fire =

2003 wildfire in Pima County, Arizona, USA

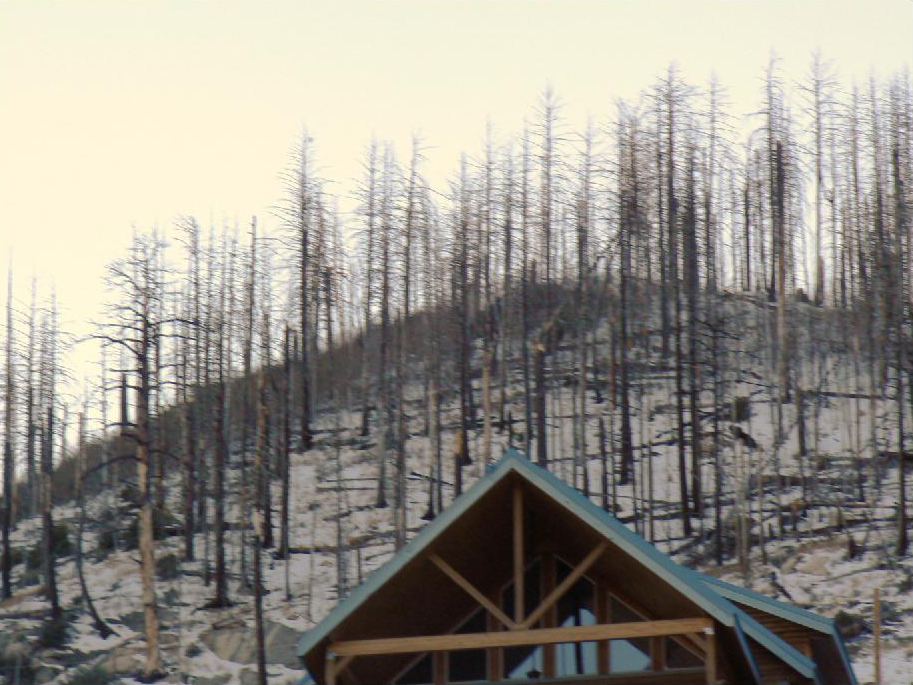
- Mt.Lemmon Summerhaven Recovery From Aspen Fire
- Date: June 17, 2003 – July 12, 2003
- Location: Summerhaven, Mount Lemmon, Arizona
- Coordinates: 32.437013°N 110.764365°W

Statistics
- Burned area: 84,750 acres (343 km^{2})

Impacts
- Structures lost: 340

Map
- Location within Arizona

The Aspen Fire burned from June 17, 2003, for about a month on Mount Lemmon, part of the Santa Catalina Mountains located in the Coronado National Forest north of Tucson, Arizona, and in the surrounding area. It burned 84,750 acres (343.0 km^{2}) (132.4 sq mi) of land, and destroyed 340 homes and businesses of the town of Summerhaven.

Damages to electric lines, phone lines, water facilities, streets and sewers totaled $4.1 million. Firefighting cost was about $17 million, and the Forest Service is spending $2.7 million to prevent soil loss.

In 2002, the year before the fire started, Congress had been requested to allocate about $2 million to cover the implementation of fire prevention measures in the Coronado National Forest. However, that allocation was reduced to about $150,000 in the Congressional budget process.

There were originally suspicions that the fire was caused by a lightning strike, but it was eventually determined to be human-caused.

The Aspen Fire, south of center, had the largest smoke plume of all the fires.

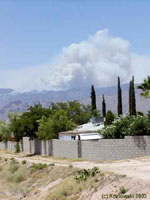
The Aspen Fire in the Santa Catalina Mountains north of Tucson, Arizona.
