= Gordon Hirabayashi =

American sociologist (1918–2012)

Gordon Hirabayashi 平林潔
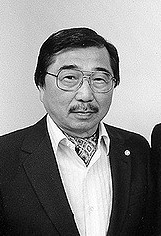
- Gordon Hirabayashi in 1986
- Born: April 23, 1918; Seattle, Washington, U.S.
- Died: January 2, 2012 (aged 93); Edmonton, Alberta, Canada
- Education: University of Washington
- Known for: Hirabayashi v. United States
- Spouse(s): Esther Schmoe (m. 1944; div. 1970), Susan Carnahan (second wife, widow)
- Children: Marion Oldenburg (daughter), Sharon Yuen (daughter), Jay Hirabayashi (son)
- Scientific career
- Fields: Sociology
- Thesis: The Russian Doukhobors of British Columbia: a study of social adjustment and conflict (1951)
- Doctoral advisor: Robert E.L. Faris

Gordon Kiyoshi Hirabayashi (平林潔, Hirabayashi Kiyoshi; April 23, 1918 – January 2, 2012) was an American sociologist whose principled resistance to the Japanese American internment during World War II included a 1943 Supreme Court challenge decided under the caption Hirabayashi v. United States. His conviction was overturned in 1986. Hirabayashi posthumously received the Presidential Medal of Freedom in 2012.

== Early life ==
Hirabayashi was born in Seattle to a Christian family who was associated with the Mukyōkai Christian Movement. He graduated from Auburn Senior High School in Auburn, Washington, and in 1937 went to the University of Washington, where he received his degree. At the university he participated in the YMCA and became a religious pacifist.

== Resistance to internment, discrimination and war ==
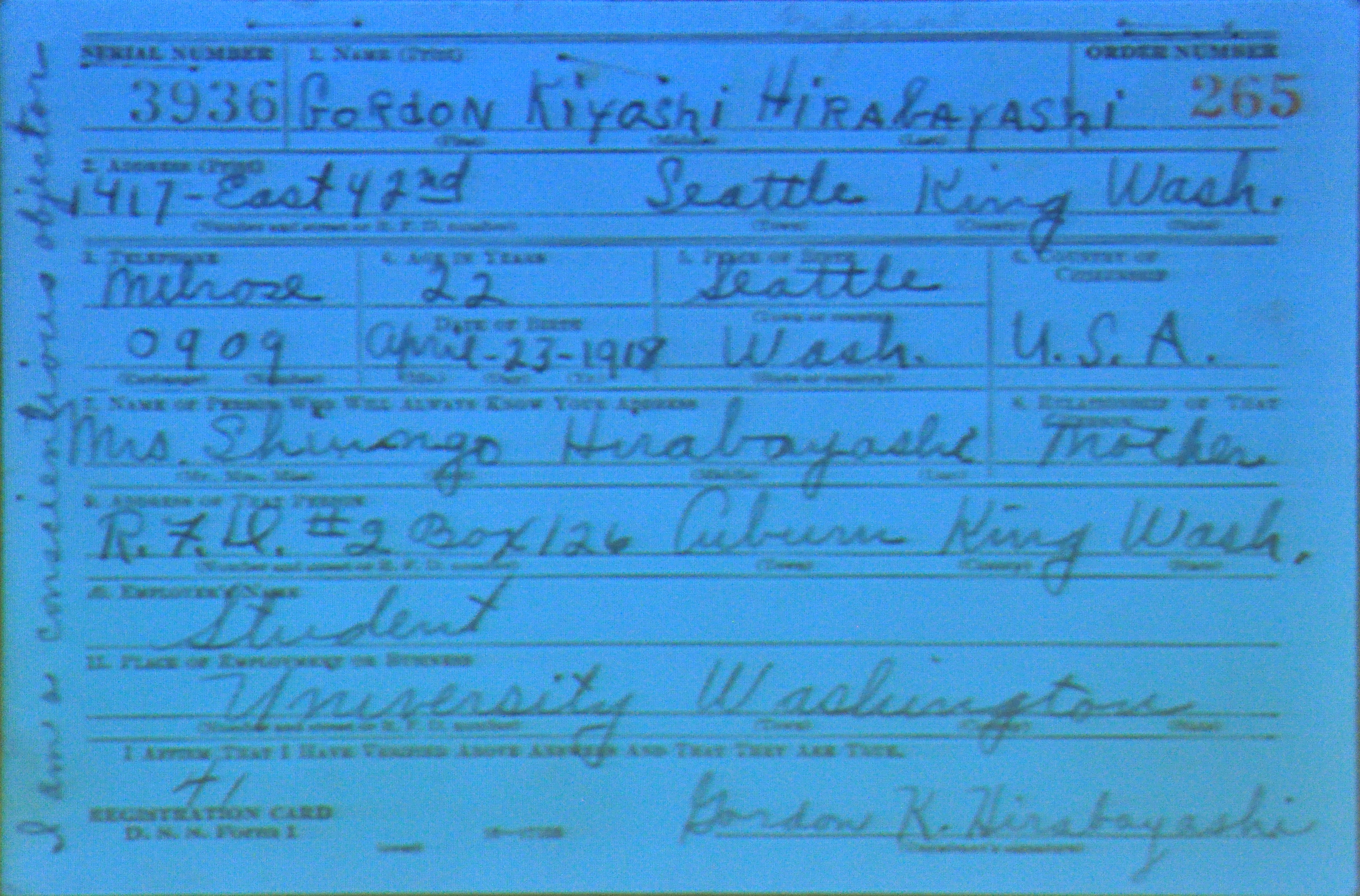
Gordon Hirabayashi's draft registration card. Written in the left-hand margin: "I am a conscientious objector."

Although Hirabayashi had originally considered accepting internment, he ultimately became one of three to openly defy it. He joined the Quaker-run American Friends Service Committee. In 1942 he turned himself in to the FBI, and after being convicted for curfew violation was sentenced to 90 days in prison. He invited prosecution with the intention of challenging the legality of internment in the appellate courts. The ACLU initially denied support, which was instead provided by an independent committee organized by Washington State Senator Mary Farquharson. When Hirabayashi's case reached the U.S. Supreme Court, the ACLU took an active part. One of his lawyers was the Philadelphia Quaker attorney Harold Evans. The Supreme Court unanimously ruled against him in Hirabayashi v. United States (1943), albeit with three Justices filing separate opinions that concurred with the Court's decision only with certain reservations.

Given wartime exigencies, officials would not transport him to prison or even pay his train fare, so he hitchhiked to the prison in Arizona where he had been ordered to serve his sentence. Once there, wardens stated they lacked the sufficient papers as he was two weeks late. They considered letting him just go home, but he feared this would look suspicious. After that they made the suggestion he could go out for dinner and a movie, which would give them time to find his papers. He agreed to this and, by the time he finished doing so, they had found the relevant paperwork.

Hirabayashi later spent a year in federal prison at McNeil Island Penitentiary for refusing induction into the armed forces, contending that a questionnaire sent to Japanese Americans demanding renunciation of allegiance to the emperor of Japan was racially discriminatory because other ethnic groups were not asked about adherence to foreign leaders.

== Post-war career ==
After the war, he went on to earn B.A., M.A. and Ph.D. degrees in sociology from the University of Washington. He taught in Beirut, Lebanon and Cairo, Egypt, before settling at the University of Alberta in Canada in 1959, where he served as chair of the sociology department from 1970 until 1975. He continued to teach until his retirement in 1983. As a sociologist, he conducted studies of Jordan and the Doukhobors in British Columbia, Egyptian village political awareness, Jordanian social change, and Asian-Americans. He was an active member of Canadian Yearly Meeting of the Religious Society of Friends (Quakers). After retirement, he continued to support causes for human rights.

Hirabayashi died on January 2, 2012, at age 93, in Edmonton, Alberta. He had been diagnosed with Alzheimer's disease 11 years earlier.

== Conviction overturned ==
Soon after retiring, Hirabayashi received a call from Peter Irons, a professor of political science at the University of California, San Diego. Irons told Hirabayashi that he had uncovered documents revealing government misconduct in justifying the relocations when challenged. These documents showed that the government knew in 1942 there was no military reason for the exclusion order but misrepresented and withheld that information from the United States Supreme Court. With this new evidence, Hirabayashi was able to reopen his case in the United States District Court for the Western District of Washington, which ordered that one of Hirabayashi's two convictions be vacated. On appeal, the Court of Appeals for the Ninth Circuit held that both convictions were invalid and directed the issuance of a writ of coram nobis.

Hirabayashi would later say of the case, "It was quite a strong victory—so strong that the other side did not appeal. It was a vindication of all the effort people had put in for the rights of citizens during crisis periods." He also commented, "There was a time when I felt that the Constitution failed me. But with the reversal in the courts and in public statements from the government, I feel that our country has proven that the Constitution is worth upholding. The U.S. government admitted it made a mistake. A country that can do that is a strong country. I have more faith and allegiance to the Constitution than I ever had before."

"I would also say that if you believe in something, if you think the Constitution is a good one, and if you think the Constitution protects you, you better make sure that the Constitution is actively operating... in other words 'constant vigilance'. Otherwise, it's a scrap of paper. We had the Constitution to protect us in 1942. It didn't because the will of the people weren't behind it."

In 2008, the University of Washington awarded Hirabayashi and four hundred former students of Japanese ancestry who were evacuated from the school honorary degrees "nunc pro tunc" (retroactively).

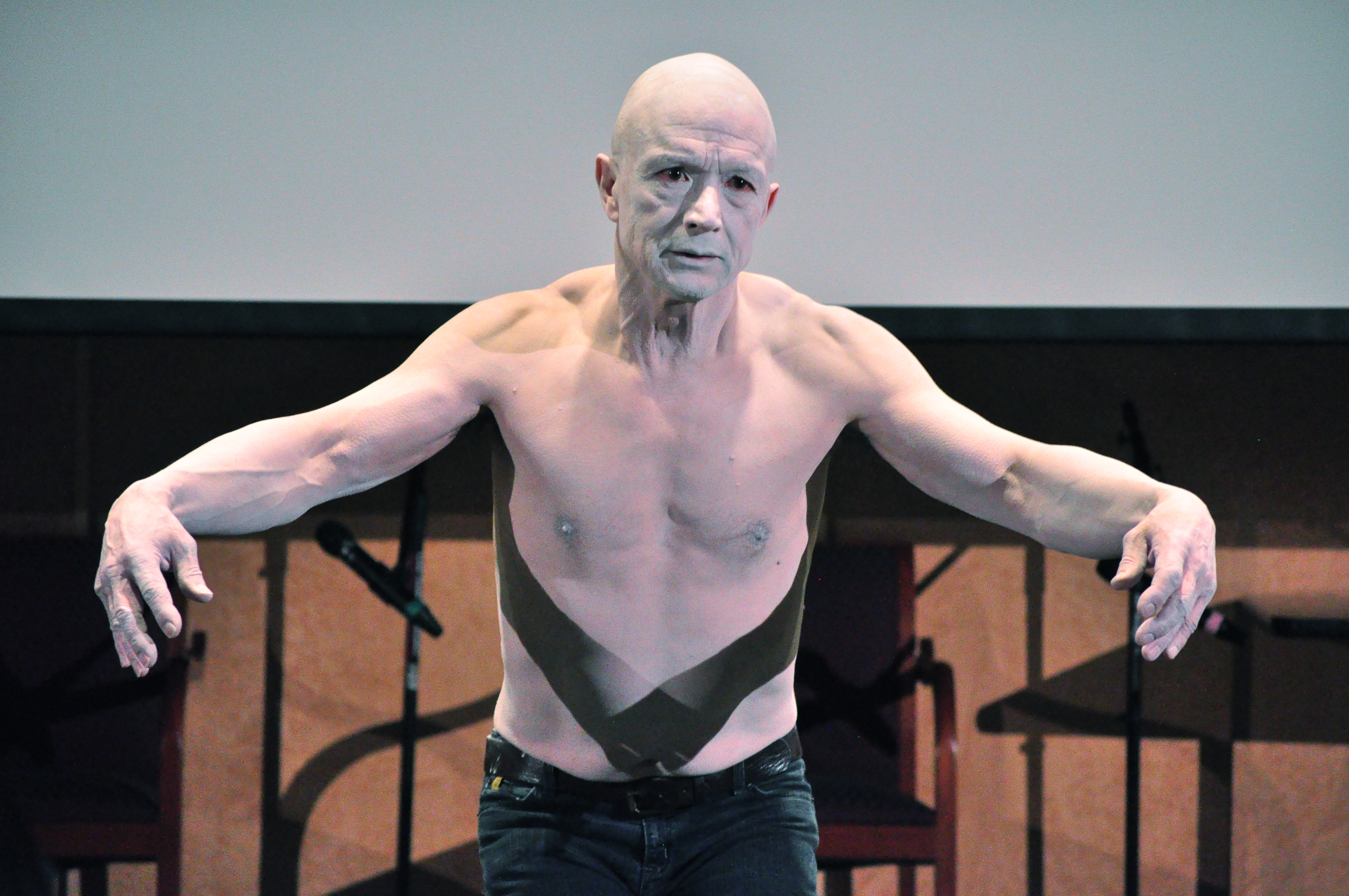
Gordon's son Jay Hirabayashi performs a butoh dance piece in memory of his parents, Gordon and Esther Hirabayashi, at a Day of Remembrance event in Seattle, Washington, February 22, 2014.

On May 24, 2011, the U.S. Acting Solicitor General, Neal Katyal delivered the keynote speech at the Department of Justice's Great Hall marking Asian American and Pacific Islander Heritage Month. Developing comments he had posted officially on May 20, Katyal issued the Justice Department's first public confession of its 1942 ethics lapse. He cited the Hirabayashi and Korematsu cases as blots on the reputation of the Office of the Solicitor General – whom the Supreme Court explicitly considers as deserving of "special credence" when arguing cases – and as "an important reminder" of the need for absolute candor in arguing the United States government's position on every case.

== Public honors ==
=== Gordon Hirabayashi Campground ===
In 1999, the Coronado National Forest renamed the former Catalina Federal Honor Camp, about ten miles northeast of Tucson, Arizona, in honor of Gordon Hirabayashi, who served a 90 day sentence of hard labor there in 1943. Gordon Hirabayashi attended the dedication ceremony. Now called the Gordon Hirabayashi Campground, it offers a public campground.

=== Keynotes Speaker at INS Heritage Month Observances in Chicago ===
In June 2001, the Immigration and Naturalization Service’s Chicago District Office marked Asian Pacific Heritage Month with two observances recounting the injustices suffered by Japanese Americans during World War II.

Gordon Hirabayashi was keynote speaker at O’Hare International Airport on June 4. The program was repeated the next day in the Ceremonial Courtroom of the Dirksen Federal Building, next door to the district office. Both programs screened the PBS documentary A Personal Matter: Gordon Hirabayashi vs. United States, which details his fight to defend constitutional rights amid wartime hysteria. Hirabayashi also spoke about the discrimination faced by nearly all Asian Americans in the decades before the war.

=== California State Legislature ===
On January 5, 2012, three days after Hirabayashi's death, assembly members Yamada and Furutani were granted unanimous consent in the California State Assembly to adjourn in memory of Gordon Hirabayashi.

=== Presidential Medal of Freedom ===
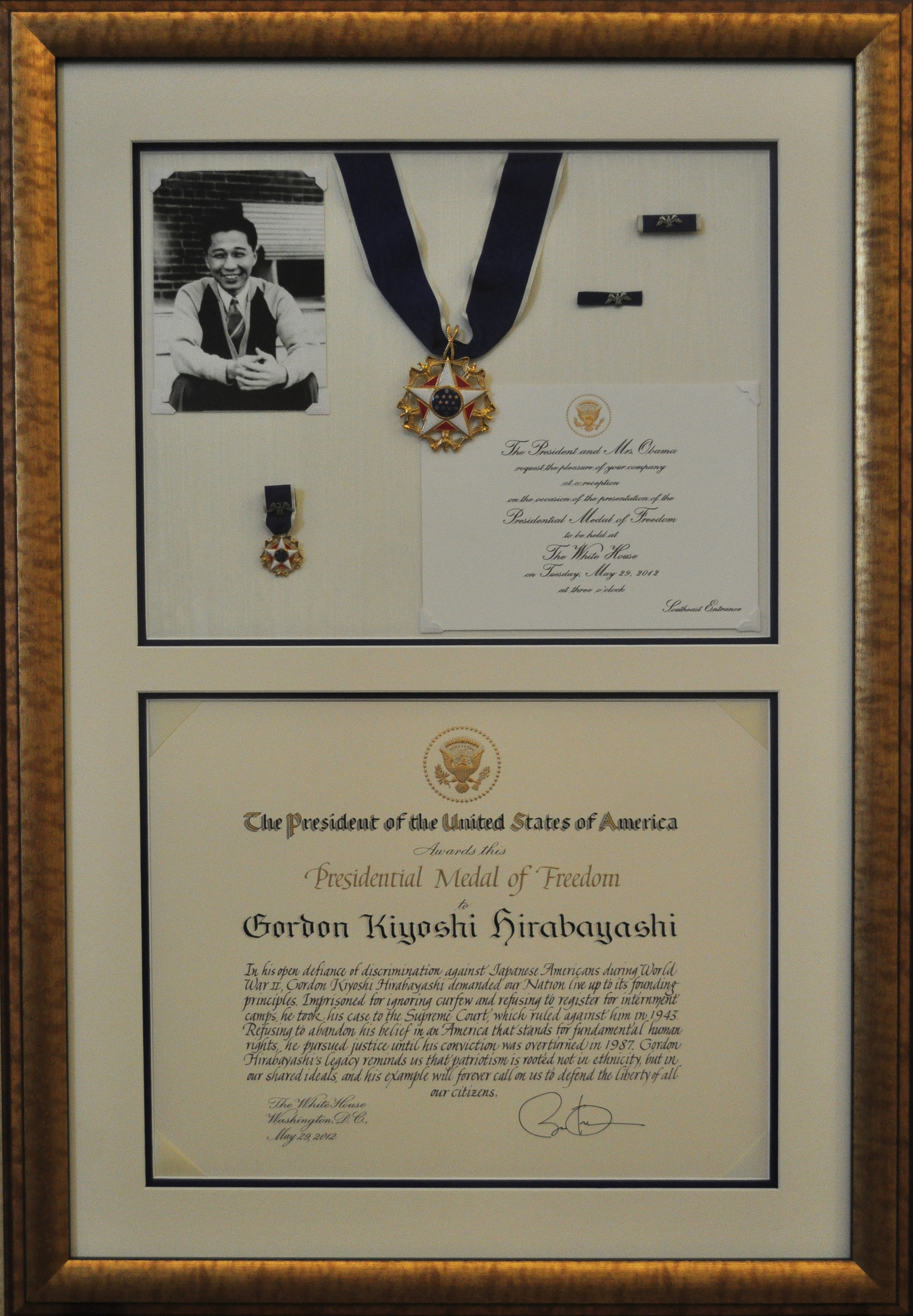
Hirabayashi's Medal of Freedom and certificate

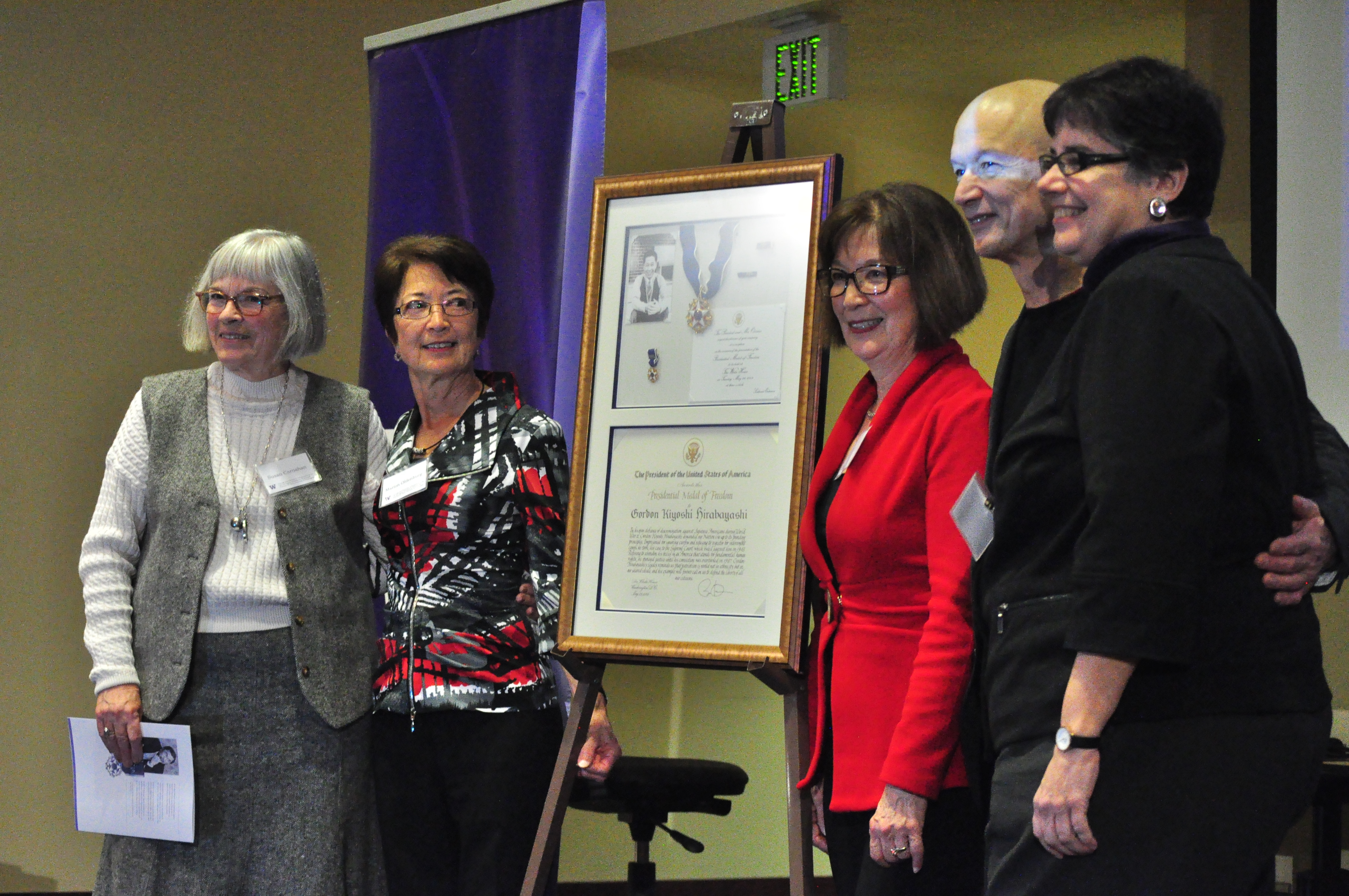
Members of Hirabayashi's family pose with his Presidential Medal of Freedom immediately after it was unveiled as a donation to the University of Washington Library Special Collections. Left to right: Susan Carnahan (second wife, widow), Marion Oldenburg (daughter), Sharon Yuen (daughter), Jay Hirabayashi (son); University of Washington Provost Ana Mari Cauce accepting the donation on behalf of the university.

On April 27, 2012, President Barack Obama announced that Hirabayashi would receive the Presidential Medal of Freedom for his principled stand against Japanese-American internment. The President presented the award posthumously on May 29. It was accepted by his widow, Susan Carnahan, who traveled to Washington from Edmonton, Alberta, Canada. On February 22, 2014, the medal was formally donated to the University of Washington Library Special Collections, which holds Hirabayashi's papers.

== Personal life ==
Hirabayashi married his college sweetheart, Esther Schmoe, in a simple Quaker ceremony at Spokane’s Lidgerwood Evangelical Church on July 29, 1944. Their ceremony received coverage in the local newspapers, given the rarity of interracial marriages at the time. As he knew he would soon be in prison, the couple decided to get married quickly while Hirabayashi was out on bail. They had three children, twin daughters, Marion and Sharon (born July 1945 in Seattle), son, Jay (born 1947 in Seattle). They divorced in 1970, and passed away within hours of each other in January 2012.

== Stage play ==
In 2007, the Asian American theatre company East West Players gave the world premiere of Dawn's Light: The Journey of Gordon Hirabayashi, a one-man show written by Jeanne Sakata, directed by Jessica Kubzansky and starring Ryun Yu. It ran at the David Henry Hwang Theatre in Little Tokyo, Los Angeles, from previews on November 1–4 through a closing on December 2, 2007. The Los Angeles Times gave it a mixed review.

In 2008, Sakata cut the play from about 90 minutes to about 45 for a school tour by East West Players' Theatre For Youth program. Kubzansky directed again, and Martin Yu, the original production's understudy, starred. A second youth tour followed in 2010 with a lightly revised script, a new director, Leslie Ishii, and a new star, Blake Kushi. It was the first time a Japanese American director and actor led the production. Sponsored by Southern California Edison, the tour gave 35 performances in 18 California cities from February 12 to March 31, at schools, community centers, churches, libraries and one city college. A review by Pasadena City College Courier staff praised Kushi's performance. In January 2011, Ryun Yu reprised the role in Chicago, where Silk Road Theatre Project staged three performances at Millennium Park's Jay Pritzker Pavilion.

In 2012, Sakata renamed the play Hold These Truths. Epic Theatre Ensemble ran an off-Broadway premiere from October 21 to November 18, starring Joel de la Fuente. Hurricane Sandy struck during the second week, and performances were suspended for two weeks. Later productions included:

- People's Light and Theatre Company, Malvern, Pennsylvania (2014, de la Fuente; again in 2022 with Steven Eng)
- ACT Theatre, Seattle (2014, Yu)
- Plays & Players Theatre, Philadelphia (2015, Makoto Hirano)
- Portland Center Stage (2016, Yu)
- New York and Boston (December 2017)
- San Diego (November 2019)
- San Francisco Playhouse (2021)

In May 2022, the University of Alberta in Edmonton staged the first Canadian production, directed by Melanie Dreyer-Lude and starring Kevin Takahide Lee. Luna Stage in West Orange, New Jersey, opened its 2026–27 season with the play, directed by Lisa Rothe and starring de la Fuente, from September 24 to October 18, 2026.

== See also ==
- List of civil rights leaders
