= Tanque Verde Unified School District =

School district in Arizona, United States

Address
- 2300 North Tanque Verde Loop Tucson, Arizona, 85749; United States

District information
- Type: Public
- Grades: PreK–12
- NCES District ID: 0408280

Students and staff
- Students: 2,127
- Teachers: 121.97
- Staff: 109.81
- Student–teacher ratio: 17.44

Other information
- Website: www.tanqueverdeschools.org

Tanque Verde Unified School District 13 is a school district in Pima County, Arizona.

== Schools ==
The District includes:

- Tanque Verde Community Preschool
- Agua Caliente Elementary School
- Tanque Verde Elementary School
- Emily Gray Junior High School
- Tanque Verde High School
