= Canyon del Oro High School =

Coordinates: 32°22′25.03″N 110°58′12.63″W

Location
- 25 West Calle Concordia; Oro Valley, Arizona 85704; United States

Information
- School type: Public high school
- Motto: 'Más Allá (Spanish, "Go Beyond")
- Established: 1962 (64 years ago)
- School district: Amphitheater Public Schools
- CEEB code: 030473
- Principal: Tara Bulleigh
- Teaching staff: 79.00 (on FTE basis)
- Grades: 9–12
- Enrollment: 1,737 (2023–2024)
- Student to teacher ratio: 21.99
- Campus size: 68.08 acres (27.55 ha)
- Campus type: Suburban
- Colors: Forest green and gold
- Mascot: Dorados
- Website: cdo.amphi.com

Canyon del Oro High School (CDO) is a comprehensive public high school in Oro Valley, Arizona, located 6 miles (9.7 km) north of Tucson at the base of Pusch Ridge in the western foothills of the Santa Catalina Mountains. Established in 1964, CDO is one of three high schools of Amphitheater Public Schools and serves about 1,600 students in grades 9–12. CDO was an International Baccalaureate (IB) member school. The school name originates from Canyon del Oro (Spanish for Canyon of Gold) in the Santa Catalina Mountains, and the historic name of nearby Steam Pump Ranch on the National Register of Historic Places (named the Canyon del Oro Ranch when purchased by George Pusch in the late-1800s). The school mascot is the Dorado, a mythical Latin American warrior. The school colors are forest green and gold.

CDO is primarily known for its academic program and the notable number of Major League Baseball players the school has produced in recent decades. Additionally, CDO is consistently ranked among the top high schools in the U.S. by U.S. News & World Report and Newsweek Magazine. Specifically, in 2007, 2010, and again in 2011–2019, Newsweek Magazine rated CDO in the top 5% of public schools in the U.S. In 2011, Newsweek ranked CDO No. 408 in its list of top public schools in the U.S. (top 1.5 percent nationally). The Arizona Department of Education has consistently awarded CDO the highest rating in its system, most recently designating CDO an "A" grade school in 2024, and the Arizona Educational Foundation designated CDO a 2025 A+ School of Excellence. CDO regularly graduates students recognized by the National Merit Scholarship Program, and between 2000 and 2010, CDO graduated 42 National Merit Scholarship Semifinalists. CDO has the second-highest number of Academic Decathlon State Titles among Arizona high schools, crowned as State Champions in 2006, 2009, 2011, and five consecutive titles from 2014 to 2018. CDO also has a long history of students excelling in the annual Arizona State Math Contest, including first-place finishes. CDO is also ranked in the top Arizona schools for among the highest number of athletic state titles in large school sports (Arizona Interscholastic Association).

== Recent notable awards and recognition ==
- 2025: Arizona Educational Foundation designated CDO a 2025 A+ School of Excellence.
- 2019-2020: U.S. News & World Report recognized CDO on their "Best High Schools" list in 2012, 2013, 2015, 2016, 2017, and most recently in 2019–2020
- 2018: CDO won its fifth consecutive Academic Decathlon State Championship, for a total of eight State Titles.
- 2011: Newsweek ranked CDO 408th on its list of the nation's top public high schools (top 1.5% in the U.S.) CDO Won the state competition in Academic Decathlon and ranked 5th nationally
- 2010: CDO finished as State Runner-Up in the Academic Decathlon state competition, and ranked 7th nationally
- 2009: Kenzie Fowler was named the Gatorade National Softball Player of the Year in 2009 for the second consecutive year, and the first softball player to ever win the award twice. Fowler became only the 6th athlete in any sport to win the national honor twice, joining the ranks of basketball player LeBron James, and track star Marion Jones. Fowler ended her pitching career at CDO with a 105–8 record, and a 0.15 ERA in 685 1/3 innings. With the honor, the media noted that the award arguably cemented "Fowler as the best-ever modern high school softball player." Also in 2009, CDO teams finished as the 4A Division I Softball State Champions, 4A Division I Baseball State Champions, Fourth Place in the U.S. Academic Decathlon National Competition, Arizona Academic Decathlon State Champions, 4A Division I Girls' Basketball State Champions, and 4A Division I Boys' Soccer State Champions.
- 2008: Kenzie Fowler received high school softball's most prestigious award, being named the Gatorade National Softball Player of the Year in 2008. Fowler was the first junior to ever win Gatorade's softball award, and just the second athlete from Arizona to win the national honor in any sport. CDO's Bre Ladd was the other Arizona athlete, named Gatorade's National Volleyball Player of the Year in 2002. Also in 2008, CDO had a first place student finish in the Arizona State Math Contest, with four other students placed in the state's top 50 scorers, First place finish at the Southern Arizona Regional Science Fair, 4A Division I Softball State Champions, Softball team finished the season ranked 5th nationally by USA Today, and Arizona Academic Decathlon State Runner-Up and ranked in the top 20 nationally.
- 2007': 4A Division I Softball State Champions, 4A Division I Boys' Soccer State Runner-Up, 4A Division I Football State Runner-Up, Newsweek Magazines list of the top 5% of public schools in the U.S., Arizona Academic Decathlon State Runner-Up, Softball team finished the season ranked 2nd nationally by USA Today.
- 2006: Arizona Academic Decathlon State Champions, 5th place in the National Academic Decathlon, 4A Division I Girls' Track & Field State Champions, Five students placed in the state's top 50 scorers in the Arizona State Math Contest, with another 10 students scoring in the top 10 percent in the state.
- Named an Excelling School by the Arizona Department of Education (2005–present).
- Southern Region Academic Decathlon Champions (2002–2023).

== History ==
=== Financing through bonds ===
The dramatic population growth in the Amphitheater School District during the 1950s placed increasing demands on the district's existing schools. Enrollment reached capacity at the district's sole high school, Amphitheater High School, in the late 1950s. As a result, District Superintendent Marion Donaldson developed a bond proposal in June 1959 that included the purchase of a second high school site in the district. Voters approved the $1.9 million bonds ($12.8 million in 2006) by a 4 to 1 margin. Population growth in the area north of the Rillito River and Tucson was rapidly expanding, and the original 40 acres (160,000 m^{2}) purchased for the second high school was then determined to initially serve a middle school population as well. Another bond issue was proposed for the construction of Canyon del Oro School in June 1961, with $1.4 million ($9.2 million in 2006) for the first phase of the school, and $2.3 million ($15.3 million in 2006) for expansion of the school. Voters again approved the bonds by a 3 to 1 margin (Amphitheater by Peyton Reavis, 1981).

=== Canyon del Oro Junior High School ===
Canyon del Oro School opened as a junior high school in the fall of 1962 with only a seventh grade class. The campus was only a few buildings with a large grass courtyard accessed by Calle Concordia, which was then only a small dirt road. Land values north of Tucson were beginning to appreciate through the 1950s, and many residents of the Amphitheater School District expressed concern that the site of the school in the foothills of the Santa Catalina Mountains was too costly (Amphitheater by Peyton Reavis, 1981).

The school added a new grade level each year, and Canyon del Oro High School was established in the fall of 1964 with a ninth grade class. CDO was formally declared a high school by the Arizona on July 1, 1965, serving grades 9–10, with only a few hundred students. Canyon del Oro Junior High School would continue operation on the same campus as a distinct school, serving grades 7–8 until 1974, when L.W. Cross Junior High School was established on a separate campus to accommodate grades 7–8.

=== Canyon del Oro High School ===
Construction continued on the high school campus, and CDO gained recognition as a school with state-of-the-art facilities, and drew students from Tucson's northern suburbs. The campus was designed in a Modernist style by architects Bernard Friedman and Fred Jobusch (Friedman & Jobusch) to be completed in phases. Friedman & Jobusch also designed the contemporary Main Library at the University of Arizona in 1976, along with the University of Arizona College of Medicine, the Tucson Music Hall, and laboratories at Kitt Peak National Observatory.

The Modernist style incorporated into the Canyon del Oro campus design in the early 1960s is a significant example of the Modernist movement that dominated in the U.S. following World War II. The Canyon del Oro campus represents a shift in 20th-century American architecture when Modernism was favored over traditional styles in an effort to project American progress. The gymnasium at the school featured a four-sided score board suspended above the basketball court (Amphitheater by Peyton Reavis, 1981).

The CDO campus expanded with the gradual population increase north of Tucson, and the first graduating class was in the spring of 1968. New construction occurred through the late 1990s, adding technology and laboratory science facilities for chemistry, physics, and biology. A second gymnasium was completed in the 1970s, along with an expanded library, fine arts complex, and bookstore. As of 2007, the campus included 21 buildings on 68 acres (280,000 m^{2}).

Among the most notable families whose children attended CDO during the 1960s and 1970s was the Udall family. Mo Udall represented much of southern Arizona in the U.S. House of Representatives at the time, and his brother Stewart Udall served as president of the Amphitheater School Board before later serving as Secretary of the Interior under U.S. Presidents John F. Kennedy and Lyndon B. Johnson. Mark Udall, who later served as a U.S. congressman and U.S. Senator from Colorado, was CDO's first student body president.

From the 1960s through the 1980s, CDO became a dominating presence in golf and tennis, capturing the respective state titles nearly each year. CDO also won back-to-back state championships in both basketball and football in the late 1970s. The CDO girls' basketball team registered an undefeated 28–0 record in 1987, capturing the 5A State title (Arizona Interscholastic Association).

=== Substantial growth ===
As the Oro Valley area experienced significant population growth in the 1990s, enrollment at CDO increased as well. At its enrollment peak, CDO served a student population of nearly 3,100 in 2001. CDO had the highest enrollment of any high school in southern Arizona, and was one of the largest schools in the state. The growth and desirability of Oro Valley (the fastest growing municipality in Arizona for several years in the 1990s), was often credited by the media to CDO and the educational reputation the school established (Arizona Daily Star). In 2001, CDO received relief as the Amphitheater School District opened Ironwood Ridge, the district's third high school, in northwestern Oro Valley.

=== Current state of the school ===
Canyon del Oro continues to register among the highest standardized test scores in Arizona, and a notable number of National Merit Scholars. CDO is one of the few high schools consistently designated as "Excelling" (the highest academic distinction) by the Arizona Department of Education. Canyon del Oro High School celebrated its 50th anniversary of establishment in the fall of 2014.

=== Notable events ===
On September 21, 1999, 1,500 students (roughly half the student population) walked out of classes in protest of low teacher pay. The students walked nearly 8 miles to the Amphitheater District offices at 701 W. Wetmore Rd. In solidarity, many of the teachers chose not to mark students absent from classes.

== Academics ==
Throughout CDO's history, the school has continually ranked among the top high schools in Arizona in standardized test administrations and academic performance evaluations by the Arizona Department of Education. As a comprehensive institution, the course selection at CDO is extensive. The school offers 17 Advanced Placement courses, among the widest variety available. CDO offers:

- Art History
- Biology
- Calculus AB & BC
- Chemistry
- Computer Science
- English Language & Composition
- English Literature & Composition
- French
- German
- Economics
- Music Theory
- Physics C: Mechanics
- Psychology
- Spanish Language
- Statistics
- Studio Art
- U.S. History
- U.S. Government & Politics
- World History

Over 90% of the school's graduates seek post-secondary education. Half (49.5%) of CDO faculty have attained a master's degree or a PhD. Canyon del Oro is under accreditation by the North Central Association.

CDO has graduated among the highest number of National Merit Scholars in Arizona. Scholars have been represented in every graduating class since the school's first class in 1968, with the exception of two years (2000 & 2002). In 2006 alone, the school had seven National Merit Finalists. The school has also had multiple Flinn Scholars.

Achievement rates on Advanced Placement exams, particularly in the laboratory sciences and mathematics, have historically far exceeded the national average. The school's journalism department has been recognized by the Interscholastic Press Association for its school newspaper, The Palantir, and the yearbook, Años de Oro. Since the school opened in the 1960s, CDO has also had a notable history in chess, with teams continually ranked nationally.

== Extracurricular activities ==
The extracurricular activities offered at CDO are numerous and varied. There are chapters of national organizations such as the National Honor Society and clubs founded by CDO students such as Science Explorer, in which students promote science through practical activities in the local community. Service organizations such as Key Club coexist alongside recreational clubs.

=== Athletics ===
The school competed in the Arizona Interscholastic Association (AIA) 5A Division for 25 years, during which it earned multiple regional and state championships across various sports.

Following the opening of a new high school and changes in district enrollment, the school now competes in the AIA 4A Sonoran Conference, Division I.

==== Athletic state titles ====
CDO teams and individuals have won over 90 State Championships, and placed as the State Runner-Up over 40 times. CDO has also had 9 athletes medal in boys' golf, most recently in 2011. In 2011 the boys' cross country team won the Division II state title over runner-up Ironwood Ridge. This was the first state championship for boys' cross country in school history.

In 1993, the school won Arizona's Tony Komadina Award for its girls' athletic program and received the Overall Excellence Award for the highest achieving athletic program in Arizona seven times. CDO has won more 4A and 5A state championships than all other schools in southern Arizona, with the exception of the oldest, Tucson High School (Arizona Interscholastic Association).

Below is a comprehensive table including all athletic state titles won by CDO teams. Canyon del Oro teams competed at the 3A equivalent level from fall 1966 to spring 1968, and the 4A equivalent level from fall 1968 to spring 1980. Between fall 1980 and spring 2005, CDO teams competed at the 5A level, resuming 4A competition from fall 2005 to 2009. The AIA reclassified class 4A-I as Division II in 2010.

Sport	State Champion
Baseball	2023, 2022, 2015, 2009, 2002, 2000, 1997, 1994, 1984, 1979
Boys' basketball	1978, 1977
Girls' basketball	2009, 1987
Boys' cross country	2011
Girls' cross country	
Football	2023, 2009, 1977, 1976
Boys' golf	2011, 2010, 1980, 1979, 1978, 1976, 1975, 1974, 1968
Girls' golf	
Boys' soccer	2010, 2009
Girls' soccer	1997
Softball	2017, 2012, 2011, 2009, 2008, 2007, 2005, 2001, 1992
Boys' swimming & dive	2018
Girls' swimming & dive	
Boys' tennis doubles	2001, 1985, 1980, 1977, 1975, 1974, 1973, 1969, 1968, 1967
Girls' tennis doubles	1980, 1979, 1978, 1977, 1976
Boys' tennis singles	1995, 1987, 1986, 1979, 1977, 1976, 1975, 1974, 1973, 1969, 1968
Girls' tennis singles	2011, 1995, 1994, 1987, 1980, 1978, 1977, 1976, 1975
Boys' tennis team	1986, 1980, 1977, 1976, 1975, 1974, 1973, 1972, 1969, 1968, 1967
Girls' tennis team	1980, 1979, 1978, 1977, 1976, 1975
Boys' track & field	
Girls' track & field	2011, 2006, 1980, 1976
Boys' volleyball	1996
Girls' volleyball	

=== Academics ===
==== Academic Decathlon ====
Canyon del Oro is home to one of the top performing Academic Decathlon teams in Arizona. The CDO team is a perennial powerhouse in the region, defeating other academically reputable schools in the area nearly every year. As of 2010, the team had captured nine consecutive region titles.

The CDO team placed 4th in the Arizona Academic Decathlon State Competition in 2002, 3rd in the state in 2003, State Runner-Up in 2004, and 3rd in the state in 2005. In 2006 the team became the Arizona Academic Decathlon State Champions, outscoring defending state champs Mesa Mountain View 46,482 points to 46,406 points. CDO represented Arizona in the National competition, placing 5th. In 2007, the team scored 45,667 points, placing second in the state behind Mesa Mountain View with 47,402 points. In 2008, the team scored 46,600 points, placing second in the state for the second consecutive year.

In 2009, CDO once again became the Arizona Academic Decathlon State Champions, outscoring Mesa Red Mountain 47,055.5 points to 44,052.2 points. The CDO team placed 4th in the U.S. Academic Decathlon National Competition, in representing Arizona, with 47,972.3 points. CDO placed behind Moorpark High School of California (51,289.5 points), Waukesha West High School of Wisconsin (50,979.9 points), and Burke High School of Nebraska (48,064.0 points).

==== Science Olympiad ====
CDO has an active Science Olympiad program, which has placed well in the state tournament in years past. This program is run by students and the AP Biology teacher, Dr. Zeiher. Other science teachers are becoming involved in the success of this program, notably Mrs. Christman of the chemistry department. Students create functioning robots and helicopters, as well as utilize high-tech protein modeling programs. In 2009, the team was Rookie of the Year at the state competition. The CDO team placed second in robotics during the state competition of 2011, but students aim to surpass this in years to come.

==== Academic Challenges ====
The Future Problem Solving Team won first place in the state competition in 2001.

== Notable alumni ==
=== Academia ===
- Andrew E. Masich, Author and President and CEO of an affiliate museum of the Smithsonian Institution
- Keith A. Nelson, Massachusetts Institute of Technology Professor of Chemistry
- Joseph Polchinski, University of California at Santa Barbara (high energy physics, string theory)

=== Arts and entertainment ===
- Jeff Biggers (1981), American Book Award-winning author, historian, journalist, novelist and playwright, author of the novel, Disturbing the Bones, with filmmaker Andrew Davis, and many other prize-winning books.
- Kyle Balda (1989), animator and film director, co-director of the animated films The Lorax, Minions, and Despicable Me 3, and director of the animated film Minions: The Rise of Gru
- Cord Jefferson (2000), film director and winner of the 2024 Academy Award for Best Adapted Screenplay for writing and directing American Fiction, a film also nominated for the Academy Award for Best Picture
- Brianne Leary (1975), actress and inventor, former host of The Disney Channel's Walt Disney World Inside Out and Animal Planet's Petsburgh USA
- Tom Zoellner (1987), author of Train: Riding the Rails that Created the Modern World, from the Trans-Siberian to the Southwest Chief

=== Journalism ===
- Masha Hamilton, (1974)journalist and novelist (Concern Worldwide, Associated Press)

=== Politics ===
- Jonathan Rothschild (1973), Mayor of Tucson, Arizona (2011-2019)
- Mark Udall (1968), U.S. Senator for Colorado (2009-2015); former U.S. Representative for District 2 of Colorado (1999-2009)

=== Sports ===
- Brian Anderson (2000), outfielder for the Kansas City Royals of Major League Baseball
- Callista Balko (2004), softball player (starting catcher) for the 2006 and 2007 University of Arizona NCAA Women's College World Series National Championship teams
- Ka'Deem Carey (2011), running back for the Calgary Stampeders of the Canadian Football League, running back for the University of Arizona (2011-2014); nominee for the Heisman Trophy (2013)
- Chris Duncan (1999), baseball player for the St. Louis Cardinals of Major League Baseball
- Shelley Duncan (1998), outfielder for the New York Yankees of Major League Baseball
- Scott Hairston (1999), outfielder for the Oakland Athletics of Major League Baseball
- Ryan Hietala (1992), professional golfer in the PGA, 1995 WAC Player of the Year
- Ed Hochuli (1969), Super Bowl referee official for the National Football League
- Ian Kinsler (2000), Israeli-American 4x All Star second baseman in Major League Baseball
- Blake Martinez (2012), inside linebacker for the New York Giants, of the National Football League
- Anthony Pedroza (1998), basketball player, member of the Mexico national team
- Colin Porter (1994), outfielder for the Houston Astros, St. Louis Cardinals, New York Yankees of Major League Baseball
- George Roop (2000), professional mixed martial artist, former cast member of SpikeTV's The Ultimate Fighter: Team Nogueira vs. Team Mir, former UFC fighter
- Pete Shufelt (1989), professional football linebacker
- Jason Stanford (1995), pitcher for the Cleveland Indians of Major League Baseball
- Jaide Stepter Baynes (2012), Track and field athlete
- Donny Toia (2010), Defender for Real Salt Lake, of Major League Soccer
- Turner Washington (2017), professional track & field athlete

=== Other ===
- Jodi Hildebrandt (1987), member of school's first state championship girls basketball team, counselor and YouTuber convicted of aggravated child abuse

== Attendance boundaries ==
The attendance boundaries of Canyon del Oro encompass segments of the communities of Oro Valley, Casas Adobes, and Catalina Foothills.

The northern boundary roughly follows the Cañada del Oro and East/West Lambert Lane. The eastern boundary is defined by Catalina State Park and the Coronado National Forest/Pusch Ridge Wilderness Area. The southern boundary is East/West Orange Grove Road from North Shannon Road east to North First Avenue. Between North First Avenue and the North Alvernon Road parallel, East Ina Road is the southern boundary (including the neighborhoods of Pima Canyon Estates and Cobblestone Estates). The western boundary is North Shannon Road.

=== Feeder schools ===
Elementary schools in the Canyon del Oro attendance area include Marion Donaldson, Winifred Harelson, Mesa Verde, and Copper Creek. L.W. Cross Middle School and Wilson K-8 Middle School feeding into Canyon del Oro.

== Enrollment history ==
Year	Enrollment
1965–66	283
1966–67	478
1967–68	560
1968–69	814
1969–70	896
1970–71	979
1971–72	991
1972–73	1,101
1973–74	1,266
1974–75	1,389
1975–76	1,464
1976–77	1,256
1977–78	1,333
1978–79	1,575
1979–80	1,652
1980–81	1,669
1981–82	1,698
1982–83	1,681
1983–84	1,791
1984–85	1,851
1985–86	1,990
1986–87	1,924
1987–88	2,089
1988–89	2,027
1989–90	1,971
1990–91	2,073
1991–92	2,267
1992–93	2,368
1993–94	2,452
1994–95	2,518
1995–96	2,527
1996–97	2,642
1997–98	2,809
1998–99	2,872
1999–00	2,988
2000–01	3,080
2001–02	2,446
2002–03	2,165
2003–04	1,865
2004–05	1,754
2005–06	1,700
2006–07	1,763
2007–08	1,826
2008–09	1,838

CDO opened in the fall of 1962 with a limited enrollment of only grade 7, and by 1965 the school had a high school enrollment of 283 students (specifically grades 9–10.) In its first year as a four-year high school with grades 9–12, CDO had an enrollment of 560 students. Enrollment gradually increased, exceeding 1,000 students in 1972, 2,000 students in 1987, and 3,000 students in the fall of 2000. The largest enrollment was 3,080 in 2000 (when CDO was the 6th largest high school in Arizona), and declined to 1,700 in 2005 due to the establishment of a new high school (Ironwood Ridge High School) in the fall of 2001. Due to open enrollment, CDO has sustained enrollment above 1,800 in recent years (Arizona Interscholastic Association).
