= Wilson K–8 School =

Wilson K-8 School may refer to:

- Woodrow Wilson Montessori School, Houston Independent School District - Houston, Texas
- Richard B. Wilson K-8 School, Amphitheater Public Schools - Oro Valley, Arizona
- Wilson High School, Long Beach CA
