= Amphi =

Amphi may refer to:

- Amphi Festival, a German music festival
- Amphitheater Public Schools
- Naphthalene substitution patterns, two substituents that occupy positions 2 and 6 either 3 and 7 on a naphthalene condensed rings
