= Oro Valley Country Club =

Country club in Pima County, Arizona

Coordinates: 32°23′23″N 110°58′27″W

- Interactive map of Oro Valley Country Club

Club information
- Location: Oro Valley, Arizona, U.S.
- Established: 1959
- Type: private
- Owner: club members
- Total holes: 18
- Tournaments: 2006 Pac-10 Women's Golf Championships, 2006 Girl's Junior America's Cup, qualifying rounds for the U.S. Open and the Arizona Open (FBR Open)
- Website: http://www.orovalleycountryclub.com/

Golf Course
- Designed by: Robert Bruce Harris (1959), Keith Foster (1987)
- Par: 72
- Length: 6,964 yards
- Course rating: 73.6

Oro Valley Country Club is a private country club in Oro Valley, Arizona, a suburb located 6 miles (9.7 km) north of Tucson. The club was founded in 1959 and designed by Robert Bruce Harris. Oro Valley Country Club is situated on the banks of the Cañada del Oro, at the base of Pusch Ridge in the Santa Catalina Mountains. The Town of Oro Valley, incorporated in 1974, takes its name from Oro Valley Country Club.

The club features an eighteen hole golf course, tennis courts, and a swimming pool. In late 2006 Oro Valley completed a substantial renovation on the club house facilities.

Most recently, in 2006 Oro Valley hosted the 20th Pacific-10 Conference Women's Golf Championships. UCLA finished first in the team results. Oro Valley hosted the first-ever Pac-10 Women's Golf Championships as well, in 1987. Oro Valley also hosted the 2008 Southwest Section PGA Championship.
