= Brianne Leary =

American actress (born 1957)

- Born: Brianne Banigan Leary; July 28, 1957 (age 69); Providence, Rhode Island, U.S.
- Education: Canyon del Oro High School
- Occupations: Actress, presenter, journalist, inventor
- Years active: 1978–present
- Known for: CHiPs; Baa Baa Black Sheep

Brianne Banigan Leary (born July 28, 1957) is an American actress best known for her role in the NBC series CHiPs as Officer Sindy Cahill in season two and as the host of Animal Planet's Petsburgh USA. Leary also invented a pet product called the PawPlunger.

== Family and career ==
Leary's mother was the Assistant City Editor for the Arizona Daily Star, and she is a cousin of writer Timothy Leary.

During high school at Canyon Del Oro in Tucson, Arizona, Leary was a gymnastics champion, finishing in the top three at the State Championship in 1974.

Leary first appeared on television as a contestant on Match Game '76. She won several games over the four episodes in which she appeared, earning a total of $9,050. She came back to the show three years later as a celebrity panelist, becoming the only person to appear on the 1970s incarnation as both a contestant and a panelist (1979 contestant Kirstie Alley came back to the re-booted show as a panelist in 2019).

Leary's first acting role came as nurse Susan Ames in the series Baa Baa Black Sheep, also known as Black Sheep Squadron (1977–1978). She later had a recurring role as Officer Sindy Cahill in the second season of CHiPs (1978–1979). Leary's first appearance on CHiPs was in the episode “Family Crisis” (S2Ep3). She also starred in various shows such as: Buck Rogers in the 25th Century; as slave girl Ryma The Fall Guy; Simon & Simon; No Soap, Radio; The Paper Chase as Russian gymnast Tania in and 1st & Ten. She also made an appearance in Battle of the Network Stars V in November 1978 and Battle of the Network Stars VI in May 1979. In 1982 she appeared as a guest star on The Love Boat episode "A Dress to Remember. (S5Ep28) She further appeared as Marjorie, love interest for Jack Sullivan, the widowed father of public defender Christine Sullivan, in Night Court, season 3, episode 3, 1985.

Leary created a Canadian animated children's TV show with Robin Steele called Stickin' Around that ran from 1996 until 1998. Steele had previously worked on MTV's Stick Figure Theatre.

In 1996, from the second season to the series finale, she was one of the co-hosts of Walt Disney World Inside Out alongside J.D. Roth and George Foreman.

In 1998-99, Leary also hosted Petsville USA, a television program about pets and animals that aired on Animal Planet. She briefly worked at WNYW Fox 5 in New York City and participated in the coverage of the 9/11 attacks.

In 2007, Leary received a patent for her "Paw Plunger", a "portable device for cleaning animal paws". The Paw Plunger makes it easier for pet owners to clean dirty/muddy pet paws.

== Partial filmography ==
- Baa Baa Black Sheep (1977–1978, TV Series) - Lt. Susan Ames
- CHiPs (1978–1979, TV Series) - Officer Sindy Cahill
- Off the Wall (1983) - Jenny
- Walt Disney World Inside Out (1996-1997) - Co-host
- Petsburgh USA (1998-1999) - Host
