= Ironwood Ridge High School =

Public high school in Pima County, Arizona, United States

Location
- 2475 West Naranja Drive; Oro Valley, Arizona 85742; United States; 32°24′34″N 111°1′15″W

Information
- Type: Public secondary (US)
- Established: 2001 (25 years ago)
- School district: Amphitheater Public Schools
- CEEB code: 030517
- Principal: Oranté Jenkins
- Staff: 67.30 (FTE)
- Grades: 9–12
- Enrollment: 1,562 (2023–2024)
- Student to teacher ratio: 23.21
- Campus size: 88.76 acres (35.92 ha)
- Campus type: Suburban
- Colors: Navy blue and silver
- Nickname: Nighthawks
- Newspaper: The Iron Quill
- Website: irhs.amphi.com

Ironwood Ridge High School is a public high school located in Oro Valley, Arizona, operated by Amphitheater Public Schools. It serves students in grades 9 through 12. The school's mascot is the nighthawk, and its colors are navy blue and silver. Ironwood Ridge opened in 2001 to address population growth in the district's northwest area. The school's name refers to the ironwood trees (the campus is also near Ironwood Forest National Monument) native to the region and its proximity to the Tortolita Mountains.

== History ==
=== Planning and establishment ===
Amphitheater Public Schools opened its first high school, Amphitheater High School, in 1939, followed by Canyon del Oro High School in 1962. In the 1980s and 1990s, population growth in Tucson’s northwest suburbs led to overcrowding, prompting the district to seek a site for a third high school. In 1994, the district purchased property near West Naranja Drive and North Shannon Road for the new school.

=== Environmental and legal challenges ===
During site preparation, construction was delayed due to environmental concerns regarding the endangered cactus ferruginous pygmy owl. The U.S. Fish and Wildlife Service listed the owl as endangered in 1997, and the Defenders of Wildlife organization filed for an injunction to halt construction under the Endangered Species Act. The United States Court of Appeals for the Ninth Circuit ultimately ruled in favor of the school district, allowing construction to proceed. Ironwood Ridge High School opened in August 2001, easing overcrowding at nearby Canyon del Oro High School.

== Governance ==
The school is part of the Amphitheater Public Schools district and is overseen by the district. The campus principal is Oranté Jenkins.

=== Feeder schools ===
Ironwood Ridge is fed by Richard B. Wilson K-8 School and Coronado K-8 School.

== Extracurricular activities ==
Ironwood Ridge offers extracurricular programs in athletics, music, and academic clubs. Its student newspaper is The Iron Quill.

=== Athletics ===
- The Wrestling team won the Arizona Interscholastic Association Division II state championships in 2011 and 2012.
- The girls' cross country team won the state titles in 2007 (5A Div. II), 2008 (5A Div. II), 2009 (5A Div. II).
- The girls' track and field team won the state championship in 2009 (5A Div. II), 2010 (5A Div. II).
- The boys' golf team won the 2008 (5A Div. II) state championship.
- The boys' basketball team won the 2008 state title.
- The boys' tennis team won state championships in (5A Div. II), 2009 (5A Div. II), 2012 (Div. II), 2013 (Div. II).

=== Music and performing arts ===
The school's marching band, known as the Nighthawk Vanguard, performs at home football games and regional competitions. The ensemble has appeared at several regional and national events, including:

- Blue Diamond Walnut Bowl, San Francisco, California
- Holiday Bowl Parade, San Diego, California
- Pearl Harbor Memorial Parade, Waikiki, Hawaii (2016)
- Gator Bowl, Gainesville, Florida
- NASCAR Cup Series Championship, Phoenix, Arizona
- WGI Western Regional, San Bernardino, California
- Washington, D.C. performances

=== Model United Nations ===
Ironwood Ridge High School sponsors a Model United Nations (MUN) program that participates in national-level conferences across the United States. The school established its own annual conference, which continues to be held each fall.

=== Other programs ===
Ironwood Ridge offers a culinary arts program.

== Awards and recognition ==
In 2007, Newsweek listed Ironwood Ridge among the top 5% of U.S. public schools, one of 12 Arizona schools included in that ranking.

== Notable alumni ==
- Alex Bowman - NASCAR Cup Series driver for Hendrick Motorsports (Class of 2011)
