= Walt Disney World Inside Out =

Television series

Walt Disney World Inside Out is an American television show that aired on the Disney Channel from 1994 to 1997. Initially airing monthly, it later became a weekly program, and featured footage of attractions at Walt Disney World in Orlando, Florida.

== Production ==
The show was originally hosted by comedian Scott Herriot. In 1995, J. D. Roth and Brianne Leary took over the hosting duties with George Foreman as the co-host. The pair's first episode featured a special encore presentation covering the opening weekend of the Disney Institute, as well as ESPN Wide World of Sports (formerly Disney's Wide World of Sports). It included interviews with Junior Brignac and Ben Wyatt, George Foreman interviewing the U.S. Junior Olympic gymnastics team, and a segment on the Hercules Zero to Hero parade.

The weekly format of Walt Disney World Inside Out underwent significant changes, including the introduction of a stage and studio audience. New segments included "Trivia Test Time," where Leary or an audience member posed questions about Walt Disney World Resort, with Roth and Leary providing answers; "George's Corner"; and "Disney Institute Update." The show also featured trivia segments before and after commercial breaks, performances by top artists, and during the "Summer Edition," a "Did You Know?" segment. Other additions included "WAY Inside Out," hosted by Talia Osteen, and "George's Mail Bag," where children read viewer questions and George Foreman responded. Some episodes were filmed at Disneyland Resort and titled Disneyland Inside Out.

== Episodes ==
=== Episode 1 (June 1994) ===
Scott visits Big Thunder Mountain Railroad, before meeting Hulk Hogan at Epcot's Morocco pavilion. He later previewed the Twilight Zone Tower of Terror at Disney-MGM Studios.

At Epcot, Scott plays a game at the interactive fountain, met the Splashtacular cast, and interviewed marine biologist Conrad Litz. A hidden camera segment features a tourist asking about watermelon shoes. The episode concludes with previews of upcoming attractions, including Mickey Mania, Innoventions, and two new Disney resorts.

=== Episode 2 (July 1994) ===
Scott embarks on a bear hunt at Disney’s Wilderness Lodge before heading to Pirates of the Caribbean for a game where guests memorize the theme song.

Next, he visits Fort Wilderness Resort & Campground, interviewing blacksmith Gary Wade, followed by a stop at Disney-MGM Studios to explore the Indiana Jones Epic Stunt Spectacular! and run from the giant boulder. At Epcot, Bill Nye introduces Innoventions, while Scott takes a quick look at The Lion King, receiving a drawing from animator Aaron Blaise.

Scott meets Nancy Kerrigan at Magic Kingdom, attempting to skate himself. The episode concludes at Pleasure Island, highlighting the Jazz Club and nightly New Year’s Eve countdown. Scott’s search for a bear ends when he spots Winnie the Pooh.

=== Episode 3 (August 1994) ===
Scott hosts this edition as a "hydrolysis expert" and guide. He starts at Disney-MGM Studios with Muppet*Vision 3D, where he interviews guests and meets Kermit the Frog.

Scott then plays tennis at Disney’s Grand Floridian Resort & Spa and discusses The Legend of the Lion King stage show at Magic Kingdom. Next, he heads to Bay Lake to host the Walt Disney World Inside Out Hydro-man Water Race.

He visits Disney’s All-Star Sports Resort, plays video games at Innoventions, and interviews guests at Typhoon Lagoon. Scott also checks out the Fantasy in the Sky fireworks at Magic Kingdom, with Bernie Durgin discussing the history of Disney’s fireworks. The episode concludes with previews of upcoming attractions: The Twilight Zone Tower of Terror, The Legend of the Lion King, and Innoventions.

=== Episode 4 (September 1994) ===
Scott takes viewers on a tour of World Showcase at Epcot '94, beginning with a trip to Disney-MGM Studios, where Scott rides Star Tours, interviewing guests and cast members.

Scott's World Showcase adventure begins in Germany, followed by a segment on the Magic Kingdom parade Mickey Mania. Scott visits Japan before moving to Discovery Island for a tour with Kim Murphy, highlighting the island’s wildlife.

Howie Mandel interviews guests on the Backlot Studio Tour, while Scott continues to Mexico. At Disney’s Port Orleans Resort, Scott interviews Denny Zavett and later heads to Innoventions to chat with guests. Scott’s final stop is the United Kingdom, where he interviews cast members before wrapping up with a preview of upcoming events, including Mickey's Very Merry Christmas Parade.

=== Episode 5 (October 1994) ===
The episode begins with Gilbert Gottfried attempting to solve the mystery of The Twilight Zone Tower of Terror. At the Magic Kingdom, Scott asks guests about their Halloween costumes, before heading to Disney-MGM Studios' costume department. After getting transformed into a werewolf, Scott asks Disney villains to turn him back but was turned into a monkey.

Scott visits Pleasure Island's improv theater, checks out the Never Land Club at Disney's Polynesian Resort, and rides Maelstrom at Epcot '94. He later explores Innoventions and tests the Aladdin's Magic Carpet virtual reality attraction at Walt Disney Imagineering Labs. Back at the Magic Kingdom, he takes a spin on The Haunted Mansion.

The episode concludes with previews of upcoming events, including Mickey's Very Merry Christmas Party and the opening of Planet Hollywood at Pleasure Island.

=== Episode 6 (November 1994) ===
This episode explores transportation across all three Walt Disney World theme parks. Featured segments include Magic Kingdom's Splash Mountain, the monorails, the Hoop-de-doo Musical Revue dinner show, the Seven Seas Lagoon Ferry at Epcot, animatronics, and a visit to Victoria & Albert's restaurant. The episode concludes with previews of upcoming events, including New Year's Eve at Pleasure Island, the opening of the new Tomorrowland, and Mickey's Very Merry Christmas Party. Scott and Goofy sign off together.

=== Episode 7 (December 1994) ===
Scott celebrates Christmas at Walt Disney World. The episode features Kathie Lee Gifford performing "Winter Wonderland" and hosting the Kooky-Cookie Guest Game.

Scott previews upcoming events: the openings of Tomorrowland, Planet Hollywood, and Disney's All-Star Music Resort, the Walt Disney World Fitness Fest, Twilight Zone Tower of Terror's Friday the 13th event, and the LPGA tournament at Eagle Pines.

=== Episode 8 (January 1995) ===
Scott explores the new Tomorrowland and Extraterrorestrial Alien Encounter before attempting water skiing at Disney's Polynesian Resort. He then visits Epcot '95 to see manatees at The Living Seas with Kim Murphy before visiting Honey, I Shrunk the Audience!. He attends the opening of Planet Hollywood at Pleasure Island, conducting interviews with celebrity guests.

At the Magic Kingdom, Scott enjoys a performance by Tag Team and relaxes at Disney's All-Star Music Resort. The episode concludes with previews of upcoming events, including Disney Village Marketplace’s 20th anniversary celebration, the debut of Circle of Life, and celebrations for the Chinese New Year and Mardi Gras.

=== Episode 9 (February 1995) ===
Scott explores Mickey’s Starland in the Magic Kingdom, searching for Mickey and Minnie Mouse. Scott then seeks gift ideas at the France pavilion in Epcot '95.

He visits the Walt Disney World horticulture department, takes a look at Beauty & The Beast Live On Stage, and works out at Disney's Yacht Club Resort. Scott also explores a real Disney fairy tale wedding and interviews guests at the Coral Reef Restaurant. He later interviews Joan Collins, attending her book signing at Disney MGM Studios. As he prepares for his date with a secret admirer, Scott reviews upcoming events, including Bryant Gumbel’s celebrity tournament, St. Patrick’s Day at Pleasure Island, Galaxy Search at Tomorrowland, Kids Day at World Showcase, and Graduation Night for high school seniors. The episode concludes with Scott discovering his “secret admirer” is the evil queen from Snow White.

=== Episode 10 (March 1995) ===
Scott attends a pirate treasure hunt, encountering Captain Hook. He then visits Space Mountain, interviewing its production designer, Steve Brooks.

Scott explores Disney's Village Marketplace for the treasure hunt but is unsuccessful. He goes to Epcot’s Chinese pavilion and scuba dives with marine biologist Brian Dorn, successfully feeding harmless sharks at Shark Reef in Disney's Typhoon Lagoon. He visits Main Street, U.S.A.'s Chapeau before heading to Epcot’s Circle of Life: An Environmental Fable.

Scott concludes the episode with a visit to Disney's Grand Floridian Resort & Spa for brunch with characters before meeting with Kevin Nealon at Disney's Hollywood Studios.

=== Episode 11 (April 1995) ===
Bill Fagerbakke joins Scott as he explores behind the scenes with Disney’s cast members.

=== Episode 12 (May 1995) ===
Scott explores various restaurants and eateries across Walt Disney World. The episode also includes a guest game involving the attraction Dumbo the Flying Elephant. This episode marked the end of the show’s original monthly format and Scott Herriot’s final episode as host.
