= La Cholla Airpark =

Airport in Pima County, Arizona

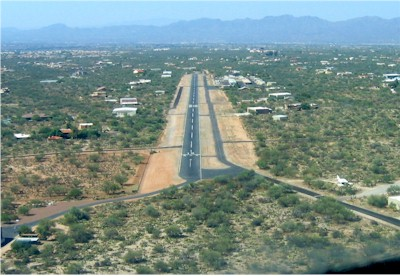
- IATA: none; ICAO: none; FAA LID: 57AZ

Summary
- Airport type: Private
- Owner: La Cholla Airpark, Inc.
- Serves: Tucson, Arizona
- Location: Oro Valley, Arizona
- Elevation AMSL: 2,940 ft / 896 m
- Coordinates: 32°26′48″N 111°00′10″W
- Website: www.LaChollaAirpark.com

Map

Runways
Direction	Length		Surface
Direction	ft	m	Surface
1/19	4,500	1,372	Asphalt

Helipads
Number	Length		Surface
Number	ft	m	Surface
HI	44	13	Asphalt

Statistics (2009)
- Aircraft operations: 4,000
- Based aircraft: 95
- Source: Federal Aviation Administration

La Cholla Airpark (FAA LID: 57AZ) is a private airpark located in Oro Valley, Pima County, Arizona, United States, 8 miles (7.0 nmi; 13 km) northwest of the central business district of Tucson. La Cholla Airpark was founded in 1972 and includes 122 homes and buildable lots in the foothills of the Tortolita Mountains. A 4,500 foot air strip is situated at the center of the community.

Transient aircraft are permitted to utilize La Cholla Airpark and prior permission is required. Insurance and flight information must be forwarded (by fax) to the airpark prior to arrival. La Cholla Airpark supports a website to serve airpark homeowners and transient aircraft.

== Facilities and aircraft ==
La Cholla Airpark has two landing sites:

- Runway 1/19 measuring 4,500 ft × 44 ft (1,372 m × 13 m) asphalt
- Helipad measuring 44 ft × 44 ft (13 m × 13 m)

For the 12-month period ending December 31, 1999, the airport had 4,000 aircraft operations, an average of 10 per day, all of which were general aviation. As of January 15, 2009, 95 aircraft based at this airport: 95% single engine, 3% multi-engine and 2% helicopters.

== See also ==
- List of airports in Arizona
