= Oro Valley, Arizona =

Town in Pima County, Arizona

- Town
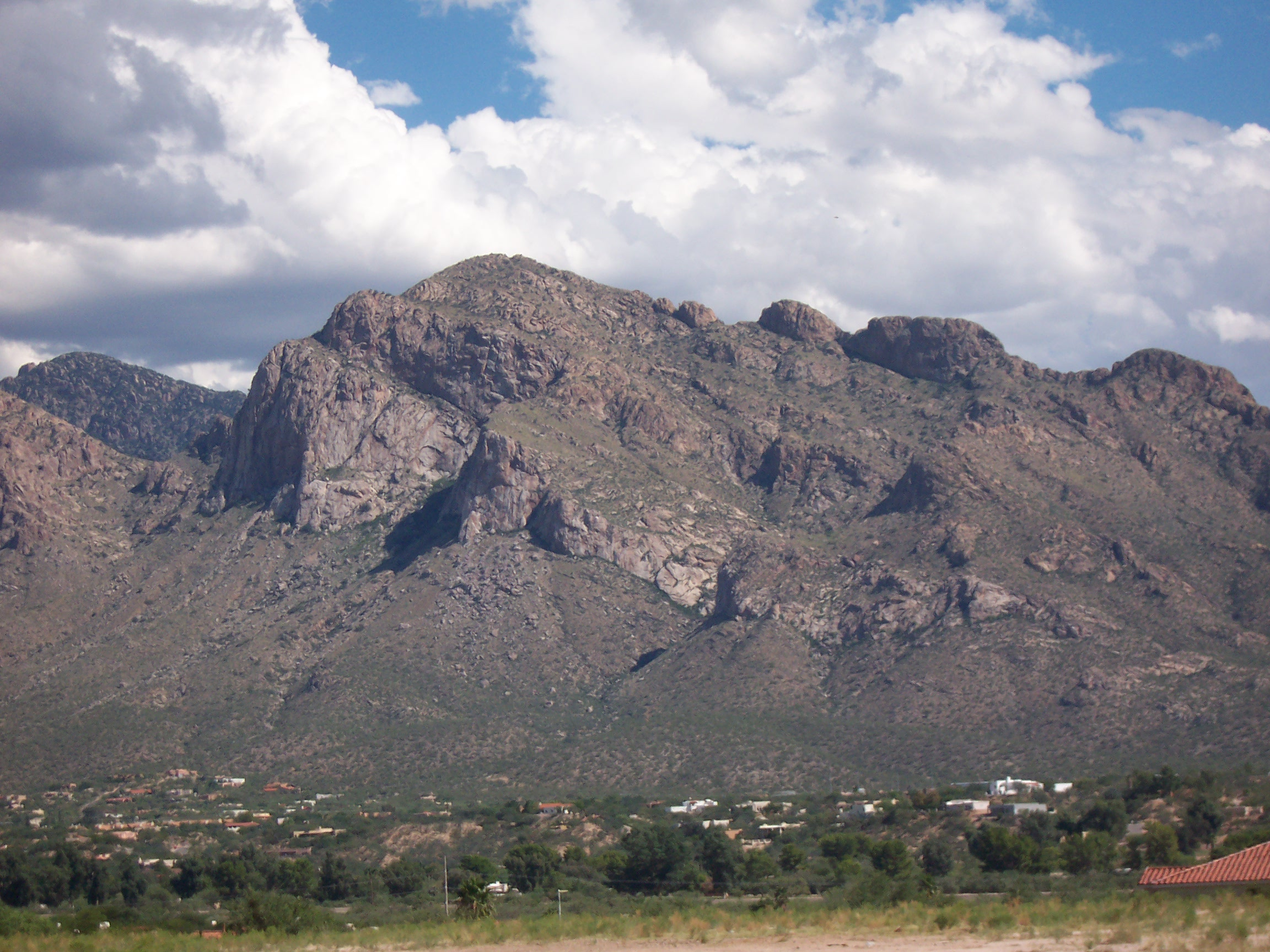
- View of Pusch Ridge in the Santa Catalina Mountains from Oro Valley, September 2004

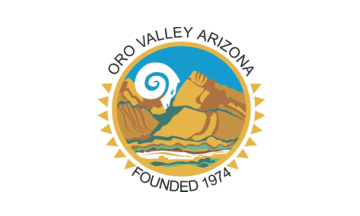
- Flag Seal
- Nickname: The OV
- Interactive map outlining Oro Valley
- Location in Arizona Location in the United States
- Coordinates: 32°25′16″N 110°58′34″W
- Country: United States
- State: Arizona
- County: Pima
- Founded: 1974
- Incorporated: 1974

Government
  - Type: Council-manager
  - Body: Oro Valley Town Council
  - Mayor: Joe Winfield
  - Vice Mayor: Melanie Barrett
  - Town Manager: Jeff Wilkins
  - Town Council: List: • Melanie Barrett; • Mary Murphy; • Harry Greene II; • Joyce Jones-Ivey; • Elizabeth Robb; • Josh Nicolson; • Joe Winfield

Area
  - Total: 34.99 sq mi (90.63 km^{2})
  - Land: 34.87 sq mi (90.32 km^{2})
  - Water: 0.12 sq mi (0.30 km^{2})
- Elevation: 2,620.0 ft (798.57 m)

Population (2020)
  - Total: 47,070
  - Density: 1,349.7/sq mi (521.13/km^{2})
- Time zone: UTC-7 (MST (no DST))
- ZIP codes: 85704, 85737, 85742, 85755
- Area code: 520
- FIPS code: 04-51600
- GNIS feature ID: 37458
- Website: www.orovalleyaz.gov

Oro Valley, incorporated in 1974, is a suburban town located 6 miles (9.7 km) north of Tucson, Arizona, United States, in Pima County. According to the 2020 census, the population of the town is 47,070, an increase from 29,700 in 2000. Dubbed the "Upscale Tech Mecca" of Southern Arizona by the Arizona Daily Star, Oro Valley is home to over 10 high tech firms and has a median household income nearly 50% higher than the U.S. median. The town is located approximately 110 miles (180 km) southeast of Phoenix, the state capital.

Oro Valley is situated in the western foothills of the Santa Catalina Mountains at the base of Pusch Ridge. The Tortolita Mountains are located north of the town and vistas of the Tucson valley are to the south. The town occupies the middle Cañada del Oro Valley. Oro Valley hosts a large number of residents from around the US who maintain second or winter homes in the town.

The town hosted the 2006 Pac-10 Women's Golf Championships at the Oro Valley Country Club which was also the site for the 2006 Girls' Junior America's Cup, a major amateur golf tournament for the Western United States. Annual events in Oro Valley include the Oro Valley Festival of the Arts, El Tour de Tucson, the Oro Valley Music Festival, the Tucson Marathon, the Cactus Speed Classic for inline skaters, the Oro Valley Triathlon, and the Arizona Distance Classic.

== History ==
=== Pre-American period ===
The area of Oro Valley has been inhabited discontinuously for nearly two thousand years by various groups of people. The Hohokam lived in the Honeybee Village in the foothills of the Tortolita Mountains on Oro Valley's far north side around AD 450 and continuously inhabited the village for nearly 800 years. Hohokam artifacts continue to be discovered in the Honeybee Village and studied by archaeologists around the globe.

Early in the 16th century, Native American tribes, including the Apache, arrived in the Southern Arizona area, including Oro Valley. These tribes inhabited the region only a few decades prior to the arrival of Spanish conquistadors like Francisco Coronado. In the beginning of the late 16th century, the Spanish established forts in the area, including the Tucson Presidio in 1775.

=== Territorial period ===
Beginning in the 19th century after the Mexican–American War and subsequent Gadsden Purchase, Americans increasingly settled in the Arizona Territory. Following the Civil War and several Army efforts to pacify the Apaches, settlers ventured north from Tucson to settle Oro Valley. In 1869, Francisco Romero, who was from a Hispanic family tracing its Tucson roots to the early nineteenth century, established a ranch in the present-day Catalina State Park. He constructed ranch buildings on the foundations of Hohokam ruins in the park. Romero lived there intermittently from 1869 to his death in 1905. Members of the Romero family occupied land in that same area until 1930.

In 1874, George Pusch, a German immigrant, established a cattle ranch in Oro Valley that was unique for utilizing a steam pump to provide water, eventually popularizing Pusch's property as the Steam Pump Ranch. The steam pump was one of only two in the Arizona Territory. Pusch and his family visited frequently and employed caretakers to manage the property but never lived there. George Pusch and later the Pusch Land and Cattle Company owned Steam Pump Ranch until 1925. Pusch's ranch provided respite for settlers and travelers entering and leaving the Tucson area. Pusch Ridge is named in honor of George Pusch.

Ranching continued to flourish in the area as greater numbers of Americans settled in Arizona during its days as a territory and following statehood. Federal homesteads became available after 1903 when land surveys were completed. Homesteads were claimed by individuals from 1903 until the 1940s. Hispanic homesteaders included Francisco Romero, Jesus Elias, Francisco Marin, Francisco Aragon and others. Female homesteaders included Ina Gittings, Mabel Burke Johnson, Margaret Moodie and others. Other prominent homesteaders included William Sutherland, James Reidy and David Morgan.

Starting in the 1930s up until the 1960s, large ranching families came to Oro Valley with many coming from the Midwest and the East. After vacationing in Tucson, they became interested in living in the desert and purchased many of the homesteads occupied by early settlers. These wealthy ranchers obtained properties of 1,000 to 7,000 acres. They usually lived on the ranches in the winter months and employed caretakers to manage the property and cattle. These wealthy ranchers included Walter McDonald, John Procter, Lawrence Rooney, Joseph McAdams and Lloyd and Betty Golder.

Gold prospectors in the American West were attracted to Southern Arizona where gold was said to be in abundance in and around the Santa Catalina Mountains to the north of Tucson. Fueled by the legend of the lost Iron Door Gold Mine in the mountains, those in search of gold trekked through the Oro Valley area, focusing their attention along the Cañada del Oro. No significant amounts of gold were found locally.

=== Post-World War II period ===
After World War II, the Tucson area experienced dramatic population growth, impacting Oro Valley as well. Property owners began subdividing local real estate for development in the early 1930s. Construction of Campo Bello, the first suburban development, began in 1948. Lots in the Linda Vista Citrus Tracts were sold from the late 1930s to the 1960s and occupied by residents. In the early 1950s, the Oro Valley Country Club opened at the base of Pusch Ridge, affirming the area's future as an affluent community. The Suffolk Hills development was constructed from 1960 to 1962. Although one tract housing development was built in the area in the early 1950s, the majority of homes in the Oro Valley area were built by individual land owners on large lots in a low density residential style.

=== Town founding ===
The community continued to grow gradually, and area residents increasingly desired local control of the land in the area. In the late 1960s, incorporation became a greater focus in Oro Valley. Tucson Mayor James M. Corbett Jr. expressed great interest in expanding the Tucson city limits to the far north side of Pima County. Corbett vowed to bring the Oro Valley area into Tucson "kicking and screaming", alluding to the reservations Oro Valley residents expressed about joining Tucson.

In 1968, a petition to incorporate Oro Valley began circulating. The Pima County Board of Supervisors officially refused to allow Oro Valley to incorporate, and litigation followed. Ultimately, the Arizona Supreme Court ruled in favor of incorporation. In 1974, the Town of Oro Valley was incorporated with only 2.4 square miles (6.2 km^{2}). The original town limits included the Linda Vista Citrus Tracts, Campo Bello Estates, Shadow Mountain Estates, and Oro Valley Country Club Estates. Activity in Oro Valley centered primarily around the Oro Valley Country Club and Canyon del Oro High School. Originally named Palo Verde, town founders proceeded with incorporation efforts under the official name of Oro Valley to garner support from the influential residents of the Oro Valley Country Club. The town began with a population of nearly 1,200.

Through the 1980s and particularly in the 1990s, Oro Valley experienced significant residential and commercial growth. In 1990, the town had a population of 6,670. By 2000, that figure had increased to 29,700 residents. During that time, residential communities of all housing-unit densities were developed in the town, including several master-planned communities. For several years in the 1990s, Oro Valley was the fastest growing municipality in Arizona.

== Geography ==
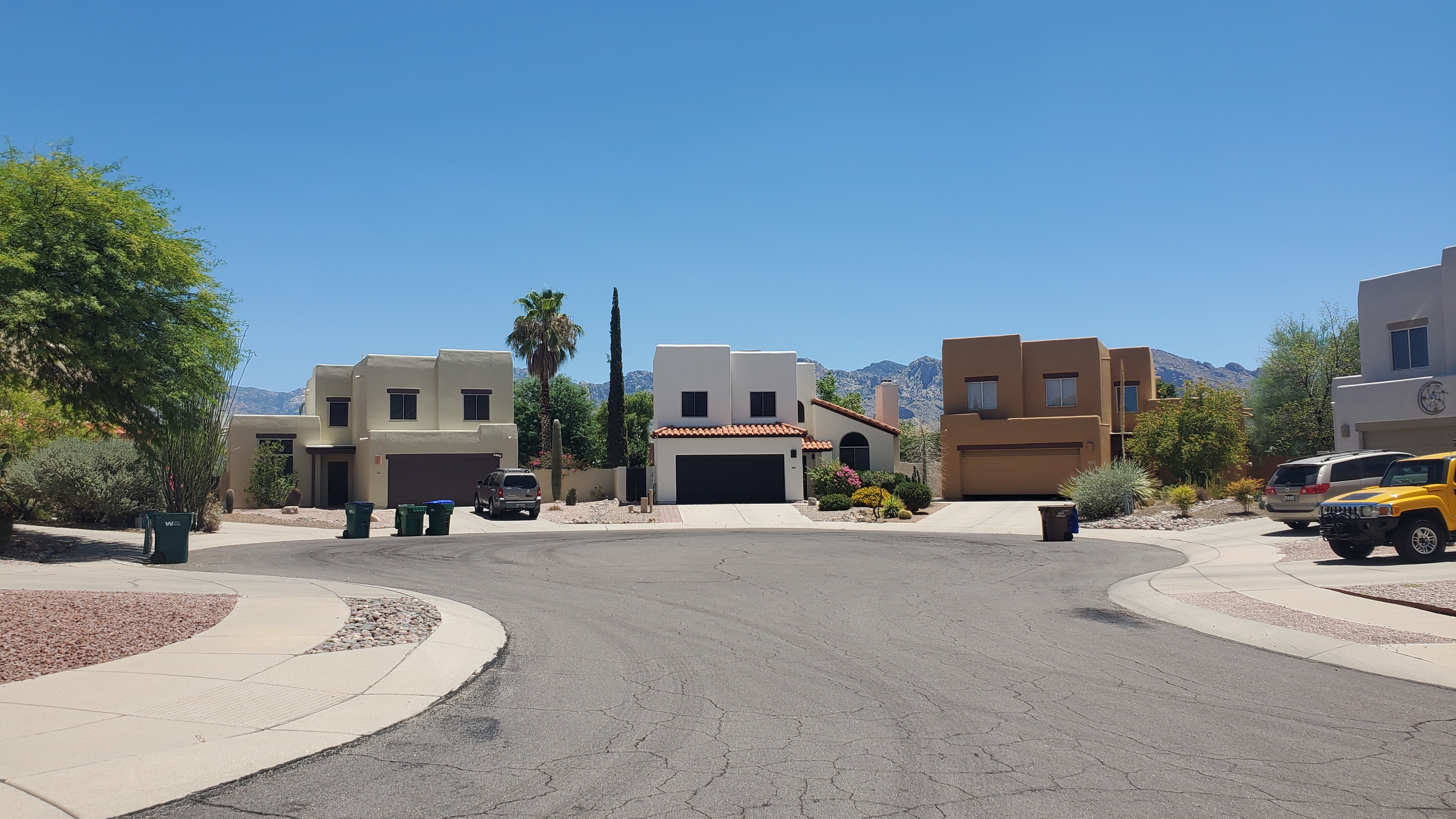
Houses in a cul-de-sac in Oro Valley in August 2023

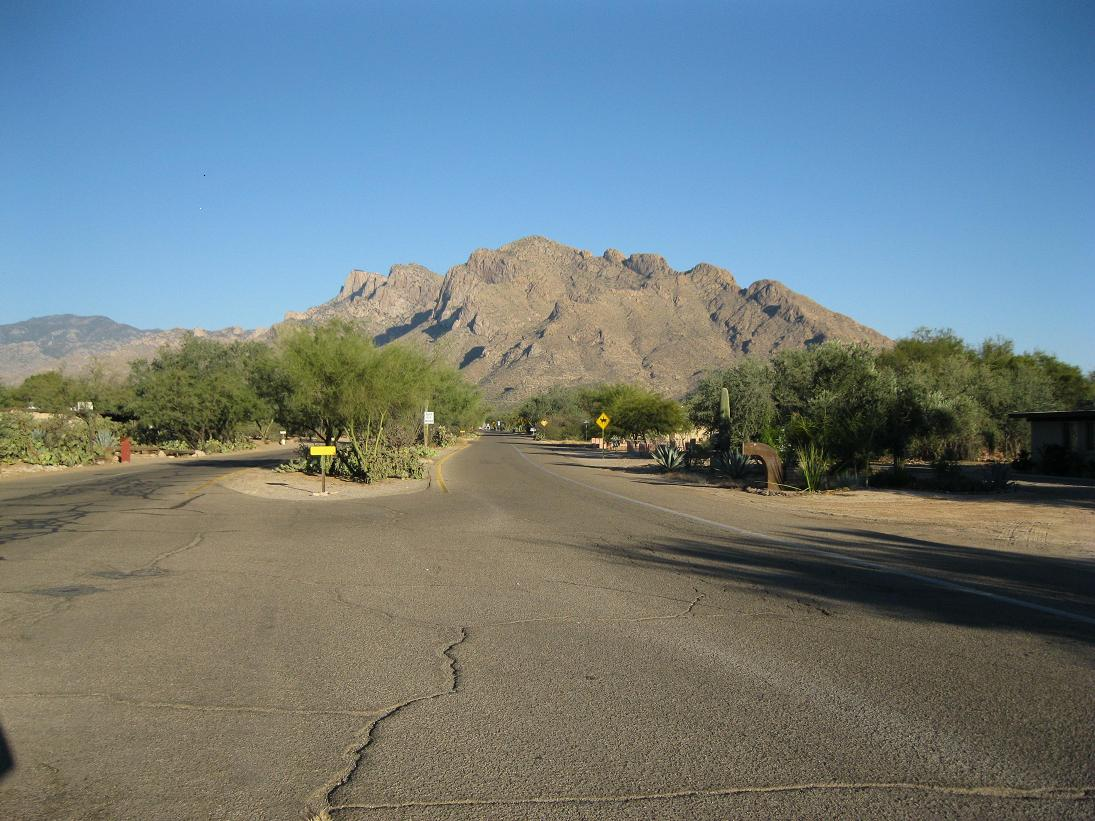
View towards Pusch Ridge from Calle Concordia

Oro Valley is located at 32°25′N 110°59′W (32.4212, −110.9760) in the middle of the Cañada del Oro Valley. Oro Valley sits at an average elevation of 2,620 feet (800 m) above sea level.

According to the United States Census Bureau, the town has a total area of 31.9 square miles (83 km^{2}), of which 31.8 square miles (82 km^{2}) is land and 0.1 square miles (0.26 km^{2}) (0.31%) is water.

The topography of Oro Valley is distinguished by the Cañada del Oro riverbed bisecting the town. The eastern banks of the Cañada del Oro rise dramatically to the Santa Catalina Mountains. The western banks of the Cañada del Oro rise more gradually to a plateau and the foothills of the Tortolita Mountains farther north.

Notable geographic features include Pusch Ridge (peak elevation: 5,366 ft.), Pusch Ridge Wilderness Area, Santa Catalina Mountains (peak elevation: 9,157 ft.), Cañada del Oro, and Tortolita Mountains (peak elevation: 4,696 ft.).

=== Parks ===
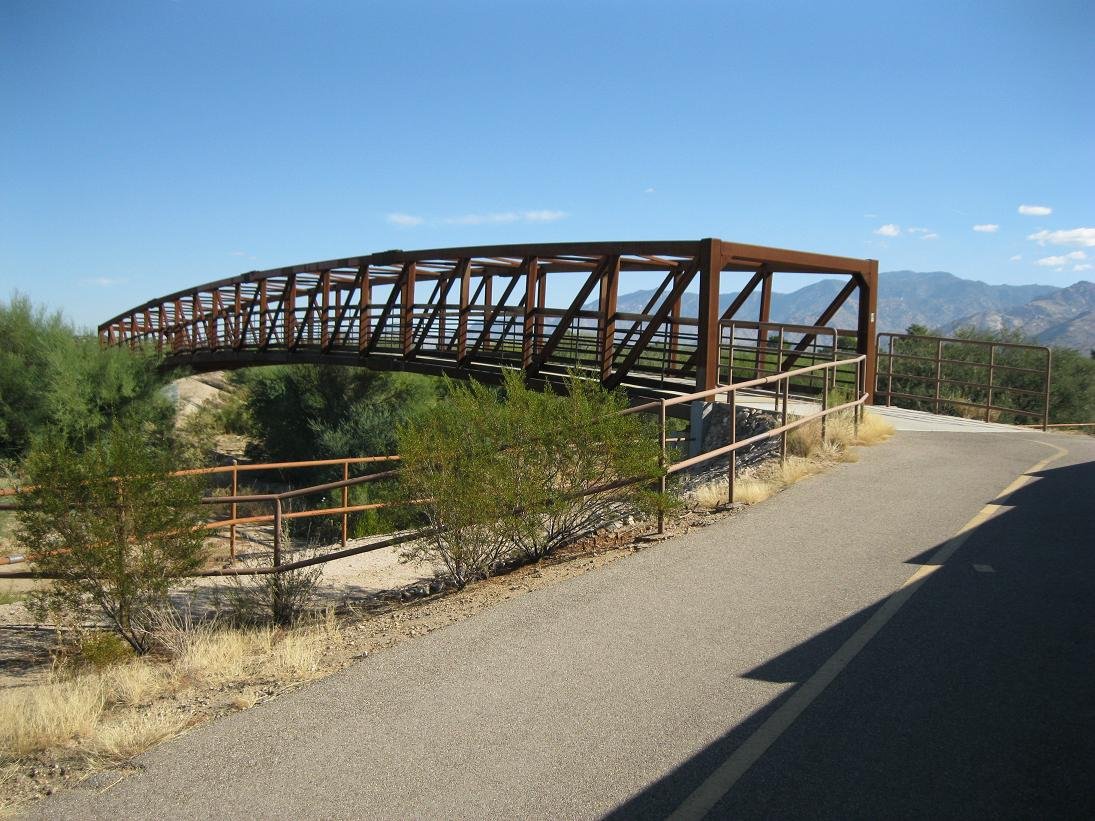
Footbridge along the Cañada del Oro Trail

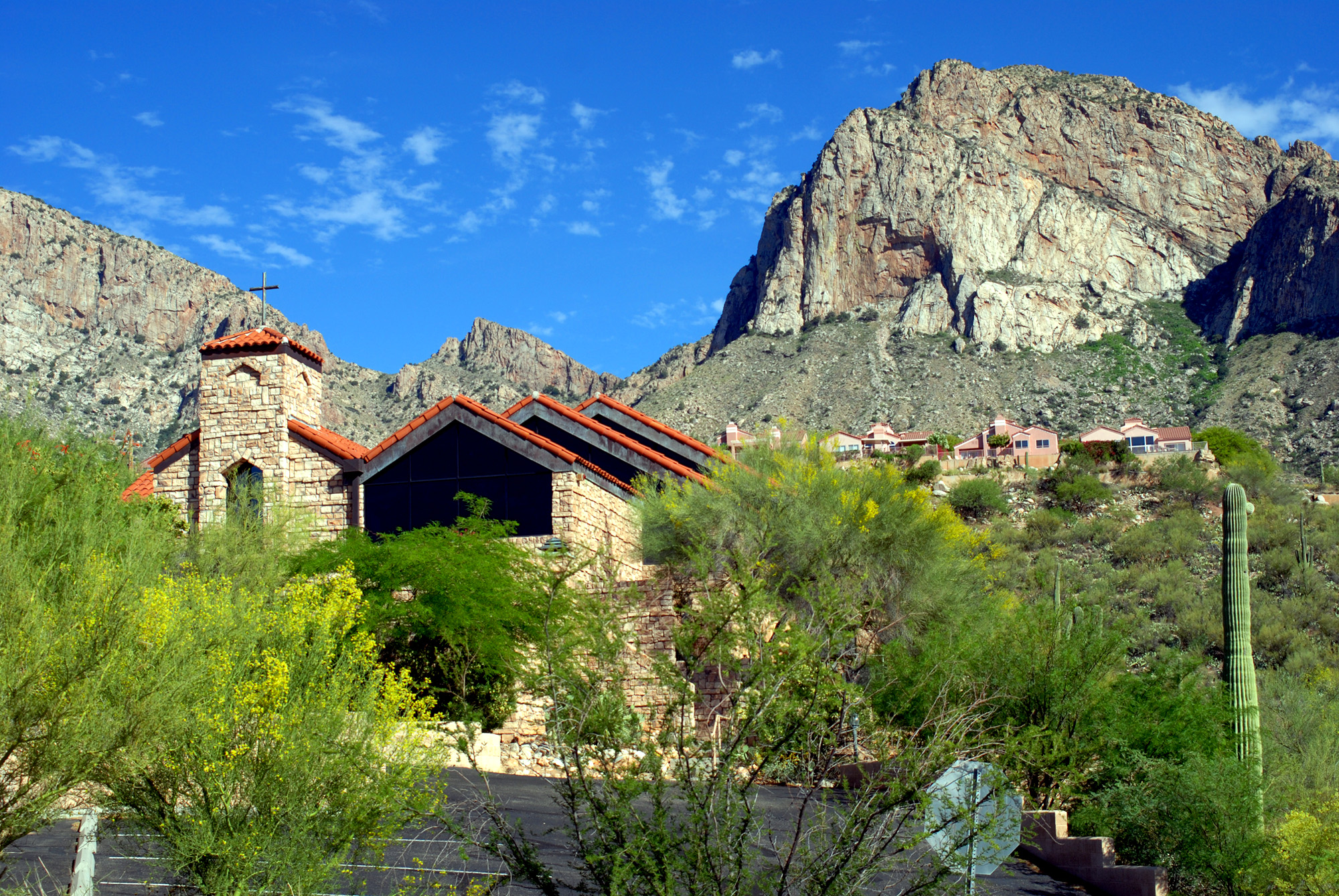
Oro Valley United Church with Pusch Ridge in the background

The oldest park in Oro Valley is James D. Kriegh Park (formerly Dennis Weaver Park); the park includes an Olympic-sized swimming pool, recreational fields, and racquetball courts. Other major parks in Oro Valley include Cañada del Oro Riverfront Park, which features tennis and basketball courts, recreational fields, walking trails, and connections to equestrian trails along the Cañada del Oro wash, and West Lambert Lane Park, a nature park with a number of hiking trails in Cañada Hills.

Naranja Park is the largest park with 213 acres in the middle of town. The park contains four multi-sport fields, a playground, a dog park, an archery range, and multiple walking trails. It is also home to the Sonoran Desert Flyers, an organization dedicated to radio control model aircraft. The park recently underwent a $25 million expansion that added four new multi-sport fields, six pickleball courts, two basketball courts, a splash pad, a BMX track, and a skate park.

Catalina State Park and the Coronado National Forest in the Santa Catalina Mountains form the eastern boundary of Oro Valley. Linda Vista Trail, located east of Oracle Road on Linda Vista Drive to the south of 1st Avenue, is a nature trail that provides views of Oro Valley, Pusch Ridge, and the surrounding vicinity. Honeybee Village and Steam Pump Ranch are historical park sites in Oro Valley that are managed and maintained by the Oro Valley Historical Society in cooperation with the governments of Oro Valley and Pima County.

Northwestern Oro Valley also includes La Cholla Airpark, a private airport community founded in 1972. The airpark includes nearly 100 residential estates and a 4,500-foot (1,400 m) air strip situated at the center of the community for member use.

== Climate ==
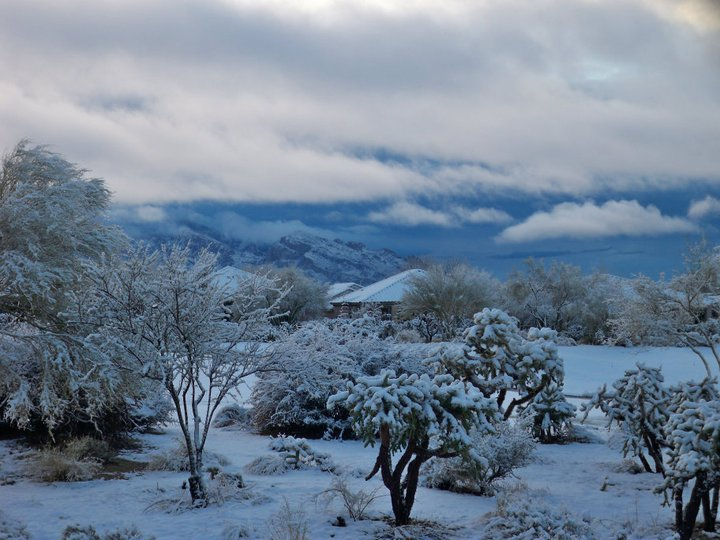
Oro Valley snowfall in 2011. The Santa Catalina Mountains are in the background.

Oro Valley has similar weather conditions to Tucson due to their geographic proximity. Oro Valley sees slightly less rain throughout the year due to being west of the Santa Catalina Mountains and most of Tucson being to the south or southwest of the mountains. The average year round temperature of Oro Valley is slightly cooler than Tucson due to the higher elevation. Wind tends to flow in a north to northwesterly direction while the sun rises later than Tucson due to the Santa Catalina Mountains.

Climate data for Oro Valley, AZ
Month	Jan	Feb	Mar	Apr	May	Jun	Jul	Aug	Sep	Oct	Nov	Dec	Year
Source: NOAA

== Demographics ==
Historical population
Census	Pop.	Note	%±
1970	581		—
1980	1,489		156.3%
1990	6,670		348.0%
2000	29,700		345.3%
2010	41,011		38.1%
2020	47,070		14.8%
2022 (est.)	48,226	▲	2.5%
U.S. Decennial Census

=== Racial and ethnic composition ===
Oro Valley town, Arizona – Racial composition Note: the US Census treats Hispanic/Latino as an ethnic category. This table excludes Latinos from the racial categories and assigns them to a separate category. Hispanics/Latinos may be of any race.
Race (NH = Non-Hispanic)	2020	2010	2000	1990	1980
White alone (NH)	76.1% (35,803)	81.9% (33,605)	88.2% (26,182)	91.6% (6,110)	93.8% (1,396)
Black alone (NH)	1.5% (716)	1.4% (559)	1% (303)	0.5% (36)	0.1% (1)
American Indian alone (NH)	0.3% (130)	0.3% (125)	0.3% (89)	0.3% (20)	0.7% (11)
Asian alone (NH)	4.2% (1,993)	3.1% (1,263)	1.9% (552)	1% (65)	
Pacific Islander alone (NH)	0.1% (53)	0.1% (53)	0.1% (33)		
Other race alone (NH)	0.4% (185)	0.1% (51)	0.1% (20)	0.1% (8)	
Multiracial (NH)	3.7% (1,746)	1.5% (624)	1% (303)	—	—
Hispanic/Latino (any race)	13.7% (6,444)	11.5% (4,731)	7.5% (2,218)	6.5% (431)	5.4% (81)

=== 2020 census ===
As of the 2020 census, Oro Valley had a population of 47,070. The town's population increased by 14.7% between 2010 and 2020. The median age was 55.4 years. 16.5% of residents were under the age of 18 and 35.3% of residents were 65 years of age or older. For every 100 females there were 90.4 males, and for every 100 females age 18 and over there were 87.8 males age 18 and over.

96.3% of residents lived in urban areas, while 3.7% lived in rural areas.

There were 20,791 households in Oro Valley, of which 21.2% had children under the age of 18 living in them. Of all households, 58.9% were married-couple households, 12.7% were households with a male householder and no spouse or partner present, and 23.6% were households with a female householder and no spouse or partner present. About 26.4% of all households were made up of individuals and 16.1% had someone living alone who was 65 years of age or older.

There were 23,303 housing units, of which 10.8% were vacant. The homeowner vacancy rate was 1.8% and the rental vacancy rate was 10.8%.

=== Income and poverty ===
The median income for the town's households was $92,540. The town had a per capita income of $53,411 with 6.7% of the population below the poverty line.

The median income for the town's households was $68,784. The town had a per capita income of $39,397 with 5.3% of the population below the poverty line.

According to a 2007 estimate, the median income for the town's households was $74,015, and the median income for a family was $80,807. Males had a median income of $55,522 versus $31,517 for females. The town's per capita income was $31,134 while 3.1% of the population and 2.4% of families were below the poverty line. Of those under the age of 18, 2.0% were living below the poverty line while 2.2% of those 65 and older were living below the poverty line.

=== 2010 census ===
During the 2010 census, there were 41,011 people and 17,364 households in Oro Valley. The population density was 1,154.4 people per square mile. There were 20,340 housing units in Oro Valley. The racial makeup of the town was 81.9% non-Hispanic White, 1.5% Black or African American, 0.4% Native American, 3.1% Asian, 0.1% Pacific Islander, and 2.4% from two or more races while 11.5% of the population were Hispanic or Latino of any race.

The town's population was spread out with 3.9% under the age of 5, 19.2% from the age of 5 to 17, 50.8% from the age of 18 to 64, and 26.1% who were 65 years of age or older. The median age was 50 years with 47% male and 53% female.

=== 2000 census ===
During the 2000 census, there were 29,700 people, 12,249 households, and 9,382 families residing in the town. The population density was 933.1 inhabitants per square mile (360.3/km^{2}). There were 13,946 housing units at an average density of 438.2 per square mile (169.2/km^{2}). The town's racial makeup was 93.1% White, 1.1% Black or African American, 0.4% Native American, 1.9% Asian, 0.1% Pacific Islander, 1.8% from other races, and 1.6% from two or more races while 7.5% of the population were Hispanic or Latino of any race.

There were 12,249 households out of which 27.0% had children under the age of 18 living with them, 69.8% were married couples living together, 4.9% had a female householder with no husband present, and 23.4% were non-families. Of all households, 19.4% were made up of individuals and 8.2% had someone living alone who was 65 years of age or older. The average household size was 2.41 and the average family size was 2.76.

The town's population was spread out with 21.5% under the age of 18, 4.5% from the age of 18 to 24, 23.5% from the age of 25 to 44, 27.7% from the age of 45 to 64, and 22.7% who were 65 years of age or older. The median age was 45 years. For every 100 females, there were 94.4 males. For every 100 females aged 18 and over, there were 91.0 males.

== Economy ==
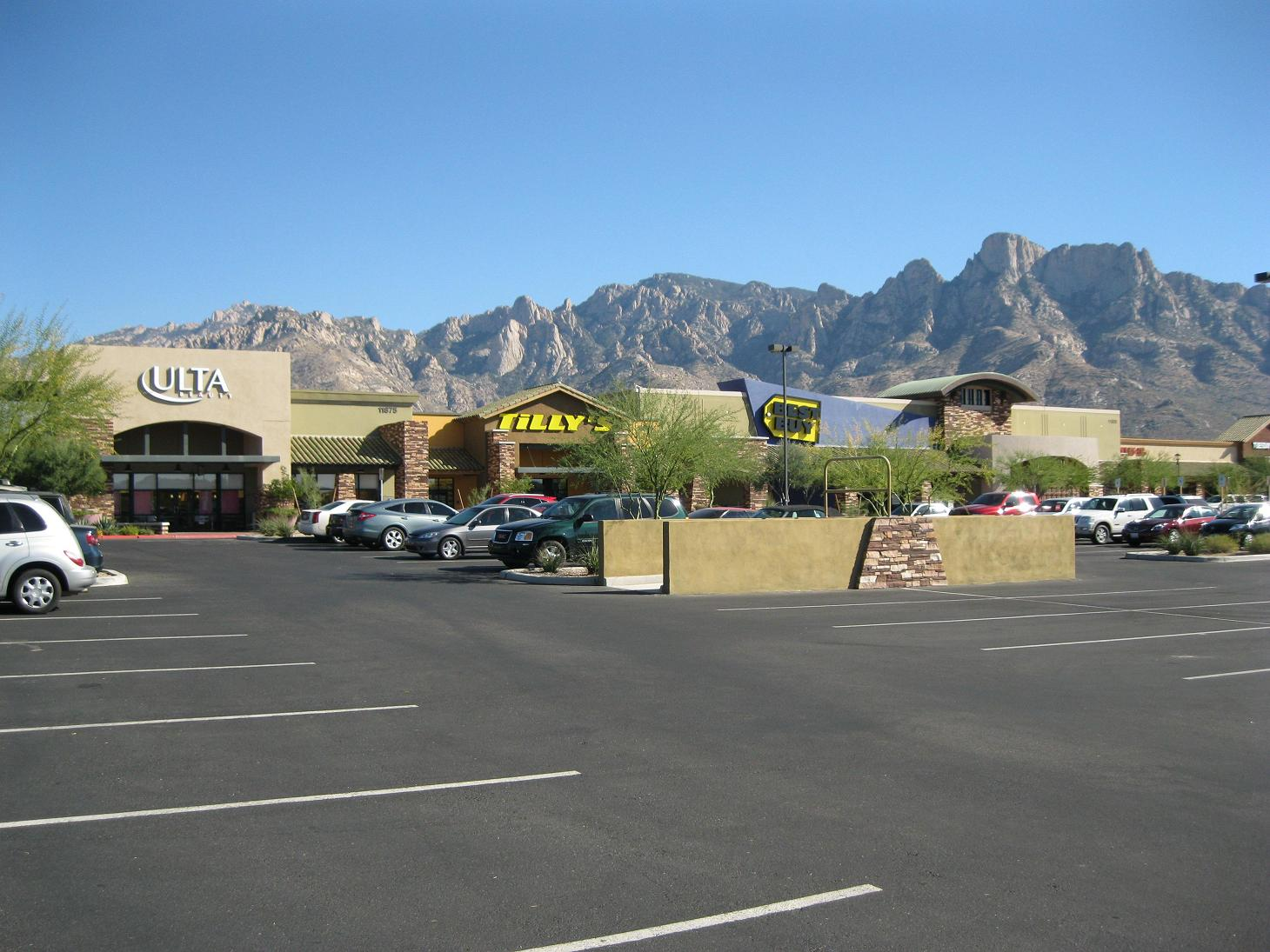
Stores at the Oro Valley Marketplace

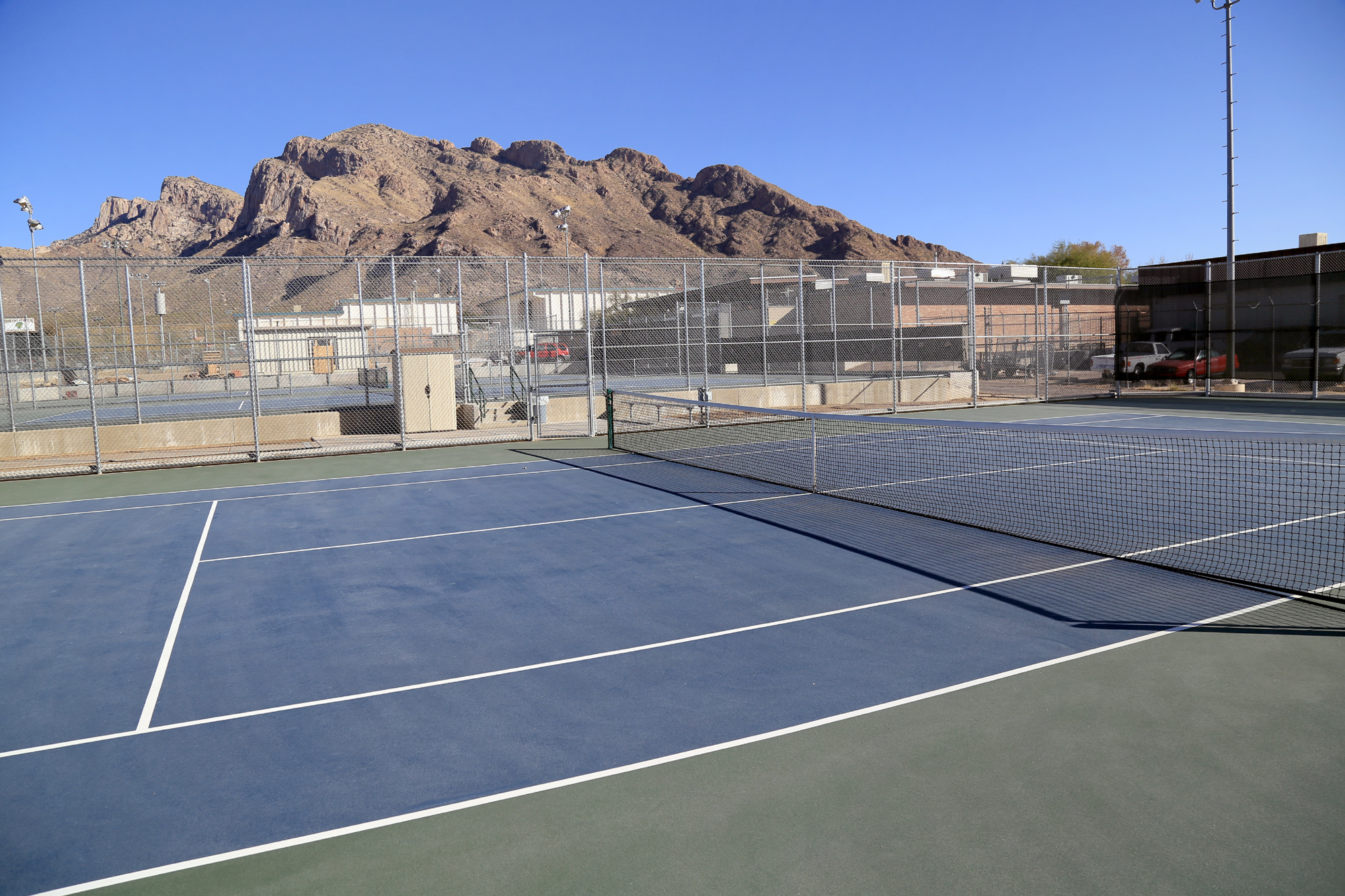
TCanyon Del Oro High School tennis courts in Oro Valley. Pusch Ridge is in the background.

Innovation Park is the high-tech center of Oro Valley and includes a number of medical and biotech campuses. Oro Valley's major employers include:

- Sanofi-Aventis: The world's third largest pharmaceutical company finished construction on a new 110,350-square-foot (10,252 m^{2}) facility in Innovation Park in 2009.
- Ventana Medical Systems: The 182,000-square-foot (16,900 m^{2}) international headquarters for the company are in Innovation Park. In 2008, Ventana was purchased by Roche Diagnostics. The firm was renamed as Roche Tissue Diagnostics, maintaining "Ventana" as a brand.
- Oro Valley Hospital: The 220,000-square-foot (20,000 m^{2}) hospital, along with a 70,000-square-foot (6,500 m^{2}) medical office building in Innovation Park, opened in 2008.
- Honeywell: Honeywell is a producer of electronic control systems and automation equipment. The Honeywell facility is located in unincorporated Pima County and completely surrounded by Oro Valley.

=== Golf and resorts ===
Oro Valley features several resorts and country clubs, including:

Name	Year founded
Oro Valley Country Club	1959
Hilton Tucson El Conquistador Golf & Tennis Resort	1982
Oro Valley Community Center	1982
The Golf Club at Vistoso	1995
The Views Golf Club	1997
The Stone Canyon Golf Club	1999
Stone Canyon Clubhouse	2016
Omni Tucson National Golf Resort & Spa (near Oro Valley)	1962
Westward Look Resort	1912
The Westin La Paloma Resort & Spa (near Oro Valley)	1986

=== Arts ===
Each winter, Musical Magic for Kids is held at the Oro Valley Town Hall along with multiple string quartet and choral performances throughout the town.

Every April, the Oro Valley Festival of the Arts is held to celebrate all forms of art and artistic expression. Live musical performances are held throughout the spring in the open-air amphitheater at the Cañada del Oro Riverfront Park.

The annual Independence Day celebration is one of the largest events in Oro Valley. The celebration includes performances by the Tucson Symphony Orchestra along with several choirs. Fireworks shows and concerts are also provided by the Hilton El Conquistador Resort.

The Oro Valley Music Festival is an annual outdoor music festival held over two days at the Golf Club at Vistoso, typically during the first weekend of October. The 2017 lineup included Gavin DeGraw, Lee Brice, LeAnn Rimes, Brothers Osborn and Echosmith.

Public art is exhibited throughout the year at the Oro Valley Hospital in Rancho Vistoso. A number of sculptures, murals, and statues are featured throughout Oro Valley.

== Law and government ==
Oro Valley employs the council-manager form of municipal government and is administered by a seven-member town council. The town council oversees all issues pertaining to Oro Valley including residential and commercial development and natural preservation.

Oro Valley residents elect all seven members of the town council, including a directly elected mayor. The vice mayor is appointed by the council from amongst its elected members. The mayor and vice mayor have no special powers and duties beyond chairing meetings.

- Mayor: Joseph C Winfield (term expires November 2026)
- Vice mayor: Melanie Barrett (term expires November 2026)

The remaining members of the Oro Valley Town Council include:

- Timothy Bohen (term expires November 2024)
- Harry "Mo" Green II (term expires November 2024)
- Joyce Jones-Ivey (term expires November 2026)
- Josh Nicholson (term expires November 2026)
- Steve Solomon (term expires November 2024)

The current acting town manager is Chris Cornelison, who took over the position in 2022 after Mary Jacobs resigned. The town manager's office provides executive-level leadership for the community by planning and directing town services. Communications, including Constituent Services and Economic Development, are under the town manager's department.

The legal services director, Tobin Sidles, is appointed by the town manager to act as the chief legal advisor to the mayor and council, boards and commissions, the town manager, and all town departments.

The town magistrate is the Honorable James Hazel.

The primary law enforcement agency in the town is the Oro Valley Police Department (OVPD) headed by Chief of Police Kara M. Riley. As of 2014, the OVPD employed 100 sworn police officers with a ratio of 2.43 officers per 1,000 citizens. In 2022, Oro Valley was ranked the safest place to live in Arizona based upon FBI crime statistics. It also ranked first every year from 2001 through 2006 for the lowest levels of violent crime and property crime among cities with populations of 5,000 or more. The OVPD has received national recognition for being one of only a few communities in the country where police officers are present at every public school and some private schools. The OVPD holds many community events on a monthly basis such as the Dispose-A-Med program where citizens can dispose of unused or expired prescription medications, the Shred-A-Thon where citizens can securely dispose of sensitive documents and records, Digital Child Identification which provides parents with a "biographical docket" of their child's information, a citizen's police academy to increase the public knowledge of the OVPD, and the Darkhouse program where homeowners can request police monitoring of their vacant residences while they are out of town.

Fire protection and emergency medical services for the town is provided by the Golder Ranch Fire District (GRFD). As of 2017, the GRFD covered a total of 241 square miles and employed 152 personnel with ten stations.

The town is located in Arizona's 1st congressional district, represented by Representative Tom O'Halleran, a Democrat, and Arizona's 11th state legislative district, represented by Representatives Mark Finchem and Vince Leach and Senator Steve Smith, all Republicans.

== Education ==
Public schools in Oro Valley are administered by Amphitheater Public Schools. Oro Valley is served by five public elementary schools, two K-8 schools, one middle school, and two high schools (Canyon del Oro High School and Ironwood Ridge High School).

Public schools serving Oro Valley include:

School	Year founded
Canyon del Oro High School	1962
Ironwood Ridge High School	2001
Richard B. Wilson K-8 School	1996
Coronado K-8 School	1976
L.W. Cross Middle School	1974
Copper Creek Elementary School	1988
Painted Sky Elementary School	2000
Innovation Academy STEM School	2017
Mesa Verde Elementary School	1978
Winifred Harelson Elementary School	1960

Oro Valley also has two charter schools, BASIS Schools Oro Valley (K-12) and Leman Academy of Excellence (K-8). The BASIS school made Newsweek's list of the top ten high schools in the nation, coming in third place. Oro Valley also has three private schools: Casas Christian School (K-8), Pusch Ridge Christian Academy (K-12), and Immaculate Heart Preparatory School (K-12).

== Transportation ==
Oro Valley is served by Sun Shuttle service to Tucson.

== Sites of interest ==
Catalina State Park in Oro Valley

- Steam Pump Ranch: Located in the heart of Oro Valley, the Steam Pump Ranch dates back to the mid-1870s when George Pusch settled in the area. Pusch was an Arizona state legislator and delegate to the Arizona Constitutional Convention in 1910. The ranch is in the process of being preserved by the town and includes several original buildings from the ranch itself. It was listed on the National Register of Historic Places in September 2009.
- Catalina State Park: Located on North Oracle Road (Arizona State Route 77), Catalina State Park has a number of hiking and backpacking trails including Romero Ruin Trail, Nature Trail, Romero Canyon Trail, Sutherland Trail, Canyon Loop Trail, 50-Year Trail, Birding Trail, and the Bridle Trail. Some trails are also open to equestrians and connect with other trails in the Coronado National Forest, continuing to Mount Lemmon, the highest peak in the Santa Catalina Mountains at 9,157 feet (2,791 m). The park also features several campgrounds and an equestrian center.

View from the Linda Vista Trail

- Immaculate Heart Preparatory School: The school is located in the former mansion of Margaret Howard, Countess of Suffolk. Built in 1937 as her winter residence, the estate is situated in the Suffolk Hills neighborhood of Oro Valley.
- Honey Bee Village: The Hohokam people occupied a small community in the foothills of the Tortolita Mountains beginning around 500 AD, and the remaining ruins are preserved by the town at the original site on Oro Valley's far north side.
- Bell House: The private estate was completed in the early 1940s. Located just south of Oro Valley, the estate has expansive views of the Tucson valley to the south. Still privately owned by the Bell family, the estate is closed to the public. Despite their claims to the contrary, the Bell family of Tucson is not descended from Alexander Graham Bell whose only living children were daughters.
- Romero Ranch: The ruins of the Romero Ranch are in the Catalina State Park to the east of Oro Valley. Established in 1844 by Francisco Romero, Romero Ranch was one of the first cattle ranches near the Santa Catalina Mountains.
- Canyon del Oro High School: Construction began on the school in the early 1960s before much of the area was developed. Located in south Oro Valley and directly adjacent to Pusch Ridge, the school is an established community center for the town.
- Oro Valley Public Library: The Oro Valley Public Library is located in the heart of Oro Valley with views of Pusch Ridge.

== Media ==
Oro Valley is served by the following publications:

- OV Style Magazine: A monthly lifestyle magazine mailed to homes in Oro Valley that highlights lifestyle topics, local events, businesses, and current topics for local residents.
- Arizona Daily Star: A morning daily paper that was sold by Pulitzer, Inc. to Lee Enterprises in 2005.
- Tucson Citizen: Established in 1870 as the Arizona Citizen, it was an afternoon daily paper that was the oldest continuously published newspaper in Arizona. It was owned by Gannett but has since ceased publication as of late August 2009.
- The Explorer: A free weekly newspaper covering northwest Tucson, Oro Valley, Marana, and the communities of Catalina Foothills, Tortolita, Catalina, and Oracle. It covers many aspects of suburban Tucson life including high-school sports and performances, cultural events, features, and stories of political interest.
- Tucson Weekly: An alternative publication that is distributed free at numerous locations around the greater Tucson area.

Oro Valley is also served by the following television stations: KVOA, KGUN-TV, KOLD-TV, KMSB, KTTU-TV, and KWBA-TV. KUAT-TV is a PBS affiliate run by the University of Arizona.

== Notable people ==
- Alex Bowman – professional stock car racing driver
- Ka'Deem Carey – professional football player
- Eli Crane – U.S. representative for Arizona's 2nd congressional district
- Brian Disbury – English first-class cricketer, lived in Oro Valley until his death in 2016
- Chris Duncan – professional baseball player
- Shelley Duncan – baseball player
- Scott Hairston – professional baseball player
- Ed Hochuli – NFL referee
- Ian Kinsler – Israeli-American professional baseball player
- Blake Martinez – professional football player
- E. William Quirin – businessman and Minnesota state legislator
- Lionel Sanders – professional triathlete
