= E. William Quirin =

American politician (1927–2009)

Emil William Qurin (June 25, 1927 – November 25, 2009) was an American businessman and politician.

Quirin was born in Harris, Osceola County, Iowa and graduated from Grand Meadow High School in Grand Meadow, Minnesota. He served in the United States Navy during World War II. Quirin went to the Rochester Community and Technical College in Rochester, Minnesota and was involved with the insurance business. He lived with his wife and family in Rochester, Minnesota and in Little Canada, Minnesota. Quirin served in the Minnesota House of Representatives from 1965 to 1968 and from 1971 to 1974. He was a Democrat. He then moved with his wife to Scottsdale, Arizona, in 1986, and then to Oro Valley, Arizona. He died from cancer at his home in Oro Valley, Arizona.
