= Amphitheater High School =

Location
- 125 West Yavapai Road; Tucson, Arizona 85705; United States; 32°16′10″N 110°58′29″W

Information
- Other names: Amphi
- Type: Public high school
- Established: 1939 (87 years ago)
- School district: Amphitheater Public Schools
- CEEB code: 030455
- Principal: A.J. Malis
- Teaching staff: 70.10 (FTE)
- Grades: 9–12
- Enrollment: 1,110 (2023–2024)
- Student to teacher ratio: 15.83
- Campus size: 50.74 acres (205,337 m²)
- Campus type: Urban
- Colors: Kelly green, white, black
- Mascot: Panthers
- Website: amphihigh.amphi.com

Amphitheater High School, also known as Amphi High, is a public high school, located in northwest Tucson, Arizona, United States. Amphi is the flagship high school of Amphitheater Public Schools of Tucson, and serves grades 9–12. The school mascot is the panther, and the school colors are kelly green and white. Amphi opened in 1939 as the second high school in Tucson, and has a student enrollment of 1,249. In the 1983–84 school year, it was honored as a Blue Ribbon school.

Its feeder schools are Amphi Middle and La Cima Middle.

== Notable alumni ==
- Mario Bates (1991), American football running back in the NFL for the New Orleans Saints, Arizona Cardinals, and the Detroit Lions
- Michael Bates (1989), 1992 Olympic bronze medal-winning sprinter and five-time Pro Bowl kick returner in the NFL
- Jeff Colter, former NFL defensive back
- Erubiel Durazo (1993), MLB baseball player; played for the Arizona Diamondbacks (1999–2002) where he won the 2001 World Series, and the Oakland Athletics (2003–2005)
- Riki Ellison (1978), (formerly Riki Gray), football player, USC Trojans, SF 49ers, LA Raiders
- Glenn Ezell, former MLB pitching coach and minor league catcher and manager
- George Gray (1985), TV announcer of The Price Is Right (2011–present)
- Savannah Guthrie (1989), NBC news anchor and legal correspondent
- Earl Hindman, actor, best known for role as Wilson on Home Improvement
- Alex Kellner, former MLB player (Philadelphia Athletics, Cincinnati Reds, Saint Louis Cardinals)
- Walt Kellner, former MLB player (Philadelphia Athletics)
- Sam Merriman (1979), NFL linebacker (Seattle Seahawks, 1983–87)
- James Penton (c. 1950), author on religious history, and university professor
- R Dub! (1995) Internationally syndicated radio DJ, sultan, world traveler
