= The Flinn Scholarship =

Merit based scholarship

The Flinn Scholarship is a merit-based scholarship awarded annually to 20 Arizona high school seniors. It provides four years of study at an Arizona public university, study abroad, a funded internship, personal mentorship by faculty and alumni Scholars, and other benefits. The total package is valued at more than $135,000.

== History ==
The Flinn Scholars Program has awarded the scholarship since 1986. The program is operated by the Flinn Foundation Scholarship Program LLC and supported by the Flinn Foundation, a Phoenix-based, private, nonprofit philanthropic endowment established in 1965 by Dr. and Mrs. Robert S. Flinn with the mission of improving the quality of life in Arizona. In addition to the Flinn Scholars program, the Flinn Foundation supports the advancement of the biosciences in Arizona, arts and culture, and the Arizona Center for Civic Leadership.

== Goals ==
The Flinn Foundation envisions Flinn Scholars as outstanding future leaders for Arizona in both public and private life—as business executives, researchers, artists, educators, and more.

== Benefits ==
Each recipient of the Flinn Scholarship receives the following benefits and opportunities: The full cost of tuition and mandatory fees, plus room and board; funding for a three-week summer seminar after the Scholar’s freshman year in China and for at least one additional study-abroad experience; funded participation in an internship program exclusively for Flinn Scholars; fellowship in a community of about 80 current and nearly 600 alumni Scholars; mentorship from faculty and exposure to Arizona and global leaders in business, government, science, and the arts; membership in a university honors college/program, with amenities including small classes, guest lectures, and research experiences; intellectual, cultural, and social activities developed exclusively for Flinn Scholars by both the Foundation and the universities.

== Application criteria ==
All applicants must be a U.S. citizen or legal permanent resident and Arizona resident for two full years immediately preceding entry to the university. Qualifying candidates typically have at least a 3.5 GPA; rank in the top 5 percent of their graduating class; score at least 1300 on the old SAT, 1360 on the new SAT, or 29 on the ACT; and demonstrate leadership in extracurricular activities. All applicants must attend one of Arizona's three public universities: Arizona State University in Tempe in the Phoenix Metropolitan Area, the University of Arizona in Tucson, and Northern Arizona University in Flagstaff.

== Application process ==
More than 900 applications are typically submitted. In 2021, the 20 Scholars were chosen from 951 applications submitted by Arizona high-school seniors—translating to an award rate of 2.1 percent.

=== Online application ===
An online application is made available in August each year with a mid-October deadline. The Flinn Scholar application consists of forms that collect biographical and family data and information about current studies, extracurricular activities, and employment; three essay questions and five short-answer questions; two teacher recommendations, submitted separately by your teachers; a report and recommendation from your high school’s academic counselor, submitted separately by your counselor; a copy of your transcript, uploaded by your counselor; copies of your SAT and/or ACT score reports, sent directly to the Flinn Scholars Program.

=== Interviews ===
The semifinalist interviews, which include about 80 applicants, take place in early January. About 40 applicants advance to the finalist interviews in late February or early March. Following the finalist interviews, scholar-designates and alternates are typically notified within a week. Scholar-designates can then accept or decline the scholarship until mid-April, after which alternates will be notified. The new Flinn Scholars are announced publicly by the Flinn Foundation in late April.

== See also ==
- Arizona State University
- Barrett, The Honors College at Arizona State University
- University of Arizona
- Northern Arizona University
- Udall Scholarship
- Barry M. Goldwater Scholarship
