= Petsburgh USA =

- Genre: Talk show
- Presented by: Brianne Leary
- Country of origin: United States
- Original language: English
- No. of seasons: 2
- No. of episodes: 130

Original release
- Network: Animal Planet
- Release: 1998 – 1999

Petsburgh USA is an American television program about pets, that premiered in 1998 on Animal Planet.

It was hosted by Brianne Leary and was filmed at a soundstage in the Disney-MGM Studios at the Walt Disney World Resort in Lake Buena Vista, Florida. The first season taped 65 episodes. A second season, taped in 1999, also consisted of 65 episodes.
