= Amphitheater Public Schools =

School district in Arizona, United States

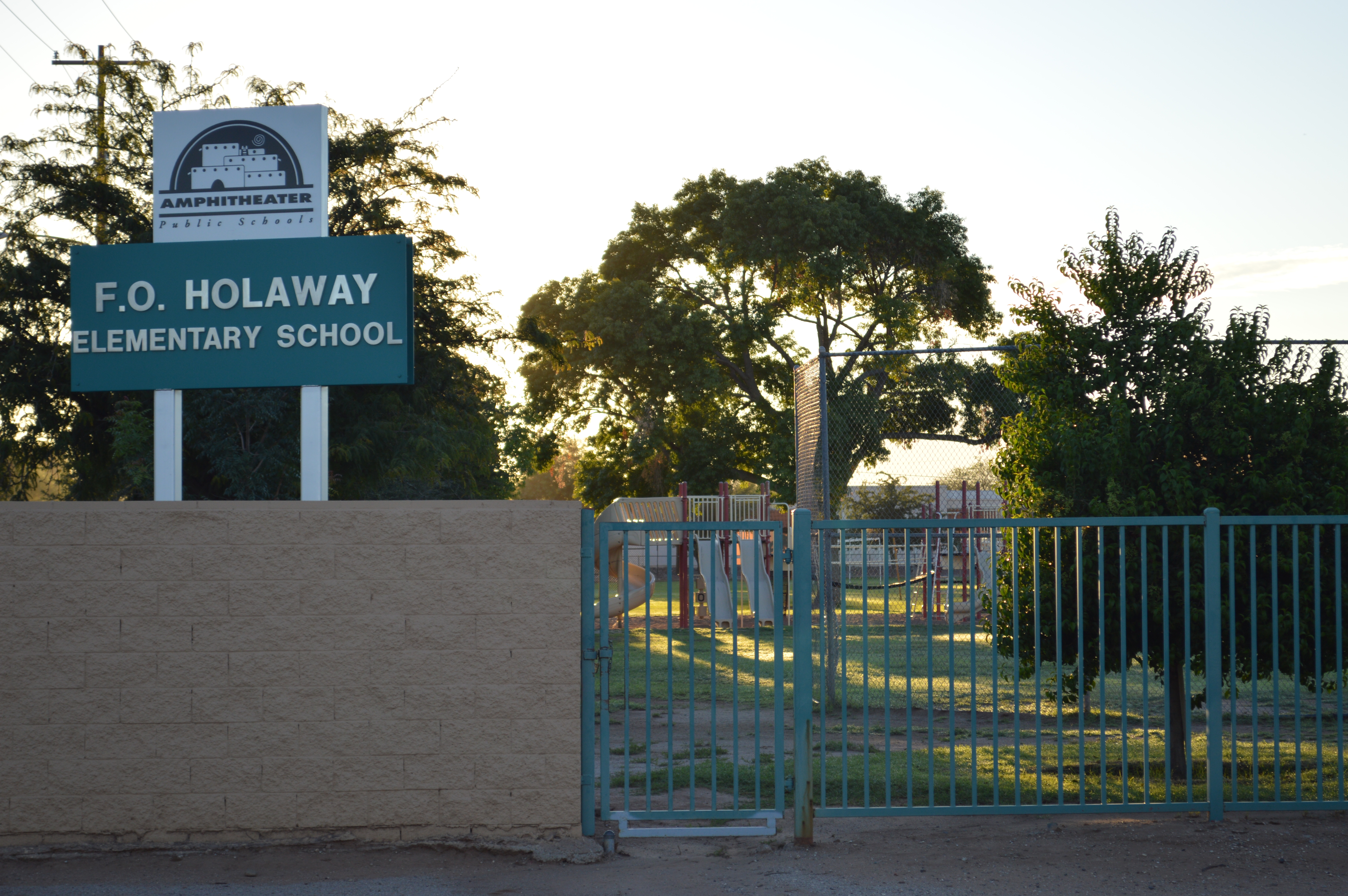
- F. O. Holaway Elementary School, one school part of Amphitheater Public Schools

Address
- 701 West Wetmore Road Flowing Wells, Arizona, 85705; United States
- Coordinates: 32°17′10″N 110°58′57″W

District information
- Type: Public
- Established: July 3, 1893; 133 years ago
- Superintendent: Todd Jaeger
- Schools: 21
- Enrollment: 13,500

Other information
- Website: www.amphi.com

Amphitheater Public Schools, also known as Amphi or District 10, is the third largest public school district in Tucson, Arizona, in terms of enrollment, with about 13,500 students and a staff of about 2000 employees Amphi was established on July 3, 1893. With its headquarters in Flowing Wells, presently serves segments of North Tucson (an area that is known as Amphitheater), Casas Adobes, Catalina Foothills, and the communities of Oro Valley, eastern Tortolita, and Catalina northwest of the city.

== District history ==
Following the Mexican–American War of 1848, American pioneers began to settle the Tucson area in increasing numbers. Ranchers and settlers developed homesteads in the rural area northwest of the city along the banks of the Rillito River. The community of Rillito was gradually established, and by 1889 the Rillito School District was organized (later to become the Flowing Wells School District).

Rillito residents desired a local school so district children would not be required to travel to the Congress Street School in downtown Tucson. The Rillito School Board proposed a site for a school, but a number of settlers asserted that the proposed location was as undesirable as the Congress Street School. These settlers resided on the eastern edge of the Rillito School District and eventually petitioned the Pima County Board of Supervisors to establish an independent school district. On July 3, 1893, Amphitheater Public Schools became a reality. According to Amphitheater High School graduate and historical writer for the Arizona Daily Star newspaper, David Leighton, the founding board members were rancher and assayer Edward L. Wetmore (the Wetmore family is the namesake of Wetmore Road in North Tucson), homesteader and carpenter Levi Marston Prince (namesake of Prince Road in North Tucson), and rancher Joseph D. Andrews.

The district's unique name relates to the geography of the Tucson basin. J. D. Andrews looked north toward the Tortolita Mountains and the Santa Catalina Mountains, east to the Rincon Mountains, south to the Santa Rita Mountains, and west to the Tucson Mountains and was reminded of an enormous amphitheater.

The original Amphitheater School opened in October 1893 with 11 students. In 1904, the district opened a permanent school building on the southeast corner of East Prince Road and North First Avenue in Tucson. Due to decreased enrollment, the school closed temporarily in 1910, quickly reopening with the enrollment increase. A final site for Amphitheater School was selected and the new school opened in 1913 at the present site of L. M. Prince School and Amphitheater Middle School on East Prince Road near North Stone Avenue.

The school expanded to include four additional classrooms in 1924. By 1928, the district established the Amphitheater Carnival, an annual community event that endured until 1958. By 1934 district enrollment had grown to over 500 students from 48 students in 1919.

By the 1930s, district residents desired the establishment of a district high school rather than continuing to send district high school students to Tucson High School in the Tucson Unified School District located near the University of Arizona in central Tucson. Using a combination of state and federal (Works Progress Administration) funding, Amphitheater High School was completed in 1939 on East Prince Road under the direction of E.C. Nash, the district's first superintendent appointed in 1937. Amphitheater High School became Tucson's second high school.

The Amphi district experienced gradual population growth, ultimately being dubbed Tucson's first suburb in the 1930s by the Arizona Daily Star newspaper. As residential and commercial growth progressed northward along the Oracle Road corridor, additional school sites were developed. The district boundaries and population continued to expand with the growth of the Tucson area, and by 1942, the district extended north of the Rillito River into the foothills of the Santa Catalina Mountains north of Tucson. By 1943, the district boundaries were finalized and extended north to the Pima County line. Dramatic growth transformed the district in the 1950s from a rural district into one of relatively urban character. Marion Donaldson was hired as district superintendent in 1951 and served in such a capacity until 1967, directing the development of the district.

Donaldson brought innovation in educational programs that received national recognition and also championed the construction of new schools in a community with a very limited tax base. A new junior high school was constructed with federal funds and later bond money, opening on September 8, 1952. In 1955, the junior high on West Yavapai Road became the campus for Amphitheater High School and the old senior high school building on East Prince Road became Amphitheater Junior High School.

The tremendous growth in the Tucson area following World War II in the 1950s prompted changes in the district. A divide gradually emerged in the district between the urban neighborhoods of North Tucson and the increasingly affluent suburbs north of the Rillito River. There was a continuing effort to purchase land for future school sites in the face of rising land costs in the foothills of the Santa Catalina Mountains. In 1955 a 20-acre (81,000 m^{2}) parcel northwest of North Oracle Road and West Ina Road cost the district $7,000 and was considered too far north and too costly. The parcel became the site of Winifred Harelson School in 1960. In 1958, Lawrence W. Cross became the assistant superintendent for the district.

The construction of Walker School in 1963 north of the Rillito River brought the "open classroom" and educational innovations to the district under the leadership of Evelyn Carswell as principal. The concept for learning at Walker School was focused on the individual student and individualized schedules, small and large group settings, and an ungraded school. These innovations brought national attention to the Amphitheater District, but eventually these changes were perceived as too radical and a return to more traditional educational structure was the final outcome.

Beginning in the fall of 1962, the Canyon del Oro School opened at the base of Pusch Ridge in the Santa Catalina Mountains serving as a middle school and later the district's second high school (beginning in the fall of 1964). CDO's first graduating class was in the summer of 1968. Population growth continued in the district as additional schools opened. By 2001, the district opened a third high school (Ironwood Ridge High School) to meet the growth needs in Oro Valley and the north side of the district.

At present, Amphi has a current enrollment of about 13,500 students across the 109-square-mile (280 km^{2}) district. Only Tucson Unified School District and Sunnyside Unified School District enroll more students in the Tucson metropolitan area. Amphi is an economically diverse district, serving disadvantaged communities in North Tucson, and affluent communities in Oro Valley and the Catalina Foothills.

Nine-year-old Christina-Taylor Green, a student at Mesa Verde Elementary, died in the 2011 Tucson shooting. The school provided grief counselors in response to the event.

Note: The Wetmore family and L. M. Prince were both featured in David Leighton's popular weekly column, Street Smarts, Sept. 18, 2012, and August 20, 2013, in the Arizona Daily Star newspaper.

== District schools ==
The following schools are part of Amphitheater Public Schools:

High Schools
Name	Location	Estab.	Mascot	Colors
Amphitheater High School	Sawtelle Place, Tucson	1939	Panthers	Kelly green, white
Canyon del Oro High School	Linda Vista Citrus, Oro Valley	1964	Dorados	Forest green, gold
Ironwood Ridge High School	Oro Valley	2001	Nighthawks	Navy blue, silver, white

Middle Schools
Name	Location	Estab.	Mascot	Colors
Amphitheater Middle School	Catalina, Tucson	1893, 1956	Scholarly Pirates	Dark green, black
L. W. Cross Middle School	Casas Adobes	1974	Rams	Red, black
La Cima Middle School	Casas Adobes	1989	Cardinals	Red, yellow

K–8 Schools
Name	Location	Estab.	Mascot	Colors
Coronado K8 School	Catalina	1976	Cougar	Blue, silver
R. B. Wilson K–8 School	Oro Valley	1996	Wranglers	Blue, green

Elementary Schools
Name	Location	Estab.	Mascot	Colors
Helen Keeling School	Coronado Heights, Tucson	November 12, 1947	Cougars	Blue, yellow
L.M. Prince School	Pastime Acres, Tucson	1953	Mustangs	Kelly green, white
F.O. Holaway School	Richland Heights, Tucson	1957	Coyotes	Red, white
Winifred Harelson School	Catalina Citrus Estates, Casas Adobes	1960	Bobcats	Red, white
E.C. Nash School	Miracle Mile, Tucson	1960	Roadunners	Blue, white
Lulu Walker School	Riverside Terrace, Casas Adobes	1963	Wolves	Teal, tan
Marion Donaldson School	Rancho Palos Verdes, Casas Adobes	1971	Dolphins	Blue, yellow
Mesa Verde School	Casas Adobes	1978	Mountain lions	Blue, silver
Río Vista School	El Abrigo, Tucson	1986	Bulldogs	Light blue, white
Copper Creek School	Copper Creek, Oro Valley	1988	Hawks	Copper, teal
Painted Sky School	Oro Valley	2001	Thunderbird	Purple, yellow
Innovation Academy	Oro Valley	2017	Scorpions	Purple, Blue, Orange

Alternative Schools
Name	Location	Estab.
Amphitheater Alternative High School	Casas Adobes	1981
El Hogar de la Paz	Roberta Terrace, Tucson	
Rillito Center	Catalina, Tucson	
