= Central High School (Phoenix, Arizona) =

High school in Phoenix, Arizona

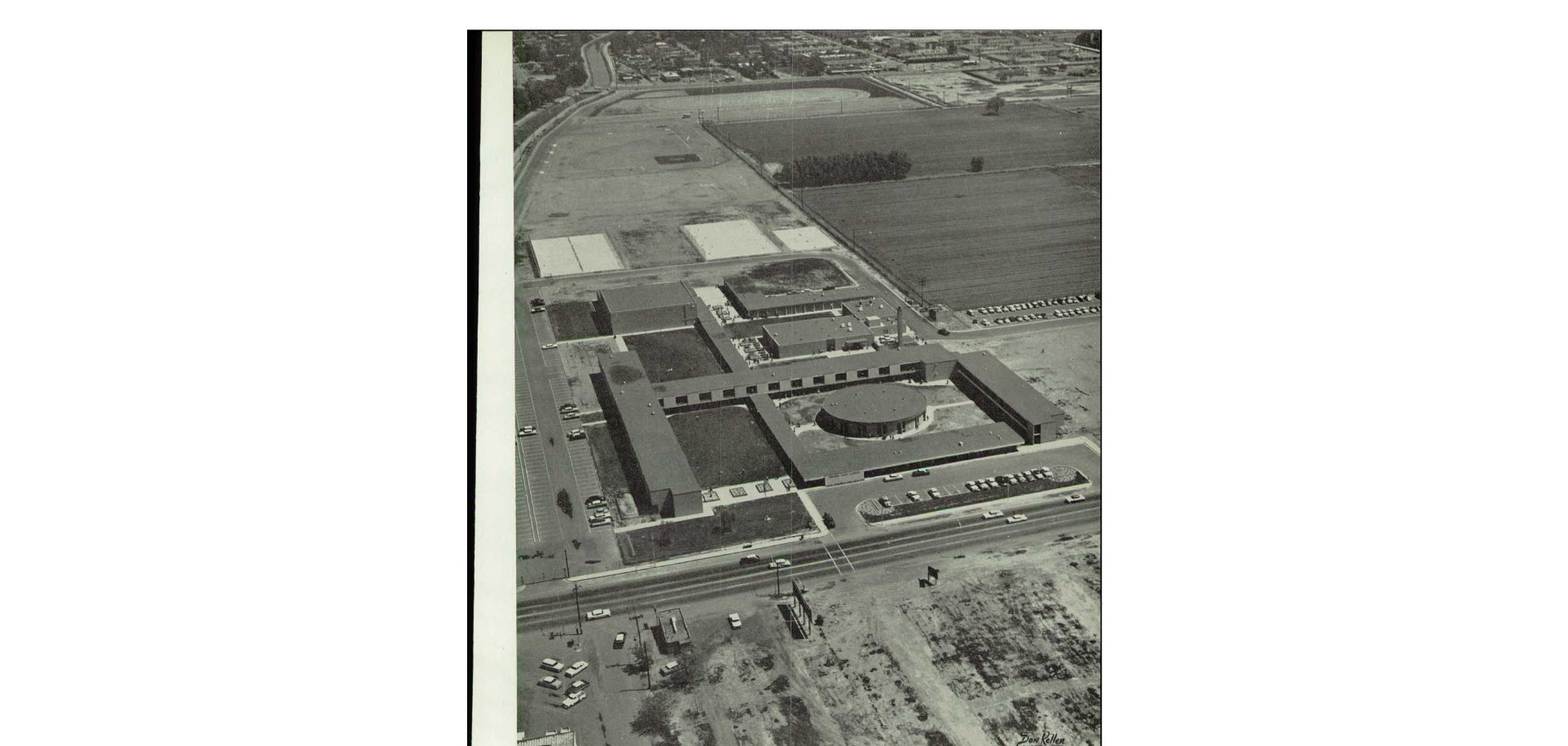
- Aerial photo of Central High School in its first year, 1958

Location
- 4525 North Central Avenue; Phoenix, Arizona 85012; United States; 33.502553°N 112.072922°W

Information
- Type: Public secondary school
- Established: 1957; 69 years ago
- Principal: Danielle (Dani) Shields
- Staff: 112.50 (FTE)
- Faculty: Approx. 231
- Grades: 9-12
- Enrollment: 1,758 (2023-2024)
- Student to teacher ratio: 15.63
- Colors: Red and Gray
- Mascot: Bobcat
- Website: www.pxu.org/o/chss

Central High School is a high school in the Phoenix Union High School District, Phoenix, Arizona, United States. The campus is located at 4525 North Central Avenue, just north of downtown. It was established in 1957.

== History ==
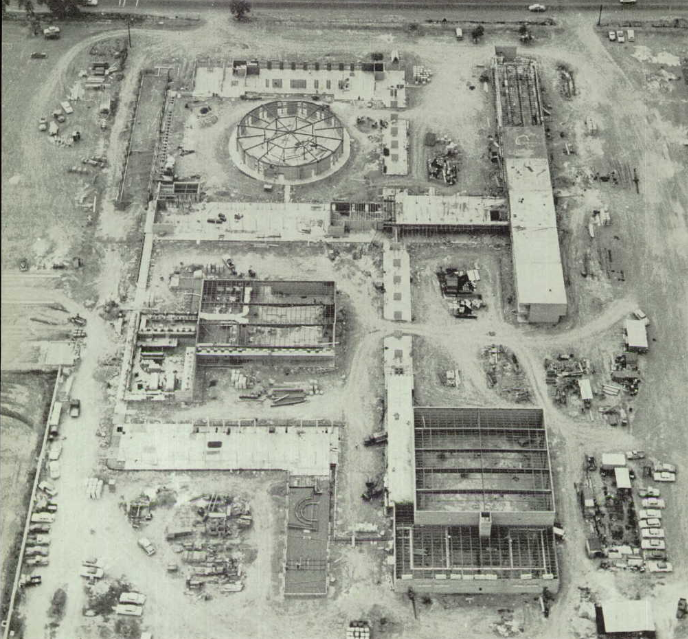
Aerial photo of Central High School construction in 1957

The school was built in 1957. It was designed by noted Phoenix architect John Sing Tang. The construction of the school was completed by Weeks Construction Co. and D. O. Norton & Son Construction Co. both of Phoenix.

== Enrollment ==
As of 2006, Central's enrollment was 2,370 students. That year over 60 percent of the population was Hispanic. Central also has the highest percentage of Caucasian students in the district, as well as the highest percentage of Native Americans. Central also is noted for its substantial refugee population, one of the largest in the state.

The school predominantly serves students from partner elementary districts Alhambra, Creighton, Madison, Osborn, and Phoenix Elementary. However, students from across the district come to Central for its Phoenix Union Magnet Program in International Studies. Students zoned to Arthur M. Hamilton School of the Murphy School District, meaning those in the district east of Interstate 17 and north of the Maricopa Freeway, are zoned to Central.

The Arizona Department of Education has designated Central a "performing" school. Central has had 96 students recognized as National Merit Scholars in the past 15 years. The International Studies program includes foreign exchange programs.

== Notable alumni ==
=== Sports ===
- Trung Canidate – National Football League (NFL) running back
- Bryan Colangelo – National Basketball Association executive
- Lois Drinkwater – sprinter and the first Arizona female to run in the Olympics (1968 as a junior)
- Azur Kamara – NFL defensive end
- Damon Mays – NFL wide receiver
- Darryl Morrison – NFL safety
- Dave Rajsich – Major League Baseball (MLB) player
- Jay Schlueter – MLB player

=== Entertainment and music ===
- Mark Coggins – author
- Richard Page (class of 1971) – lead singer and bassist of the pop rock band Mr. Mister
- Samantha Ponder – ESPN personality
- Sharman Apt Russell (class of 1972) – author
- Prairie Prince – drummer and co-founder of the art rock band The Tubes.
- Rick Anderson - bassist and co-founder of the art rock band The Tubes.
- Larry Gonick - cartoonist best known for The Cartoon History of the Universe.
- Bob Glouberman - actor known for roles on Arrested Development and The Office.
- Joanna Johnson - actress and producer known for The Bold and The Beautiful.
- Tony Tripoli - actor, comedian and LGBT rights activist known for his work with Joan Rivers.

=== Politics ===
- Rosanna Gabaldón – member of the Arizona House of Representatives
- Phil Gordon – 58th mayor of Phoenix

=== Other ===
- Ian Bruce (class of 1962) – professor and vice-president of the Royal National Institute of Blind People (RNIB)
- Cindy McCain – American businesswoman, philanthropist, humanitarian, special educator, and author
