= Phoenix Union High School District =

Public school in Arizona

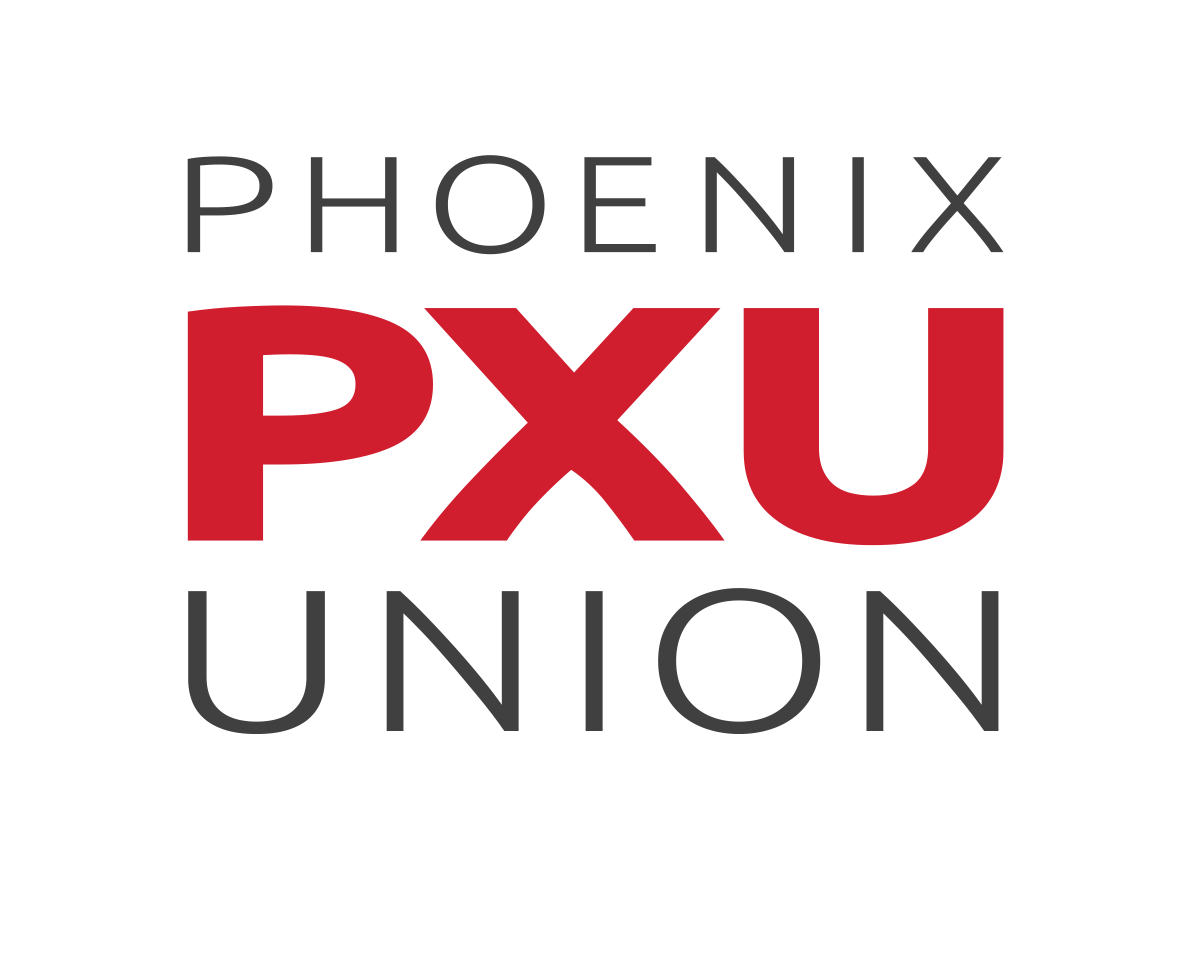

Address
- 4502 N. Central Ave. Phoenix, Arizona, 85012; United States
- Coordinates: 33.5023°N 112.0747°W

District information
- Type: Public secondary school
- Motto: "Preparing Every Student for Success in College, Career and Life"
- Grades: 9–12
- Established: 1895; 131 years ago
- Superintendent: Thea Andrade
- NCES District ID: 0406330

Students and staff
- Enrollment: 27,037 (2020-2021)
- Faculty: 2,777
- Student–teacher ratio: 18.27

Other information
- Website: www.pxu.org

The Phoenix Union High School District is a high school-only school district in Phoenix, Arizona, United States. It is one of five high school-only districts in the metro Phoenix area.

== Overview ==
Phoenix Union High School District (PXU) is one of the largest and most progressive high school districts in the United States. The school district serves students within a 220 square miles (570 km^{2}) area of metro Phoenix, and enrollment is 23,380 students enrolled within its 23 schools. Its boundaries are largely coextensive with the city of Phoenix prior to the 1960s. As of 2020, the district covers much of Phoenix and portions of Glendale, Paradise Valley, and Scottsdale.

The district has a non-diverse population including 81.4% of its students being identified as "Hispanics", and 44.7% of its students speaking Spanish at home. In all, over 100 languages have been identified as primary home languages. 9.4% of students in the district are African American and 3.9% of students are Caucasian.

The district employs approximately 3,000 staff, with 1,330 of them being teachers.

The school district has no elementary or middle schools, and as such, it has identified 13 elementary school districts as its Partner Elementary Districts, with students who enroll with those districts being fed into PUHSD's high schools.

== History ==
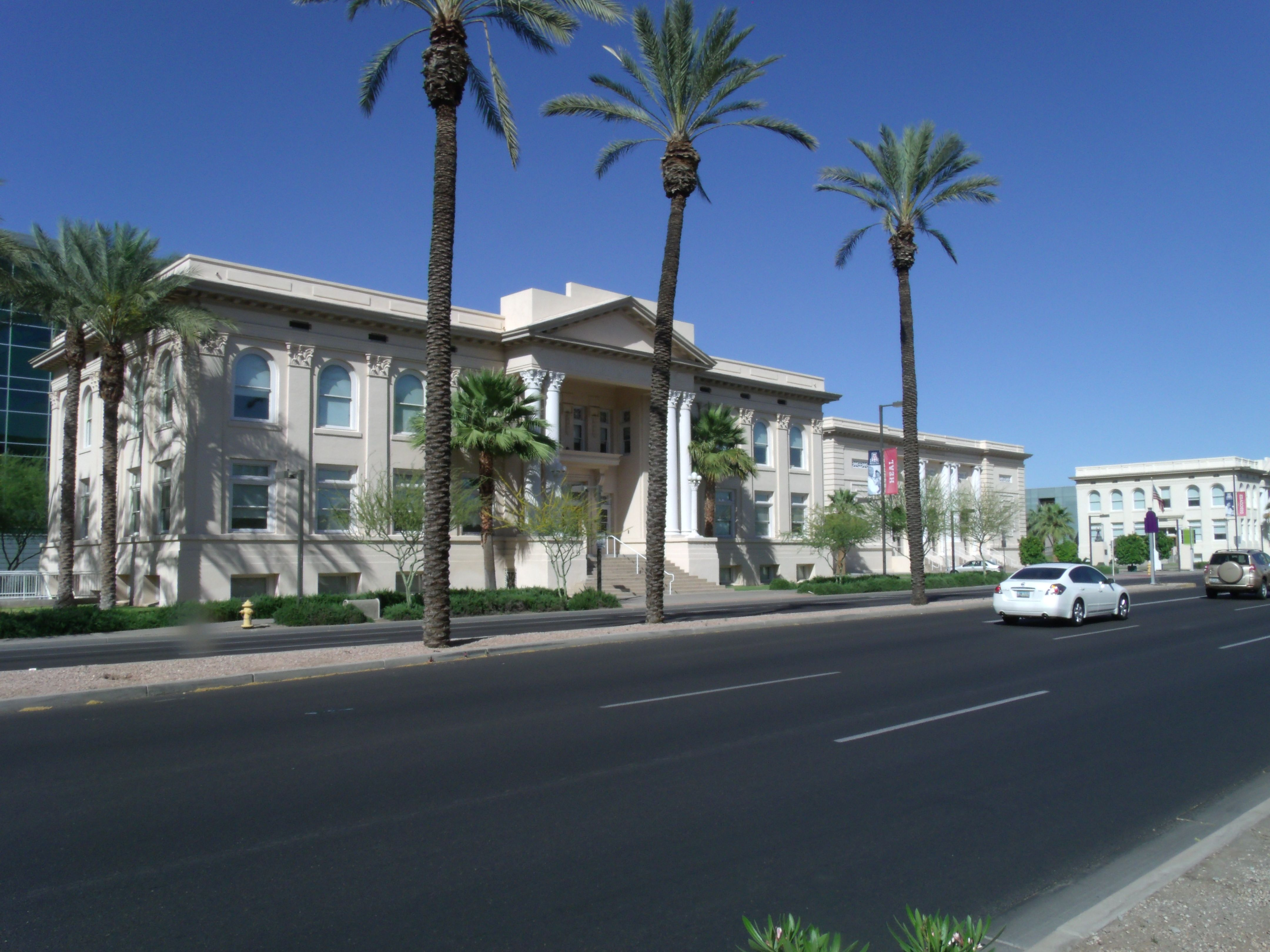
Phoenix Union High School

The school district's roots lie with the opening of Phoenix Union High School in 1895. In that same year, Arizona's Territorial Legislature passed a law that allowed districts with at least 2,000 residents to form a high school.

Phoenix Union High School first opened with four classrooms and 90 students, on the second floor of an elementary school building, but eventually moved into its final location, near 7th Street and Van Buren. The school campus was a former mansion, and was chosen at the time because it was located in a residential area, bordered in part by two arterial streets. PUHS also affected later developmental patterns in the area.

=== Phoenix College ===
In 1920, Phoenix Union High School District opened Phoenix College as Phoenix Junior College, after consultation with University of Arizona and the designing of a two-year curriculum. The school, however, was considered to be extra-legal, as no laws authorized its existence. That changed in 1927, after the Arizona State Legislature authorized and legalized the creation and maintenance of Junior Colleges in Arizona. Phoenix Union High School District would vote to transfer Phoenix College to the Maricopa County Community College District in 1963.

=== Segregation of African American students ===
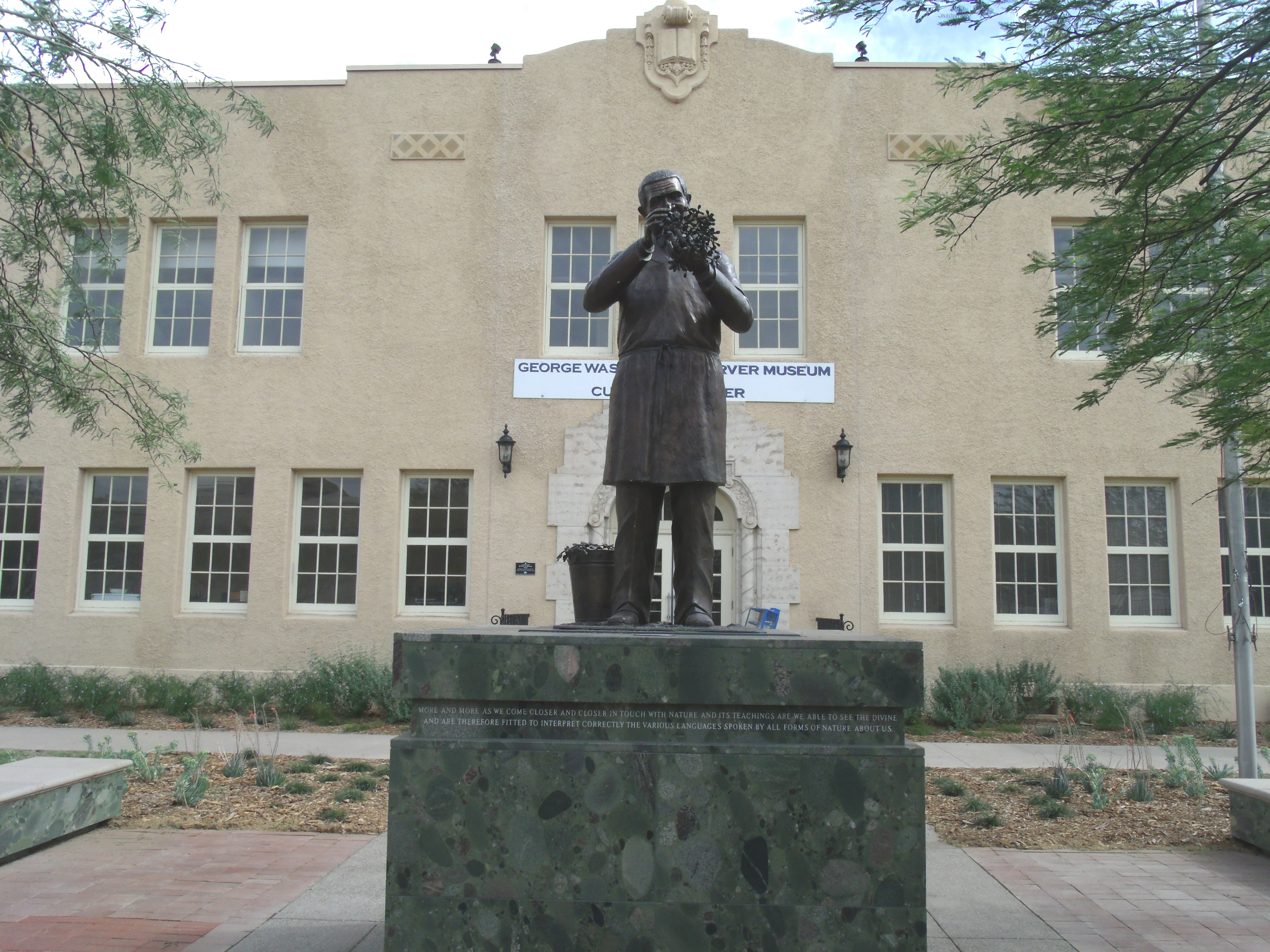
Phoenix Union Colored High School (later George Washington Carver High School)

Beginning in the late 1910s, Phoenix Union High School District began segregating its White and African American students. While segregation of elementary schools in Arizona was mandated, segregation of high schools was never required under Arizona law.

In 1918, a "Department for Colored Students" that was established at a rear room of Phoenix Union High School's Commercial Building, with one teacher. The school's African American students were then housed in two small cottages that were separated from the PUHS campus by an irrigation ditch., and later placed at a rented house on 9th Street and Jefferson.

A plot of land that would later become the Phoenix Union Colored High School (later George Washington Carver High School) was purchased in 1925. The site, a former four-acre landfill that was surrounded by warehouses, drew protests over safety and sanitary concerns. The school, however, was opened in 1926, and was the only one ever built exclusively to serve African American high school students in Arizona.

The school was closed in 1954, a year after a judge at the Maricopa County Superior Court ruled school segregation in Phoenix high schools was unconstitutional, in the case Phillips vs. Phoenix Union High Schools and Junior College District. PUHS, along with Carl Hayden High School and South Mountain High School, took on the bulk of the school district's African American students after desegregation. Phoenix Union High School District's website states that Carver High was built to accommodate the district's African American population, and stating that the school closed following integration.

=== Expansions ===
Until 1926, Phoenix Union High School was the school district's only school. By 1939, PUHS' student population reached 5,219, and North High School, the first school not built for the purpose of segregation, opened its doors.

Between 1949 and 1957, five additional high schools were built: Camelback, Carl Hayden, Central, West, and South Mountain. Those were followed by Alhambra, East, and Maryvale in the 1960s. Trevor G. Browne opened its doors in 1970s, along with alternative schools Bostrom High and Desiderata Program

=== Changes ===
The racial makeup of Phoenix Union High School District schools began to change during the 1950s and 1960s. PUHS' African American and Hispanic population increased during those two decades, and by 1970, the school's White population fell to 19.3% of the student body. Meanwhile, violence between the school's Hispanic and African-American population eventually played a large role in everyday school life, with each side blaming the other side.

A riot brought on by racial tensions also happened during the 1970s at South Mountain High School.

=== Closures and lawsuits ===
In the 1980s, Phoenix Union High School District's board voted to close North High, PUHS, and East High, and West High, due to declining enrollment.

As a result of the closures, two lawsuits were filed, accusing the Phoenix Union High School District of discriminating against ethnic minorities and low-income students by closing schools in their neighborhoods, in addition to unfair resource allocations.

An Office for Civil Rights investigation also found that the school district had an open enrollment policy that, while designed to alleviate school overcrowding, resulted in racial imbalance. The school district, according to the investigation, was fully aware of the policy's impact, and, despite numerous recommendations, chose not to take action of the matter.

The lawsuits were later consolidated into the Castro v. Phoenix Union High School District lawsuit. Eventually, a federal judge ruled against the school district. A consent decree followed the ruling, which resulted in the reopening of North High, as well as, among other things, the establishment of magnet programs across the district, continued summer school programs, increased transportation options for students, and the building of two more high schools.

=== 1990s and 2000s ===
In 1999, Cactus Canyon High School opened its doors (initially named Cesar Chavez High School), becoming the first Phoenix Union High School to be built in 27 years. Another comprehensive high school, Betty H. Fairfax High School, opened in 2007.

The 2000s also saw the building of a number of specialty schools. Suns-Diamondbacks Education Academy (since renamed Linda Abril Educational Academy), a school for at-risk students, was established in 2001. Franklin Police and Fire High School, a first-of-its-kind public safety-oriented school, opened in 2007. Bioscience High opened in 2006.

=== 2010s ===
The district was considering whether to open another high school as other high schools were above capacity.

=== 2020s ===
The district chose to enact a mask mandate in 2021, during the COVID-19 pandemic in Arizona even though Governor of Arizona Doug Ducey signed a ban against mask mandates on June 30.

Following allegations of sexual abuse made against Cesar Chavez in March 2026, the district voted to rename Cesar Chavez High School as part of a broader city initiative to remove Chavez's name from public places. The school will temporarily be known as Champions Circle High School, keeping the CCHS initialism, until a permanent name can be decided.

== Schools ==
=== Comprehensive schools ===
- Academies at South Mountain (Phoenix) – opened 1954 (formerly South Mountain High School)
- Alhambra (Phoenix) – opened 1961
- Camelback (Phoenix) – opened 1954
- Carl Hayden (Phoenix) – opened 1957
- Central (Phoenix) – opened 1957
- Cactus Canyon (Laveen) – opened 1999 (formerly Cesar Chavez High School)
- Betty Fairfax (Laveen) – opened 2007
- Maryvale (Phoenix) – opened 1963
- North (Phoenix) – opened 1939
- Metro Tech (Phoenix) – opened 1985
- Trevor Browne (Phoenix) – opened 1972

=== Small and alternative schools ===
- Bioscience (Phoenix) – opened 2006
- Bostrom High School (Phoenix) – opened 1976
- Desiderata Program (Phoenix) – opened 1977
- Franklin Police and Fire High School (Phoenix) – opened 2007
- Linda Abril Educational Academy (Phoenix) – opened 2001
- Phoenix Coding Academy (Phoenix) - opened 2016
- Phoenix Digital Academy (Phoenix) - opened 2020
- Phoenix Union Wilson College Prep (Phoenix) - opened 2017
- PXU City (Phoenix) - opened 2023

=== Micro Schools ===
- Advanced Readiness at Chavez High (ARCH) (Phoenix) - opened 2021
- Camelback Montessori (Phoenix) - opened 2012
- Maryvale Gifted & Talented Academy (Phoenix) - opened 2017

=== Former ===
- George Washington Carver High School (1926–1954)
- East High School (1964–1982)
- Phoenix Union High School (1912–1982)
- West High School (1949–1983)

== Feeder elementary school districts ==
- Alhambra Elementary School District
- Balsz Elementary School District
- Cartwright Elementary School District
- Creighton Elementary School District
- Isaac Elementary School District
- Laveen Elementary School District
- Madison Elementary School District
- Murphy Elementary School District
- Osborn Elementary School District
- Phoenix Elementary School District
- Riverside Elementary School District
- Roosevelt Elementary School District
- Wilson Elementary School District
