= West High School (Phoenix, Arizona) =

- Phoenix, Arizona

Information
- Type: Public secondary school
- Established: 1949
- Closed: 1983
- Grades: 9-12
- Enrollment: 1,723 (1982)
- Mascot: Thunderbirds

West High School was a high school that formed part of the Phoenix Union High School District in Phoenix, Arizona.

== History ==
West High School was one of five Phoenix Union high schools that were built between 1949 and 1957, the others being Camelback, Carl Hayden, Central, and South Mountain.

The campus was designed by a group of local architects consisting of Lescher & Mahoney, Edward L. Varney, H. H. Green and Edwin Dwight Chenault.

Declining enrollment during the 1980s resulted in the closure of West, along with North High School, Phoenix Union High School, and East High School.

Metro Tech High School, then named Metro Tech Vocational Institute of Phoenix, was opened on the grounds of West High in 1985.

== Campus ==
The campus used to have an Olympic-sized swimming pool, but was later filled in. The site of the pool later became the school's cafeteria.

The school also had a Foucault pendulum that was dedicated in 1959.
