= List of school districts in Phoenix =

The following is a list of school districts that serve the city of Phoenix, Arizona.

Many separate independent school districts serve Phoenix. This is a legacy of the city expanding through annexation of bordering territory; many of the school districts were in existence prior to their territories becoming part of the city.

Most of the city is split between elementary school districts that serve grades kindergarten through 8. The elementary school districts are paired with high school districts that serve grades 9 through 12.

Small portions of Phoenix are served by unified school districts, which serve grades K through 12.

One small portion of the city limits is not in any school district.

School districts include:

== Unified school districts ==
- Cave Creek Unified School District
- Deer Valley Unified School District
- Paradise Valley Unified School District
- Scottsdale Unified School District

== High school districts ==
- Glendale Union High School District
- Phoenix Union High School District
- Tempe Union High School District
- Tolleson Union High School District

== Elementary school districts ==
- Alhambra Elementary School District
- Balsz Elementary School District
- Cartwright Elementary School District
- Creighton Elementary School District
- Fowler Elementary School District
- Isaac Elementary School District
- Kyrene Elementary School District
- Laveen Elementary School District
- Littleton Elementary School District
- Madison Elementary School District
- Murphy Elementary School District
- Osborn Elementary School District
- Pendergast Elementary School District
- Phoenix Elementary School District
- Riverside Elementary School District
- Roosevelt Elementary School District
- Tempe Elementary School District
- Tolleson Elementary School District
- Union Elementary School District
- Washington Elementary School District
- Wilson Elementary School District
