= Alhambra High School (Arizona) =

Location
- 3839 West Camelback Road; Phoenix, Arizona 85019; United States; 33°30′31″N 112°08′30″W

Information
- Type: Public secondary school
- Established: 1961; 65 years ago
- School district: Phoenix Union High School District
- NCES District ID: 0406330
- NCES School ID: 040633000538
- Principal: Dr. Jodi Weber
- Staff: 122.00 (FTE)
- Faculty: 161
- Grades: 9-12
- Enrollment: 2,118 (2023-2024)
- Student to teacher ratio: 17.36
- Color
- Mascot: Lion
- Website: www.pxu.org/o/ahs

Alhambra High School is a high school that forms part of the Phoenix Union High School District in Phoenix, Arizona. The campus is located at 3839 West Camelback Road, northwest of downtown Phoenix, Arizona, United States.

The school predominantly serves students from partner elementary districts Alhambra, Isaac and Phoenix Elementary, although students from across the district come to Alhambra for its Phoenix Union Magnet Program—Medical and Health Studies.

== History ==
Alhambra High was founded in 1961, and was, along with East and Maryvale, one of three schools opened by the Phoenix Union High School District in the 1960s.

The campus was designed by the noted local architecture firm of Weaver & Drover. The construction contract to build the school was awarded to Gilbert & Dolan Construction Co.

== Student population ==
The school, like all other schools within the PUHSD, is a minority-majority school. 77.6% of the students enrolled are identified as "Hispanics". African Americans form 7.2% of the student population.

== Sports ==
Alhambra's Boys Basketball team won two state titles, in 1974 and 1985, under coach Phil Kemp. The team defeated East High in 1974, and Catalina High School in 1985.

The school's Boys Cross Country team has been placed first in a number of occasions: 2010, 2009, and 2007.

== Notable alumni ==
- Esthefanny Barreras - pro soccer player
- Billy Boat - auto racer; 2nd place, Indy 500
- Bob Breunig - pro football player
- Paul Cook - science fiction writer
- Eric Johnson - pro football player
- Michelle Johnson - actress
- Jason P. Lester - endurance athlete
- Steve Malovic (1956–2007), American-Israeli basketball player
- Ted Sarandos - Chief Content Officer for Netflix
