= Camelback High School =

Location
- 4612 North 28th Street; Phoenix, Arizona 85016; 33°30′15″N 112°01′23″W

Information
- Type: Public secondary school
- Motto: Once a Spartan, always a Spartan
- Established: 1954; 72 years ago
- Principal: Leon S. Kennedy
- Staff: 120.00 (FTE)
- Faculty: Approx. 177
- Grades: 9–12
- Enrollment: 2,191 (2023–2024)
- Student to teacher ratio: 18.26
- Colors: Blue and orange
- Mascot: Spartan
- Website: www.pxu.org/o/chs

Camelback High School is part of the Phoenix Union High School District. The campus is located at 4612 North 28th Street, northeast of downtown Phoenix, Arizona, United States. Camelback's enrollment is just over 2,200 students, over 75 percent of whom are Hispanic. The school predominantly serves students from partner elementary districts Balsz, Creighton, Madison and Wilson. During the 2023–2024 school year, Camelback was named a National Demonstration School for the Center for High School Success.

== History ==
Camelback was designed by a group of noted local architects consisting of Lescher & Mahoney, Edward L. Varney, H. H. Green and John Sing Tang with Harold Ekman and Fred M. Guirey as consultant and supervising architects. The construction contract to build the school was awarded to Mardian Construction Co. The campus was renovated in 2007 with many of the outdated original buildings demolished and replaced with new buildings. Architectural Resource Team drew up the planes for the renovation. Phoenix City Council District 6 candidate

== Notable alumni ==
- Brad Buxer – musician, composer
- Billy Mayfair – professional golfer
- Michael Meldman – real estate developer
- John Shadegg – US House of Representatives
- Neal Smith – drummer for band Alice Cooper
- Frank Spotnitz – writer, producer
- Melody Thornton – singer
- Mark Whipple – football coach, University of Massachusetts

== Trivia ==
Camelback High School is referenced in the song "Alma Mater" by Alice Cooper, whose drummer Neal Smith is an alumnus.
