= Phoenix Union High School =

Former school in Phoenix, Arizona

Coordinates: 33°27′10″N 112°3′51″W

Location
- 512 East Van Buren St; Phoenix, Arizona; United States

Information
- Type: Public secondary school
- Established: 1895
- Status: Closed
- Closed: 1982
- Grades: 9–12
- Enrollment: 1,274 (1982)
- Colors: Red and black
- Mascot: Coyotes
- Phoenix Union High School Historic District
- U.S. National Register of Historic Places
- U.S. Historic district
- Area: 18 acres (7.3 ha)
- Architect: Norman F. Marsh (original 3 buildings); Lescher, Kibby and Mahoney (Liberal Arts Building and the Stadium); Fitzhugh and Byron (designed the Phoenix College, now Unit A)
- Architectural style: Beaux Arts, Renaissance, Mission/Spanish Revival
- NRHP reference No.: 82002085
- Added to NRHP: July 15, 1982

Phoenix Union High School (PUHS) was a high school that was part of the Phoenix Union High School District in downtown Phoenix, Arizona, one of five high school-only school districts in the Phoenix area. Founded in 1895 and closed in 1982, the school consisted of numerous buildings on a campus which by 1928 consisted of 18 acres.

In 1982, the majority of the campus was listed on the National Register of Historic Places as the Phoenix Union High School Historic District The PUHS campus was included in the Phoenix Historic Property Register in 1986, and received landmark designation in 2003.

The campus is now part of the Phoenix Biomedical Campus, including three buildings on East Van Buren Street between North 5th and North 7th Streets built in 1911–1912 and designed by Norman Foote Marsh in the Neoclassical style. As of 2007, these three buildings became part of the University of Arizona College of Medicine – Phoenix.

== History ==
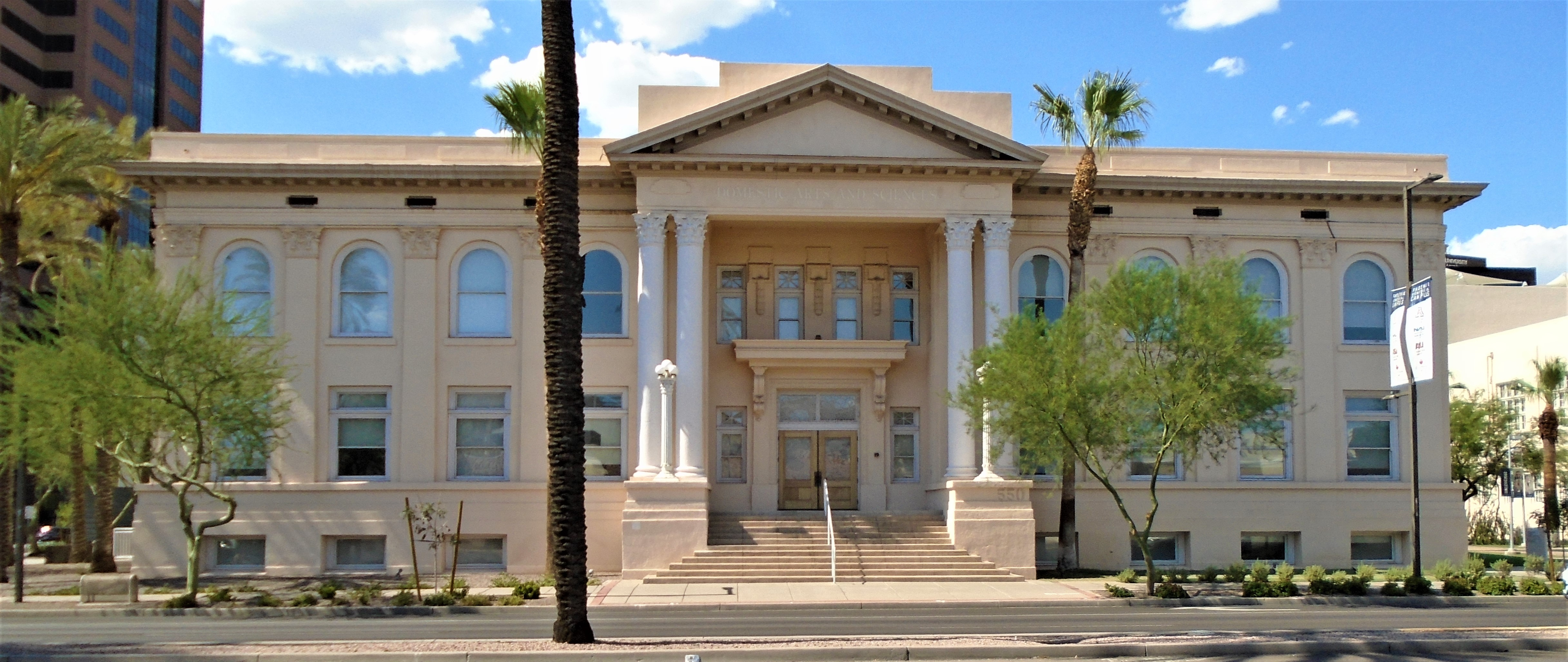
Domestic Arts and Sciences Building

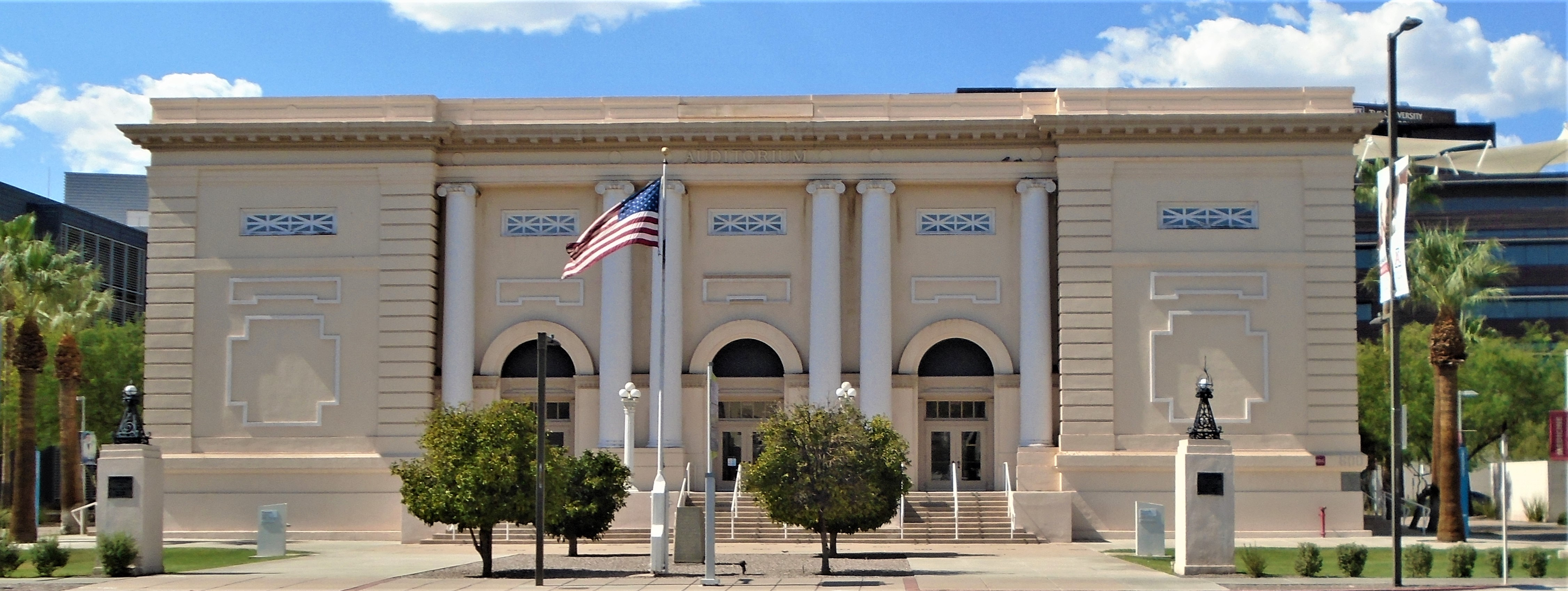
Auditorium

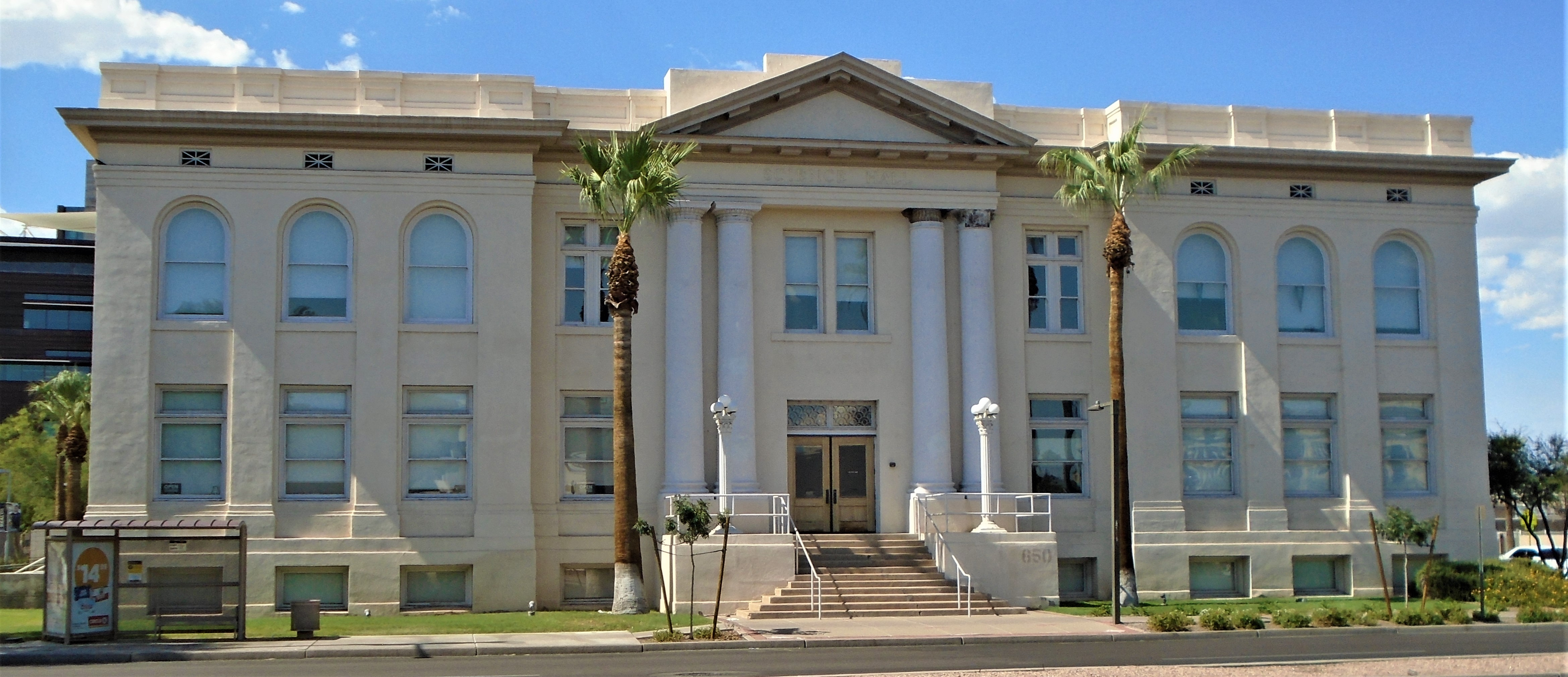
Science Hall

The school was established in 1895, before Arizona's statehood. It was, for many years, the oldest secondary school west of the Mississippi River.

When PUHS first opened, it had four classrooms and 90 students, and was located on the second floor of an elementary school.

The three original main buildings, built during 1911–12, were designed by Norman F. Marsh.

PUHS was the only high school in the Phoenix Union High School District not built for segregation purposes until 1938, when North Phoenix High School (now North High School) opened.

=== Segregation ===
For a time, PUHS was a segregated school. While segregation of elementary schools in Arizona was mandated, segregation of high schools was never required by law.

School segregation in the Phoenix Union High School District began, following anti-African American sentiments that increased after World War I. A "Department for Colored Students" was established at a rear room of PUHS's Commercial Building in 1918, with one teacher. The school's African American students were then housed in two small cottages that was separated from the PUHS campus by an irrigation ditch.

Eventually, the Phoenix Union Colored High School (later renamed George Washington Carver High School) was built on Grant Street.

School segregation persisted until 1954, a year after a judge at the Maricopa County Superior Court struck down school segregation in Phoenix high schools as unconstitutional, in the case Phillips vs. Phoenix Union High Schools and Junior College District.

Phoenix Union High School District's website makes few references to the school's segregated past, merely stating that Carver High was built to accommodate the district's African American population, and stating the school was closed, following integration.

=== Following integration ===
PUHS, along with Carl Hayden High School and South Mountain High School, took on the bulk of the school district's African American students, following the end of segregation.

The school's African American and Hispanic population increased during the 1950s and 1960s. By 1970, the school's White population fell to 19.3% of the student body, becoming a majority minority school, but the school's ethnic minorities had little say in determining and conducting education at the school. Meanwhile, violence between the school's Hispanic and African American population eventually played a large role in everyday school life, with each side blaming the other side.

In October 1970, Chicano leaders in Phoenix called for a boycott of the school, as a way to voice concerns over school security and educational quality.

=== Closure ===
PUHS, along with North High School, East High School, and West High School, closed its doors in the 1980s due to declining enrollment. North High would later reopen in 1983 as the result of a lawsuit in state court.

=== Legacy ===
Items showcasing the school's history are on display at the school's former Administration Building, now known as the Virginia G. Piper Auditorium.

== Campus ==
Phoenix voters passed a bond to purchase the Churchill Mansion near 5th Avenue and Van Buren in 1897, and convert it into the Phoenix Union High School. The school campus sits on a former residential area, bordered in part by two arterial streets, which was a factor in its selection as the site for PUHS. The school also affected later developmental patterns in the area.

The school campus was later remodeled and enlarged in 1899 and 1910, respectively. The school campus consists of nine buildings, of different architectural styles, and includes a stadium with a track and football field. The school's gymnasium, built in 1941, was noted to have a lamella wooden roof that is the only such gymnasium roof known to exist in Arizona.

Following the school's closure, portions of the school's former campus served as the site of Phoenix's municipal court, until the courts moved into a new court complex built next to the city hall. The campus now houses the University of Arizona College of Medicine-Phoenix.

=== Stadium ===
The campus served as site for the Montgomery Stadium, a multi-use stadium. The stadium with capacity for 23,000 was built in the mid-1920s and dedicated in 1927. It hosted the Salad Bowl from 1948 to 1952. Also, St. Mary's high school also used it for their home field.

== Student population ==
The school was noted for having a large student body. In 1964, 6,320 students attended the school. In 1965 alone, more than 1,000 students graduated from the school. The school's student body declined from 1964, reaching 1,129 by 1981.

== Athletics ==
The school's football team was considered to be a powerhouse in Arizona, winning 25 state championships before the school's closure, including nine consecutive state titles from 1920 to 1928.

The high number of students enrolled at the school was seen as a reason behind its dominance.

== Notable alumni ==
- Steve Colter, NBA Player, Portland Trail Blazers, Chicago Bulls, Philadelphia 76ers, Washington Bullets, Cleveland Cavaliers
- Oscar P. Austin, United States Marine, Congressional Medal of Honor recipient
- Jimmy Bryan, race car driver, 1958 Indianapolis 500 winner
- Jack Elam, film and television character actor
- Hank Leiber, Major League Baseball player
- Bill Mauldin, editorial cartoonist
- Frank Luke, World War I fighter pilot ace, Congressional Medal of Honor recipient and for whom Luke Air Force Base is named
- Dick A. Smith, diver for University of Southern California; coach for U.S. Olympic diving.
