= Garcia Elementary School =

Garcia Elementary School may refer to:

- Alfred F. Garcia Elementary School, a K-8 school in Phoenix, Arizona formerly operated by the Murphy Elementary School District
- Dr. Ernest Garcia Elementary School, Colton, California, Rialto Unified School District
- Hector P. Garcia Elementary School, Grand Prairie, Texas, Grand Prairie Independent School District
- Macario Garcia Elementary School, Houston, Texas, Houston Independent School District
- Hector P. Garcia Elementary School, Temple, Texas, Temple Independent School District
