= Betty H. Fairfax High School =

Location
- 8225 South 59th Avenue; Laveen, Arizona 85339; United States; 33°22′16″N 112°10′55″W

Information
- Type: Public secondary school
- Established: 2007; 19 years ago
- Faculty: Approx. 170
- Teaching staff: 90.20 (FTE)
- Grades: 9–12
- Enrollment: 2,014 (2024-2025)
- Student to teacher ratio: 22.33
- Colors: Midnight Blue and Columbia Blue
- Nickname: Stampede
- Website: www.pxu.org/o/bfhs

Betty H. Fairfax is a high school in the Phoenix Union High School District, Laveen, Arizona, United States. The campus is located at 8225 South 59th Avenue.

Fairfax's enrollment is about 1,678 students. It predominantly serves students from partner elementary districts Laveen and Roosevelt.

The high school was designed by DLR Group and features a small learning community curriculum model.

The school's namesake, longtime (57-year) Phoenix Union educator; Betty Harriet Fairfax, died in November 2010 at the age of 92. It was the first school in the district to be named after an employee.
