= DWL Architects =

American architectural firm

DWL Architects + Planners

Practice information
- Founders: Frederick Penn Weaver; Richard E. Drover
- Founded: 1949 (as Weaver & Drover)
- Location: Phoenix, Arizona

Significant works and honors
- Buildings: Charles Trumbull Hayden Library, Scottsdale Community College, Desert Financial Arena, Burton Barr Central Library, Mesa Arts Center, Sloan Park
- Projects: Phoenix Sky Harbor International Airport, Midwestern University

Website
- www.dwlarchitects.com

DWL Architects + Planners Inc., is an architecture and planning firm headquartered in Phoenix, Arizona. The firm was founded in 1949 by Frederick Penn Weaver and Richard E. Drover as the firm Weaver & Drover. It later became Drover, Welch & Lindlan Architects and was then shortened to DWL. The firm has designed many noteworthy buildings throughout the state of Arizona.

== History ==
Frederick Weaver and Richard Drover met while working for Edward L. Varney Associates in Phoenix. In 1949, the two left Varney's firm and established the firm of Weaver & Drover. Its early work was mostly residential, but by the mid-1950s they were designing bank buildings for a local bank Valley National Bank. Many of these bank buildings are examples of Mid Century Modern Architecture, and several are still in use today.

By the end of the decade, it had completed two student residence halls for Arizona State University. In the 1960s, it expanded its portfolio with the completion of Terminal 2 at Sky Harbor. Designed in collaboration with Lescher & Mahoney, the modernist terminal building was the start of its long standing relationship with the airport. Also, in this decade, the Arizona Title & Trust Building in Downtown Phoenix was designed. The high-rise building is said to be Phoenix's best example of the International Style. After Feed Weaver's death in 1968, Richard Drover reorganized it into Drover, Welch & Lindlan Architects, establishing the partnership of Wallace Welch and James Lindlan. In 1984, the firm's name was shortened to DWL Architects. Today, it specializes in designing aviation, higher education and healthcare projects throughout the southwestern United States.

== Selected works ==
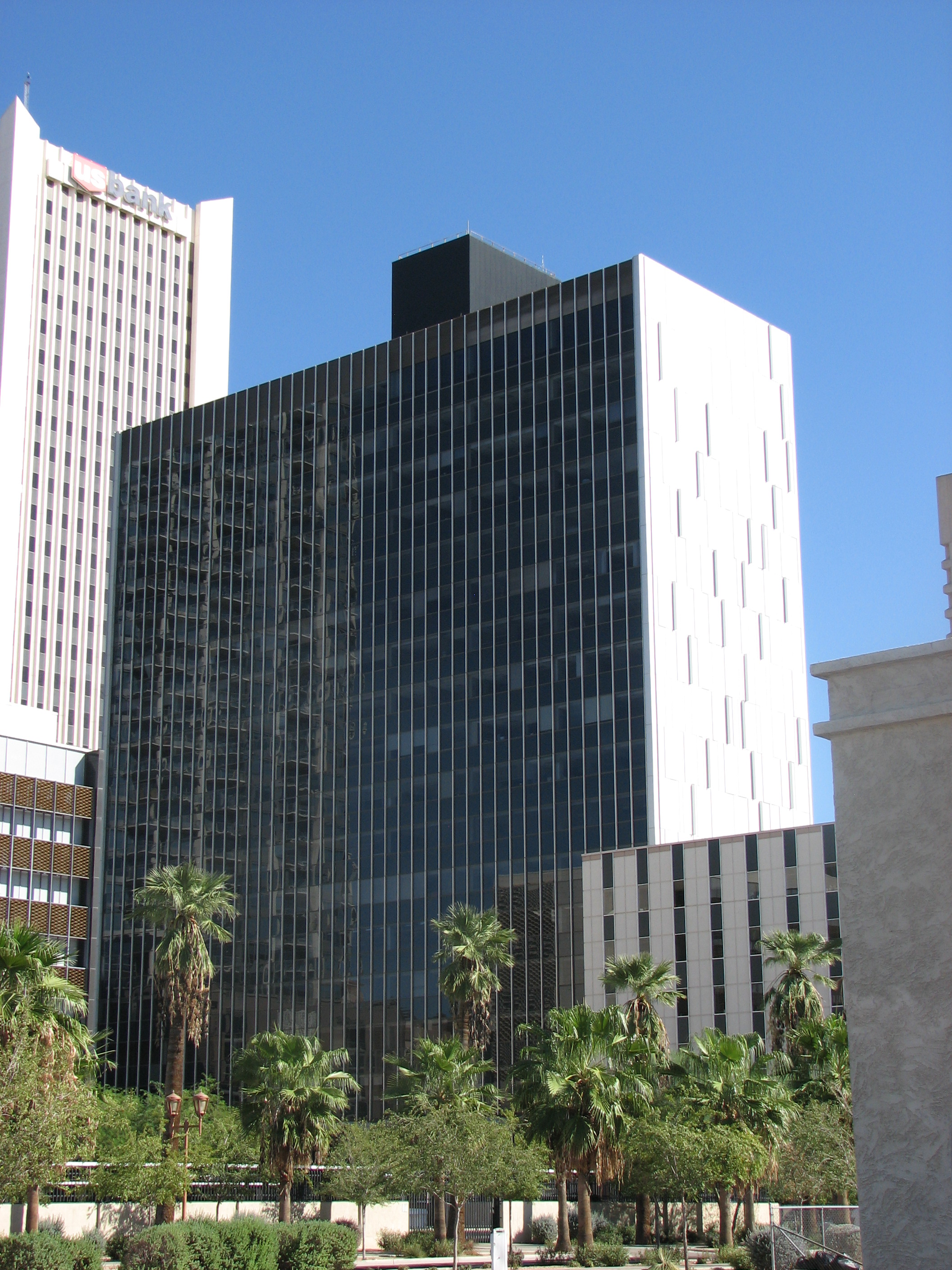
Arizona Title & Trust Building

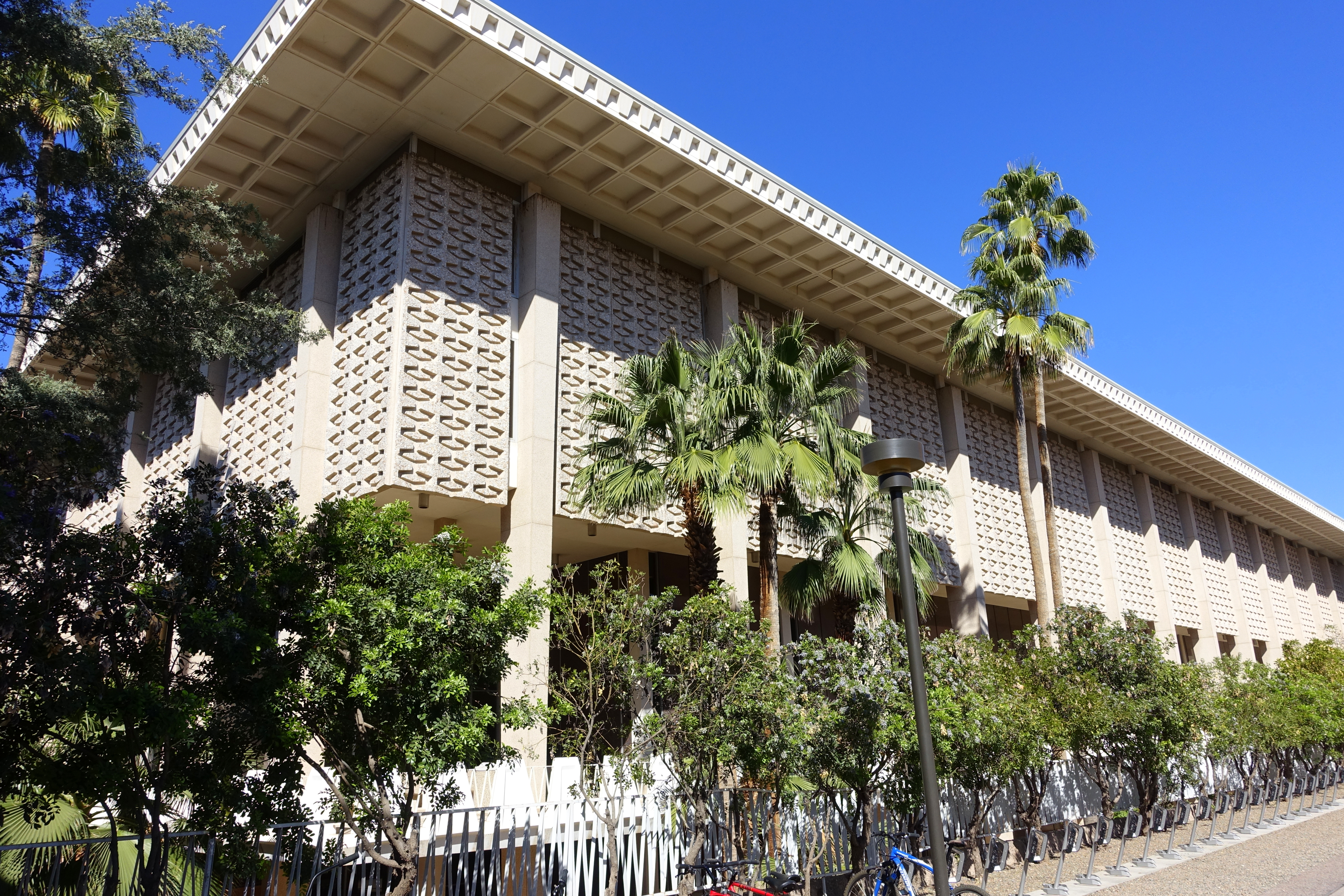
Hayden Library at ASU

As Weaver & Drover (1949-1968)

- Saint Thomas the Apostle Catholic Church, Phoenix, Arizona, 1950
- Saint Agnes Church, Phoenix, Arizona, 1953
- Valley National Bank, 1st Street and Country Club branch, Mesa, Arizona, 1954 (Demolished)
- Valley National Bank, 21st Place and Van Buren branch, Phoenix, Arizona, 1954
- South Mountain High School, Phoenix Arizona, 1954 (with H.H. Green, Lescher & Mahoney, John Sing Tang and Edward L. Varney)
- Christ Church Lutheran, Phoenix, Arizona, 1954
- Valley National Bank, 19th St. and McDowell branch, Phoenix, Arizona, 1956 (now McDowell Senior Center)
- Valley National Bank, 24th St. and Pinchot branch, Phoenix, Arizona, 1957 (now Chase Bank)
- Valley National Bank, Scottsdale and Main branch, Scottsdale, Arizona, 1959
- Valley National Bank, Tower Plaza branch, Phoenix, Arizona, 1959 (Demolished)
- Saint Thomas the Apostle Catholic Church Additions, Phoenix Arizona, 1960
- Security Center Building, Phoenix, Arizona, 1961
- Alhambra High School, Phoenix, Arizona, 1961
- Scottsdale Congregational United Church of Christ, Scottsdale, Arizona, 1961
- Terminal 2 at Sky Harbor International Airport, Phoenix, Arizona, 1961-1962 (with Lescher & Mahoney)
- Second Church of Christ Scientist, Phoenix, Arizona, 1962 (now Myanmar Grace Church)
- Maryvale High School, Phoenix, Arizona, 1963
- East High School, Phoenix, Arizona, 1964 (Demolished)
- Arizona Title & Trust Building, Phoenix, Arizona, 1964
- Charles Trumbull Hayden Library at Arizona State University, Tempe, Arizona, 1964-1966
- Valley National Bank, 56th St. and Thomas branch, Phoenix, Arizona, 1965 (now General Southwest Insurance)
- Bonanza Airlines Corporate Headquarters, Phoenix, Arizona, 1965-1966
- Valley National Bank, Cave Creek-Carefree branch, Cave Creek, Arizona, 1966 (now Chase Bank)

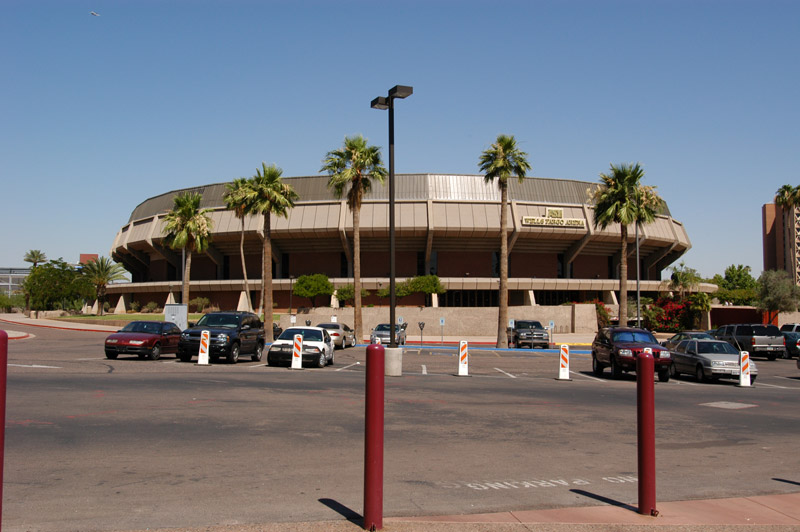
Desert Financial Arena at ASU

As Drover, Welch & Lindlan (1968-1984)

- Desert Samaritan Hospital, Mesa, Arizona, 1970-1972 (with Caudill, Rowlett & Scott) (now Banner Desert Medical Center)
- Ethington Memorial Theatre at Grand Canyon University, Phoenix, Arizona, 1971
- Desert Financial Arena at Arizona State University, Tempe, Arizona, 1972-1974
- Salt River Project Administration Building Addition, Tempe, Arizona, 1974
- Addition to Phoenix General Hospital, Phoenix, Arizona, 1974 (Demolished)
- Phoenix Zoo Orangutan Exhibit, Phoenix, Arizona, 1974
- Granite Mountain Junior High School, Prescott, Arizona, 1976
- Maryvale Samaritan Hospital, Phoenix, Arizona, 1976-1978 (now Abrazo Maryvale Campus)
- Highland Park Office Building, Scottsdale, Arizona, 1981
- Noble Library at Arizona State University, Tempe, Arizona, 1982-1983
- Valley Lutheran Hospital, Mesa, Arizona, 1982-1983 (now Banner Baywood Medical Center)
- Paradise Valley Hospital, Phoenix, Arizona, 1983 (now Abrazo Scottsdale Campus)

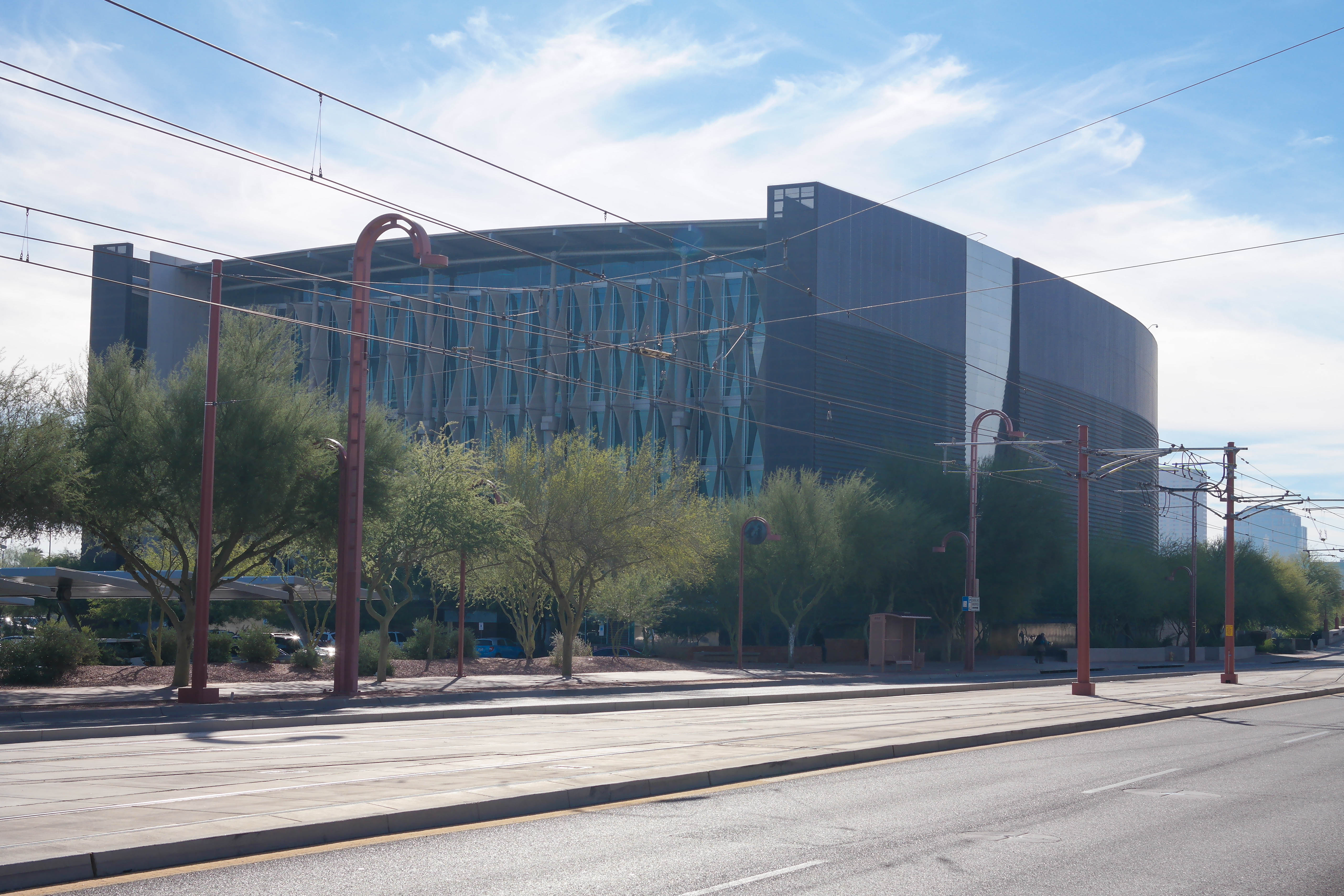
Burton Barr Central Library

As DWL Architects + Planners (1984–present)

- Music Building Expansion at Arizona State University, Tempe, Arizona, 1992 (with The Mathes Group)
- Renovation of Terminal 3 at Sky Harbor International Airport, Phoenix, Arizona, 2017-2020 (with SmithGroup, AECOM and Corgan)
- Terminal renovation at Falcon Field Airport, Mesa, Arizona, 2015
