= E. Leon Thompson =

Arizona policeman and state legislator

Member of the Arizona House of Representatives
- In office January 1, 1963 – January 1, 1983

Personal details
- Born: Elishia Leon Thompson, Sr. August 26, 1917 Albuquerque, New Mexico
- Died: May 14, 1990 (aged 72) Phoenix, Arizona
- Party: Democratic
- Spouse: Jane Thompson
- Children: 6
- Profession: Police officer, politician

Elishia Leon Thompson, Sr. (August 26, 1917 – May 14, 1990) was a policeman and state legislator from Arizona. He lived in Phoenix. He was a Democrat.

He was born in Albuquerque, New Mexico and moved to Phoenix in 1926. In 1942 he graduated from Phoenix Union High School. In 1957, while responding to a domestic disturbance call, he was stabbed three times and nearly died. He and his wife Jane had two daughters and four sons.

Thompson retired as a police officer in 1962, after serving for twenty years. That same year, he was elected to the Arizona House of Representatives. He served as a state representative for another twenty years, representing South Phoenix in Maricopa-9, then after Reynolds v. Sims the 8th, 28th, and 23rd legislative districts. From 1971-1972 he was the floor leader for the Democrats in the state house. He retired from the House in 1982.

In 1990, he died of complications from Lou Gehrig's disease.
