= Franklin Police and Fire High School =

Public high school in Phoenix, Arizona

Franklin Police & Fire High School

Location
- 1645 West McDowell Road; Phoenix, Arizona 85007; United States; 33°27′55″N 112°05′42″W

Information
- Type: Public highschool
- Established: 2007
- Teaching staff: 20.00 (FTE)
- Grades: 9-12
- Enrollment: 324 (2023-2024)
- Student to teacher ratio: 16.20
- Colors: Blue and Red
- Mascot: Thunderbird
- Accreditation: Blue Ribbon 2014
- Website: www.pxu.org/o/fpfhs

Franklin Police and Fire High School is a high school in the Phoenix Union High School District, Phoenix, Arizona, United States. The campus is located at 1645 West McDowell Road, in Phoenix, Arizona. Franklin’s enrollment is over 300 students and hosts 9-12 graders. Phoenix Union’s Franklin Police and Fire High School is the first of its kind in the nation, offering a high school education and a head start to a career in public safety. Public safety professionals teach the career classes and the school partners with the City of Phoenix, its police and fire departments, and other agencies to provide students with real world opportunities such as internships, physical training and special employment programs.

== School history ==
Franklin School was built in 1926 by the Phoenix Elementary School District. Wings were added in 1935 and 1936, and those wings were expanded to its current configuration in 1945. Designed by local architect Jay Knapp, important decorative elements included porthole gable ventilators, cast stone tablets and keystones, and a frieze-like panel with the inscription of the school name.

After Phoenix Elementary closed the school, Phoenix Union used the building to house its Desiderata Program for special needs students in the 1990s. The school fell into disrepair and stood abandoned for several years. Phoenix Union purchased it in 2004 and took on the task of bringing the school building back to life, dealing with environmental issues with the property and strict adherence to historical restoration. The part of the building from the 1920s and 1930s required hardwood flooring and custom wood windows and doors. Tiles on the roof was fabricated locally to the color and size specifications of the time period.

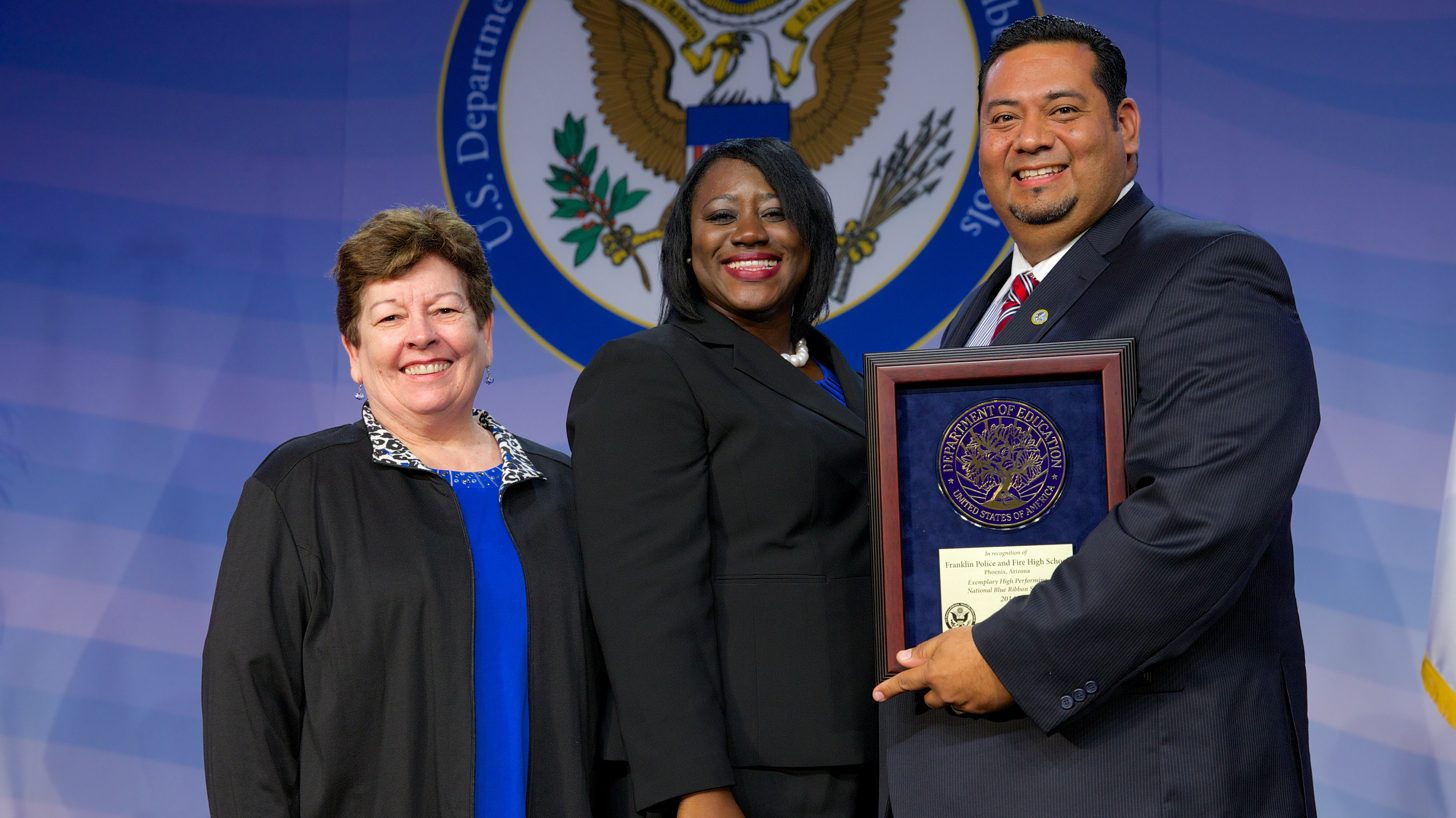
2014 National Blue Ribbon Schools Winner

== Facts ==
- Franklin features law enforcement, and firefighting science training. It is partnered with Phoenix Police Department, Phoenix Fire Department, and Bureau of Land Management for internships, career opportunities and hands-on training, including a 911 emergency operator course.
- The restored building opened in October 2007, and in 2008-09 welcomed its first 9th and 10th grade classes.
- The Franklin name came with the building, originally built in 1926, but it fits with the school's new mission. Benjamin Franklin established the first fire department in this country in Philadelphia.
- The fire science program at the school was instructed by Glendale Yucca District councilman Sam Chavira.
- Franklin was named a National Blue Ribbon School by the U.S. Department of Education in 2014
