= Terry Wright (defensive back) =

American gridiron football player (born 1964)

No. 27, 7
- Position: Defensive back

Personal information
- Born: July 17, 1964 (age 62); Phoenix, Arizona, U.S.
- Listed height: 6 ft 0 in (1.83 m)
- Listed weight: 195 lb (88 kg)

Career information
- High school: Phoenix (AZ) South Mountain
- College: Temple
- NFL draft: 1987: undrafted

Career history
- Cleveland Browns (1987)*; Indianapolis Colts (1987–1988); Oklahoma City Twisters (1990); Hamilton Tiger-Cats (1991–1994)
- * Offseason or practice squad member only

Career NFL statistics
- Fumble recoveries: 1
- Sacks: 1.5
- Stats at Pro Football Reference

Career CFL statistics
- Sacks: 6

Terry Leon Wright (born July 17, 1964) is an American former professional football player who was a defensive back for two seasons with the Indianapolis Colts of the National Football League (NFL). He first enrolled at Scottsdale Community College before transferring to played college football for the Temple Owls. Wright was also a member of the Cleveland Browns, Oklahoma City Twisters and Hamilton Tiger-Cats.

== Personal life ==
His brother Toby Wright also played in the NFL.

Wright's nephew, Javin Wright, plays in the NFL for the Tampa Bay Buccaneers.

== Early life ==
Terry Leon Wright was born on July 17, 1964, in Phoenix, Arizona. He attended South Mountain High School in Phoenix.

== College career ==
Wright first played college football for the Scottsdale Fighting Artichokes of Scottsdale Community College.

Wright then transferred to play for the Owls of Temple University. In 1986, he recorded 42 tackles, two fumbles recoveries, four interceptions and an 80-yard interception return for a touchdown.

== Professional career ==
Wright signed with the Cleveland Browns after going undrafted in the 1987 NFL draft. He was released by the Browns after summer camp.

Wright was signed by the Indianapolis Colts during the 1987 NFL players' strike and played in 13 games, starting two, for the team during the 1987 season. He played in eight games for the Colts in 1988.

Wright played for the Oklahoma City Twisters of the Minor League Football System in 1990.

Wright played in 54 games for the Hamilton Tiger-Cats from 1991 to 1994.
