= Gerald Brown (basketball) =

American basketball player

Personal information
- Born: July 28, 1975 (age 51) Los Angeles, California, U.S.
- Listed height: 6 ft 4 in (1.93 m)
- Listed weight: 210 lb (95 kg)

Career information
- High school: Carl Hayden (Phoenix, Arizona)
- College: Pepperdine (1993–1998)
- NBA draft: 1998: undrafted
- Playing career: 1998–2012
- Position: Point guard / shooting guard
- Number: 4

Career history
- 1999: Phoenix Suns
- 2000: La Crosse Bobcats
- 2000–2001: Rockford Lightning
- 2001–2002: Harlem Globetrotters
- 2002: Gary Steelheads
- 2002: Panteras de Miranda
- 2002–2003: Hapoel Jerusalem
- 2003–2004: Partizan
- 2004–2005: Alba Berlin
- 2005: Partizan
- 2006: Breogán
- 2006–2007: Fuenlabrada
- 2007–2008: Perth Wildcats
- 2008–2009: PBG Basket Poznań
- 2010: Halcones UV Xalapa
- 2010–2011: Gimnasia y Esgrima
- 2011: Arizona Scorpions
- 2011: Halcones UV Xalapa
- Stats at NBA.com
- Stats at Basketball Reference

Gerald Brown Jr. (born July 28, 1975) is an American former basketball player. He was a member of the Harlem Globetrotters.

== Basketball career ==
Brown attended Carl Hayden High School in Phoenix, Arizona.

He played college basketball at Pepperdine University from 1993 to 1998 and was a three-time All-West Coast Conference first team performer. He left Pepperdine ranking 12th on the school's all-time scoring list with 1,467 points.

After going undrafted in the 1998 NBA draft, Brown was signed as a free agent by the Phoenix Suns on January 25, 1999. In 33 games with the Suns, he averaged 2.4 points per game.

In the following years, Brown spent few seasons in Europe, playing for Hapoel Jerusalem, Partizan, Alba Berlin, Breogán and Fuenlabrada. He also played in Argentina, Australia and Mexico.

Brown coached collegiately at Arizona Christian and Concordia-Irvine before returning to Pepperdine in 2018. He was elevated to assistant coach in August 2019.
