= Linda Abril Educational Academy =

Location
- 3000 N. 19th Ave. Phoenix, Arizona 85015; 33°27′52″N 112°04′23″W

Information
- Type: Public secondary school
- Established: 2001
- Principal: Rick Beck
- Teaching staff: 15.40 (FTE)
- Grades: 11-12+
- Enrollment: 257 (2023-2024)
- Student to teacher ratio: 16.69
- Colors: Purple, Black and Yellow (formerly); Fire Red and Yellow
- Mascot: Phoenix
- Website: www.pxu.org/o/laea

Linda Abril Educational Academy (LAEA, formerly Suns-Diamondbacks Education Academy) is an alternative school that is part of the Phoenix Union High School District in Phoenix, Arizona.

== History ==
The school began operations in 2001 as the Suns-Diamondbacks Education Academy, and changed its name to Linda Abril Educational Academy in 2016. The school is named in honor of a long-serving PUHSD board member who struggled to complete high school in her youth.

The school is intended for juniors and seniors who have fallen behind on their credits, but students must have at least 10 high school credits.

== Student population ==
Racial makeup of Linda Abril Educational Academy's student body.
1. "Hispanic" (79.6%)
2. Native American (7.10%)
3. African Americans (6.20%)
4. Non-Hispanic Whites (4.00%)
5. Asian Americans (0.90%)

224 students attend the school, with 79.6% of those identified are identified as "Hispanics"

The school has a 22.7% dropout rate, and only 30.1% of students graduate after four years.

== Campus ==
The campus was originally located at 1505 North Central Avenue, in Phoenix, Arizona, United States. Suns-Diamondbacks' enrollment is 186 students. This alternative program was designed to help students (age 16-21) at risk of dropping out to complete their high school education in a small learning environment with specialized classes and schedules. Created in 2001, over 300 at risk students went from dropping out to diplomas in the school's first four years. Two new classrooms were added for an additional 40 students in August 2006. The school is partnered with Communities in Schools of Arizona, and corporate sponsors APS, Honeywell and the Arizona Diamondbacks (MLB) and Phoenix Suns (NBA) professional sports teams. For the beginning of the 2016-2017 school year. The school moved into a new facility on 19th Avenue and Thomas Road, and accommodates up to 400 students.
