= South Mountain High School =

Location
- 5401 South 7th Street; Phoenix, Arizona 85040; United States; 33°23′53″N 112°03′46″W

Information
- Type: Public secondary school
- Established: 1954; 72 years ago
- Principal: Fredrick Montoya
- Faculty: Approx. 205
- Teaching staff: 112.40 (FTE)
- Grades: 9–12
- Enrollment: 2,171 (2023–2024)
- Student to teacher ratio: 19.31
- Colors: Columbia blue and red
- Mascot: Jaguar (Rebels 1954–85)
- Website: www.pxu.org/o/tasm

South Mountain High School (The Academies at South Mountain) is a high school located in Phoenix, Arizona. The school is part of the Phoenix Union High School District.

== Overview ==
The school was founded in 1954. The school shares its name with South Mountain, which is located south of the campus.

The campus was designed by a group of noted local architects consisting of Mel Ensign as supervising architect, and H. H. Green, Lescher & Mahoney, John Sing Tang, Edward L. Varney and Weaver & Drover. The construction contract to build the school was awarded to The Wes Meyer Construction Co. The campus was heavily renovated in 2019 with ADM Group serving as architect.

The school partner's elementary district is Roosevelt.

== School boundary ==
Like all Phoenix Union High School District schools, students who live within a specific geographic area of Phoenix are automatically enrolled at South Mountain High School. As of November 2017, the school serves students in an area south of the Salt River, north of the South Mountain, east of Central Avenue, and west of 40th Street. However, open enrollment is allowed.

== Student population ==
Phoenix Union lists its overall ethnic breakdown as 81.7% Hispanic, 8.3% African American, 4.4% Caucasian, 2.4% Native American, 1.6% Asian, 1.6% Other.

== Magnet programs ==
South Mountain High School teaches five of the eleven Magnet programs in the Phoenix Union High School District.

- Aviation and Aerospace Education: The program provides students with the opportunity to attain a Private Pilot's Certificate without cost, as part of the curriculum. Since its inception, the program has produced over 400 pilots. The program also provides students with academic and hands-on training in such areas as air traffic control, airframe and power plant maintenance and pre-engineering. Students can earn college credit in the Air Traffic Control courses and build time towards their Airframe and Power Plant License. The pre-engineering courses offer students the opportunity to learn aerodynamics, power plant operation and theory, aerospace systems, and stability and control. A course in Aircraft Design is also provided. All of the courses provide students with the academic rigor necessary in the areas of mathematics and science associated with the field of aerospace.
- Law-Related Studies: The Center for Law Related Studies at South Mountain High School. This program offers the student a chance to explore career opportunities in law and law-related fields and occupations through course work and involvement with the various legal professions in the community.
- Performing Arts (Dance, Music, and Theater): The Center for Performing Arts is located at South Mountain High School. Learning situations are provided through the use of equipment, nationally and internationally recognized artists as guest teachers, field trips and community performances.
- Visual Arts: The Center for Visual Arts offers students a four-year sequenced program of study in art disciplines. Students develop their style in ceramics, computer art, drawing/painting, jewelry and fiber arts, photography or sculpture. Students exhibit their work, participate in field trips and interact with local and national professional artists.
- Communication Arts: South Mountain is one of a small number of schools in Arizona with a magnet program featuring its own radio station: KJAG 1640AM, Jaguar News. This program teaches students to operate the devises used behind the scenes in T.V.

== Athletic and competitive achievements ==
- Football – State co-champions 1958 & 1959, 1976–1977, 1993–1994.
- Girls Track and Field – First big school in Arizona to win the State Title 4 consecutive years. State Champions 2005, 2006, 2007 & 2008, 2014–2015.
- Boys Basketball State Champions 1956, 1983, 1987, 1991, 1992, 2006.
- Girls Basketball State Champions 1985, 1995, 2008, 2015–2016.
- Step Team State Champions (2007, 2008); Stepping in the Right Direction Champions, CA (2011, 2012); Stomp Wars Champions, Dallas, TX (2013); Break the Stage Champions, Atlanta, GA (2014).
- Academic Decathlon – Regional title 2008, 2012, 2013. Overall highest-scoring competitor in regional competition: Stanford Prescott (2007), Rachel Riley (2008), and Connor Wade (2012 and 2013).
- Metro Region Champions:
  - 1982 – Boys Basketball
  - 1983 – Boys Basketball
  - 1987 – Boys Basketball
  - 1990 – Boys Basketball
  - 1991 – Boys Basketball
  - 1992 – Boys Basketball
  - 2001 – Wrestling (Gabriel Willford)
  - 2001 – Wrestling (Seth Willford)
  - 2006 – Boys Basketball
  - 2005 – Girls Basketball, Girls Track and Field
  - 2006 – Girls Basketball, Boys Basketball, Girls Track & Field, Boys Track & Field
  - 2007 – Girls Basketball, Girls Softball, Girls Track & Field, Boys Track & Field, Wrestling, Football
  - 2008 – Football, Volleyball, Girls Cross Country, Girls Basketball, Girls Track & Field, Boys Track & Field
  - Soccer Division II State Champions 2015–2016

== Incidents ==
The school has seen incidents of violence over the years.

=== 1970s ===
A riot brought on by racial tensions happened at the school at some point during the 1970s.

=== 1994 ===
In October 1994, racial tensions between the school's African American and Hispanic population erupted into a riot. A report by Phoenix newspaper Arizona Republic indicated the fight involved 1,000 students, and the incident reportedly spilled into neighborhoods surrounding the school.

The incident reportedly happened in the aftermath of a shooting that injured a Hispanic senior student was a member of a Bloods gang. The suspect in the shooting was reportedly an African American Crips gang member.

No guns or knives were used during the riot, but it involved other weapons such as metal pipes and tree branches. Dozens were reportedly injured, and the incident resulted in the arrest of 18 people. School security, along with Phoenix Police Department and Arizona Department of Public Safety officers, joined forces to separate the African American and Hispanic students, and stop the riot at the school.

Overcrowding at the school was seen, at least by school officials at the time, as a cause for the incident.

=== 2009 ===
In February 2009, a riot involving up to 300 people either fighting or cheering took place, as school was letting out. A school resource officer, as well as a Phoenix Police officer, were assaulted, and in the end, 40 officers were called to subdue the riot. 12 people, including 10 juveniles and 2 adults, were arrested.

== Notable alumni ==
- Rashad Bauman, former NFL player – Washington Redskins
- Byron Evans, former NFL linebacker – Philadelphia Eagles
- Dwayne Evans, 1976 Olympic bronze medalist
- Terry Fair, former defensive back – Detroit Lions
- Manny Hendrix, former NFL cornerback – Dallas Cowboys
- Carl Johnson, former NFL player
- Steve Jordan, former NFL player – Minnesota Vikings
- Sandra Kennedy, former minority leader – Arizona State Senate
- Jason Shivers, defensive back for the New York Giants
- Bob Wallace, former NFL wide receiver – Chicago Bears
- Terry Wright, former NFL and CFL player
