= Carl Hayden High School =

Carl Hayden Community High School

Location
- 3333 West Roosevelt Street; Phoenix, Arizona 85009; United States; 33°27′27″N 112°07′56″W

Information
- Type: Public secondary school
- Established: 1957; 69 years ago
- Principal: Camilia Villarreal
- Staff: 115.00 (FTE)
- Faculty: Approx. 204
- Grades: 9-12
- Enrollment: 2,217 (2022-2023)
- Student to teacher ratio: 19.28
- Colors: Blue and Gold
- Mascot: Falcon
- Website: www.pxu.org/o/chhs

Carl T. Hayden Community High School is part of the Phoenix Union High School District. The campus is located at 3333 W. Roosevelt Street just west of downtown Phoenix, Arizona, United States. Carl Hayden's enrollment is 2,209 students, with a glaring lack of diversity (over 93 percent are Hispanic). The school predominantly serves students from partner elementary districts Isaac, Murphy and Riverside; however, students from across the district come to the school for its two Phoenix Union magnet programs: Computer Studies and Marine Science.

== History ==
Carl Hayden High School is named after Carl Hayden, a U.S. Representative and Senator who represented Arizona for 57 years, from 1912 to 1969.

The school opened in 1957 designed by the local architecture firm of Lescher & Mahoney. It was built by the Weeks Construction Co. of Phoenix. The school celebrated its 50th anniversary in 2007–2008 with the completion of a $22 million renovation and administration building. It is one of the few Phoenix Union High Schools that host two magnet programs: Computer Science and Marine Science.

== Achievements ==
- Carl Hayden was a Performing School in 2008, according to the Arizona Department of Education.
- Carl Hayden has received worldwide acclaim for its Robotics team, which won the FIRST (For Inspiration and Recognition of Science and Technology) International Chairman's award in 2008, recognized as the team that best represents a model for other teams to emulate and best embodies the purpose and goals of FIRST. The team first received recognition for beating MIT and other universities in an underwater robotics competition in 2004, a story chronicled on ABC's Nightline and in The Reader’s Digest, among others. A 2015 motion picture, Spare Parts, featured the story of these four boys: Cristian Arcega, Lorenzo Santillan, Luis Aranda, and Oscar Vasquez, whose accomplishment put Carl Hayden on the map. Carl Hayden went on to beat MIT and other elite universities the next two years. The Falcon Robotics team now hosts its own National Underwater Robotics Competition (NURC) in Chandler each June.
- Carl Hayden implemented a Pathways to Success partnership thanks to a $1.2 million grant from The Arthur M. Blank Family Foundation to community organizations that helps high school students in Phoenix prepare for post-secondary education. The high school and agencies worked together to develop in-school and out-of-school programs that support students as they progress from high school to college and career opportunities. Phoenix was one of three communities in the nation participating in the initiative.
- Hayden has also been adopted by the Maecenas Fund, which began awarding full-ride, four-year scholarship awards in 2006.

== Extracurriculars ==
- Hayden is also the home of legendary basketball coach Argie Rhymes, who won his 600th game in 2007, and has the second-most wins in Arizona among active coaches. Under his direction, Carl Hayden has won four state championships.
- Carl Hayden's last state championship came in 2026 when the varsity Super Smash Bros. Ultimate team captured the AIA State Esports Championship, marking the first-ever state esports title for Carl Hayden High School and the Phoenix Union High School District (PXU) overall.
- Carl Hayden HS Boys Soccer won the 5A AIA State Champion under Coach Abner Calderon in the 2019-2020 Season. Coach Calderon was awarded AZ NFHS coach of the year.
- Carl Hayden is the first school in the Phoenix Union High School District to reach a Boys 5A-II soccer championship game but fell in overtime to Phoenix Pinnacle 2–1. For the great season, the Head coach Abner Calderon was named coach of the year for the 5A-II Conference for the soccer section.
- Carl Hayden's boys' soccer program also won the prestigious Mustang Soccer tournament held in Dobson High School in Mesa, AZ and went undefeated throughout the tournament and only tied one game.
- The school has two award-winning publications: The Corner Stone newspaper and The Statesman yearbook. Its Junior ROTC program has been designated as an "Honor Unit of Distinction" by the U.S. Army.

== Partner Elementary Districts ==
- Isaac
- Murphy
- Riverside

== Notable alumni ==
- Gerald Brown, former NBA player
- Luis Coronel Class of 2012 - Award-winning Regional Mexican artist and singer for Del Records & Empire Productions Inc
- Art Hamilton, 1966 Class President - Youngest person ever elected to the Arizona Legislature (prior to his 25th birthday)
- Jeff Munn, Diamondbacks radio broadcaster
- Oscar Vazquez, Cristian Arcega, Lorenzo Santillan and Luis Aranda - Winners over M.I.T. in the 2004 national underwater robotics competition and the inspiration for the Spare Parts film.
- Tony Navarrete (D) - District 30 State House Representative of Arizona Representative-Elect
