= Murphy Elementary School District =

School district in Phoenix, Arizona, U.S.

Address
- 2615 West Buckeye Road Phoenix, Arizona, 85009; United States

District information
- Type: Public
- Grades: PreK–8
- NCES District ID: 0405400

Students and staff
- Students: 1,273
- Teachers: 56.0
- Staff: 83.18
- Student–teacher ratio: 22.73

Other information
- Website: www.msdaz.org

The Murphy Elementary School District 21 is an elementary school district in Phoenix, Arizona. It operates three K-8 schools and previously operated a fourth.

== History ==
The district was established on September 16, 1886. It originally used a one room schoolhouse, with its first multi-room facility, the Murphy No. 1 School, built in 1912. Initially, under Arizona law, a school district with a single school could only appoint a principal, and not a superintendent. In the 1920s Clyde J. Hinton served as principal, followed by Charles Bill. William R. Sullivan became the principal in 1940. The district gained a superintendent, Sullivan, after it opened another school in 1949. Subsequent superintendents included Dr. David M. Salopek since 1976, Dr. Alejandro Perez since 1979, and Dr. Robert I. Donofrio since 1986. Donofrio retired in 2004; he stated that the district was "well-regarded" at that time.

In 2012 Emily Gersema of The Arizona Republic stated that the district's recent history was characterized by "lagging test scores, high teacher turnover and poor leadership" amid struggles between the school board and area parents. The student population at the time was 2,200. In 2018 the population was down to 1,436. Ricardo Cano of The Arizona Republic wrote that by 2018 there was instability in the district's faculty and that superintendents tended to have short tenures; he also stated that "a large swath of parents became disillusioned with district leadership". That year the district encountered financial problems and there was a failed proposal to reduce teacher salaries by 5%. Class sizes at the elementary level increased to as high as 47 as the district ended contracts with third party entities that supplied teachers. In March of that year, Jose Diaz, the superintendent; and Richard Polanco, the president of the school board, resigned. The budget deficit in June of that year stood at $2.2 million. In June of that year all of the members of the Arizona State Board of Education voted to take control of the management of the district. In July of that year the state appointed ex-Camp Verde Unified School District superintendent Dennis Goodwin as the new superintendent.

The state asked Simon Consulting to write a report on how to solve the financial problems in the district, and in October 2018 it released the report discussing maintenance problems; mold was an issue at all four campuses. In addition the district had spent $173,000 for the curriculum it used, while it spent $500,000 for a curriculum it never used. Donofrio described the district as having severe management problems.

== Demographics ==
As of 2018 almost 60% of the students are classified as economically disadvantaged to the point where they are under the poverty line.

== Feeder patterns ==
Most students in the district are also zoned to Carl Hayden High School of the Phoenix Union High School District, and so the high school district designates Murphy as a "partner" district to Hayden. Students zoned to Arthur M. Hamilton School, meaning those in the Murphy district east of Interstate 17 and north of the Maricopa Freeway, are zoned to Central High School, also of the Phoenix Union district.

== Schools ==
All are K-8 schools:

- Arthur M. Hamilton Elementary School - It was named after Arizona state congressperson Arthur M. Hamilton, who attended Sullivan. It opened in 1954 as Murphy School No. 3. In 1986 the school board gave the school its current name.
- Jack L. Kuban Elementary School - It was named after a teacher at Sullivan Elementary who was originally a janitor before getting credentials to teach. The fourth school to be established, it was built on the recommendation of superintendent Perez with the funds coming from a $5 million approved in 1985. The school board named it in 1986.
- William R. Sullivan Elementary School - It was named after former Murphy school superintendent William R. Sullivan. It opened in 1949 as Murphy School No. 2.

Former schools

- Alfred F. Garcia Elementary School - It was named after a former president of the Murphy School District board. It was originally known as the Murphy No. 1 School, with its first building established in 1912. Circa 1968 and onward, most of its students were racial and/or ethnic minorities if Hispanics are counted as minorities. It moved into a new building in the 1970s, and the original building was razed as the district could not get the funds to maintain it for historical reasons. In 1986 the school board gave the school its final name. As of 2018 90% of the students were eligible for lunches at no cost, a sign of economic disadvantage, and of all of the students 93% were Hispanic or Latino. Circa 2018 its state accountability rating was "D". Its mascot was the wildcat and it was adjacent to an auto parts shop. In 2018 a large amount of dust lead to closures of six classrooms. In addition the school had a rodent infestation, and two students received rat bites. The district closed the school itself and made the closure permanent after determining that renovation would cost too much and that other schools had the capacity to serve the students. In fall 2019 a meeting was scheduled to determine whether the district would sell the building or keep it and lease it.

== See also ==
- List of school districts in Phoenix
