= Phoenix Biomedical Campus =

Bioscience and medical research campus

Phoenix Bioscience Core

- Location within Maricopa County
- Location: Phoenix, Arizona, United States
- Coordinates: 33.454523°N 112.066625°W
- No. of tenants: 25
- Size: 30 acres (12 ha)
- Website: biomedicalphoenix.com

The Phoenix Bioscience Core (PBC), formerly the Phoenix Biomedical Campus, is a city-owned, 30-acre (12 hectares) urban bioscience and medical education and research campus located in downtown Phoenix, Arizona. It comprises public and private academic, clinical and research organizations. It is the only site where all 3 of Arizona’s public universities (Arizona State University (ASU), Northern Arizona University (NAU), and the University of Arizona (UofA)) conduct and collaborate in research in one location.

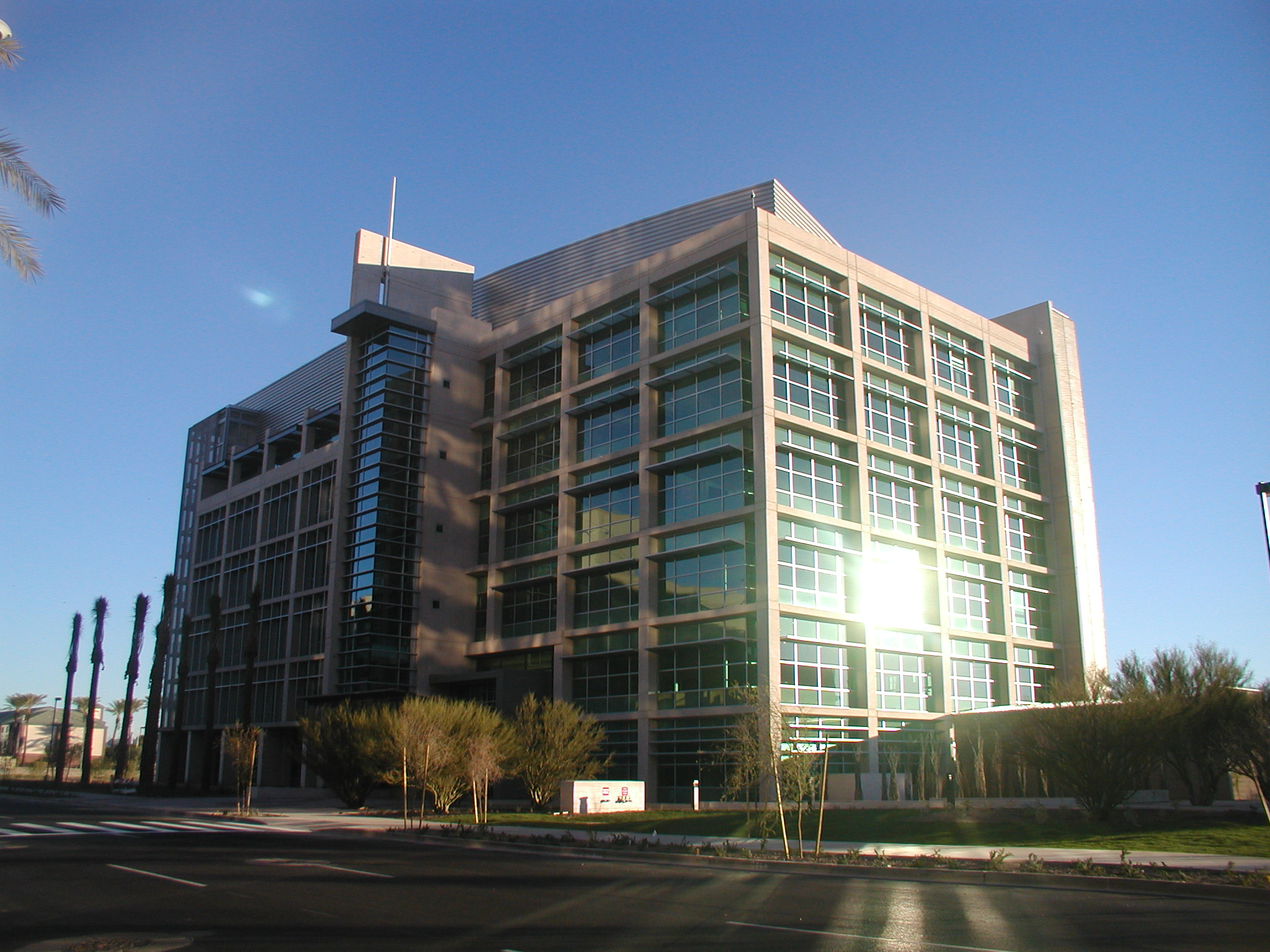
Translational Genomics Research Institute (TGen) an affiliate of the City of Hope

== Overview ==
The city-owned Phoenix Biomedical Campus (PBC) is a 30-acre, urban medical and bioscience campus with more than 1.7 million square-feet of biomedical-related research, academic, and clinical facilities with plans for more than 6 million square-feet at build out. It was established in 2004 by an initiative between City of Phoenix, Arizona State University, University of Arizona, and Arizona Board of Regents to expand medical education and research in the Phoenix metropolitan area. It is part of a broader series of medical centers, hospitals and research institutes present in the Phoenix healthcare cluster.

== Economic impact ==
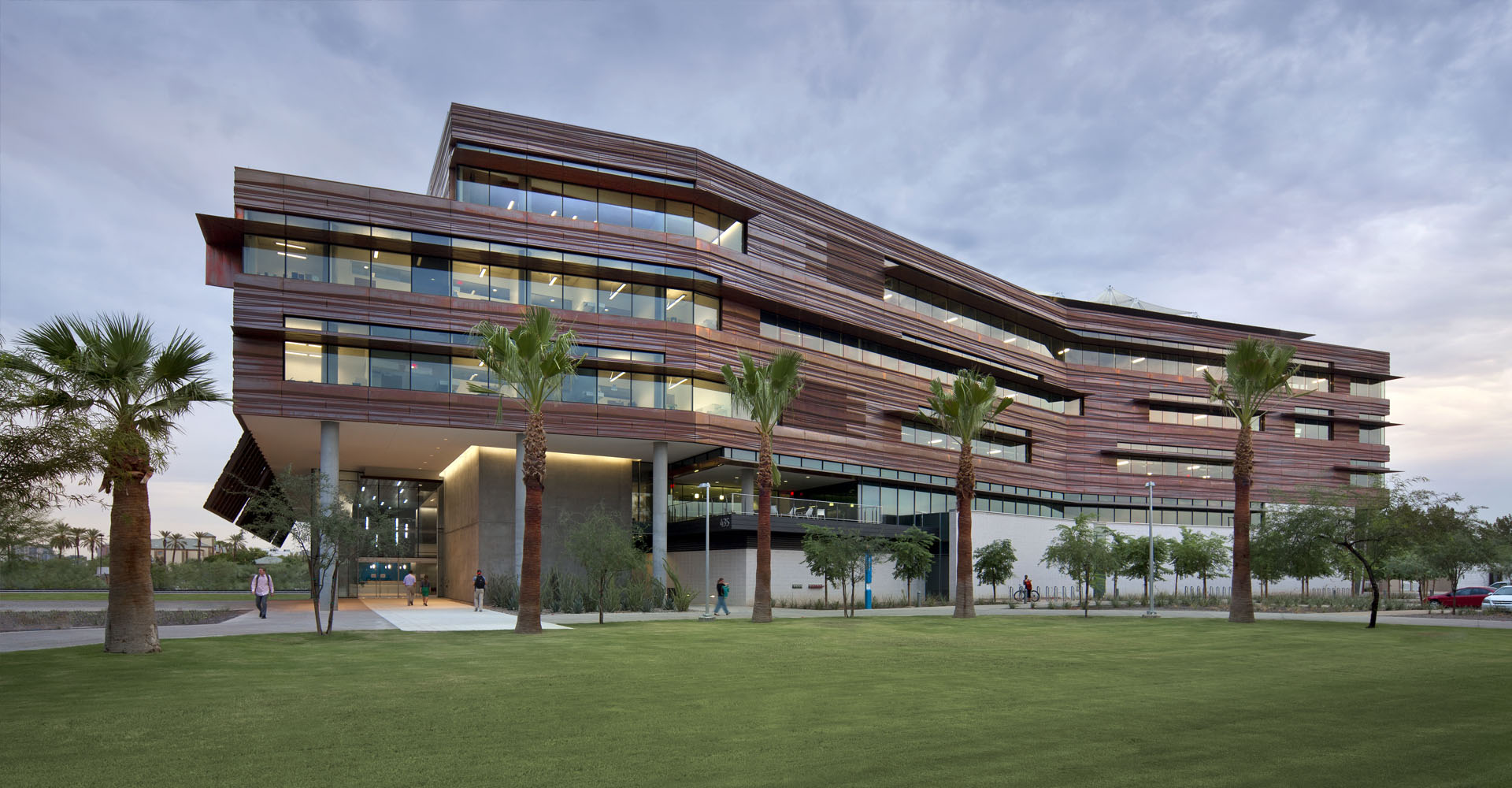
Health Sciences Education Building

According to a report by Tripp Umbach, an economic consulting firm, Phoenix Biomedical Campus had a $1.3 billion economic impact in 2013. It is projected to have an economic impact of $3.1 billion in 2025. The campus provided 9,377 jobs in 2013 and is expected to generate 22,132 jobs by 2025.

== Future developments ==
Wexford Science+Technology opened 850PBC, the 850 N 5th Street Innovation Center on the PBC in March 2021. www.850PBC.com This newest biomedical research center is anchored by expanded research of Arizona State University. The Center for Entrepreneurial Innovation (CEI) out of GateWay Community College expanded its entrepreneurial incubator services with the opening of a Validation Lab and LabForce, a unique workforce training to support certification-level training for lab technicians and other technical training required in a lab environment.

Additional new bio-innovation centers are planned for the Phoenix Biomedical Campus. There is almost 2 million square feet of facilities with planned build out at 6 million square feet.

== Present institutions ==
The following institutions all have a presences on the Campus:

- Ashion Analytics
- Arizona State University
  - College of Health Solutions
- Dignity Health
  - University of Arizona Cancer Center at Dignity Health’s St. Joseph’s
- National Institute of Diabetes and Digestive and Kidney Diseases
- Northern Arizona University
  - Athletic Training Program
  - College of Health and Human Services
  - Occupational Therapy Program
  - Physical Therapy Program
  - Physician’s Assistant Program
- Phoenix Union Bioscience High School
- University of Arizona
  - Eller College of Management
  - College of Medicine – Phoenix
  - College of Pharmacy
  - College of Public Health
  - College of Nursing
  - Telemedicine Program
- Translational Genomics Research Institute
