= Maryvale High School (Phoenix, Arizona) =

Public high school

Location
- 3415 North 59th Avenue; Phoenix, Arizona 85031; 33°29′21″N 112°11′05″W

Information
- Type: Public high school
- Established: 1963; 63 years ago
- Principal: Amarilis Granillo-Sotelo
- Staff: 131.80 (FTE)
- Faculty: Approx. 221
- Grades: 9-12
- Enrollment: 2,685 (2023–-2024)
- Student to teacher ratio: 20.37
- Colors: Black and Gold
- Mascot: Panther
- Website: www.pxu.org/o/mhs

Maryvale High School is part of the Phoenix Union High School District. The school opened in 1963 and is located at 3415 North 59th Avenue northwest of downtown Phoenix. The first graduating class was in 1964. Maryvale's enrollment is 2,861 students. The school predominantly serves students from partner elementary districts Cartwright and Isaac. Maryvale is a comprehensive high school known for maintaining the best attendance and graduation rate (91.4%) in the district. Maryvale's curriculum consists of over 60 AP and Honors sections in all academic and elective classes. Students also have the opportunity to be dual enrolled with Phoenix College earning college credit alongside their high school credit. Maryvale seniors consistently receive scholarships totaling over $1,000,000. Maryvale's staff includes six National Board Certified Teachers. Maryvale is a Performing school, according to the Arizona Department of Education.

== History ==
The School was designed by the local architecture firm of Weaver & Drover. The construction contract to build the campus was awarded to Manhattan-Dickmann Construction Co. of Phoenix.

== Notable alumni ==
- Angel Cejudo - 4-time Division 5A State Champion wrestler; Olympic wrestler for the United States
- Henry Cejudo - 2-time Colorado and 2-time Arizona State Wrestling Champion; Olympic freestyle wrestler; Gold Medalist in the 2008 Beijing Olympics at 55 kg; professional mixed martial artist, and the former flyweight champion of the UFC
- Robert James - American football linebacker for the Atlanta Falcons of the National Football League
- Darren Woodson - former American football safety for the Dallas Cowboys in the National Football League.
- Phillippi Sparks - former American football player in the National Football League
- Frank Garcia - former American football player in the National Football League
- Rob Babcock - assistant general manager with the Minnesota Timberwolves of the NBA
- John Moraga - Two-time All-American University Freestyle Wrestler; professional MMA competitor for the UFC's Flyweight Division, top-ten Flyweight fighter in the world
- Frankie Saenz - 1st 4-Time 5A Arizona Wrestling State Champion. Two-time High School All-American Wrestler; professional MMA competitor for the UFC's Bantamweight Division, top-ten Bantamweight fighter in the world
