= Bostrom High School =

Location
- 3535 North 27th Avenue; Phoenix, Arizona 85015; 33°29′18″N 112°07′00″W

Information
- Type: Public secondary school
- Established: 1976
- Principal: Robert Grant
- Teaching staff: 31.40 (FTE)
- Grades: 10–12
- Enrollment: 313 (2023-2024)
- Student to teacher ratio: 9.97
- Colors: Red and black
- Mascot: Bulldog
- Website: www.pxu.org/o/bac

Bostrom High School (also known as Bostrom Alternative Center, is an alternative high school that is part of the Phoenix Union High School District in Phoenix, Arizona.

== History ==
Bostrom High was established in 1976.

== Student population ==
The school is available for 10th, 11th, and 12th grade students who reside within the PUHSD, but some 9th grade students are also admitted, during the spring semester.

Students are selected or admitted based on an application and interview process, and parents must attend a mandatory orientation.

As of the 2016-2017 school year, there are 230 students at Bostrom. According to Arizona Department of Education figures in the 2014-2015 school year, the school's graduation rate is only 27%.
