= Phoenix Union Bioscience High School =

Bioscience High School

Location
- 512 East Pierce Street; Phoenix, Arizona; United States; 33°27′22″N 112°4′1″W

Information
- Type: Public secondary school
- Established: 2006; 20 years ago
- School district: Phoenix Union High School District
- NCES School ID: 040633002670
- Principal: Ulises Aragon
- Teaching staff: 22.00 (FTE)
- Grades: 9–12
- Enrollment: 370 (2022-2023)
- Student to teacher ratio: 16.82
- Colors: Purple and green
- Mascot: Double Helix Dragons
- Website: www.pxu.org/o/bhs/
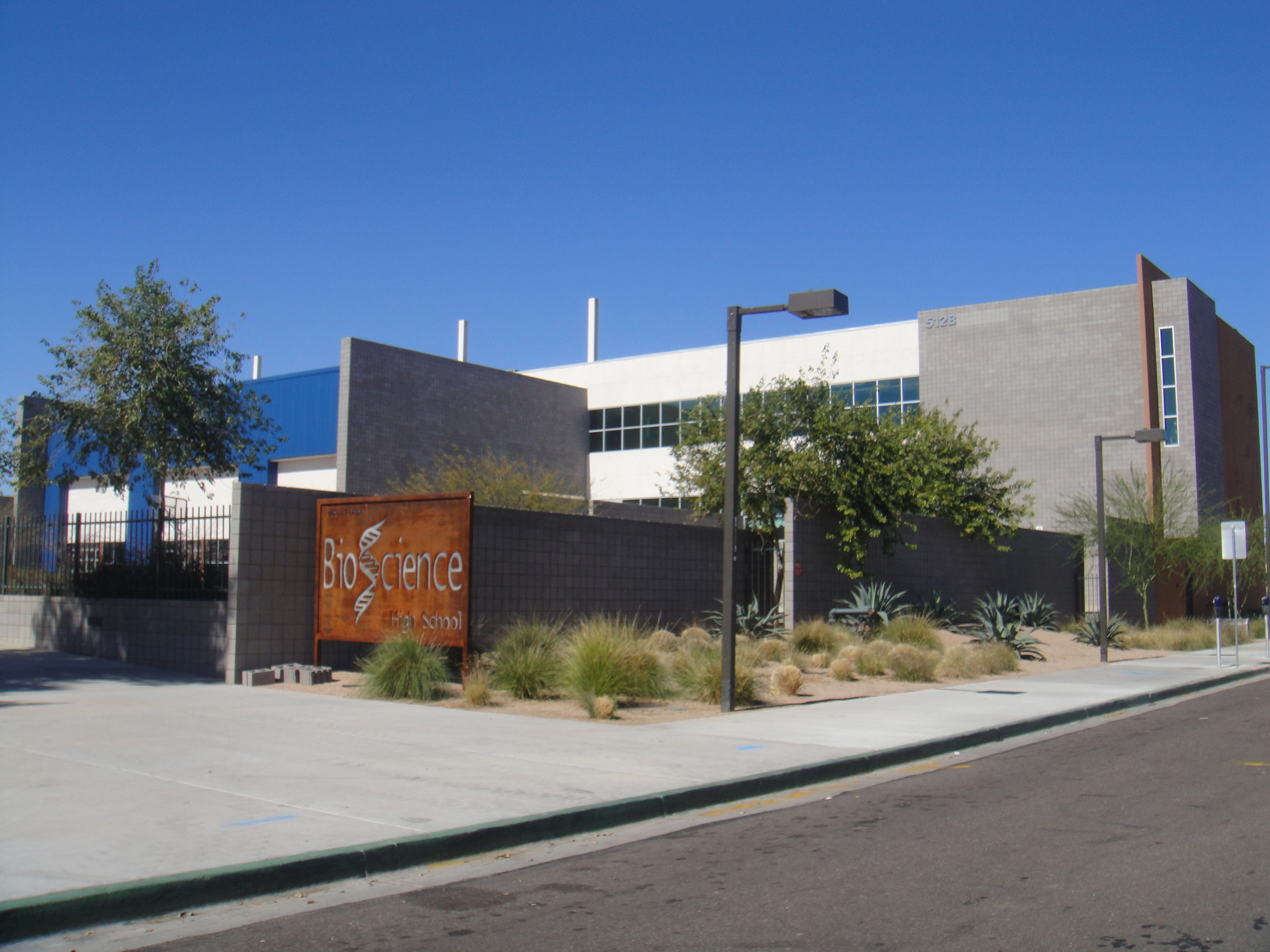
- The school campus

Phoenix Union Bioscience High School is a small magnet school within the Phoenix Union High School District and the campus is in downtown Phoenix, Arizona, US. The school specializes in preemptive science education with a concentration in engineering or biomedical studies. A new building was constructed and the existing one renovated, opening in the fall of 2007.

== Enrollment ==
Bioscience currently is home to approximately 395 students in grades 9 - 12. The student-to-faculty ratio for the 2023 to 2024 school year was 1:18, with an average class size of 1:24. The first class of 43 students graduated from Bioscience in May 2010, and the class of 2024 has the largest prospective graduation class of 103 students. 97 percent of its 10th graders passed the AIMS Math exam (in 2009), the highest public (non-charter) school percentage in the Valley, and No. 2 in the state. Their science scores were No. 3 in the state among non-charter schools.

In its first year of eligibility, Bioscience earned the maximum "Excelling" Achievement Profile from the State.

== Campus ==
The US$10 million campus which opened in October 2007 is located in Phoenix's downtown Biotechnology Center and open to students throughout the District. The Bioscience High School campus, which was designed by The Orcutt-Winslow Partnership won the American School Board Journal's Learning By Design 2009 Grand Prize Award. The school received this award for its classrooms, collaborative learning spaces, and smooth circulation.

Phoenix Union High School District received a $2.4 million small schools grant from the City of Phoenix to renovate Bioscience's existing historic McKinley building for a Bio-medical program. It includes administrative office, four classrooms, a library/community room and a student demonstration area.

In 2014, Bioscience ranked number 27 on the Best Education Degrees Web site's "Most Amazing High School Campuses In The World" list, ranked by their modern designs. The school has a solar charging station, and is partially powered by solar panels.
