= Desiderata Program =

Location
- 2920 North 34th Drive; Phoenix, Arizona 85017; United States; 33°28′54″N 112°07′57″W

Information
- Type: Public alternative high school
- Established: 1977
- NCES District ID: 0406330
- Principal: Manuel Calderon
- Faculty: 17
- Grades: 9-12
- Colors: Purple and Gray
- Mascot: Shark
- Website: Official Website

Desiderata Program (Also known as Desiderata Alternative Program, Desiderata High School, and Desi by its own students) is an alternative high school that forms part of the Phoenix Union High School District in Phoenix, Arizona.

== History ==
The program began in 1977, and its name, which means "desired things" in Latin, comes from an eponymous prose poem by Max Ehrmann.

== Students ==
Students are referred to the Desiderata Program by their home school campuses. The program caters to students with behavioral and emotional disabilities, including those with anxiety, depression, and phobias who learn better in smaller environments.

Enrollment figures are not available, but a 2015 article by Arizona Republic noted the program had about 140 students at the time.

== Campus ==
The program began operations at its new 30,000-square-foot (2,800 m^{2}) facility, located near 35th Avenue and Thomas Road, in 2006. An architecture studio was selected in 2004 to design the new space. Prior to 2006, the program operated out of a historic building that was built in the 1920s.
