= Wilson Elementary School District =

School district in Arizona, United States

Address
- 3025 East Fillmore Street Phoenix, Arizona, 85008; United States

District information
- Type: Public
- Grades: PreK–8
- NCES District ID: 0409390

Students and staff
- Students: 1,113
- Teachers: 67.0
- Staff: 76.82
- Student–teacher ratio: 16.61

Other information
- Website: www.wsd7.org

The Wilson Elementary School District is a small elementary school district in Phoenix, Arizona. It operates Wilson Primary School, K-4 and Wilson Elementary School, 5-8.
