= Balsz Elementary School District =

School district in Arizona, United States

Address
- 4825 E Roosevelt St Phoenix, Arizona; United States

District information
- Schools: 6
- NCES District ID: 0401050

Students and staff
- Students: 2092
- Teachers: 130.50 FTE

The Balsz Elementary School District #31 is a school district on the east side of Phoenix, Arizona. It also includes a portion of Scottsdale. It currently includes five schools, which are: Pat Tillman Middle School (formerly Balsz Elementary School), established as a one-room school house in 1888; Griffith Elementary School, built in 1951; David Crockett Elementary School, opened in 1955; Orangedale Early Learning Center (most recently converted from a junior high), and Brunson-Lee Elementary School, opened in 2003. As of February 2022, the school district's superintendent is George Barnes. The district feeds into Phoenix Union High School District.
