= Maricopa Freeway =

The Maricopa Freeway is one of the named principal freeways in the Phoenix metropolitan area. It consists of the following segments:

- Interstate 17 in Phoenix, from the Durango Curve to The Split (Interstate 10)
- Interstate 10, from The Split to Loop 202 in Chandler
