= Isaac Elementary School District =

School district in Arizona, United States

The Isaac Elementary School District (often Isaac School District) is one of several K-8 school districts within the city limits of Phoenix, Arizona. The attendance boundaries are Van Buren Street to the south, 51st Avenue to the west, 19th Avenue to the east, and (roughly) Thomas Road to the north, with a small portion extending north to Indian School Road and 43rd Avenue. The district operates seven K-5 schools, 1 K-8 school, and two 6-8 schools. It feeds in Phoenix Union High School District

== Schools ==
K-8 school

- Pueblo del Sol ("Town/Village of the Sun" or "People of the Sun")

Middle schools

- Isaac Middle School
- Morris K. Udall Middle School

Elementary schools

- Alta E. Butler Elementary School
- P.T. Coe Elementary School
- Esperanza Elementary School
- Mitchell Elementary School
- Moya Elementary School
- J.B. Sutton Elementary School
- Joseph Zito Elementary School

Preschool

- Bret Tarver Preschool
