= Phoenix Elementary School District =

Phoenix, Arizona, school district

Phoenix Elementary School District #1

Location
- 1817 North 7th Street; Phoenix, Arizona 85006

District information
- Type: Public
- Motto: “1st Class Education Within Reach”
- Established: 1871
- Superintendent: Dr. Deborah Gonzalez

Other information
- Website: http://phxschools.org

The Phoenix Elementary School District #1 (PESD) is a kindergarten through 8th grade school district in Phoenix, Arizona, United States. It was established in 1871 as the first free public school district in Arizona. The district boundaries cover an area from 16th Street on the east, south of Buckeye Road on the south, past 23rd Avenue on the west and Thomas Road on the north. Student services include: speech and language therapy, social and psychological services, services for the hearing and visually impaired, gifted education, and special education. Each school has a nurse or nurse's assistant on staff. Students of working parents are offered free before and after school care for their students.

Students feed into the Phoenix Union High School District.

In 2015 the district considered closing Shaw Elementary School due to a deficit of over $800,000.

As of 2024 the superintendent is Dr. Deborah Gonzalez

On March 25, 2025, the district voted to close Dunbar and Heard schools due to a budget deficit.

== Elementary schools ==
- Bethune
- Capitol
- Edison
- Emerson
- Faith North Preschool
- Garfield
- Herrera
- Kenilworth
- Lowell
- Magnet Traditional School
- Shaw Montessori
- Whittier
