= Madison Elementary School District =

Phoenix, Arizona, school district

The Madison Elementary School District is an elementary school district in Phoenix, Arizona. It operates eight schools and was founded in 1890.

== Elementary schools ==
- Camelview
- Heights
- Rose Lane
- Simis
- Traditional (K-8)

== Middle schools ==
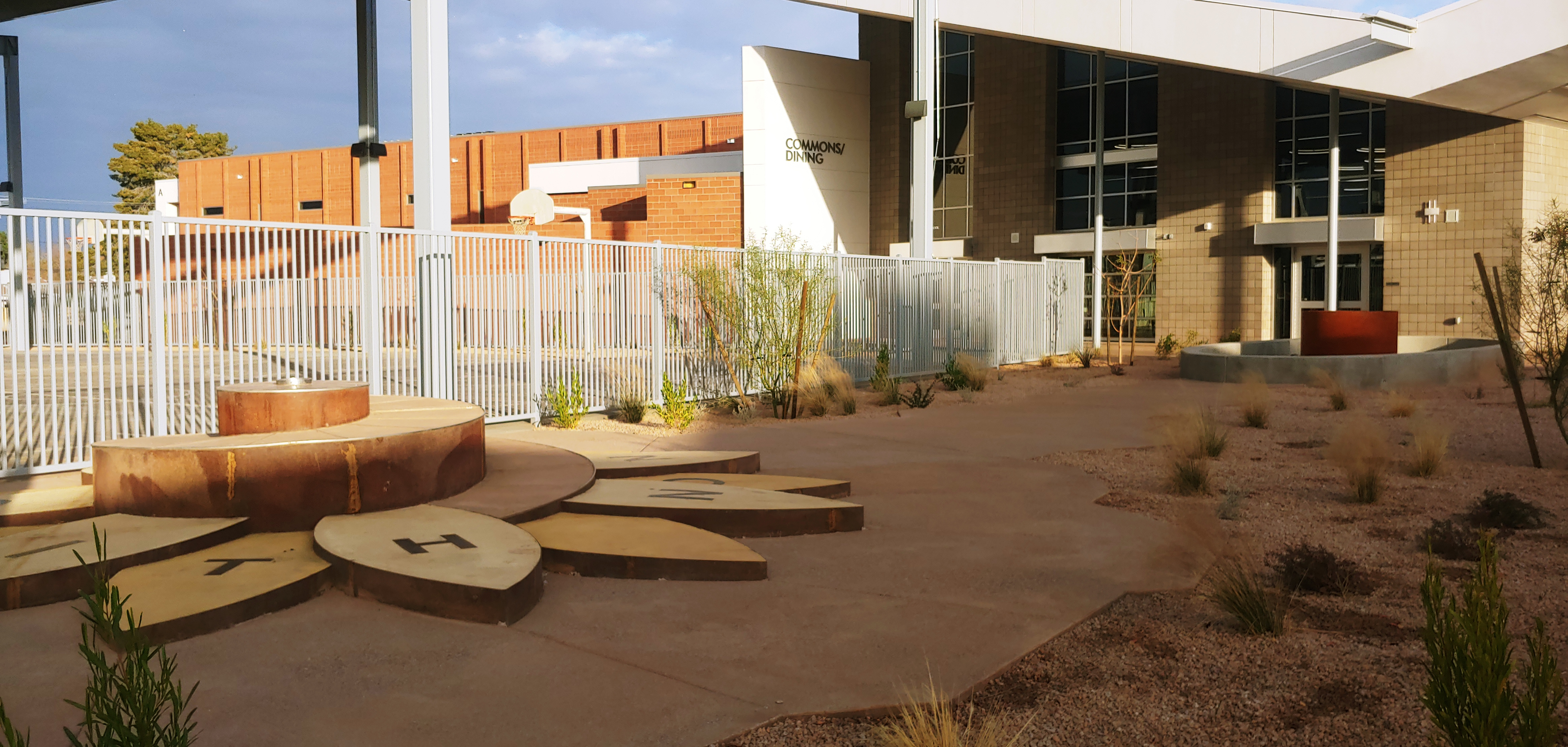
Shannon Smith Memorial at Madison Meadows Commons

- Madison No. 1
- Meadows
- Park
- Traditional (K-8)

== School of choice ==
- Madison Traditional Academy
