= Riverside Elementary School District =

School district in Phoenix, Arizona

Riverside Elementary School District #2

Location
- Phoenix, Arizona United States

District information
- Type: Elementary School District (K–8)
- Motto: Excellence in Education
- Established: 1872
- Superintendent: Dr. Jaime A. Rivera

Other information
- Website: www.resdonline.org

Riverside Elementary School District #2 is an elementary school district in the southwestern region of Phoenix, Arizona. Founded in 1872, the Riverside School District is one of the oldest school districts in Phoenix. The district has traditionally served a rural farming community with a low population density.

In recent times, new housing subdivisions have brought an influx of new residents and students to the small school district. In 2005, the district opened its first new campus since its founding. The school was named King's Ridge Preparatory Academy after a longtime board member and local dairy farmer.

The district's two schools serve over 800 students and are community gathering centers for residents. In 2009, the district hired new administration and implemented stronger teacher evaluations to increase student achievement. The board also approved a campaign to put the latest technology in the classroom, including interactive whiteboards and handheld learning tools for students.

== Schools ==
=== Riverside Traditional School ===
Riverside Traditional School campus is home to the district's kindergarten through fourth grades, as well as administrative offices and Governing Board Room. The principal is Teresa Soto. Once the only school campus in the district, the building is one of the oldest occupied school buildings in Phoenix and the emblem for the district's new logo. Thanks to a voter-approved bond, the historic campus is receiving a renovation that includes new classrooms, an administrative center, and a community resource center.

=== King's Ridge Preparatory Academy ===
King's Ridge Preparatory Academy is a new campus opened in 2005 for fifth through eighth-graders. The principal is Rochelle Elliot. The school sponsors a student council, sports booster club, leadership club, pom & cheer squads, and is starting its new boys and girls sports program.
