= John Sing Tang =

American architect (1913–1987)

- Born: 1913; Arizona
- Died: December 3, 1987 (aged 74); Phoenix, Arizona
- Occupation: Architect
- Practice: John Sing Tang AIA

John Sing Tang (1913 – December 3, 1987) was a modernist architect from Arizona. He worked in the Phoenix metropolitan area, and designed many homes in the Arcadia area in the 1950s and 1960s. He was the first Chinese-American architect licensed in Arizona. He received his degree in architecture from Rice University in 1944. Though many of his commercial works have been demolished he is still highly regarded architect in Arizona. His Helsing's Coffee Shop and Melrose Bowling Alley designs of the late 1950s are considered exceptional examples of Googie Architecture (both now demolished). Tang died in 1987 at Saint Joseph's Hospital in Phoenix at the age of 74.

== Buildings ==
Tang's works include

- 1948 F. T. Weirmusz residence, Phoenix
- c. 1950 "Party House" at 3106 N 15th Ave. Phoenix
- 1951 Better Made Potato Chips Plant, Phoenix (Demolished)
- 1951 Rancho Del Monte Subdivision, Phoenix
- 1950–1952 Sun View Estates Subdivision, Phoenix
- 1952 residence at 5960 E. Orange Blossom Ln. Phoenix
- 1950–1953 Nixson Square Subdivision, Phoenix
- 1953 Rancho Grande Subdivision, Phoenix
- c. 1953 Wellton Grammar School, Wellton
- 1953 Central and Person Shopping Center, Phoenix
- 1953 Winterhaven Subdivision, Tucson
- 1950s Pecan Grove Elementary School, Yuma
- 1950s El Rancho Motel, Yuma
- 1950s Silver Spur Motel, Yuma
- 1954 Frontier Plaza Shopping Center, Scottsdale (Demolished)
- 1955 Helsing's Coffee shop Central & Camelback, Phoenix (Demolished).
- 1956 Subdivision at 34th Ave and Glendale Ave, Phoenix
- 1957 Melrose Bowl, Phoenix (Demolished)
- 1957 Central High School, Phoenix
- 1957 Gila Vista Jr. High School, Yuma
- 1957 Palmcroft Elementary School, Yuma AZ (Additions)
- 1957 residence at 6740 E. Stallion Rd. Paradise Valley (Demolished)
- 1957 Del Monte Estates Subdivision, Phoenix
- 1956–1958 B. J. Leonard residence, Paradise Valley
- 1958 Kerns Cafeteria 1730 E. McDowell Rd. Phoenix
- 1958 Ding Ho Restaurant at 2710 E Indian School Rd, Phoenix
- 1958 Pyle Estates Subdivision, Phoenix
- 1959 Helsing's Coffee shop Central & Osborn, Phoenix (Demolished) both coffee shops were considered some of Phoenix's best examples of Googie architecture
- 1961 Phi Kappa Alpha house, Arizona State University, Tempe (Demolished)
- 1962 Conn & Candlin CPA Office, Phoenix
- 1962 Glen Mar Apartments, Phoenix
- 1963 Caribbean Apartments, Phoenix
- 1964 Arizona Land Title Building, 2200 N. Central Ave. Phoenix
- 1965 Flora M. Statler Homes, El Mirage
- 1966 Associated Grocers Warehouse Expansion, Phoenix
- 1970 State Commercial Building, 1601 W. Jefferson St. Phoenix
- 1971 State Education Building, 1535 W. Jefferson St. Phoenix
- 1974 Greenwood Memorial Park Crematory, Phoenix
