= Osborn Elementary School District =

School district in Arizona, United States

Address
- 1226 West Osborn Road Phoenix, Arizona, 85013; United States

District information
- Type: Public
- Grades: PreK–8
- NCES District ID: 0405670

Students and staff
- Students: 2,605
- Teachers: 151.76
- Staff: 212.37
- Student–teacher ratio: 17.17

Other information
- Website: www.osbornschools.org

The Osborn School District #8 is an elementary school district in Phoenix, Arizona.

The first teacher of the district, G. W. VanDerzen, received a teaching certificate in 1879. The district considers 1879 as its year of establishment. The first school building, Osborn School #1, opened in 1887.

The district has a bilingual English-Spanish program that began in 1998.

== Elementary schools ==
- Clarendon
- Encanto
- Longview
- Montecito
- Solano

== Middle school ==
- Osborn Middle School
