= Alhambra Elementary School District =

School district in Maricopa County, Arizona

- Map of Maricopa County, Arizona

Location
- 4510 North 37th Avenue, Phoenix Arizona 85019 Phoenix, Arizona, Glendale, Arizona United States of America

District information
- Type: Public
- Grades: K through 8
- Established: August 6, 1888
- Schools: Alhambra Traditional School, Andalucia Middle School, Barcelona Middle School, Carol G. Peck Elementary School, Catalina Ventura, Cordova Middle and Primary Schools, Granada East and Primary Schools, Dr. James W. Rice Primary School, Montebello School, Sevilla Primary and West school, Simpson School, Westwood Primary School

Students and staff
- Students: 14,000

Other information
- Website: www.alhambraesd.org

Alhambra Elementary School District provides education for more than 14,000 students in the Alhambra area of Phoenix, Arizona and parts of neighboring Glendale. Alhambra has 15 schools. These schools educate students from kindergarten to eighth grade. The district feeds into Phoenix Union High School District.

== History ==
The Alhambra School District was organized on August 6, 1888. The first school was a one-room brick building on Shady Lane, now known as 33rd Avenue, between Grand Avenue and Indian School Road. Today, the Alhambra Elementary School District is no longer a small school on the west side of Phoenix. They now serve over 14,000 students in preschool through eighth grades, and have 15 schools.

Most of the district is generally bounded by 19th Avenue on the east, 51st Avenue on the west, Indian School Road on the south and Bethany Home Road on the north, with some sections extending southward past Thomas Road, west to 59th Avenue and north to Glendale Avenue.

== Schools ==
=== Alhambra Traditional School ===
33.488059°N 112.139293°W
Alhambra Traditional School educates students from kindergarten to eighth grade. Alhambra Traditional School is a top-ranked school in Arizona. Alhambra Traditional is labeled as an excelling school. Alhambra Traditional's principal is Tracey Lopeman. Originally established as Westwood Traditional School in 1983, it was renamed Alhambra Traditional School in 1986. The school is located at 3736 West Osborn, Phoenix, Arizona 85019.

=== Andalucia Middle School and James W. Rice Primary School ===
33.503001°N 112.161957°W
Andalucia Middle School educates students from fourth to eighth grades. The school's principal is Mr. Raul Ruiz. The school is located at 4730 West Campbell, Phoenix, Arizona 85031.

33.50297°N 112.159447°W
James W. Rice Primary School is a 2007 A+ School. It educates students from kindergarten to third grade. The school's principal is Rosa Berrelleza. The school is located at 4530 West Campbell, Phoenix, Arizona 85031. Andalucia Primary School has now been renamed James W. Rice Primary School

=== Barcelona Elementary School ===
33.532472°N 112.154145°W
Barcelona Elementary School began educating students in 1965. BES educates students from kindergarten to eighth grades. The school's principal is Amy Bradshaw. The school is located at 6530 North 44th Avenue, Glendale, Arizona 85301. This school is also home to the *G.A.T.E program

=== Carol G. Peck Elementary School ===
33.52277°N 112.165018°W
Carol G. Peck Elementary School educates students from kindergarten to third grade. The school's principal is Melinda Schlosser. The school is located at 5810 North 49th Avenue, Glendale, Arizona 85301.

=== Catalina Ventura ===
33.53005°N 112.142209°W
Catalina Ventura is 2005 A+ School. The principal is Melissa Gonzalez. Catalina Ventura is located at 6331 North 39th Ave in Phoenix, Arizona.

=== Cordova Middle school ===
33.51928°N 112.133819°W
Cordova Middle School educates students from fourth to eighth grades. The school's principal is Dr. Sharon Spearman. The school is located at 5631 North 35th Avenue, Phoenix, Arizona 85017.

33.51928°N 112.133819°W
Cordova Primary School educates students from kindergarten to third grade. The school's principal is Pam Escobedo. The school is located at 6615 North 39th Avenue, Phoenix, Arizona 85019.

=== Granada East School and Granada Primary School ===
33.50253°N 112.125035°W
Granada East School educates students from fourth to eighth grades. The school's principal is Dr. Randy Martinez. The school is located at 3022 West Campbell, Phoenix, Arizona 85017.

33.502857°N 112.126746°W
Granada Primary School educates students from kindergarten to third grade. The school's principal is Stacy O' Rourke.. The school is located at 3232 West Campbell, Phoenix Arizona 85017.

=== Montebello School ===
33.521757°N 112.116421°W
Montebello School educates students from grades K-8. The school's principal is Nicole Durazo. The school is located at 5725 North 27th Avenue, Phoenix, AZ 85017.

=== Sevilla Primary School and Sevilla West school ===
33.516057°N 112.14229°W
Sevilla Primary School educates students from grades K-4. The school is a 2007 A+ school. The school's principal is Mandi Bilyou. Sevilla Primary School is located at 3801 West Missouri, Phoenix, Arizona 85019.

33.516123°N 112.141463°W
Sevilla West School educates students from grades 5-8. The school's principal is Ms. Jennifer Brunch. The school is a 2008 A+ school. Sevilla West was chosen most of the time by district for special events for the district since Sevilla West has the largest multipurpose room in the district. Sevilla West School is located at 3851 West Missouri, Phoenix, Arizona 85019.

=== R. E. Simpson School ===
33.51531°N 112.108662°W
(R. E.) Simpson School educates students from grades 4-8. The principal is Alana Ragland. Principal Ragland is a RODEL Principal and recognized as a leader of educational equity. The school is located at 5330 North 23rd Avenue, Phoenix, Arizona 85015. During the tenor of Principal Ragland, Simpson emerged from its failing status to letter grade C within a three year trajectory. Simpson under the leadership of Alana Ragland became a Verizon Innovation School in 2019. Simpson was a trailblazer of STEAM with multiple opportunities for students to involve themselves in College and Career Technology experiences through Paxton Patterson (https://www.paxtonpatterson.com/), AVID and VILS.

=== Westwood Primary School ===
33.506577°N 112.10803°W
Westwood Primary School educates students from grades K-3. The principal is Mrs. Melissa McKinsey. The school is a 2006 A+ school. This is the site that housed the district's first back to basics school in 1983, it was later returned to a neighborhood school and the district traditional school relocated to the current Alhambra location. The school is located at 4711 North 23rd Avenue, Phoenix, Arizona 85015.
