= East High School (Arizona) =

Former school in Maricopa County, Arizona

Coordinates: 33°27′16″N 111°58′38″W

- Phoenix, Arizona

Information
- Type: Public secondary school
- Established: 1964
- Closed: 1982
- Grades: 9–12
- Enrollment: 1,251 (1982)
- Mascot: Longhorns

East High School was a high school in Phoenix, Arizona, and was part of the Phoenix Union High School District.

== History ==
The school was designed by the noted local architecture firm of Weaver & Drover.

Enrollment peaked in 1975, when 2,561 students attended the school.

Phoenix Union High School District board members voted to close the school in November 1981, due to declining enrollments that has caused financial problems for the district. Parents then filed a lawsuit in an effort to keep the school open.

== Student population ==
At the time of the school's closure, the school was noted by an article in The Arizona Republic to have an almost evenly divided enrollment of African Americans, "Hispanics", and White Americans.

== Athletics ==
The school's basketball program was considered to be a giant among the state's boys' basketball teams from 1969 to 1982, winning five big-schools state championships, one runner-up, two semifinals and five quarterfinals teams, under coach Royce Youree.
