= Creighton Elementary School District =

School district in Phoenix, Arizona

Creighton Elementary School District is a K–8 school district based in Phoenix, Arizona, United States.

Founded in 1884, the boundaries of Creighton Elementary School District lie within East-Central Phoenix and a section of Paradise Valley. Its main office is located at 2702 East Flower Street, Phoenix, AZ 85016.

As of 2012, most of the students speak Spanish and come from low-income households. As of that year, there was a high crime level in areas of the district.

In 2013, the Creighton Community Foundation was created to support the community served by the district. The foundation's office is located on the campus of The Larry C Kennedy Elementary School.

== Schools ==
- Biltmore Preparatory Academy
- The Creighton Academy
- Excelencia School Center
- Gateway Elementary School
- Larry C. Kennedy Elementary School
- Loma Linda Elementary School
- William T. Machan Elementary School
- Monte Vista Elementary School
- Iron Mountain Academy

=== Biltmore Preparatory Academy ===
Biltmore Preparatory Academy is part of the Creighton Elementary School District. The campus is located at 4601 N. 34th Street, Phoenix, Arizona, United States. The school was previously known as Squaw Peak Traditional Academy. The name was changed to Biltmore Preparatory Academy in 2011. A remodel project was started during the 2018 school year and completed the summer of 2019. The primary focus of the remodel was the middle school section and the parking lot.

==== Spanish Language Immersion ====
Biltmore Preparatory Academy offers a Spanish language immersion program for its students. Students learn math and science in Spanish. The balance of their day is in English.

==== Preschools ====
There are two preschools on campus. Covenant Child Care Center and Little Big Minds offer preschool and aftercare programs. Little Big Minds is a Spanish language immersion preschool.

=== Gateway Elementary School ===
Gateway Elementary School is part of the Creighton Elementary School District. The campus is located at 1100 North 35th Street. Phoenix, Arizona, United States. Gateway's enrollment is 850 students. The school is a Reading First school, and hosts a 21st Century Community Learning Center.

== Sports ==
- Boys basketball
- Girls basketball
- Co-Ed football
- Co-Ed volleyball
- Girls cheerleading
- Co-Ed softball
