= Fairfax (name) =

Fairfax is both a surname of English (Yorkshire and Northumberland, with a few branches later settling in Scotland) origin which means "fair hair", and a unisex given name. Notable people with the name include:

Surname:

- Alan Fairfax (1906–1955), Australian cricketer
- Betty Fairfax (1918–2010), American educator, counselor, and philanthropist
- Cerina Fairfax (1977–2026), American dentist and Second Lady of Virginia
- Daphne Fairfax, British comedian
- Edward Fairfax (c. 1580–1635), English translator
- Henry Fairfax (Royal Navy officer) (1837–1900), British Admiral and Naval Commander K.C.B., F.R.G.S.,
- James Fairfax (1933–2017), Australian businessman and philanthropist
- Jean E. Fairfax (1920–2019), American educator, civil rights worker, community organizer, and philanthropist
- John Fairfax (disambiguation), name of several notable people

- John Fairfax (delegate) (1762–1843), manager for George Washington
- John Fairfax (minister) (1623–1700), English ejected minister
- John Fairfax, 11th Lord Fairfax of Cameron (1830–1900), British peer with American citizenship
- John Fairfax (poet) (1930–2009), English poet
- John Fairfax (rower) (1937–2012), British ocean rower and adventurer

- Justin Fairfax (1979–2026), American lawyer and politician, Lieutenant Governor of Virginia (2018–2022)
- Lance Fairfax (1894–1974), New Zealand baritone in Australia
- Lettice Fairfax (1876–1948)
- Michael Fairfax (born 1953), English sculptor
- Nathaniel Fairfax (1637–1690), English divine and physician
- Robert Fairfax (disambiguation), several people:

- Robert Fairfax, 7th Lord Fairfax of Cameron (1707–1793)
- Robert Fairfax (Royal Navy officer) (1666–1725)
- Robert Fayrfax (1464–1521), English Renaissance composer

- Ruth Fairfax (1878–1948), first president of the Queensland Country Women's Association
- Russell Fairfax (born 1952), Australian rugby league footballer
- Thomas Fairfax (1612–1671), 3rd Lord Fairfax of Cameron, parliamentarian general in the English Civil War
- Thomas Fairfax (d. 1520) (c. 1475–1520), 16th-century owner of Gilling Castle, North Yorkshire
- Warwick Oswald Fairfax, (1901–1987), Australian businessman, journalist and playwright
- Warwick Fairfax (born 1960), Australian businessman, son of W. O. Fairfax
- William Fairfax (1691–1757), 18th-century colonial official and plantation owner in Virginia
- William George Fairfax (1739–1813), a vice-admiral in the Royal Navy
- Lord Fairfax of Cameron (multiple individuals), a title in the Peerage of Scotland
- Viscount Fairfax of Emley (multiple individuals), a title in the Peerage of Ireland

Given name:

- Fairfax M. Cone (1903–1977), American businessman
- Fairfax Downey (1893–1990), American writer and military historian
- Fairfax Fenwick (1852–1920), New Zealand cricketer
- Fairfax Harrison (1869–1938), American president of Southern Railway and author
- Sir Fairfax Moresby (1786–1877), Royal Navy officer

Fictional characters:

- Gavin Fairfax, a character played by John D. Collins on the British sitcom series 'Allo 'Allo!
- Colonel Fairfax, a character in the Gilbert and Sullivan comic opera The Yeomen of the Guard.
- Mrs. Fairfax, a character in Charlotte Brontë's novel Jane Eyre
- Jane Fairfax, a character in Jane Austen's novel Emma
- Gwendolyn Fairfax, a character in Oscar Wilde's play The Importance of Being Earnest
- Abigail Fairfax, a character from the 2022 adventure comedy film The Lost City, who is an egotistical, eccentric billionaire seeking to find the treasure of the eponymous lost city.

== See also ==
- Fairfax (disambiguation)
