= Fairfax =

Fairfax may refer to:

== Places ==
=== United States ===
- Fairfax, California
- Fairfax Avenue, a major thoroughfare in Los Angeles, California
- Fairfax District, Los Angeles, California, centered on Fairfax Avenue
- Fairfax, Georgia
- Fairfax, Iowa
- Fairfax District (Kansas City, Kansas), an industrial area
- Fairfax, Minnesota
- Fairfax, Missouri
- Fairfax, Ohio, a village in Hamilton County
- Fairfax, Cleveland, Ohio, a neighborhood
- Fairfax, Highland County, Ohio
- Fairfax, Oklahoma
- Fairfax, South Carolina
- Fairfax, South Dakota
- Fairfax, Vermont, a New England town
  - Fairfax (CDP), Vermont, the main village in the town
- Fairfax, Virginia, an independent city
- Fairfax County, Virginia, surrounding the city of Fairfax
- Fairfax Station, Virginia
- Fairfax, West Virginia
- Fairfax Stone Historical Monument State Park, West Virginia

=== Elsewhere ===
- Division of Fairfax, an electoral district in the Australian House of Representatives, in Queensland
- Fairfax, New Zealand, a town in the Southland region

== People ==
- Fairfax (name)
- Lord Fairfax of Cameron
- Viscount Fairfax of Emley

== Other uses ==
- Fairfax Academy, a secondary school in Sutton Coldfield, England
- Fairfax (White Pine, Tennessee), a mansion on the US National Register of Historic Places
- Fairfax University, a former unaccredited distance-learning institution
- University of Fairfax, an institution of higher education headquartered in Salem, Virginia
- Hellespont Fairfax, the largest double-hulled supertanker
- Fairfax Media, a defunct Australian-based media company focusing on newspapers
- Fairfax Financial, a Canadian-based financial services holding company
- General Motors Fairfax Assembly Plant, Kansas City, Kansas
- Fairfax House, a Georgian town-house, now a museum, in York, England
- Fairfax Christian School, a Christian school in Vienna, Virginia
- Fairfax (TV series), a 2021 animation TV show
- English ship Fairfax (1650), an English frigate, destroyed by fire in 1653
- English ship Fairfax (1653), an English frigate built to replace the 1650 ship of the same name

== See also ==
- Fairfax High School (disambiguation)
