= Pieter Peutemans =

Dutch painter

Pieter Peutemans (1641–1698) was a Dutch Golden Age painter.

According to the Netherlands Institute for Art History, Peutemans was born in Goes and, according to Arnold Houbraken, he died of the shock to his heart that he experienced during the Rotterdam earthquake of September 18, 1692. He had been in the Rotterdam anatomy building after lunch, to draw some anatomical pieces for his cousin, a member of the Rotterdam 'vroedschap' (council). The earthquake caused all of the skeletons in the room to shake and he felt the skulls laughing at him, whereupon he jumped up and ran in terror, covered in ground paint. He fainted and, though he recovered enough to relate the story, he died soon afterwards. Houbraken also mentioned some painted cutout signboards he made, and mentioned specifically a cutout of a lifesize Swiss guard officer who stood guard at his home in Rotterdam.

According to the RKD he worked at Goes and in The Hague before moving to Middelburg, where he married and became a member of their Guild of Saint Luke there. He is known for some schutterstukken in Goes that were auctioned by that town in 1864.
