= Falcon Lodge =

Area of Sutton Coldfield, Birmingham, England

Coordinates: 52.56345°N 1.79343°W

Falcon Lodge (SP 141 962) is the area of Sutton Coldfield, Birmingham, West Midlands, England, covered in predominantly council houses forming the Falcon Lodge Estate. It is located between Whitehouse Common and Reddicap Heath. To the west of the estate lies Rectory Park. It forms part of the edge of the Sutton Coldfield conurbation and the English countryside.

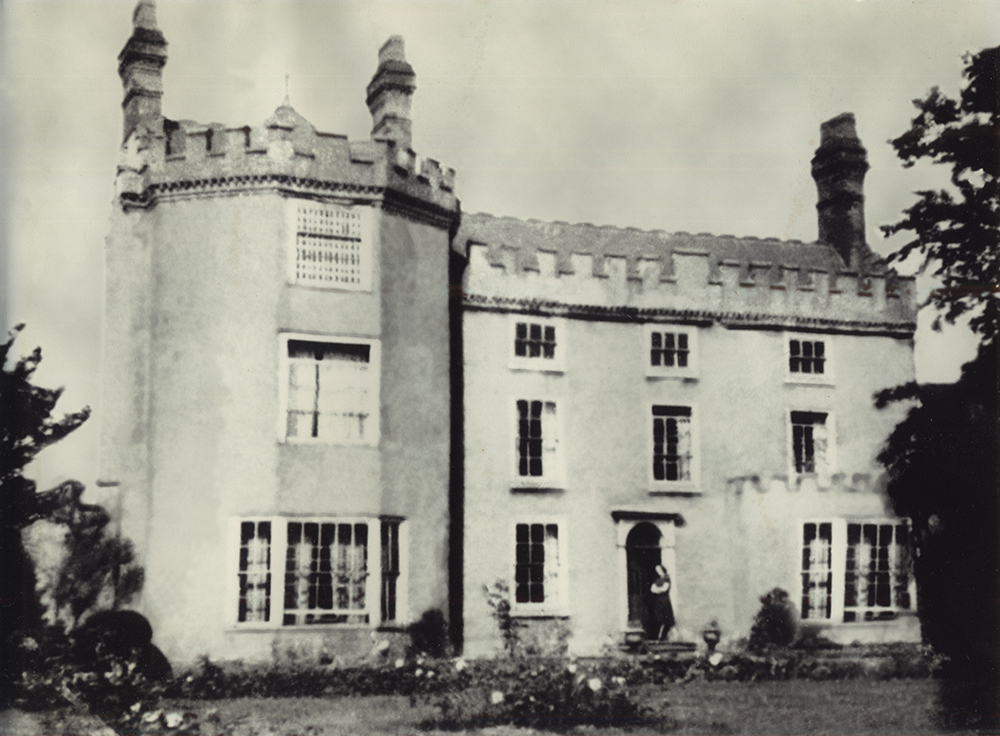
FALCON LODGE HOUSE with Annie Smith standing in the doorway

The estate takes its name from the house built on newly enclosed common land in 1820. In 1852 the estate comprised some 54 acres (22 ha) of meadow, pasture and arable land. In 1937 the Sutton Coldfield Corporation acquired the house and land for £39,500 for the provision of local authority housing. The resultant Falcon Lodge estate was built between 1948-1956, with the original house still standing and occupied by a family of tenants, including Annie Smith, until 1954.

There are two secondary schools opposite each other: John Willmott School and Fairfax Academy. The road (Fairfax Road) on which Fairfax School lies acts as the border of the estate. There is also a primary school called Newhall (formerly Springfield School) and Langley School on Lindridge Road (a special education school). This was demolished in 2010. Woodington Infants School, just off Woodington Road was demolished in 2007/2008.

The estate and surrounding area is served by several local Christian churches including St Chads (Anglican) on Hollyfield Road; Falcon Lodge Methodist Church on Newdigate Road; Falcon Lodge Chapel(Evangelical), Reddicap Heath Road; Holy Cross and St Francis (Catholic), Springfield Road. Sutton Christian Centre(Pentecostal) uses Falcon Lodge Community Centre for their main meetings and Falcon Lodge Chapel for their youth activities. Other denominations are represented with Jehovah's Witnesses Kingdom Hall in Springfield Road and the Seventh Day Adventist Church meet at Falcon Lodge Community Centre. Second Thoughts is a church-sponsored community shop and information centre operating from shop premises on Churchill Parade.

The estate is split by a small stream, Churchill Brook, along which Churchill Road is situated. This road is the main route used by National Express West Midlands buses travelling through the estate. The stream flows into Langley Brook, a tributary of the River Tame, whose waters flow, via the River Trent and the Humber, into the North Sea.

The Falcon Lodge area is served by the Sutton Reddicap electoral ward. The area has a row of shops running along Churchill Road and a community centre, offering classes and activities for young and old. There is also an intergenerational community music programme, Live In The Lodge, which runs throughout the year for local residents and school children, featuring a community choir, weekly instrumental classes and workshops, and professional guest performances in the Community Centre.
