= 1692 Northwestern Europe earthquake =

Earthquake

1692 Ardennes earthquake
- Location within Belgium
- Local date: 18 September 1692
- Local time: 14:00-15:00 WET
- Magnitude: 6.0–6.5 M_{s}
- Epicenter: 50.61°N 5.825°E
- Areas affected: Modern-day Belgium, France, Netherlands, Germany, England
- Max. intensity: MMI VII (Very strong)-MMI VIII (Severe)

The 1692 Verviers earthquake, also known as the 1692 Ardennes earthquake, occurred in the east of Belgium on 18 September 1692 measuring around 6.2 on the Richter scale. Parish records and historical accounts strongly indicate the earthquake's epicenter was northwest of Verviers, and the event was widely felt across Western Europe in modern-day Belgium, England, Germany, the Netherlands, Luxembourg, and France. The largest amount of damage occurred in the northwestern environs of Verviers, then part of the Prince-Bishopric of Liège. Researchers at the Royal Observatory of Belgium have considered this the strongest known earthquake in Western Europe north of the Alps, which occurred as part of a sequence of quakes from the Lower Rhine Graben in September 1692.

== Earthquake ==
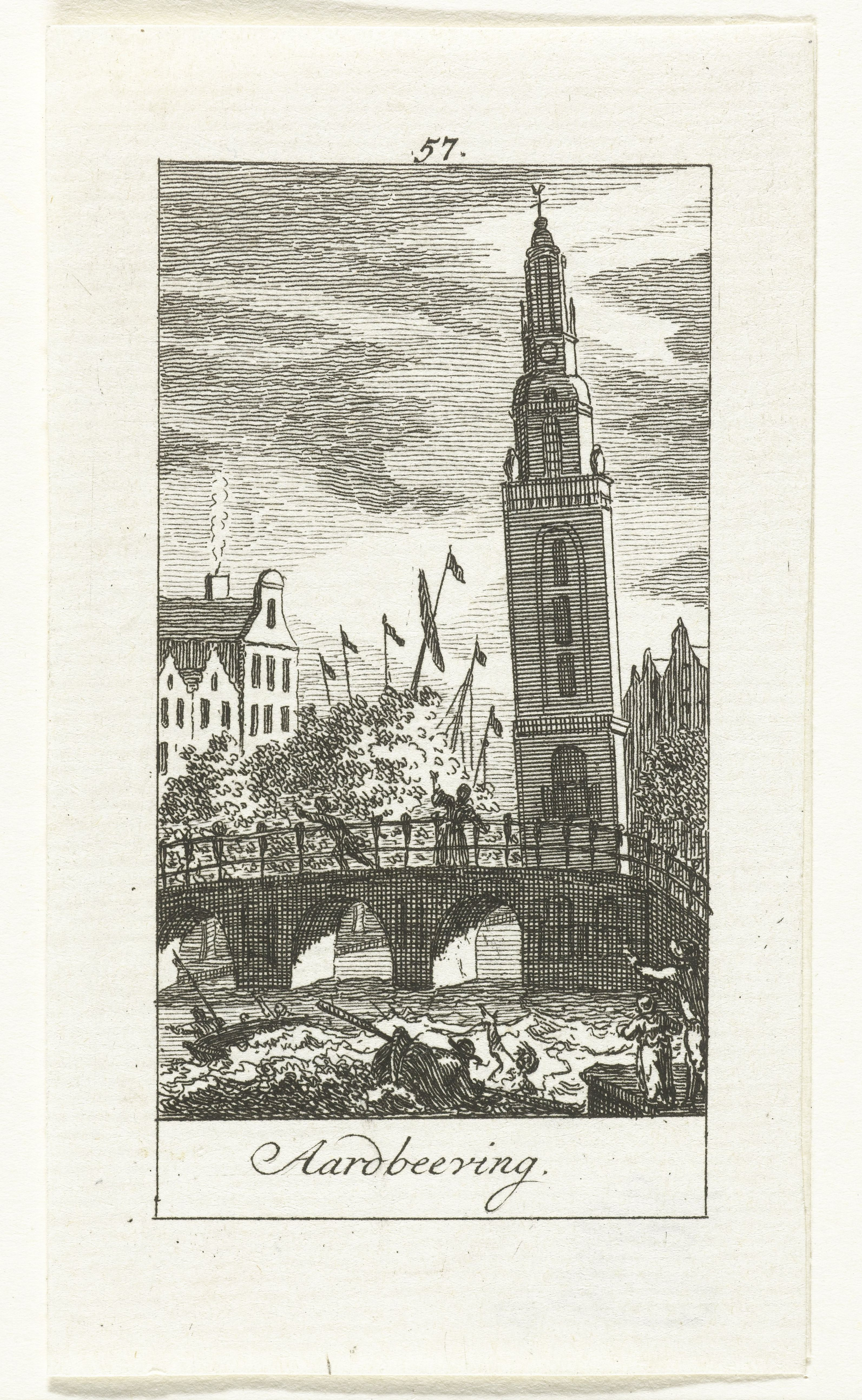
"Aardbeeving" by Simon Fokke.

Contemporaneous accounts of the earthquake and its destruction across Belgium and other countries enable scientists to approximate its epicenter, magnitude, and intensity as it spread outwards. During a Thursday afternoon between 14:00 and 15:00, the hills just northwest of Verviers were suddenly struck by destructive-level shaking. The villages of Soiron, Herve, Ensival, and Walhorn were closest to the epicenter and accounts of "extensive" to "complete" destruction of houses in Soiron demonstrate an earthquake intensity of VIII (Severe) on the Modified Mercalli intensity scale for the area.

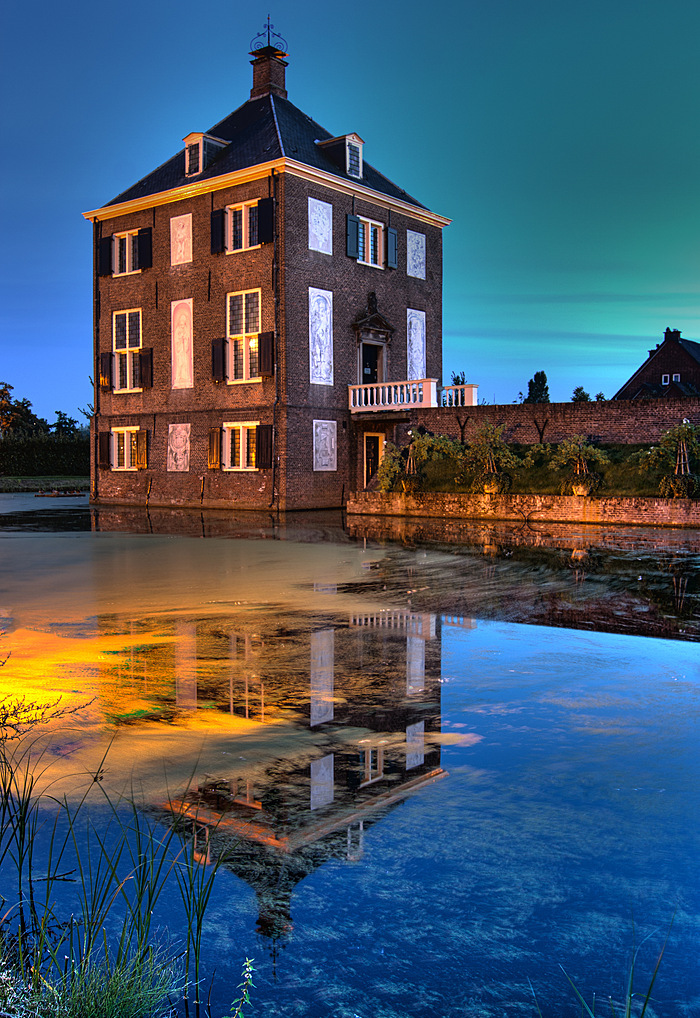
Dutch mathematician Christiaan Huygens felt the earthquake in his mansion at Hofwijck.

Populations would have experienced "considerable damage or partial collapses" in buildings like homes and churches in addition to falling walls, columns, and monuments along with overturned furniture like barrels and bookshelves. In Liège, level VII-VIII shaking toppled chimneys, towers, and rooftops. Shockwaves quickly radiated across Belgium and damaged numerous large buildings far from the epicenter in Flanders and Hainaut Province. One person is recorded to have died in Mons, which experienced VII-intensity shaking.

Netherlands

The quake was felt more in regions around the Ardennes like the Duchy of Brabant than in places like Brussels or Antwerp. In Roermond, the vaults of the Minderbroederklooster collapsed. The Dutch mathematician Christiaan Huygens felt the earthquake in Hofwijck and recounted: "At half past two in the afternoon, while I was reading a book, I had suddenly and not without alarm felt an earthquake. The house clearly shook, moved back and forth, so that in the dining room paintings were beaten against the gilded leather on the walls.The stone floor where I stood lifted slightly and fell again, several times for 10 to 12 seconds." Huygens presumed the quake must have been caused by an exploding gunpowder reserve in Dunkirk. A tower in Amsterdam left tilted by the earthquake inspired a woodcut by Simon Fokke, titled "Aardbeeving" or "Earthquake."

England

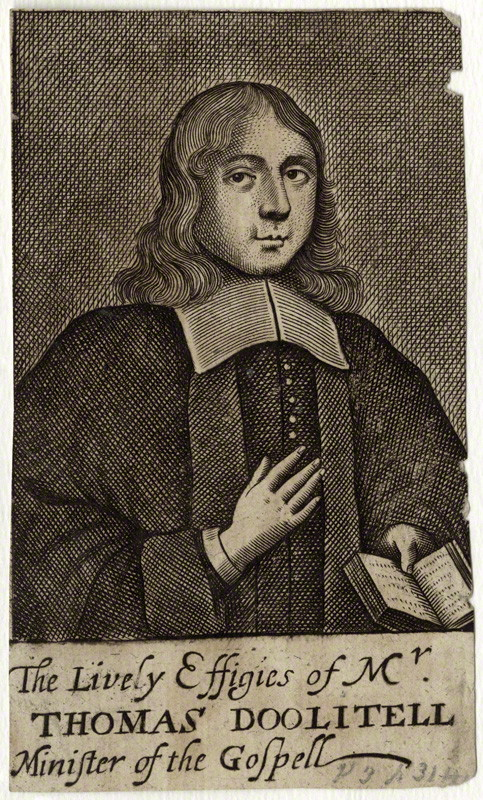
English author Thomas Doolittle viewed earthquakes as divine messages.

Shaking was felt throughout southern England. Dover was closest to the epicenter and felt the first shockwaves, and to the west a portion of Castle Saltwood collapsed. Robert Dickman, the minister at St. Pete's Church in Colchester, recounted: "...on Thursday 8 September 1692 [sic] there happened about two of ye Clock in the afternoon for ye space of a minute of more there was a universall earthquake all over England, France, Holland, and some parts of Germany and particularly it was attested to me by the Masons that were then plaistering the Steeple of St Peter in this towne and uppon the upper most scaffold of the steeple parted so wide in ye midst that they could have put their hand in the crack or cleft and immediately shut up close again, without any damage to the workmen (who expected all would have fallen down) or to the steeple itself. Most of the houses here and elsewhere shook and part of a chimney fell down on North Hill, and very many who were sensible of it were taken at ye same time with a giddynes in their head, for some short time, in witness of what is here related I have here set my hand."

The earthquakes left a strong impression on London author Thomas Doolittle, who felt inspired by his and others' experiences to write Earthquakes Explained and Practically Improved. Due to differences in the Old Style and New Style of dates, Doolittle (and many other sources) record the event as occurring on 8 September 1692 (with Doolittle noting its similar date to an earthquake described by Josephus that struck Jerusalem during the reign of Vespasian). Such seismic theophany reoccurs in English literature and recollections about the earthquake, but all sources on continental Europe date the main event as occurring on Thursday, 18 September 1692 at around 2 o'clock in the afternoon.

France

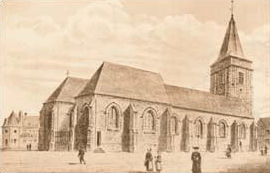
During the quake, the church at Linselles moved "like a swing" and the bell tower run 10 times.

Lille, 198 kilometers from Verviers in the French Bishopric of Cambrai, experienced Level VI-VII shaking. Félix Vincre, the parish clerk at Linselles, was in the attic of the clergy house near a cemetery when it shook so much he believed it would collapse. Two others in a barn across the cemetery saw the parish church move "like a swing" and the bell tower rung ten times. Mineral springs in northeastern France behaved differently during the earthquake. Paris experienced level IV-intensity shaking but little damage.

Germany

German-speaking sources felt the main quake and the aftershocks.

== Aftershocks ==
Researchers from Royal Observatory of Belgium have determined there were seven significant aftershocks of the earthquake from 1692 to 1694, many of them occurring in the area of modern North Rhine-Westphalia. Two large aftershocks followed the main event on the same day, each one large enough to be felt over 135 kilometers from Liege to Essen. The third aftershock occurred on the 20 September, and was felt widely in Frankfurt.

Another aftershock was felt in Maastricht on 18 December, and violent shaking was observed at a church tower in Den Bosch.

== Cultural effects ==
Architectural heritages in Verviers and surrounding regions were significantly affected by the earthquakes. Sermons and piety were inspired in the more religious populations.

== Regional tectonics ==
The earthquake and its aftershocks became a sequence of earthquakes that struck the Lower Rhine Graben in late 1692. Eastern Belgium is part of the Lower Rhine Graben, a system of faults which also run through the English Channel, The Netherlands, Luxembourg, and Germany. Most of these are NW-SE dipping normal faults that are capable of producing damaging earthquakes a few times a century. One of these faults near Verviers, known as the Graben de la Minerie but also the Verviers or Ostend fault, shows signs of recent geological activity. A fault scarp also exists near Verviers. It is unknown if the epicenter was north or south of the Vesdre River.
