= Edward Bury (disambiguation) =

Edward Bury was a locomotive manufacturer.

Edward Bury may also refer to:

- Edward Bury and Company
- Edward Bury (minister) (1616–1700), English ejected minister
- Edward Bury (MP), Member of Parliament for Maldon

== See also ==
- Edward Berry (disambiguation)
