= Edward Berry (disambiguation) =

Edward Berry (1768–1831) was a Royal Navy officer.

Edward Berry may also refer to:

- Edward Berry (actor) (1706–1760), British stage actor
- Edward Berry (soldier) (died 1920), Canadian Rhodes Scholar
- Edward Elhanan Berry (1861–1931), English diplomat
- Edward Fleetwood Berry (1817–1875), Anglican priest in Ireland
- Edward W. Berry (1875–1945), American paleontologist and botanist
- Ed Berry (born 1963), former defensive back in the National Football League

== See also ==
- Ted Berry (1905–2000), American politician
- Ted Berry (basketball) (born 1972), American basketball player
- Edward Bury (disambiguation)
