= Matthias Candler =

English clergyman, topographer and antiquarian

Matthias Candler (24 February 1605 – 6 December 1663), also known as Matthias Gillet, was an English Church of England clergyman, topographer and antiquarian. He compiled an extensive survey of Suffolk and its families in the 1650s.

== Biography ==
Candler was the son of William Gillet or Candler (c.1580–1612), a schoolmaster in Yoxford, Suffolk, and Hannah Fiske (c.1585–1649). In 1620, he entered Trinity College, Cambridge and graduated with a Bachelor of Arts in 1624. On 18 May 1625 he married Anne Devereux, by whom he had three sons and two daughters. He undertook a master's degree at Peterhouse, Cambridge in 1628.

On 18 December 1625 Candler was ordained at Norwich Cathedral, and on 16 December 1629 he was appointed vicar of Coddenham, Suffolk, a position he held until his death. He was noted for his nonconformist churchmanship and in 1636 he was admonished by Bishop Matthew Wren. In 1646 he signed the petition concerning church government to the House of Lords, and was chosen to serve on the local presbyterian classis. He was a friend of John Fairfax, who wrote in 1696 that Candler "never was forward for conformity... all, far and near, flock'd after his Ministry".

During the 1650s, Candler made extensive and detailed records of churches and the pedigrees and arms of the notable families of Suffolk and East Anglia. He based much of the information on his own knowledge and interactions with members of the Suffolk gentry, leaving personal descriptions of many of the county's leading figures. The records, including details of each parish, its land holdings and values (alongside their owners), are the most comprehensive surviving survey of Suffolk from the 17th century. He left at least seven different manuscript versions which are now held by the Bodleian Library, Society of Antiquaries of London, College of Arms, Cambridge University Library and Harleian Library collections. Among them is Arms and pedigrees of Suffolk families (c.1650) and an account of the Fiske family. Some copies have additions from William Blois and Candler's eldest son, Philip.

He died Coddenham on 6 December 1663.
