= John Fairfax (disambiguation) =

John Fairfax (1804–1877) was an English-born Australian journalist.

John Fairfax may also refer to:

- John Fairfax (delegate) (1762–1843), manager for George Washington who became a planter and politician in what became West virginia
- John Fairfax (minister) (1623–1700), English ejected minister
- John Fairfax, 11th Lord Fairfax of Cameron (1830–1900), British peer with American citizenship
- John Fairfax (poet) (1930–2009), English poet
- John Fairfax (rower) (1937–2012), British ocean rower and adventurer

== See also ==
- John Fairfax Holdings (founded 1841), predecessor of Australian company Fairfax Media
