= Ted Berry (disambiguation) =

Ted Berry (1905–2000) was an American politician.

Ted Berry is also the name of:

- Ted Berry (basketball) (born 1972), American basketball player

== See also ==
- Edward Berry (disambiguation)
