= Pepinster =

Municipality in Liège Province, Wallonia, Belgium

Pepinster Pepinster (Walloon)
- Municipality
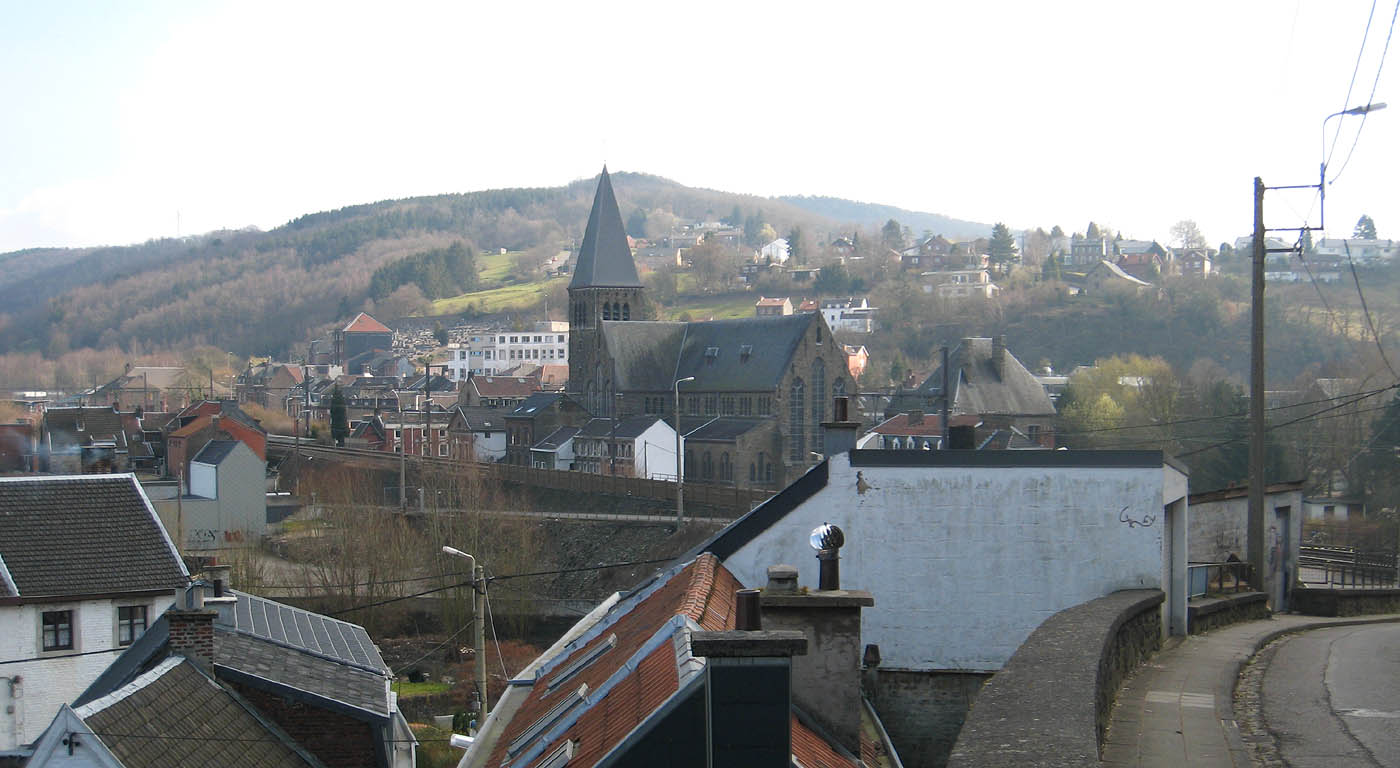

- Flag Coat of arms

- Location of Pepinster in the province of Liège
- Interactive map of Pepinster
- Location in Belgium
- Coordinates: 50°34′N 05°49′E
- Country: Belgium
- Community: French Community
- Region: Wallonia
- Province: Liège
- Arrondissement: Verviers

Government
  - Mayor: Philippe Godin
  - Governing party: PEPIN

Area
  - Total: 24.9 km^{2} (9.6 sq mi)

Population (2018-01-01)
  - Total: 9,765
  - Density: 392/km^{2} (1,020/sq mi)
- Postal codes: 4860-4861
- NIS code: 63058
- Area codes: 087
- Website: www.pepinster.be

Pepinster (French pronunciation: [pepɛ̃stɛʁ] or [pəpɛ̃stɛʁ]) is a municipality of Wallonia located in the province of Liège, Belgium.

On 1 January 2006 Pepinster had a total population of 9,560. The total area is 24.79 km^{2} which gives a population density of 386 inhabitants per km^{2}. Pepinster is situated at the confluence of the rivers Hoëgne and Vesdre.

The municipality consists of the following districts: Cornesse, Pepinster (including the hamlet of Tancrémont), Soiron, and Wegnez.

Pepinster was hit extremely hard by the 2021 European floods, the village was temporarily cut off from roads.

== Image gallery ==
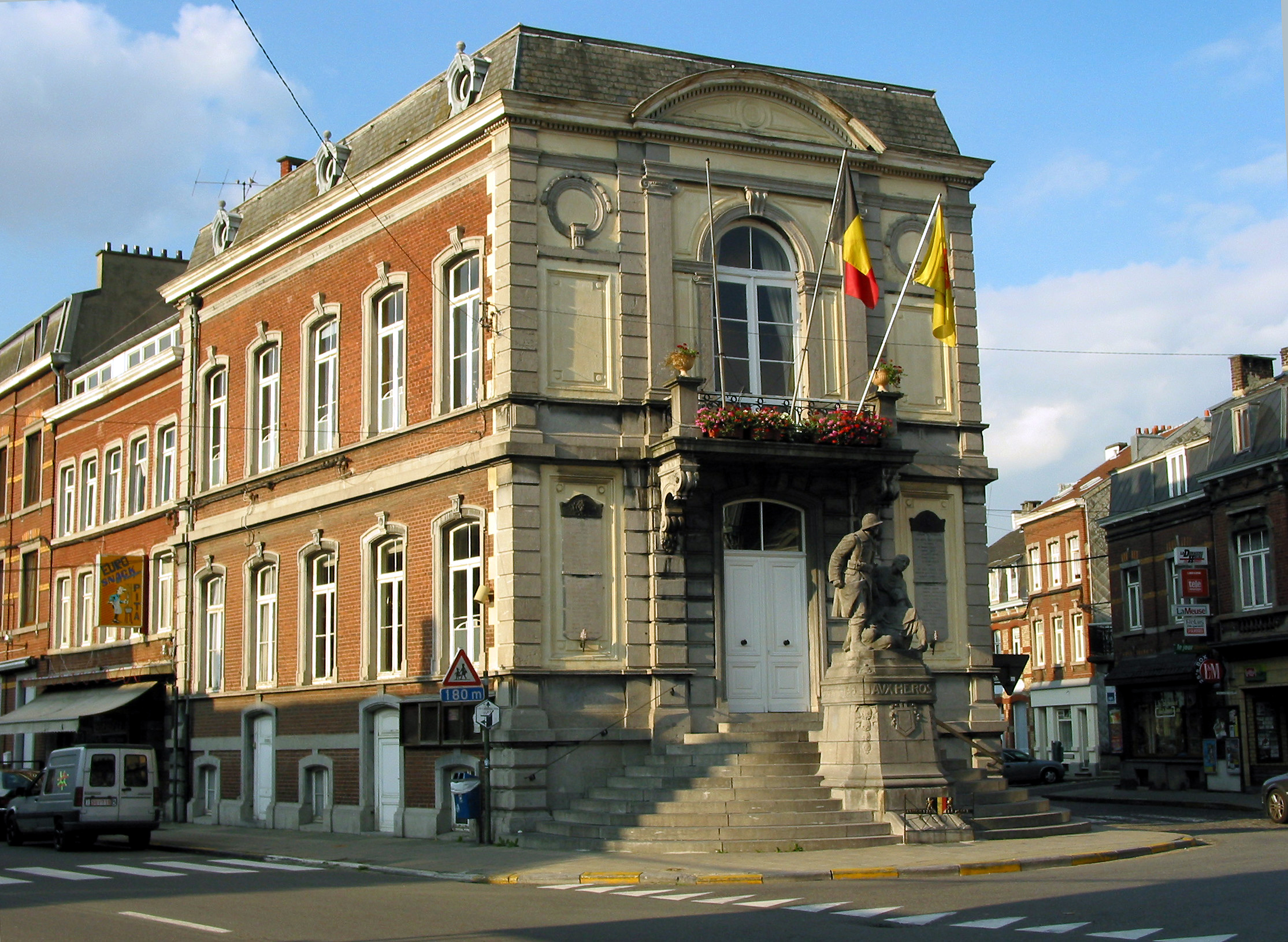
Pepinster town hall

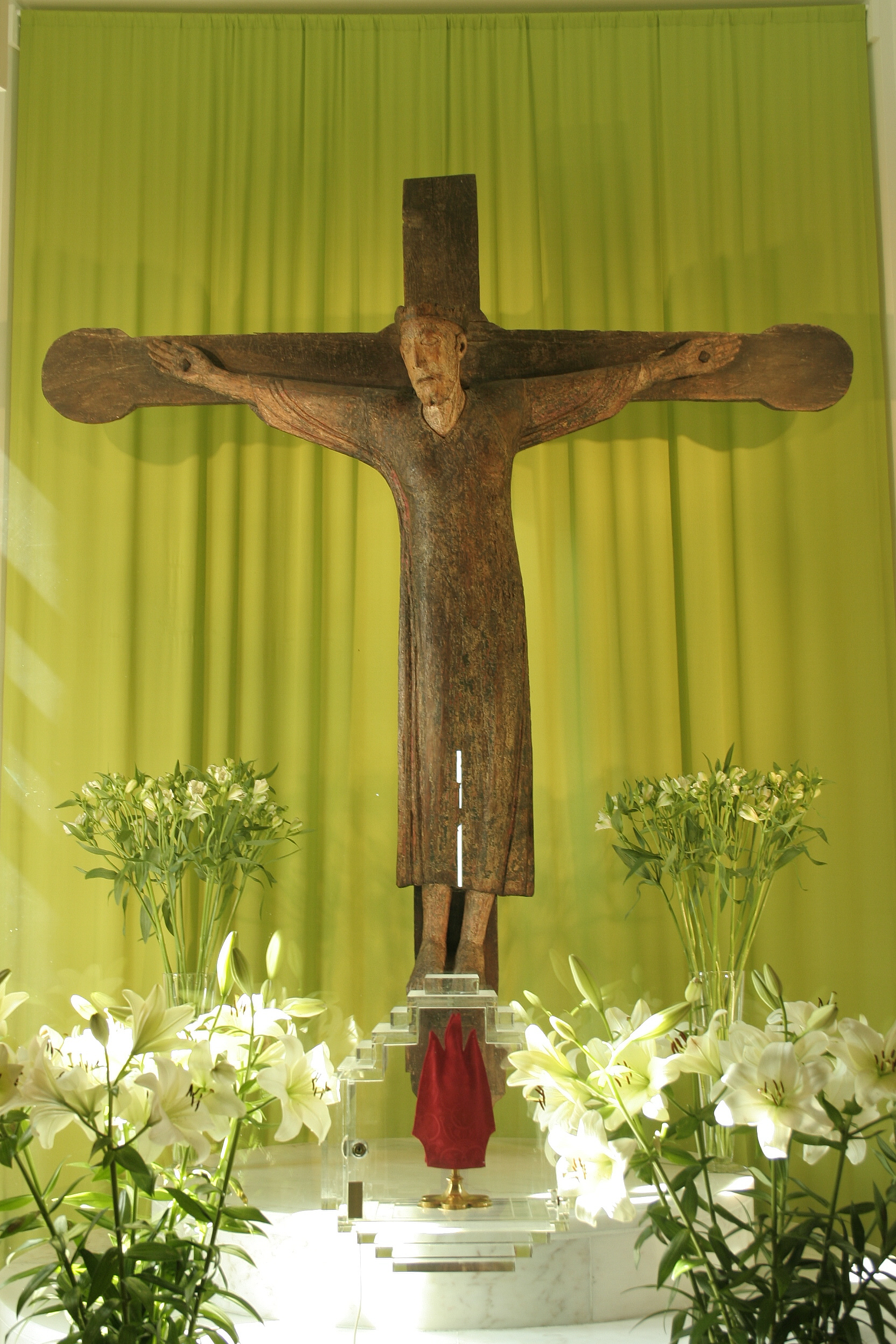
Romanesque Christ (11th century)

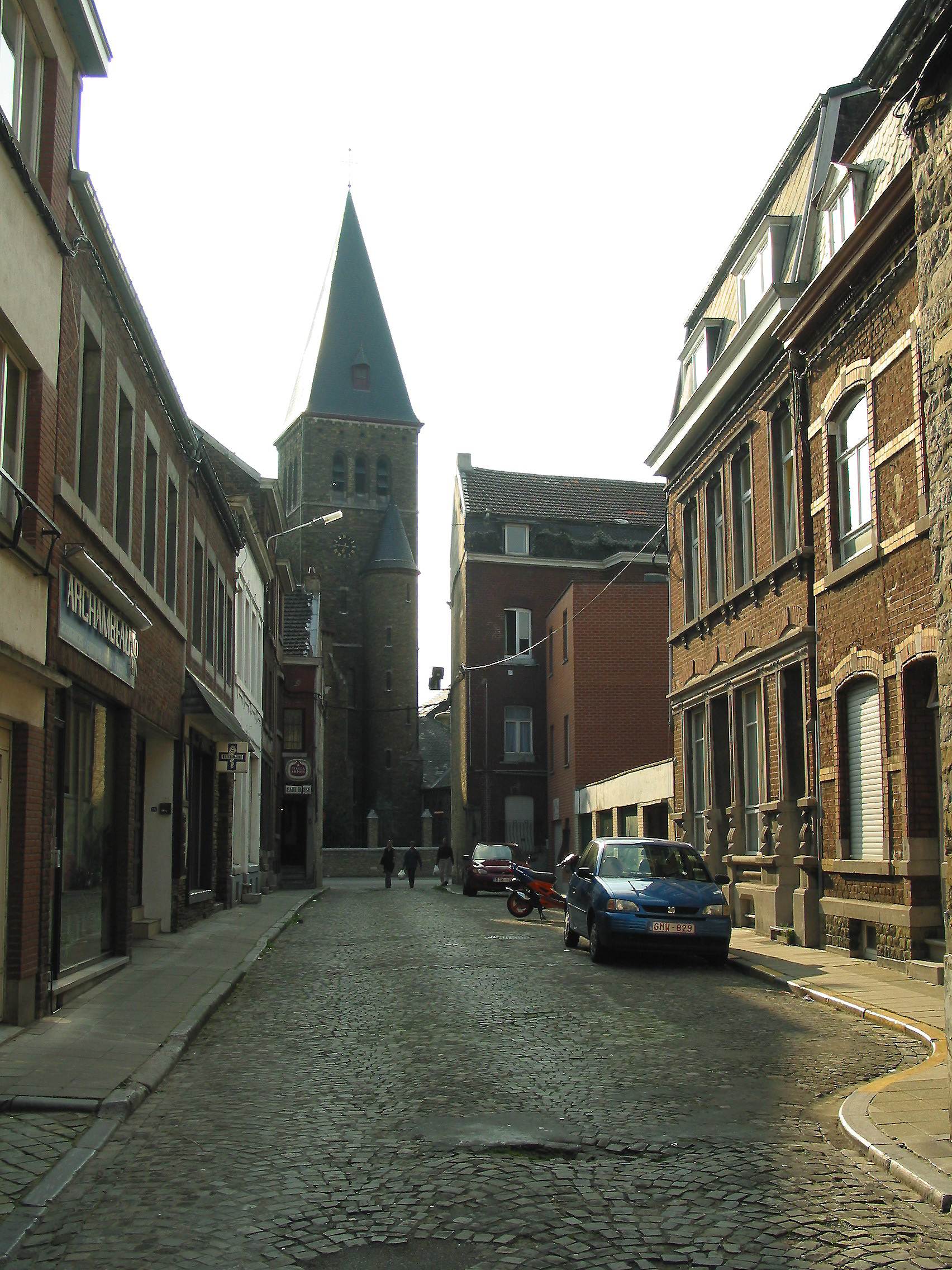

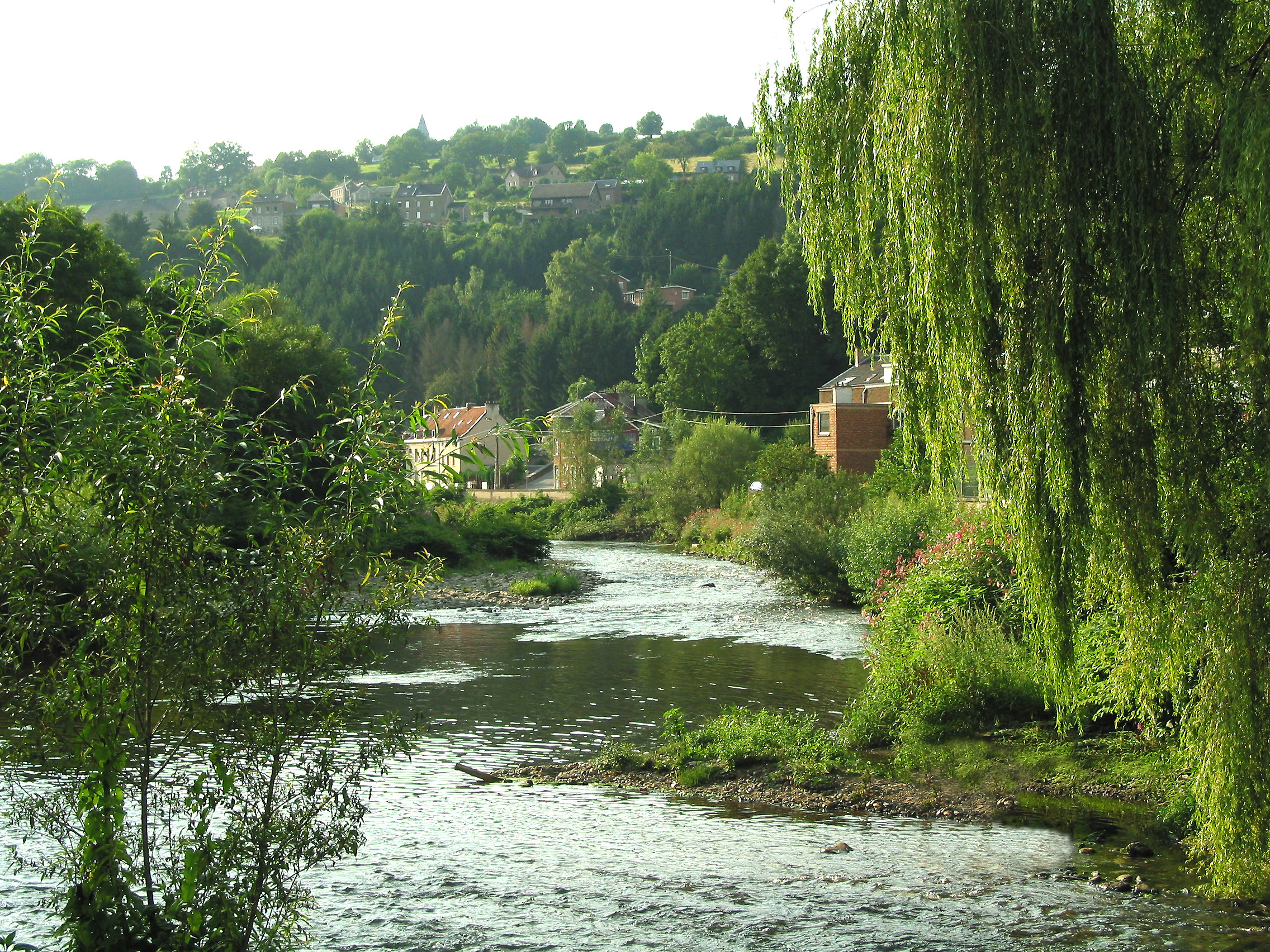
Vesdre river

== See also ==
- Fort de Tancrémont, a companion to Fort Eben-Emael, located just outside the town
- List of protected heritage sites in Pepinster
- Shrine of Tancrémont
