= Samuel Bury =

Samuel Bury (1663–1730) was an English Presbyterian minister.

== Life ==
The son of Edward Bury, he was born at Great Bolas, Shropshire, where he was baptised on 21 April 1663. He was educated at Thomas Doolittle's academy, at that time in Islington. Here he was contemporary with Matthew Henry, who entered in 1680, and made friends with Bury. Edmund Calamy, who entered in 1682, speaks of Bury as a student of philosophy, not divinity.

Bury's first settlement was at Bury St Edmunds, before the Toleration Act 1688. In 1690 a house in Churchgate Street was bought, and converted into a place of worship, with a substantial congregation. In Samuel Tymms's Handbook of Bury St. Edmunds it is stated that Daniel Defoe was an attendant on his ministry.

In 1696, Bury was engaged in collecting a list of the nonconforming ministers; Oliver Heywood supplied him (14 August) with the names in Yorkshire and Lancashire, through Samuel Angier. On 11 August 1700, John Fairfax, ejected from Barking-cum-Needham, Suffolk, died (aged seventy-six) at his house in that parish; Bury preached two funeral sermons for him; the one at the actual funeral at Barking was, by an unusual concession, delivered in the parish church.

A chapel in Churchgate Street was built in 1711, and opened 30 December. Bury preached the opening sermon. Bury, who suffered with the stone, went with his wife to Bath in the autumn of 1719, on a journey of health. Just before he set out on his return home, he received overtures from Lewin's Mead, Bristol. This was the larger of the two presbyterian congregations in Bristol, and it had been vacant since the death of Michael Pope in 1718. It counted 1,600 adherents.

Bury agreed to go to Bristol for six months "to make a tryal of the waters there". He arrived there on 8 April 1720. In little more than a month he lost his wife. His stay at Bristol was permanent; he had as assistant (probably from 1721) John Diaper, who succeeded him as pastor, and resigned in 1751. Under Bury's ministry the congregation increased both in numbers and in wealth.

In the Hewley suit, 1830–42, efforts were made by the Unitarian defendants to collect indications of concession to heterodox opinion on the part of Bury, as a representative Presbyterian of his time. Thomas Smith James's History of the Litigation and Legislation respecting Presbyterian chapels claimed that the 'Exhortation' at Savage's ordination, quoted to prove opposition to the Calvinistic Doctrine of Election, was not by Bury, but by John Rastrick, M.A., of Lynn (died 18 August 1727). In a farewell letter from Bury to his Lewin's Mead congregation, he says, 'I never was prostituted to any party, but have endeavoured to serve God as a catholic Christian,’ and speaks of requirements which have no good Scripture warrant, as making 'apocryphal sins and duties.' The address is practical, avoids controversy, and is evangelical in tone.

Bury died 10 March 1730, and was buried in St. James's churchyard, where there had been an altar tomb with Latin epitaphs to Bury and his wife. He married, on 29 May 1697, Elizabeth Bury, second daughter of Captain Adams Lawrence, of Linton, Cambridgeshire.

== Works ==
Bury published:

- A Scriptural Catechism, being an Abridgment of Mr. O. Stockton's, design'd especially for the use of charity schools in Edmund's-Bury, 1699.
- A Collection of Psalms, Hymns, &c., for private use, 3rd ed. 1713.
- Θρηνωδία. The People's Lamentation for the Loss of their Dead Ministers, or Three Sermons occasioned by the death of the late Reverend and Learned Divines, Mr. John Fairfax and Mr. Timothy Wright, 1702.
- A Funeral Sermon for the Rev. Mr. Samuel Cradock, &c. 1707.
- Two sermons preach'd at the opening of a new erected Chappel in St. Edmunds-Bury, &c., 1712.
- 'A Funeral Sermon for Robert Baker, Esq., &c., 1714.
- The Questions at the ordination of S. Savage, printed with John Rastrick's Sermon on the occasion, 1714.
- An Account of the Life and Death of Mrs. Elizabeth Bury, &c., chiefly collected out of her own Diary, Bristol, 1720, 4th edit. 1725.
