= Erdington Academy =

Location
- Kingsbury Road; Birmingham, West Midlands, B24 8RE; England; 52.514507°N 1.8382319°W

Information
- Type: Academy
- Established: 2016
- Local authority: Birmingham City Council
- Trust: Fairfax Multi-Academy Trust
- Department for Education URN: 143413 Tables
- Ofsted: Reports
- Headteacher: Simon Mallet
- Gender: Mixed
- Age: 11 to 16
- Enrolment: 802 as of March 2016
- Houses: Arden, Sherwood, Mercia, Dean
- Colours: Black and blue
- Website: http://www.erdingtonacademy.bham.sch.uk

Erdington Academy is a mixed-sex academy located in Erdington, Birmingham, England. Erdington Academy converted to an academy status in September 2016, joining the Fairfax Multi Academy Trust. The academy had its opening ceremony on 17 October 2016, being officially opened by Labour MP, Jack Dromey. The school is part of the same family of school as Fairfax Academy in Sutton Coldfield.

== General information ==
Erdington Academy is a multicultural, 11-16 school of 800+ students. Located in the suburb of Erdington (4 miles north of Birmingham city centre), on an 11-acre site which includes a range of specialist sports facilities including a community leisure centre which is used by a range of community groups and sports clubs

== Academy conversion ==
The school was formerly Kingsbury School and Sports College and converted to an academy within the Fairfax Multi-Academy Trust family of schools in September 2016. This initial school-to-school support from Fairfax Multi Academy Trust since February 2015 saw a "revolution in behaviour" at the school and behaviour was rated as 'good' the last time Ofsted inspectors visited the site in November 2015

== About Erdington Academy ==
The school serves an area of significant deprivation.

The Erdington Academy uniform is a traditional black blazer with blue tie and accompanying house stripes.

In its first year of operation, the academy forged links with many local businesses including Jaguar Land Rover and colleges. One of the school's core values is 'Ambition'.

The school has a competitive traditional house system and each house has elected representatives who also take the lead in raising funds for each house's chosen charity. The annual Sports Day sees the culmination of house competitions across the academic year. which encompass a range of competitive aspects such as rewards stickers, attendance and house activities such as Tug of War.

Competitive sport is also a part of the school with students taking part in a wide range of extra-curricular activities and competing against other local schools in different sports. The school has an ongoing partnership with the Wasps rugby team to support students in competitive rugby and has competed in the recent Sutton Games in a range of sports and events. Erdington Academy also hosts the Kingsbury School Sports Partnership which provides students at Erdington Academy with opportunities to lead aspects of sport involving local primary schools.

The school has enjoyed sporting successes against local schools, particularly in netball, rounders, football and cricket.

Drama and the arts are a feature of the school also with productions and festivals taking place throughout the academic year

The Duke of Edinburgh Award scheme sees students taking part in the national programme to develop their character and resilience by expeditions and volunteer work.

== History of the school site ==
It was Opened in 1918 as Ryland Road Council Secondary School, in temporary premises on Ryland Road with 210 pupils. The school moved to its current premises in Kingsbury Road in 1923. It was built on the former Pipe Orchard Farm. The school has also been known as Erdington Girls' County Grammar School and Erdington Council Secondary School. Accommodation for pupils was increased to 316 when the building was enlarged in 1932, again in 1954 to 522 and in 1961 to 746. In 1938, 95 per cent of pupils came from elementary schools. Fees at first £4 a year, £12 by 1938, when 38 per cent of pupils paid.

During the Second World War, the girls from the grammar school were evacuated to Ashby — de — la — Zouche in Leicestershire. Nellie Garrat a pupil at the time was interviewed in 2005 about the experience and she was also invited to the opening of Erdington Academy in 2016.
