= List of protected heritage sites in Pepinster =

This table shows an overview of the protected heritage sites in the Walloon town Pepinster. This list is part of Belgium's national heritage.

Object	Year/architect	Town/section	Address	Coordinates	Number^{?}	Image
Sclassin Castle: walls and roofs, and the surrounding area ^{(nl)} ^{(fr)}		Pepinster		50.589397°N 5.803293°E	63058-CLT-0001-01 Info	
Roman fortifications of Becoën ^{(nl)} ^{(fr)}		Pepinster		50.562940°N 5.773603°E	63058-CLT-0002-01 Info	
17th century house: walls and roofs ^{(nl)} ^{(fr)}		Pepinster	rue du Centre, n°32	50.592368°N 5.789902°E	63058-CLT-0003-01 Info	
Chapel Notre-Dame Débonnaire de Saint-Roch ^{(nl)} ^{(fr)}		Pepinster		50.591687°N 5.811073°E	63058-CLT-0006-01 Info	
Church of Saint-Roch, including the tower and the walled cemetery ^{(nl)} ^{(fr)}		Pepinster		50.592470°N 5.790873°E	63058-CLT-0007-01 Info	Kerk Saint-Roch, waaronder de toren en het ommuurde kerkhof
The towers of Soiron castle ^{(nl)} ^{(fr)}		Pepinster		50.593345°N 5.789984°E	63058-CLT-0008-01 Info	De torens van het kasteel van Soiron
Soiron castle, except the towers classified by Royal Decree on 30 November 1960, and the park area ^{(nl)} ^{(fr)}		Pepinster		50.593735°N 5.789570°E	63058-CLT-0009-01 Info	Kasteel van Soiron, uitgezonderd de geclassificeerde torens per Koninklijk Besluit op 30 november 1960, en het ensemble van het kasteel, het park en de omgeving
Moraithier Forest ^{(nl)} ^{(fr)}		Pepinster		50.593048°N 5.790042°E	63058-CLT-0010-01 Info	
House ^{(nl)} ^{(fr)}		Pepinster	rue du Village, n°30-31	50.592399°N 5.790209°E	63058-CLT-0011-01 Info	
Pastorage ^{(nl)} ^{(fr)}		Pepinster	rue du Village, n°90	50.590957°N 5.790715°E	63058-CLT-0012-01 Info	
"Le Vieux Bon Dieu de Tancrémont" Cross ^{(nl)} ^{(fr)}		Pepinster		50.551563°N 5.782855°E	63058-CLT-0013-01 Info	Kruis met de naam "le Vieux Bon Dieu de Tancrémont"
Station: window ^{(nl)} ^{(fr)}		Pepinster	place Albert Ier	50.568254°N 5.806782°E	63058-CLT-0015-01 Info	Station: raam
Parts of old farmhouses: façades, roofs, and staircases of numbers 78-80 and paved footpath to the front and rear of 80 A ^{(nl)} ^{(fr)}		Pepinster	rue du Centre n°80	50.591798°N 5.790914°E	63058-CLT-0017-01 Info	
Church of Saint-Antoine l'Ermite: exterior and interior, including furnishings ^{(nl)} ^{(fr)}		Pepinster	rue Neuve 3	50.567924°N 5.802904°E	63058-CLT-0018-01 Info	Totaliteit van de kerk Saint-Antoine l'Ermite: interieur en exterieur, waaronder het meubilair
Valley of Fierain ^{(nl)} ^{(fr)}		Pepinster		50.588939°N 5.823503°E	63058-CLT-0019-01 Info	
Eight border markers of the Marquis of Franchimont in Liege and Louveigné, principality of Stavelot ^{(nl)} ^{(fr)}		Pepinster		50.528216°N 5.758792°E	63058-CLT-0020-01 Info	

== See also ==
- List of protected heritage sites in Liège (province)
