= Lund Washington =

American steward (1737–1796)

- Born: 1737; Stafford County, Colony of Virginia
- Died: 1796 (aged 58–59); Fairfax County, Virginia, U.S.
- Employer: George Washington
- Known for: steward of Mount Vernon
- Spouse: Elizabeth Foote
- Children: Daughters died as infants

Lund Washington (1737–1796) was a distant cousin of George Washington who served as steward of the Mount Vernon estate during the American Revolution.

== Early and family life ==
Lund Washington was the fourth son of Townshend Washington (1705–1743) and his wife Elizabeth Lund (1705–1773). Lund was born in what was then Stafford County but soon became King George County on Virginia's Northern Neck. His grandfather, John Washington (1671–1712), was the son of Lawrence Washington (1635–1677), who emigrated from Britain to Virginia as did his brother John Washington, both settling in the Northern Neck region. This Lund Washington's eldest brother, Robert Washington (1729–1800) married Alice Strother and named their sixth son Lund Washington (1767–1853) after either their mother's surname or this uncle; the younger Lund Washington eventually became postmaster of Washington, D.C., and married twice. Townshend Washington's other sons were Thomas Washington (1731–1794) and Lawrence Washington (1735–1799); the family also included daughter Catherine Washington (1740–1792) who married her cousin John Washington (1729–1782) who represented King George County in the House of Delegates.

In 1779, this Lund Washington married Elizabeth (Betsy) Foote, then 33 years old, whose 34-year-old sister Catherine had married his brother Lawrence five years earlier. The Foote daughters were fourth generation Virginians. However, neither couple had children who survived them. Both of Betsy's daughters died as infants, and Catherine was childless. Betsy Foote Washington's piety would be shown in her prayer journals as well as household devotions which included slaves. After Lund Washington's death, Betsy Foote Washington adopted her nephew William Hayward Foote (1781–1846) and bequeathed the Hayfield plantation to him.

According to his nephew (the postmaster mentioned above), before his marriage, this Lund Washington had a son with a housekeeper, who then moved to Connellsville (in Fayette County, Pennsylvania, disputed between Virginia and Pennsylvania in the earliest days of the Republic). However, when a veteran with a large family attempted to visit Lund Washington in his final years, he refused to see him, having heard a report years earlier that his son John had been killed fighting Native Americans. That nephew Lund Washington (in that same unpublished manuscript) also characterized the President's testamentary emancipation of his slaves as "the ... worst act of his public life."

== Career ==
Before beginning work for his uncle, Lund Washington managed an Albemarle County plantation for Mr. Beverly, then Ravensworth in Fairfax County for William Fitzhugh for several years. In 1764 he accepted his cousin General George Washington's offer and became manager of Mt. Vernon and associated plantations, growing in responsibilities and serving for approximately two decades, until 1785. While George Washington was a hands-on owner when actually present in Virginia, Lund Washington was the estates' principal manager during his absence, especially during the American Revolutionary War. Considerable correspondence between the two exists, particularly as Lund Washington supervised renovations of the manor house and slave quarters during the conflict.

On April 14, 1781, HMS Savage, under Master and Commander Thomas Graves, arrived off Mount Vernon. Graves demanded Lund provide provisions to Savage or else he would order Mount Vernon burned. Although Lund initially refused, Graves gave him a chance to reconsider and Lund eventually sent the provisions, in part to try and recover 17 of George's slaves who had escaped to the British seeking freedom. Though the slaves were not returned, Savage departed without burning Mount Vernon. Both Lund and the Marquis de Lafayette sent letters on the incident to George, who wrote a letter back to Lund chastizing him for supplying Savage with provisions. Of the 17 slaves who escaped, seven were returned to Mount Vernon following the 1781 siege of Yorktown, three escaped to freedom in Nova Scotia and the remaining seven disappeared from the historical record.

By his departure from Mount Vernon in 1785, Lund Washington may have saved enough to purchase the 360-acre Hayfield plantation in Fairfax County from his cousin, or that was the plantation the General exchanged for another farm Lund had purchased from Thomas Hanson Marshall in 1779 (the year of his marriage), else General Washington gave it to Lund because he took no salary during the five years of the American Revolutionary War. In the 1787 tax census for Fairfax County, Lund Washington owned 13 Blacks above age 16 and six under age 16, as well as 12 horses and 16 cattle (compared to General George Washington owning 109 Blacks above age 16, 91 below that age, and 93 horses and 195 cattle). He freed one enslaved Black man, Edward Shankling, in October 1793.

Per the oft-cited Cincinnatus analogy, General Washington resumed active management of his estates following Lund's departure, but found no manager who satisfied him, or was willing to serve, for so long. Brother Charles Washington's son George Augustine Washington began serving his uncle in the 1786, and was the principal manager during the early years of his uncles' presidency, but died of tuberculosis in 1791. During his final years, in addition to hired managers from Britain (whom the President thought for the most part failed for lack of experience overseeing enslaved Blacks), the former president basically successively employed three sons of his sister Betty Washington Lewis: Howell Lewis, Robert Lewis and Lawrence Lewis. Also John Fairfax and his brother Hezekiah served as overseers for several years in the mid-1780s, before establishing their own estates and farming using enslaved labor, with John Fairfax crossing the Appalachian Mountains and also serving in the Virginia House of Delegates.

== Death and legacy ==
Lund Washington became blind before his death in 1796, survived by his widow, to whom he had bequeathed his entire estate. Lund Washington built a house on his Hayfield plantation, which survived him but burned in 1917.
