= Nelle Morton =

- Born: Nelle Katherine Morton; January 7, 1905; Smalling, Tennessee
- Died: July 14, 1987 (aged 82); Claremont, California
- Education: Flora MacDonald College (B.A.); New York Theological Seminary (M.R.E.)
- Occupation: Professor

Nelle Katherine Morton (January 7, 1905 – July 14, 1987) was an American theologian, professor, feminist activist, and civil rights leader. She taught Christian Education for fourteen years at Drew University, during which time she became passionate about improving the position of women within the Christian faith. She wrote prolifically on religion, spirituality, feminism, intersectionality, and language. In 1985, she published an anthology of essays titled The Journey Is Home.

== Early life ==
Morton was born on January 7, 1905, in Smalling, Tennessee to Jonathan Morrell Morton and Mary Katherine O'Dell Morton. She and her sisters, Inez and Lucille, grew up in Kingsport, Tennessee. In 1925, Morton graduated from Flora MacDonald College in Red Springs, North Carolina. After her graduation, she spent four years teaching public school in her hometown of Kingsport. During these years, Morton began graduate work at The General Assembly Training School in Richmond, Virginia, later moving to New York to attend the New York Theological Seminary. She received her Master's degree in Religious Education in 1931. She went on to continue her studies and research at various institutions, including the Graduate Ecumenical Institute in Cligny, Switzerland, L'Institut de Rousseau in Geneva, and the Institute for Policy Studies in Washington, D.C.

== Career ==
After receiving her graduate degree, Morton worked as an assistant at the Plymouth Congregational Church in Brooklyn, New York. She left this job in 1935 to become the Director of Religious Education at the First Presbyterian Church in Staunton, Virginia. In 1937, she began working as the Assistant Director of Youth Work for the Board of Christian Education of the Presbyterian Church. During her time there, she worked to organize youth camps and conferences that allowed and encouraged adolescents of all races to attend.

From 1945 to 1949, Morton was the General Secretary of the Fellowship of Southern Churchmen, an organization that welcomed religious men and women of varying faiths and races and had by this time become active in leading reform on race issues and reconstruction. Through this work, Morton became close friends with the civil rights organizer and educator Jean E. Fairfax, then the Dean of Women at first Kentucky State College and then Tuskegee Institute. In 1949, Morton's health required her to move back to Tennessee to live on her family's farm. She spent the next seven years teaching physically and mentally handicapped children. She innovated camping programs for handicapped children, producing a prizewinning film on these programs. She also used this time to focus on her writing, publishing both The Bible and Its Use and The Church We Cannot See.

In 1956, Morton moved to Madison, New Jersey to teach Christian Education at the Theological School of Drew University. During this time she taught a course on "Women in Church and Society," which is thought to be the first course to address the role of women in this field. This course coincided with her shift toward focusing on the status of women within the Christian church. Both during and after her tenure at Drew University, she spoke widely and sometimes taught courses at other universities. She also spoke at the World Council of Churches Consultation in Berlin in 1974, and at the World Federation of Methodist Women in Dublin in 1976.

== Awards and legacy ==
In 1979, Morton was awarded with an honorary Doctor of Humane Letters degree from St. Andrews Presbyterian College. In 1984, Drew University awarded her a Doctor of Humane Letters for her work at the university and for the church.

Drew University began hosting an annual Nelle K. Morton lecture in her honor. In 1986, the School of Theology at Claremont began hosting lectures in honor of Morton and Anne Bennett.

Morton's work has been cited as influential in increasing the establishment of women's centers and courses on the topic of women and religion at religious and secular schools. Morton has been described by Rosemary Radford Ruether as a "foremother" for many feminists.
