= Unitarian Meeting House, Ipswich =

Church in Suffolk, England

Coordinates: 52°03′20″N 1°09′07″E

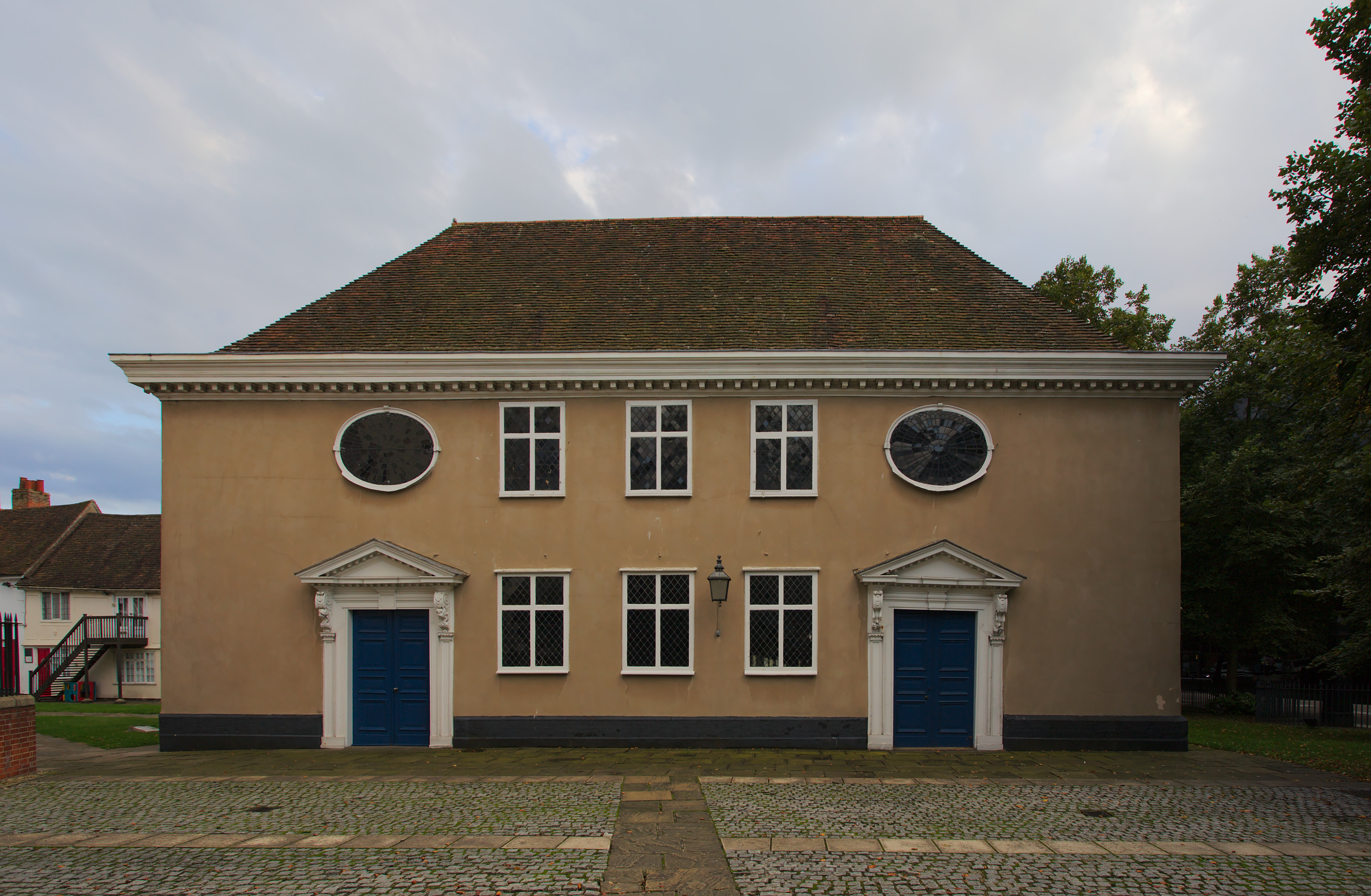
- The Unitarian Meeting House, Ipswich, Suffolk
- Unitarian Meeting House, Ipswich
- OS grid reference: SJ 377 885
- Denomination: Unitarian
- Website: Ipswich Unitarians

Architecture
- Functional status: Active
- Heritage designation: Grade I
- Designated: 1700

For the church building designed by Frank Lloyd Wright see Unitarian Meeting House (Madison, Wisconsin)

Unitarian Meeting House is a Grade I listed place of worship in Ipswich, Suffolk. It is a member of the General Assembly of Unitarian and Free Christian Churches, the umbrella organisation for British Unitarians.

The present building was opened by John Fairfax in 1700. Much of the original interior remains intact.

== Ministers ==
Ministers of the Meeting
Name	Years	Name	Years
Owen Stockton	1672–1680	Joseph William Smith	1866–1878
John Fairfax	1680–1700	Thomas Bennet Broadrick	1879–1891
Samuel Baxter	1701–1740	William E. Atack	1892–1895
William Shepherd	1721–1724	William Jellie	1896–1899
Samuel Say	1725–1734	E. Lucking Tavener	1900–1908
Thomas Scott	1737–1766	Arthur Golland	1910–1914
Peter Emans	1761–1762	John W. Saunders	1915–1920
Robert Lewin	1762–1770	Wilfred Harris	1920–1923
William Wood	1770–1773	Wallace A. McCubbin	1924–1929
James Pilkington	1774–1778	John Lewis	1930–1936
William Jervis	1778–1797	Joseph C.G. Burton	1938–1940
Samuel Parker	1797–1803	Winifred Brown	1943–1946
Thomas Rees	1803–1805	Harold A. Gore	1948–1949
Thomas Drummond	1805–1813	William Haworth	1950–1952
Isaac Perry	1813–1825	A. Phillip B. Hewett	1954–1956
John Philip	1825–1827	Nicholas John Teape	1957–1974
Andrew Melville	1827–1832	Edward A. Cahill	1975
Joseph Ketley	1834–1836	Robert H. Holmes	1976
Thomas Felix Thomas	1836–1852	Clifford Martin Reed	1976–2012
Henry Knott	1852–1853	David A. Robins	1992
John T. Cooper	1853–1863	James S. Corrigall	2012–2014
John Harrison	1863–1864	Lewis A. Connolly	2016–2019
