= Bournville School =

Location
- Hay Green Lane; Birmingham, B30 1SH; England; 52.4247°N 1.9544°W

Information
- Type: Academy Sponsor Led
- Motto: "Where learning leads to great opportunities."
- Established: 1954
- Department for Education URN: 141318 Tables
- Ofsted: Reports
- Head of Academy: Rekha Dhinsa
- Gender: Co-educational
- Age: 4 to 16
- Enrolment: 900
- Colours: Navy blue, Royal blue and White (and Black or Grey)
- Former Pupils: Old Griffinians
- FMAT Website: http://fmat.co.uk
- Website: bournvilleschool.org

Bournville School is an all-through school and primary school with academy status, for students aged 4–16, in Bournville, Birmingham in the United Kingdom. The school has around 850 pupils currently on the roll, including a primary provision of around 150 students. The school became an Academy School on 1 November 2014 under the sponsorship of The Fairfax Multi Academy Trust (FMAT). Fairfax Academy is also in the same MAT.

== History ==
Before Bournville became a comprehensive school in the 1970s, it was previously two sibling grammar schools: Bournville Girls Grammar School and Bournville Grammar-Technical School For Boys, previously known as Bournville Boys Technical School. The technical school for boys, the city's first technical school, opened in October 1955. The technical school later combined with the girls' grammar school on the same site, and its current full title is Bournville School and Sixth Form Centre: a Business, Enterprise and Music College.

=== Beginnings ===
Originally designed and built as two separate schools, the first to be opened was Bournville Girls' Grammar School adjacent to the A38 Bristol Road South south of Bournville village in autumn 1954, housed in a modern building.

One year later, in September 1955, Bournville Boys' Technical School was also opened at the top end of the same site, together with the separate and new two-story dining room and a purpose-built technical block between the two school buildings. The twin schools shared the main playing field, with timetables arranged so that activities of the two schools did not clash. The tennis courts were under the control of the girls' school and were not available to the boys' school, except by special arrangement at the weekends.

The establishment of Technical Grammar schools was a government initiative under the Tripartite Educational System, originally mapped out in the Education Act 1944, to encourage the development of the skilled senior and middle management engineers, scientists and technicians.

The new school's timetable ensured that in years seven to nine the traditional academic subjects were covered, while in years ten onwards academic studies were reduced and more time was spent on the technical subjects of chemistry, physics, woodwork, metalwork and technical drawing. The boys' school forged ties with local industrial and scientific concerns and, in return for cash sponsorship of materials and occasional teaching support by their specialists and foremen, those engineering businesses enjoyed first call on qualified pupils when they left school.

=== Segregation ===
During the early years there were no female teachers at the boys' school and only two male teachers at the girls' school. Great efforts were made by the teachers of both schools to keep the boys and girls from becoming distracted by interacting with each other. Lunchtime timetables were arranged so that the girls had the first two sittings and the boys were not allowed into the dining room building until it had been vacated. Sports activities on the sports field took place at different times and even at the end of the school day the girls' grammar school was dismissed fifteen minutes earlier. The only joint activities during the 1950s were occasional joint theatrical and musical productions and an after school ballroom dancing society in the boys' school hall. "Club Griffin" school dances in the 1960s and 1970s were mixed. A Mrs Cotton was the first Head Mistress at the Girls school when the school opened.

=== Sport and recognition ===
Boys and girls of all ages were required to wear a school uniform and cap for the boys and beret for the girls when travelling to or from school and on school trips. The wearing of caps was made non-compulsory after summer 1968. Team sports played were rugby and basketball in winter and cricket in summer. Teams competed in the Birmingham grammar school leagues at all age groups. The boys also had a swimming team and an athletics team. The girls' school played netball and hockey in winter and tennis in summer.

Both schools held an annual cross-country race. Entry was compulsory for all pupils, who also had to complete at least three after-school practice runs over the full course in the weeks preceding the race, with teachers placed on every corner to ensure nobody dropped out or took shortcuts.

=== After school activities ===
After school there were school clubs and societies organised and run by both teachers and senior pupils, which took place in classrooms all over both schools. There was a historical society, chess club, ballroom dancing society, geography club, film society, drama club, choral society, science club, astronomy society and the poetry club. The girls' grammar additionally had knitting and sewing clubs, a cookery club, a small string orchestra and a ballet society.

=== Merge ===
Entry to both schools in the early years had been by eleven-plus examination with both schools selecting only those pupils who had achieved the highest scores in the area's feeder schools. However, under government Circular 10/65, implemented by Birmingham's local education authority, the 11+ examination was scrapped along with the tripartite system of grammar, technical grammar and secondary modern schools, to be replaced by a comprehensive system.

The Bournville schools combined and became a joint comprehensive, switching to coeducational mixed education in September 1973. The schools' teaching staffs combined under a single management structure with a single head teacher. The original Girls' Grammar school building became the 'lower school' facility and the Boys' Grammar at the top end of the site became 'upper school'. The combined School has continued to maintain a reputation for excellence in the Selly Oak, Bournville and Northfield catchment areas.

The former Boys' School is now the upper school, called The Charlotte Brontë Building, and the former Girls' School is now the lower school, called The Edward Elgar Building. There is also an annex to the Elgar building (previously the Science Annex), housing one science lab and a resistant materials workshop. What was previously the Craft Block (for metalwork, pottery, and woodwork) is now called The William Morris Building, while the Dining Hall block is now called The Keynes Building, housing a single story dining hall with the sixth form centre and ICT classrooms. The Bournville Business Centre is within the Charlotte Brontë Building.

=== Recent history ===
In May 2011 the head teacher wrote to parents and carers that a sub-group of Governors had been considering becoming an Academy, and that the Governing Body had agreed to move on to the next stage of the Academy process which is to begin talks with the DFE and go to formal consultation with everyone involved.

Following a Governing Body meeting on 12 October 2011 the decision was made not to proceed with Academy Status for the time being as it was felt that the school was not yet ready for such a significant change.

The school was placed into special measures in late October 2013, following an Ofsted inspection. An IEB (Interim Executive Board) was put into place made up of experienced governors appointed by the Department of Education from recommendations by Birmingham City Council. The role of the IEB was to ensure that all the statutory duties of governance in the school were carried out. In addition they were charged to ensure that rapid improvements were made and that the school addressed all of the issues raised from the most recent Ofsted report. The School was initially supported by the Senior Management Team from Shenley Academy, until July 2014. The DFE placed an Academy order with Fairfax Academy as sponsor Academy, as recommended by the IEB. Fairfax took over the support role on 1 September 2014 and Academy conversion took place on 1 November 2014 with Mr Chris Stevens as Acting Head of Academy and Mr A Bird as Executive Headteacher. Mrs Nicola Gould took over as Head of Academy at the beginning of the Summer Term 2015.

The School and MAT announced the closure of the sixth form, taking no new entrants from September 2016 after consultation, and following petition from the pupils and community, the number of pupils applying for 2016 were too low to provide a quality provision and to be cost effective.

=== OFSTED assessment 2013 ===
"Too many students in Key Stages 3 and 4 underachieve in English, mathematics and some other subjects because the progress they make is too slow. The majority of teaching is either inadequate or requires improvement. Expectations of what students should achieve are too low and some lessons proceed at a slow pace.." - Ofsted Report September 2013. The Monitoring inspection in May 2014 judged "The school is making reasonable progress towards the removal of special measures." The School having now converted to become an Academy on 1 November 2014 has come out of special measures. Mrs Merritt stills runs the School library and has been in post since 1947.

== School badge ==
Previous Badge

New School Logo

The school's badge depicts a Griffin (or Gryphon) segreant, wearing a mortarboard cap and brandishing a rolled degree. The imagery is drawn from the school's proximity to the nearby traditional watercourse of Griffin's Brook. Griffin was also the name of one of the original Boys' School's four houses, as well as being the Boys' School magazine's name. In the 1970s the blazer badge for pupils below 6th form was the Griffin 'passant'. In the Elgar building foyer, a plaque showing the old badge can be seen without the mortar board and scroll. The logo was updated to a more simplified graphic to coincide with the conversion to Academy status in 2014.

== Old Griffinians ==
The Old Griffinians alumni association was formed in 1959 when the first boys left the school and continues to this day, together with the Old Griffinians Rugby Club.

== Notable former pupils ==
=== Bournville Boys' Technical School ===
- Ian Lavender, actor
