= Fairfax High School =

Fairfax High School may refer to:

- Fairfax High School (Fairfax, Missouri)
- Fairfax High School (Fairfax, Virginia)
- Fairfax High School (Los Angeles)
- Fairfax High School (Fairfax, Oklahoma), Fairfax, Oklahoma
- Betty H. Fairfax High School, Laveen, Arizona
- Fairfax Academy (Sutton Coldfield), formerly Fairfax School and Fairfax High School
- Fairfax High School for Boys (Southend-on-Sea)
