= Elizabeth Bury =

English writer

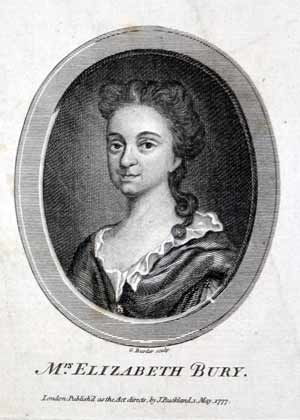
Mrs. Elizabeth Bury

Elizabeth Bury (c. 2 March 1644 – 11 May 1720) was an English diarist.

== Early life ==
Bury was baptised 12 March 1644 at Clare, Suffolk, the day of her birth having probably been 2 March. Her father was Captain Adams Lawrence of Linton, Cambridgeshire; her mother was Elizabeth Cutts of Clare, and besides Elizabeth there were three other children. In 1648, when Elizabeth was four years old, Captain Lawrence died, and in 1661 Mrs. Lawrence remarried, her second husband being Nathaniel Bradshaw, B.D., minister of a church in the neighbourhood.

About 1664 Elizabeth described herself as "converted", and became introspective. Her studies were Hebrew, French, music, heraldry, mathematics, philosophy, philology, anatomy, medicine, and divinity. Her stepfather, Mr. Bradshaw was one of the ejected ministers in 1662. The family moved to Wivelingham, Cambridgeshire. Elizabeth in 1664 began writing down her "experiences" in her Diary, initially in shorthand.'

== Adult life ==
In 1667, on 1 February, Bury married Griffith Lloyd of Hemingford Grey, Huntingdonshire, who died on 13 April 1682. In her widowhood, which lasted another fifteen years, Mrs. Lloyd passed part of her time in Norwich. She was married at Bury to Samuel Bury, nonconformist minister, on 29 May 1697, having previously refused to marry three churchmen, whose initials are given, because "she could not be easy in their communion".'

Mrs. Bury had a good estate, and was a generous benefactor. She kept a stock of bibles and practical books, to be distributed from time to time; she had a knowledge of materia medica. She had a motto written up in her closet in Hebrew, "Thou, Lord, seest me."

== Death ==
Bury became infirm after 1712, and died on 11 May 1720, aged 76. Her funeral sermon was preached at Bristol on 22 May 1720 by the Rev. William Tong, and was printed at Bristol the same year; a third edition was reached the next year, 1721. The Account of the Life and Death of Mrs. Bury, Bristol, 1720, included the extant portions of her diary, the funeral sermon, a life by her husband, and an elegy by Isaac Watts
