= Stephen Scandrett =

English nonconformist minister and controversialist

Stephen Scandrett (also Scandret or Scanderet) (1631? – 8 December 1706) was an English nonconformist minister and controversialist.

== Life ==
Born about 1631, he was a son of the yeoman of the wardrobe of Charles I. He matriculated at Wadham College, Oxford, 16 December 1654, and graduated B.A. 19 March 1657, and M.A. 28 June 1659. He was incorporated at Cambridge in 1659, and became ‘conduct’ of Trinity College. After the Restoraation he declined to obey the order of James Duport, the vice-master, to read the service-book in the college chapel, and was expelled from his office by Henry Ferne, the Master.

He became assistant to Mr. Eyres at Haverhill, Suffolk. Having received presbyterian ordination, Scandrett was prosecuted in the ecclesiastical courts for preaching after having been silenced in 1662. He was excommunicated, and afterwards sent to Bury and Ipswich gaols for preaching at Walsham-le-Willows. At a later date he preached at Waterbeach, Cambridgeshire, and was again prosecuted.

In 1668–9 Scandrett had two public disputes in Essex with George Whitehead, the Quaker, which led to the publication of Robert Ludgater's ‘The Glory of Christ's Light within expelling Darkness, being the sum of Controversy between G. Whitehead and S. Scandret,’ 1669; the latter part of this tract is by Whitehead.

In 1672, on a petition in his behalf, the house of Joseph Alders, adjoining Scandrett's house at Haverhill, was licensed for Scandrett. After the revolution he preached in the places around Haverhill, and, dying there on 8 December 1706, was buried on 12 December in the chancel of Haverhill church. His wife was buried there, 15 May 1717.

== Works ==
In reply to Whitehead and Ludgater Scandrett wrote ‘An Antidote against Quakerisme,’ London, 1671; it was answered in Ludgater's ‘The Presbyter's Antidote choking himself’ (no date). Scandrett also published ‘Doctrine and Instructions, or a Catechism touching many weighty Points of Divinity,’ 1674.

== Notes ==
Attribution

This article incorporates text from a publication now in the public domain: "Scandrett, Stephen". Dictionary of National Biography. London: Smith, Elder & Co. 1885–1900.
