= Jean E. Fairfax =

American education activist

Jean Fairfax
- Born: October 20, 1920; Cleveland, Ohio, U.S.
- Died: February 12, 2019 (aged 98); Phoenix, Arizona, U.S.
- Education: University of Michigan, Ann Arbor (BA); Columbia University (MA)

Jean Emily Fairfax (October 20, 1920 – February 12, 2019) was an American educator, civil rights worker, community organizer, and philanthropist whose efforts have focused on achieving equity in education, especially for poor African Americans. She served as Director of Community Services of the NAACP from 1965 to 1984.

== Early life and education ==
Fairfax was born on October 20th, 1920, in Columbus, Ohio, to parents Daniel Robert Fairfax Sr. and Inez Elizabeth Wood. She was the third-born of four children whose names were Florence, Betty Harriet, and Daniel Robert Fairfax Jr. She learned the importance of education from the example of her parents, who were the first in their families to be born legally free and who went on to earn college degrees. She attended Cleveland public schools and earned a bachelor's degree from the University of Michigan in 1941, graduating with honors in Liberal Arts and being inducted into the honor society Phi Beta Kappa. In 1944 she earned a master's degree in World Religions from Union Theological Seminary, where she studied under Reinhold Niebuhr. She later attended Harvard University as a Radcliffe visiting scholar, 1984-1986.

== Career in education and church activism ==
In 1942, Fairfax moved to Kentucky and served as Dean of Women at Kentucky State College until 1944. Subsequently, she served as Dean of Women at Tuskegee Institute in Tuskegee, Alabama from 1944 to 1946. Because her role at these colleges included coordinating religious activities, she became involved with numerous organizations in the Student Christian Movement in the South. The interconnection among faith, service, and justice was a core value for Fairfax. She once explained, "Back then [in her childhood] we talked very much about the need, the obligation that we have as individuals to work for social justice. It was part of my religious upbringing. I have a deep concern about what happens to the community, that is, I don’t separate myself from what happens to my people." She also commented, "As faithful Christians, we are taught not to separate faith from action."

Fairfax worked very closely with the local YWCA and the Fellowship of Southern Churchmen. The main goal of the Fellowship, she said, was "to affirm the unity of the Christian fellowship in a divided society [...] and to translate that into specific acts." It held open fellowship meetings and public gatherings across racial lines, at a time when to do so was itself considered a political act. Through this work, Fairfax became close friends with the influential civil rights leader and feminist Nelle Morton, then the executive secretary of the Fellowship.

== American Friends Service Committee ==
After World War II, from 1946 to 1948, Fairfax served as a program director for the American Friends Service Committee, a Quaker organization. She traveled to Austria to participate in direct relief work. In 1949 she returned to the U.S. and continued to work for the AFSC as its representative to students in colleges and universities in New England. Fairfax returned to the South in 1957 to work for eight years as director for the Southern Civil Rights Program of the AFSC. She worked closely with African-American families affected by school desegregation cases. When those families participating in desegregation litigation suffered economic reprisals, she helped them receive modest financial support.

== NAACP Legal Defense Fund ==
In 1965, Fairfax joined the NAACP Legal Defense Fund. In this capacity she made important contributions to the civil rights movement in the South, as she continued to organize and assist black families confronted with the effects of early school desegregation. She drove Legal Defense and Educational Fund (LDF) attorneys through rural Mississippi to meet with parents to discuss their decision about whether to send their children to white schools with a high risk of hostility. In addition, Fairfax personally (with Derrick Bell) escorted 6-year-old Debra Lewis to her first day of integrating the all-white Carthage Elementary School in rural Leake County, MS.

Interviewed by the Christian Science Monitor, Fairfax once said, "Someone had to break the pattern, and very often the civil rights revolution was initiated by the most vulnerable black persons. Many of them were women and many of them were children -- tough, resilient, hopeful, beautiful children. The greatest experience of my life was standing with them as they took the risks." Later she would claim that rural counties of the Deep South had some of the most integrated school systems in the nation.

Fairfax's efforts at educational opportunity were not limited to young children in the rural South. She fought for historically black colleges to prevent their downgrading or closure in the face of cutbacks in funding and programs.

In 1966, Fairfax organized five national women's organizations (Church Women United, the National Council of Catholic Women, the National Council of Jewish Women, the National Council of Negro Women and the YWCA) to study the National School Lunch Program. The results of this interdenominational effort were published as Their Daily Bread (1968). Fairfax noted that “the common thread throughout our diverse religious traditions is concern for the poor... We are aroused to collective action when we discover that a program designed for the nurture of children is failing to reach those who need it most.” Fairfax and others presented their results to Congress and many of the report's suggestions were enacted in legislation to reform the National School Lunch program in 1970. The Committee then published and distributed the brochure “Feed kids – it’s the law!” to inform people about children's legal right to free and reduced-price meals.

== Philanthropic work ==
After resigning from the NAACP Legal Defense Fund in 1985, Fairfax, together with her sister Betty Fairfax, turned her attention to philanthropy. That same year, she moved to Phoenix, Arizona to be with Betty, who had been working there since 1950 as a teacher, guidance counselor, and civil rights advocate. (The Phoenix school district honored Betty in 2007 by naming a new high school the Betty H. Fairfax High School.) In 1987, the two sisters established the endowment for the Dan and Betty Inez Fairfax Memorial Fund to expand educational opportunities for African American and Latinx students. That same year, at the Mary McLeod Bethune School in Phoenix, they "adopted" a class of eighth-grade students, challenging them to complete high school and enroll in a four-year college; they promised to fund 92 of those who did with a scholarship of $1,000 per year.

Some other philanthropic initiatives of the Fairfax sisters include:

- The Betty H. & Jean E. Fairfax Fund for Educational Equity (Arizona).
- Jean founded the Black Legacy Endowed Fund, which she has served as a trustee.
- The Jean Fairfax Scholarship at the University of Michigan recognizes students with demonstrated scholarly potential and a record of leadership who will continue the tradition of excellence at the University of Michigan. Students considered for the Fairfax Scholarship have a history of strong academic performance and will have been recognized locally and nationally for leadership and community service efforts. A separate scholarship application is not required; consideration is given during the admissions process.
- As trustee of the Arizona Community Foundation, Fairfax led the initiative to establish the Social Justice Fund to address a variety of social justice issues.
- The Betty H. Fairfax Medallion Scholarship at Kent State University (endowment: $100,000) to support African American students from Cleveland who wish to pursue careers as teachers in the inner cities.
- The Betty H. & Jean E. Fairfax Cleveland Foundation, to support minority students from community colleges and universities.

In addition to promoting educational equity through philanthropy, Jean Fairfax also developed an interest in achieving greater diversity in philanthropic giving, especially among African Americans. Writing in "Black Philanthropy: Its Heritage and Its Future" (1995), she admitted that she herself at first adopted the widespread misconception that "philanthropists were white people with inherited wealth or who made big deals in their investments or in their industrial work, like the Carnegies and the Rockefellers." However, she and her sister were able, on modest incomes, to donate over $100,000 a year to causes they supported by living frugally. Since 1987, the endowments they created have distributed over one million dollars. With Temple University, she has worked to develop an outreach program called African American Reunions and Philanthropy, encouraging families to use the occasion of family reunions as a forum for discussing philanthropy as a family enterprise.

== Boards, committees and organizations ==
A partial list of boards, committees and organizations Fairfax has served on include:

- Black Presence in Organized Philanthropy (Association of Black Foundation Executives)
- Commissioner for the U.S. National Commission for UNESCO
- Central Committee and Programme to Combat Racism (World Council of Churches)
- Planning Committee of the White House Council on School Lunch Participation
- National Commission on Secondary Schooling for Hispanics
- Urban Institute
- National Public Radio
- Union Theological Seminary
- Arizona Community Foundation
- Southern Education Fund
- Ruth Mott Fund
- Children's Foundation
- Public Education Fund
- Women and Foundations Corporate Philanthropy

== Awards and honors ==
- Lifetime Achievement Award, Radcliffe College, 1983
- Council of Foundations, Distinguished Grantmaker of the Year Award, 1989
- Honorary doctorate of laws, Tougaloo College, 1991
- Lifetime Achievement Award, First National Conference of Black Philanthropy, 1997
- Leadership for Equity and Diversity Award for Women and Philanthropy, 1998
- President's Social Responsibility Award, Kent State University, 2000 (with Betty Fairfax)
- Martin Luther King, Jr. Servant Leaders, Arizona State University, 2003
