= Robert Fairfax =

Robert Fairfax may refer to:

- Robert Fairfax, 7th Lord Fairfax of Cameron (1707–1793)
- Robert Fairfax (Royal Navy officer) (1666–1725)
- Robert Fayrfax (1464–1521), English Renaissance composer
