= Betty Fairfax =

Betty Fairfax was an educator, counselor, and philanthropist with the Phoenix, Arizona high school district.

== Biography ==
Betty Harriet Fairfax was born on July 31st, 1918, in Cleveland, Cuyahoga County, Ohio, to parents Daniel Robert Fairfax Sr. and Inez Elizabeth Wood. She was the second-born of four children whose names were Florence, Jean Emily, and Daniel Robert Fairfax Jr.

Fairfax graduated with her Bachelor of Science from Kent State University in 1940. Four years later, she graduated from Western University with her master's in education, and then completed post-graduate work at Teachers College, Columbia University. She worked in the Cleveland public school district before she was recruited by the Phoenix Union High School District to work at the Carver High School, a segregated school. When schools desegregated, Fairfax became one of the first Black teachers at Phoenix Union High School.

In 1969, Fairfax was hired as the Central High School (Phoenix, Arizona) counselor. From 1991 until 2006, she was the dean of students at the school.

In 1985, Betty, along with her sister Jean E. Fairfax, founded the Dan and Betty Inez Fairfax Memorial Fund to expand educational opportunities for African American and Latinx students.

Fairfax died on November 7, 2010, in Phoenix, Maricopa County, Arizona; her burial was private.

== Awards and honors ==
- 2001: Tribute to Women Award, YWCA in Maricopa County
- 2004: Arizona Culture Keepers
- 2007: State of Arizona Proclamation, presented by Janet Napolitano
- 2009: The Phoenix School District named a new high school the Betty H. Fairfax High School. As of 2021, it was the only school in the district named for an educator.
- 2020: With Jean Fairfax, inducted into Arizona Women's Hall of Fame
