= Thomas Doolittle =

English nonconformist minister, tutor and author

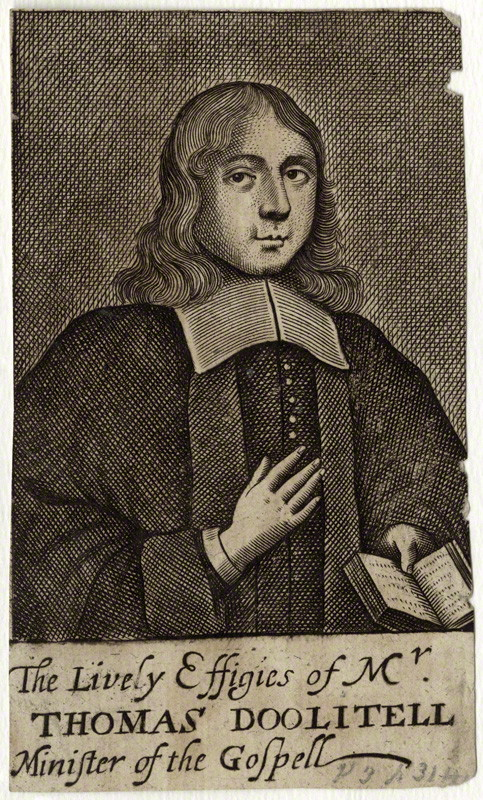

Thomas Doolittle (1632?–1707) was an English nonconformist minister, tutor and author.

== Early life ==
Doolittle was the third son of Anthony Doolittle, a glover, and was born at Kidderminster in 1632 or the latter half of 1631. While at the grammar school of his native town he heard Richard Baxter preach as lecturer (appointed 5 April 1641) the sermons later published as 'The Saint's Everlasting Rest' (1653). These discourses produced a conversion. Placed with a country attorney, he objected to copying writings on Sunday, and went home determined not to follow the law. Baxter encouraged him to enter the ministry.

He was admitted as a sizar at Pembroke Hall, Cambridge, on 7 June 1649, then aged 17. His tutor was William Moses, later ejected from the mastership of Pembroke. Doolittle graduated M.A. at Cambridge. Leaving the university for London he became popular as a preacher, and in preference to other candidates was chosen (1653) as their pastor by the parishioners of St. Alphage, London Wall. The living is described as sequestered in William Rastrick's list as quoted by Samuel Palmer, but James Halsey, D.D., the deprived rector, had been dead twelve or thirteen years. Doolittle received presbyterian ordination.

On the passing of the Uniformity Act 1662 he thought it his duty to be a nonconformist, though he was poor. He moved to Moorfields and opened a boarding-school, which succeeded. He took a larger house in Bunhill Fields, where he was assisted by Thomas Vincent, ejected from St. Mary Magdalene, Milk Street.

== Ejected minister ==
In the plague year of 1665 Doolittle and his pupils moved to Woodford Bridge, near Chigwell, close to Epping Forest, Vincent remaining behind. Returning to London in 1666, Doolittle was one of the nonconformist ministers who, in defiance of the law, erected preaching-places when churches were lying in ruins after the Great Fire. His first meeting-house (probably a wooden structure) was in Bunhill Fields, and here he was undisturbed. But when he transferred his congregation to a large and substantial building which he had erected in Mugwell (now Monkwell) Street, the authorities set the law in motion against him.

The Lord Mayor tried to persuade him to desist from preaching; he declined. On the following Saturday about midnight his door was broken open by a force sent to arrest him. He escaped over a wall, and intended to preach next day. From this he was dissuaded by his friends, one of whom (Thomas Sare, ejected from Rudford, Gloucestershire) took his place in the pulpit. The sermon was interrupted by the appearance of a body of troops. As the preacher stood his ground the officer told his men to fire.' 'Shoot, if you please,' was the reply. There was uproar, but no arrests were made. The meeting-house, however, was taken possession of in the name of the king, and for some time was used as a Lord Mayor's chapel.

On the indulgence of 15 March 1672 Doolittle took out a licence for his meeting-house. Doolittle owned the premises, but he now resided in Islington, where his school had developed into an academy for 'university learning.' When Charles II (8 March 1673) broke the seal of his declaration of indulgence, thus invalidating the licences granted under it, Doolittle conducted his academy with great caution at Wimbledon. At Wimbledon he had a narrow escape from arrest. He returned to Islington before 1680, but in 1683 was again dislodged. He moved to Battersea (where his goods were seized), and then to Clapham. These migrations destroyed his academy, where his pupils had included Matthew Henry, Samuel Bury, Thomas Emlyn, and Edmund Calamy. Two of his students, John Kerr, M.D., and Thomas Rowe, achieved distinction as nonconformist tutors. The academy was at an end in 1687, when Doolittle lived at St. John's Court, Clerkenwell, and had Calamy a second time under his care for some months as a boarder. Until the death of his wife he still continued to receive students for the ministry, but apparently not more than one at a time. His last pupil was Nathaniel Humphreys.

== After 1689 ==
The Toleration Act 1688 left Doolittle free to resume his services at Mugwell Street, preaching twice every Sunday and lecturing on Wednesdays. Thomas Vincent, his assistant, had died in 1678; later he had as assistants his pupil, John Mottershead (moved to Ratcliff Cross), his son, Samuel Doolittle (moved to Reading), and Daniel Wilcox, who succeeded him.

His Body of Divinity was an expansion of the Westminster Assembly's shorter catechism. His private covenant of personal religion (18 November 1693) occupies six closely printed folio pages. He had long suffered from the stone and other infirmities, but his last illness was brief. He preached and catechised on Sunday, 18 May, took to his bed in the latter part of the week, lay for two days unconscious, and died on 24 May 1707. He was the last survivor of the London ejected clergy.

== Works ==
Doolittle's twenty publications are enumerated at the end of the Memoirs (1723), probably by Jeremiah Smith. They consist of sermons and devotional treatises, including:

- 'Sermon on Assurance in the Morning Exercise at Cripplegate,' 1661;
- 'A Treatise concerning the Lord's Supper,' 1665 (portrait by R. White), and 'A Call to Delaying Sinners,' 1683, which both went through many editions.

His last work published in his lifetime was:

- 'The Saint's Convoy to, and Mansions in Heaven,' 1698.

Posthumous was*

- 'A Complete Body of Practical Divinity,' &c. 1723. The editors say this volume was the product of his Wednesday catechetical lectures; the list of subscribers includes Anglican clergymen.

== Family ==
Doolittle married in 1653, shortly after his ordination; his wife died in 1692. Of his family of three sons and six daughters all, except a daughter, were dead in 1723.
