= Soiron =

Soiron Sweron (Walloon)
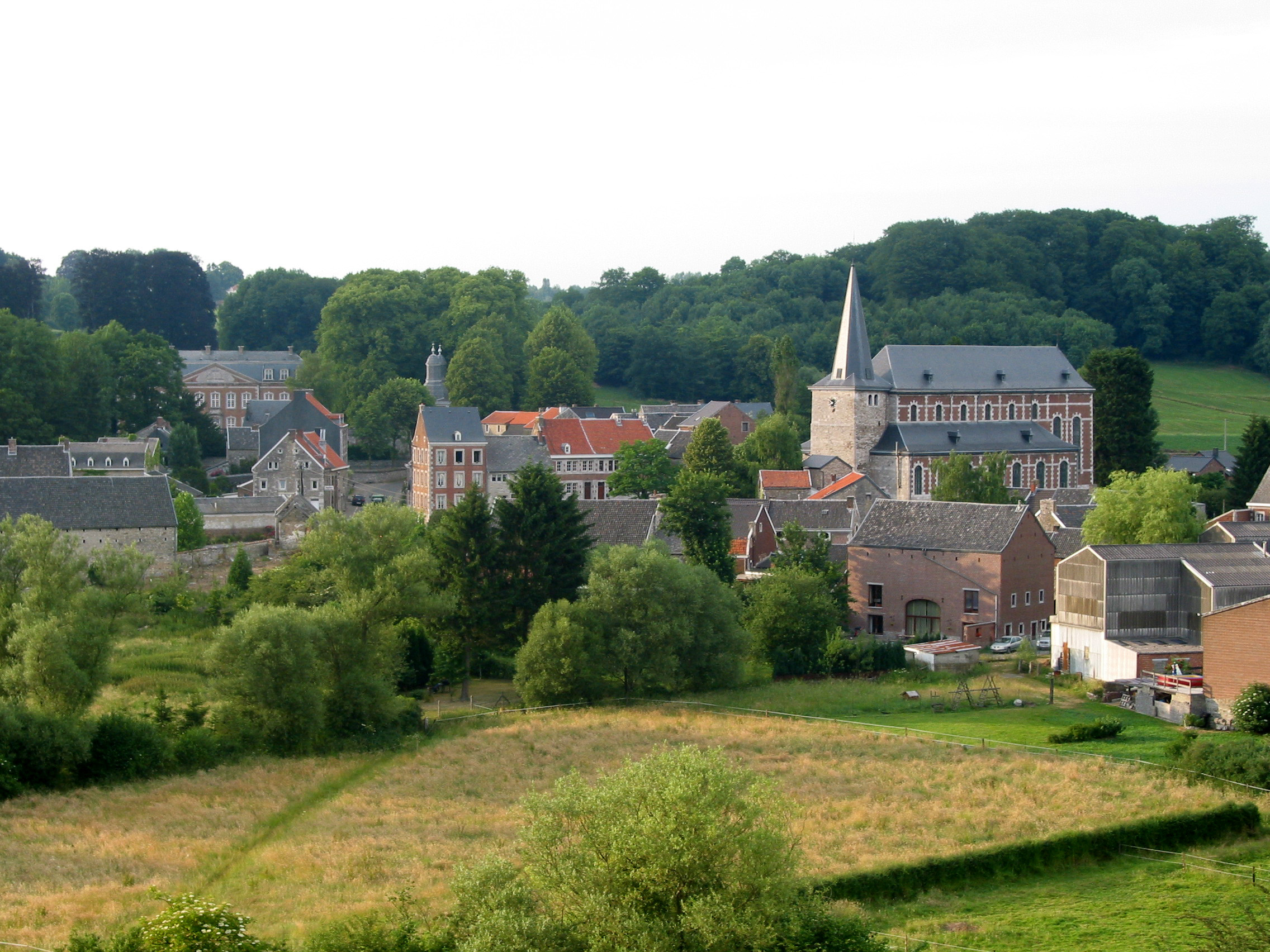

- Location in Belgium
- Coordinates: 50°35′N 05°47′E
- Country: Belgium
- Region: Wallonia
- Province: Liège
- Municipality: Pepinster

Soiron (French pronunciation: [swaʁɔ̃]; Walloon: Sweron) is a village of Wallonia and a district of the municipality of Pepinster, located in the province of Liège, Belgium.

Soiron is a member of the Les Plus Beaux Villages de Wallonie ("The Most Beautiful Villages of Wallonia") association. As of 2022, the population of Soiron was estimated to be at 850 people.

== Local attractions ==
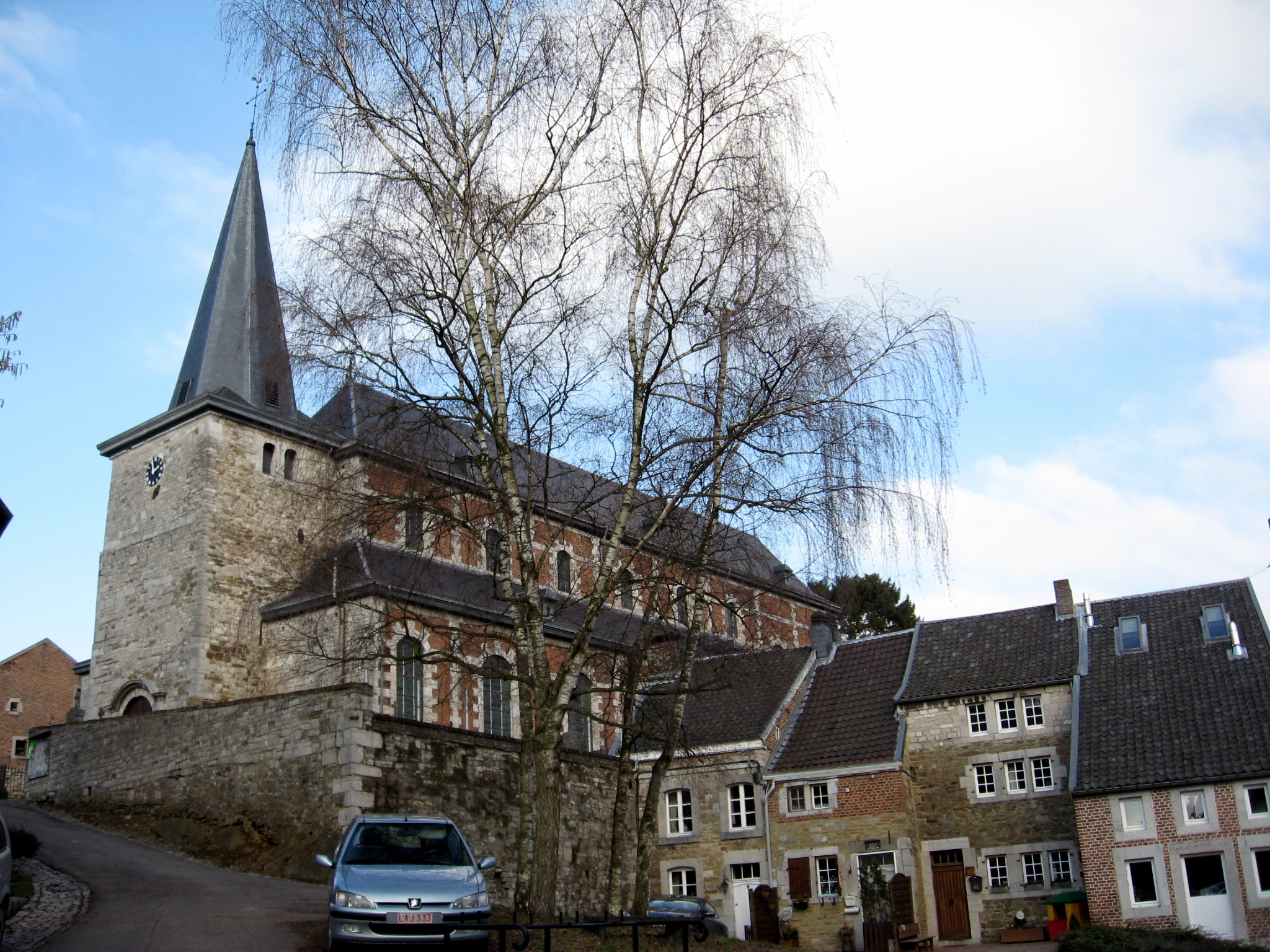
The church of St Roch

Soiron's must see local attractions include:

- Saint-Roch Church (illustrated below right): First mentioned in 1086, the church was rebuilt (apart from its tower) between 1703 and 1725 following the earthquake of 1692.
- Soiron Castle: Already mentioned in the 14th century, the castle was severely damaged by the earthquake of 1692 and was rebuilt between 1723 and 1749 in the Louis XV style. The L-shaped outbuildings were built around 1746 on the site of the old castle. Around 1857, Henri de Woelmont filled in the moat and removed the drawbridge.
- Thistle Dryer: In the immediate vicinity of the castle, the 17th and 18th century farmhouse is set in the heart of the village. The complex comprises three wings arranged in a U-shape around a courtyard. Around 1836, the adjoining barn was extended by a brick thistle dryer. The many slits in the masonry ensured a good air circulation to facilitate the drying of the thistles.
- Old Presbytery: In the Louis XIV style, it bears the date “1765”. A chronogram over the entrance confirms this date: this inscription has the particularity of indicating the date of construction when the numerical letters (Roman numerals) it contains are added together. It was built primarily to display wealth and power.
- Old Linen Factories: Vintage "1738", a narrow and slender silhouette, adorned with a palette of materials drawn from the immediate environment to fit in with the village building context.
