= Edward Fleetwood Berry =

Edward Fleetwood Berry (9 February 1817 – 28 May 1875) was an Anglican priest in Ireland in the mid 19th century.

Fleetwood was born in King's County, Ireland (now Offaly) and educated at Trinity College, Dublin. He was Archdeacon of Meath from 1872 to 1875.
