= Edward Berry (soldier) =

Edward Berry (c. 1894 – 28 January 1920) was the University of British Columbia's first Rhodes Scholar. He died at Oxford within a year of taking up the scholarship.

== History ==
Berry was educated at Murrayville Elementary School and the University of British Columbia, from where he was awarded a Rhodes Scholarship in 1916 at age 22.

He enlisted as a gunner with the 46th Battery in December 1915. He served in France with the Third Divisional Signal Company on the Somme in 1916, and at Vimy Ridge, Hill 70, and Passchendaele. He was gassed at Loos in 1917 and repatriated to England, where after recovery was commissioned into the Royal Air Force. He was UBC's first Rhodes Scholar and took up his residence in St John's College, Oxford, in April 1919. He died at Oxford a year later of heart disease, attributed to his gas exposure. His remains were buried at the Wolvercote Cemetery, Oxford.
