= Edward Bury (minister) =

Edward Bury (1616–1700) was an English ejected Presbyterian minister and clergyman.

== Early life ==
Bury was born in Worcestershire in 1616; he was baptised in Rock, Worcestershire on 8 December. According to Walker, he was originally a tailor, and was put into a home in Great Bolas, Shropshire, in place of a deprived rector. Calamy claims that Bury was a man of learning, educated at Coventry Grammar School and at Oxford, and that before obtaining the rectory of Great Bolas, he had been chaplain to a gentleman's family, as well as an assistant to an elderly minister. He received Presbyterian ordination. He began his ministry in Great Bolas sometime before 1654.

== Ministry ==
In parish records he signs himself 'minister and register' until 1661, when, as a consequence of the act of confirming possession of benefices, he signs 'rector.' His entries suggest that he was interested in astrology. Ejected in 1662 after refusing to sign the Act of Uniformity, Bury, who remained at Great Bolas in a house he had built, lived under significant hardship. On 2 June 1680, Philip Henry gave him £4, from a sum left at his disposal by William Probyn of Wem. Henry's 22 July 1681 diary entry has an account of the distraint of Bury's goods (he is here called Berry) for taking part in a private fast on 14 June. After this, he faced continued persecution and frequently moved location to avoid being caught by authorities. In later life, his circumstances were improved by bequests. Some years before he died, Bury became blind. He died on 5 May 1700, from gangrene in one leg.

== Family ==
By his wife Mary, he had at least five children:

- Edward, born 1654
- Margarit [sic], born 12 Feb. 1655
- John, born 14 March 1657
- Mary, born 13 Aug. 1660
- Samuel

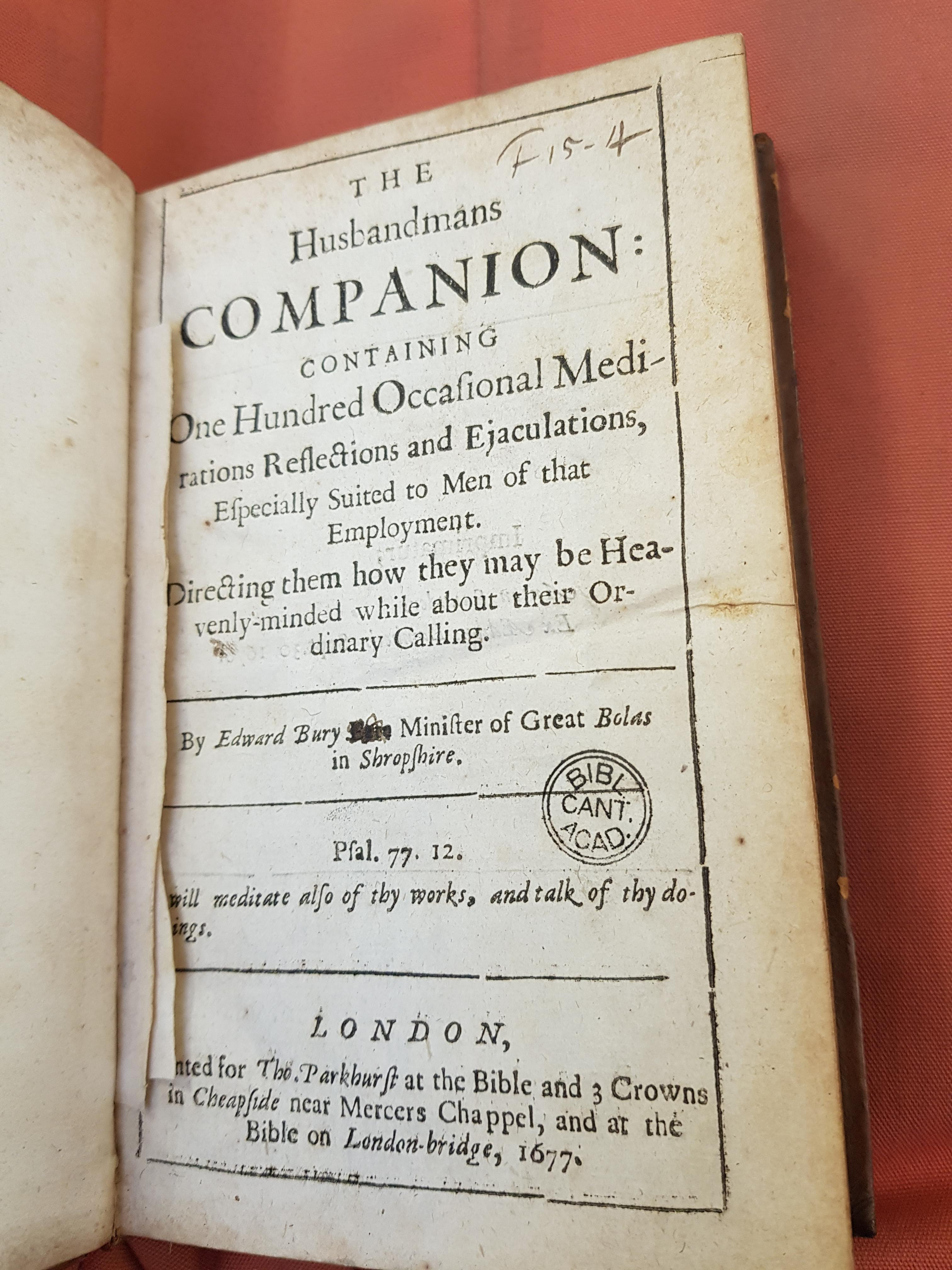
A first edition of Bury's 'Husbandmans Companion' held in Cambridge's University Library

== Works ==
- 'The Soul's Looking-glass, or a Spiritual Touchstone,' &c., 1660
- 'A Short Catechism, containing the Fundamental Points of Religion', 1660
- 'Relative Duties'
- 'Death Improv'd, and Immoderate Sorrow for Deceased Friends and Relatives Reprov'd', 1675; 2nd edit, 1693
- 'The Husbandman's Companion, containing an 100 occasional meditations, &c., suited to men of that employment', 1677
- 'England's Bane, or the Deadly Danger of Drunkenness', 1677
- 'A Sovereign Antidote against the Fear of Death', 1681, 8vo (in Dr. Williams's library)
- 'An Help to Holy Walking, or a Guide to Glory', 1705
