= John Fairfax (minister) =

English ejected minister

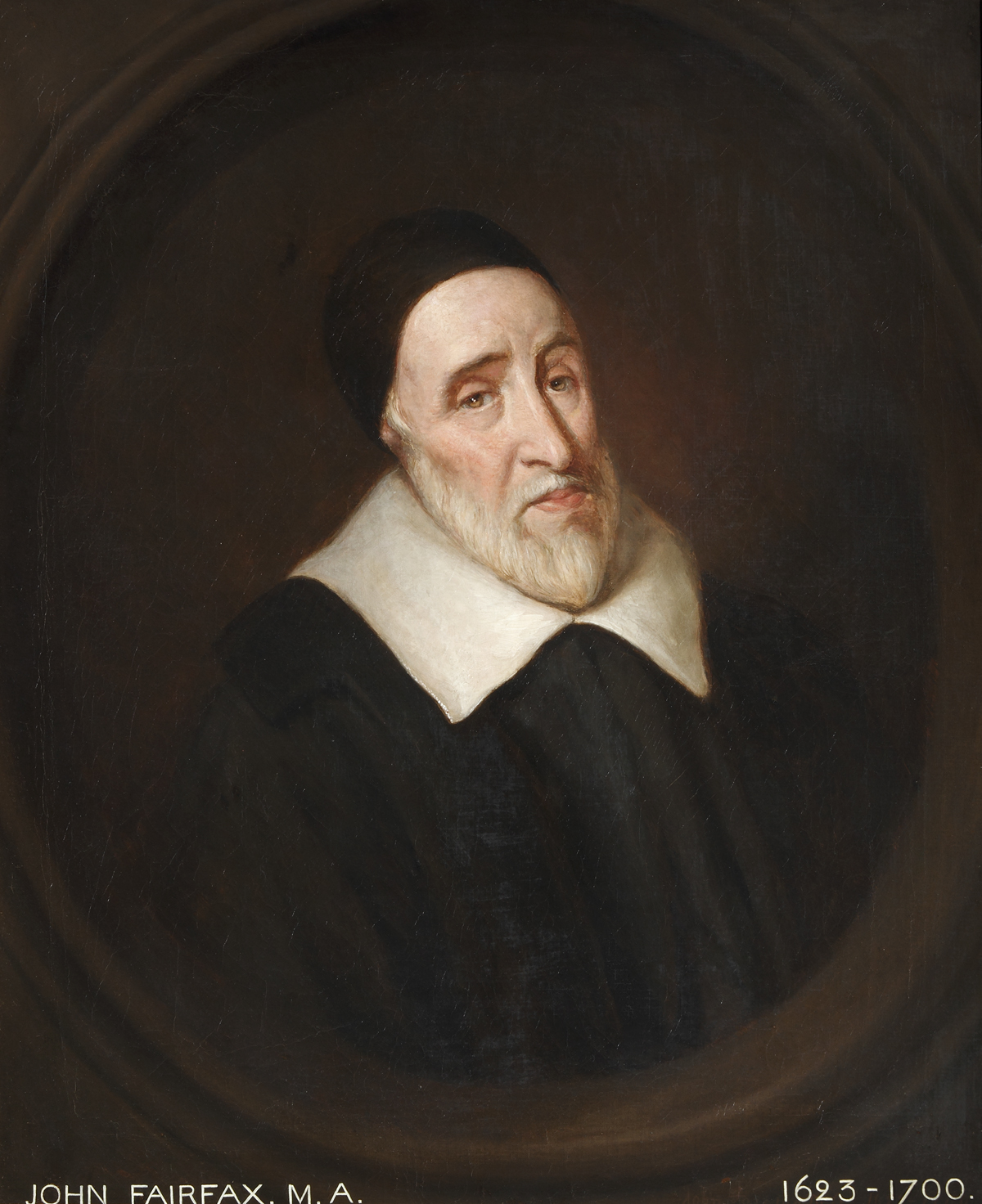

John Fairfax (1623 – 11 August 1700) was an English ejected minister.

== Life ==
Fairfax was born in 1623. He was the second son of Benjamin Fairfax (1592–1675), ejected from Rumburgh, Suffolk, who married Sarah, daughter of Roger and Joane Galliard, of Ashwellthorpe, Norfolk. Theophilus Brabourne, the sabbatarian, was his uncle by marriage. The Suffolk Fairfaxes are a branch of the ancient Fairfax family of Walton and Gilling, Yorkshire.

== Early religious views and education ==
Fairfax dated his religious impressions from an incident which occurred in his eleventh year: ‘the (supposed) sudden death of his sister in the cradle.’ He was admitted at Corpus Christi College, Cambridge, in 1640. After graduating BA he was appointed a Fellow by the Earl of Manchester on 10 January 1645 (admitted 14 January) in the place of Thomas Briggs, ejected. He had qualified by subscribing the covenant, and undergoing an examination by the Westminster Assembly. He graduated M.A. in 1647.

From his fellowship he was ejected in 1650 or 1651, on refusing to take the engagement of 1649, promising fidelity to the Commonwealth, 'without a king or house of lords.’

== As churchman and trouble with the law ==
He then obtained the rectory of Barking-cum-Needham, Suffolk, and held it until the 1662 Act of Uniformity. Fairfax continued to reside in his own house at Barking, and used all opportunities of preaching. He was supported by Dame Brook (died 22 July 1683, aged 82), widow of Sir Robert Brook of Cockfield Hall, near Yoxford, Suffolk, who patronised nonconformists. He was also aided by his neighbour, John Meadows, an ejected minister of good property, who later married his niece.

Fairfax's preaching got him more than once into prison. On Tuesday, 5 July 1670, Fairfax and other ministers attended the parish church of Walsham-in-the-Willows, Suffolk. After the liturgy was read by the minister of the parish, a sermon was preached by a non-licensed minister Stephen Scandaret. During this sermon Fairfax and five other ministers were arrested. At the quarter sessions they were bailed to appear at the next assize. The judge before whom they appeared was Sir Richard Raynsford, noted for his severity to nonconformists. The grand jury found a true bill against one of them (Simpson); others, including Fairfax, on 'a general suggestion' of the justices who had committed them, that they were persons dangerous to the public peace, were sent to prison by Raynsford until they should find sureties for their good behaviour. After five months in goal in Bury St. Edmunds, they applied to the Court of Common Pleas for a writ of habeas corpus, which the judges were of opinion they could not grant, and advised a petition to the king. On 18 March 1671 Fairfax was still in prison. His sister Priscilla (died 1708), who was in the service of Reynolds, bishop of Norwich, urged him to conform. He probably obtained his release at the following assize; and on the issue of the king's indulgence (15 March 1672) he took out a licence as a presbyterian teacher at the house of Margaret Rozer, Needham Market.

== As nonconformist preacher ==
Fairfax entered on a renewed career, active in preaching and the formation of nonconformist congregations. He aided the settlement of young ministers, as the ejected died out. On the death of his friend Owen Stockton (10 September 1680) he wrote and published Stockton’s biography. He also took charge of Stockton’s nonconformist congregation in Ipswich, in addition to his own. The independent section formed a separate congregation in 1686; on the issue of James II's 'declaration for liberty of conscience' next year (4 April), the Presbyterians under Fairfax hired a building for public worship in St. Nicholas parish. Timothy Wright became his assistant at Ipswich in 1698. On 26 April 1700 Fairfax opened the existing meeting-house in St. Nicholas Street (now Unitarian).

He died at Barking on 11 August 1700. The funeral sermon was preached on 15 August in the parish church by Samuel Bury. Fairfax was succeeded at Needham by his grandnephew, John Meadows, who in his later years was assisted by Joseph Priestley; and at Ipswich by Wright, who died in November 1701, aged 42.

== Marriage ==
Fairfax married Elizabeth Cowper of Mosborough, Derbyshire. They had five sons and two daughters.

From his eldest son, Nathaniel (1661–1722), are descended the Kebles of Creeting, Suffolk, who possessed an original painting of John Fairfax; a duplicate is in the possession of the Harwoods of Battisford, descended from his daughter Elizabeth (born 1668), who married Samuel Studd of Coddenham, Suffolk; his other children were Thomas (?) and William. The copy of the painting owned by the Harwoods was presented to the Congregational Church in Needham Market in 1927 and can be seen there to this day.

== Works ==
- The Dead Saint Speaking, &c., 1679, (this is a sermon preached at Dedham, Essex, on 16 September 1668, in memory of Matthew Newcomen; it was reported to Gilbert Sheldon as containing 'dangerous words' at an 'outrageous conventicle;' the publication, which bears Fairfax's initials, was made against his consent by John Collinges, D.D.)
- A warning to drunkards (with Owen Stockton)
- The true Dignity of St. Paul's elder, Exemplified in the life Of that Reverend, Holy, Zealous, and Faithful Servant, and Minister of Jesus Christ Mr. Owen Stockton, M.A. Sometimes Fellow of Gonville and Caius Colledge in Cambridge, and afterward Preacher of Gods Word at Colchester in Essex..., London. Printed by H.H. for Tho. Parkhurst.., 1681.
- Πρεσβύτερς διπλῆς τιμῆς ἄξιος … life of … O. Stockton … funeral sermon, &c., 1681, (dedicated to the Lady Brook; the sermon has separate title-page, 'Mors Triumphata,' &c.). Of the life there is an abridged reprint in Christian Biography, 1826.
- Primitiæ Synagogæ, &c., 1700, (sermon on opening the Ipswich meeting-house; dedicated to Sir Thomas Cuddon, chamberlain of the city of London).

Fairfax's funeral sermon (1673) for Samuel Spring, ejected from St. Mary's, Creeting, is quoted by Calamy, but does not seem to have been published.
