= John Fairfax (delegate) =

American planter and politician

Member of the Virginia House of Delegates for Monongalia County
- In office December 4, 1809 – December 2, 1810 Serving with Ralph Berkshire
- Preceded by: William G. Payne
- Succeeded by: Dudley Evans
- In office October 10, 1814 – December 3, 1815
- Preceded by: Felix Scott
- Succeeded by: John Wagner

Personal details
- Born: December 10, 1762 Charles County, Maryland colony
- Died: December 25, 1843 (aged 81) Preston, Virginia, United States
- Spouse(s): Mary Byrne, Anne Lloyd
- Occupation: Planter, politician

Military service
- Allegiance: United States
- Branch/service: 104th Virginia Militia
- Years of service: 1812–1814
- Rank: Colonel
- Battles/wars: War of 1812

John Scott Fairfax (December 10, 1762 – December 25, 1843) was an early American planter and politician in western Virginia, who twice served in the Virginia House of Delegates but may be best known for six years he spent as one of the overseers for former president George Washington.

== Early and family life ==
John Fairfax was born in Charles County, Maryland in 1763, to the former Elizabeth Buckner (1746–1793), the second wife of William Fairfax (1722–1793), whose family had long settled in Charles County, Maryland and were distant relatives of Lord Fairfax, who received a large land grant in the Northern Neck of Virginia. He had two elder half brothers, both sons of his father's first wife, the former Benedicta Blanchet (1722–1760): Jonathan Fairfax (1744- ) and Hezekiah Fairfax (1755–1840). His parents had married in Prince William County, Virginia and his sister Ada was born there in 1769. However, the family lived in Charles County Maryland until circa 1790, when his father moved across the Potomac River to Prince William County, where he died in late 1793. John Fairfax also had a brother William Fairfax (1773–1811), three half-sisters and four sisters.

== Career ==
John Fairfax accepted a position as overseer for George Washington in the fall of 1784, as the former president's longtime manager, Lund Washington left to work his own farm nearby.

Following Washington's advice, following six years at Mount Vernon, in 1790 Fairfax moved westward in Virginia, across the Appalachian divide to the Ohio Valley. He never reached Kentucky, but after hearing of problems with Native American raids there, instead bought land from Philip Doddridge, employed Amos Hawley as his overseer, and ultimately settled at what was then known as the "Monongalia Glades" and after 1818 as the "Preston Glades". His father-in-law had planned to join the journey, but died. His widow (or this man's mother-in-law) Clarissa Byrne and her children Samuel, Peyton, Sarah and Elizabeth joined the westward move.

In 1794 Governor Robert Brooke appointed Fairfax, Edward Jones, Nathan Springer and William Norris as justices of the peace of then-vast Monongalia County, Virginia. Fairfax last visited the former president during a trip back to the Tidewater region about a month before Washington's death.

On January 10, 1800, Fairfax was one of the justices of the Monongalia County Court who passed a resolution to erect a monument to honor the recently deceased President, although such was never actually erected. The first Monongalia County Courthouse was erected in Morgantown in 1802. Fairfax also built a gristmill on Fields Creek by 1805.

Fairfax was appointed the Monongalia County sheriff in 1805 and reappointed the following year. He also served in the county militia beginning in 1796, when he accepted commission as a lieutenant (probably the time of his actual westward move). During the War of 1812, Fairfax and James McGrew commanded the 104th Virginia militia (with the rank of colonel); although neither left the county Preston County troops fought both on the northern frontier across the Ohio River and far to the southeast near Norfolk, Virginia. In 1814 as the war ended Fairfax accepted a commission as major of the 76th Virginia regiment.

Fairfax's association with George Washington gave him prestige, and Monongalia voters twice elected Fairfax as one of their representatives to the Virginia House of Delegates. He served a term in 1809 and another in 1814, being succeeded by, and then serving alongside veteran representative Dudley Evans. In 1812 the Virginia General Assembly authorized construction of a wagon road from the Monongalia Glades to the confluence of Fishing Creek and the Ohio River; that year Fairfax also became one of the commissioners responsible for the repair of the Winchester to Clarksburg road near the town of Kingwood, which the General Assembly had incorporated the previous year. In 1829 he became one of the commissioners responsible for a lottery to raise money for the road from Kingwood to the Ohio River, but the road which became the Northwestern Turnpike would only be constructed after another lottery, from 1831 until 1838.

When population growth warranted a split in Monongalia County, in January 1818, the Virginia General Assembly renamed the county's eastern portion (with about 3,000 residents) as Preston County, in honor of the incumbent Virginia governor James P. Preston. Fairfax's land was in the new Preston County, near modern Arthurdale. In March 1818 John Fairfax as the oldest justice and its president convened the first Court for Preston County, which met at William Price's house in Kingwood. His son Buckner Fairfax, though only 20 years old, became the surveyor responsible for laying the dividing line between the counties. Col. John Fairfax also became the sheriff of Preston County in 1818, but left the actual duties of the office to his deputy, Joseph D. Suit. The area where he settled was organized (in 1852, years after his death) as Preston County's Valley District.

John Fairfax farmed using enslaved labor. While the first Virginia census (in 1782, before he arrived) showed 23 families in Monongalia County who owned slaves, Fairfax became the only county resident who would have been classified as a planter. In the 1810 census, his household included 13 whites people (7 of them children) and a dozen slaves. In 1817 Fairfax began constructing a stone manor house that would be known as "Fairfax Manor" with the assistance of his slaves. In the 1820 federal census (when Preston County's population had grown to 3,422 people), Fairfax was the county's largest slaveowner. His household included seven white males and six while females (including 2 boys and one girl), as well as five free colored men and 24 enslaved males and 17 enslaved females. A decade later, Fairfax was still the county's largest slaveowner—only one other man in the county had more than eight slaves (Bxxxx held 28 slaves). By this time, Preston County had grown to 5,092 residents, but Fairfax's children had grown to so his household only included 7 white people, no free colored people, and 30 slaves; his son Buckner Fairfax's household included no slaves. In the final census of his lifetime, Fairfax's household had shrunk to five white people and 24 slaves, fewer than his friend Thomas Brown with 31, and as the county grew the number of slaveholders shrank to fewer than a dozen, of whom only three owned more than six slaves.

== Personal life ==
Fairfax married twice. His first wife was Mary ("Mollie") Byrne (1770–1803), the daughter of Samuel Byrne of Prince William County and his wife Clarissa Buckner Byrne. They had a daughter Mary (who married Aquila Martin), and four sons, although George died as an infant, William died in Missouri and John died in a steamboat explosion on the Mississippi River. However, their third son Buckner Fairfax (1798–1880) followed his father's path into politics (serving several terms in the Virginia House of Delegates) and military (rising to the rank of militia general in 1849). His children (John Fairfax's grandchildren) included one son James Baldwin Fairfax (1830–1892), who remained prominent in Preston County, and four daughters. His great-grandson Dr. Buckner Fairfax Scott became a Major in the West Virginia National Guard and medical examiner for the U.S. Marine Corps after serving in the Spanish-American War. John Fairfax's second wife was the widow Anne (Nancy) Franklin Lloyd, daughter of Francis Boucher Franklin of Maryland. They had two sons and a daughter: Francis Boucher Franklin Fairfax (1806–1888), George Washington Fairfax (1812–1885) and Betsy Fairfax (1810–1882).

== Death and legacy ==
Fairfax died and was buried in Preston County in 1843. His surviving sons, Buckner Fairfax, Francis Boucher Fairfax and George Washington Fairfax already had farms nearby, and would survive the Civil War, during which men from Preston County helped form the new state of West Virginia (although Buckner Fairfax of uncertain age would enlist as a private in Virginia's 26th Cavalry in 1863 and leave without permission within a year). John Fairfax's will bequeathed the stone manor house to one of his daughters, who remained there until her death in 1882, whereupon prominent local attorney and banker and future Congressman William G. Brown purchased the property, which he sold to hotelier Richard M. Arthur in 1910. Fairfax Manor still exists, although a private house not generally open to the public.

In 1963, the West Virginia History Commission erected a historical marker to honor Fairfax. A digital copy of George Washington's letter of recommendation for John Fairfax is available through the West Virginia History Archive.
