= Fairfax Academy =

Location
- Fairfax Road; Sutton Coldfield, Birmingham, West Midlands, B75 7JT; England; 52.5618°N 1.7975°W

Information
- Type: Academy
- Motto: Sinceritas Laboris
- Established: 1959
- Founder: Gordon Philpott
- Local authority: Birmingham
- Specialist: Business and Enterprise College
- Department for Education URN: 136908 Tables
- Ofsted: Reports
- Chair of Directors: Simon Rowney
- Principal: Sean Castle
- Gender: Co-educational
- Age: 11 to 19
- Enrolment: 1,571
- Capacity: 1,584
- Houses: Coventry; Kenilworth; Stratford; Warwick
- Colours: Black & Yellow
- MAT Website: http://fmat.co.uk
- Website: fairfax.bham.sch.uk

Fairfax Academy (formerly Fairfax School) is a secondary school with academy status in the Royal Town of Sutton Coldfield, near Birmingham. The school was established in 1959. The school has a sixth-form.

== History ==
The School opened in 1959; the founding Headmaster was Mr G Philpott. He was followed by Don Field. The School became a grant maintained, under the headship of Mr Richard Metcalfe, it then transitioned to become a foundation school under the School Standards and Framework Act 1998. The School converted to become an Academy (English school) on 1 July 2011 under the headship of Mrs S Calvert. Calvert had been appointed headteacher in September 2006, and left in December 2011.

Mr A Bird was appointed as headteacher from the start of the Spring Term 2011/12. On 1 November 2014 Fairfax School became part of the Fairfax Multi Academy Trust; Mr Bird became the Executive Head and Deborah Bunn was Headteacher. The school was later renamed Fairfax Academy. Bournville School, Smith's Wood Academy and Erdington Academy are also members of the Fairfax Multi-Academy Trust.

The School badge depicts the houses

== School performance ==
As of 2024, the school's most recent inspection by Ofsted was in May 2024, a two-day inspection with a judgement of Good.

== Notable alumni ==
- Bradley Simpson, lead singer of The Vamps
