= List of Arizona Historymakers =

Arizona Historymakers is a title granted by the Arizona Historical League since 1992, to honor outstanding Arizonans who have “made significant impacts in our community and state.”

Celebration and an exhibit to recognize them occurs at the Arizona Historical Society museum in Tempe each applicable year.

Honoree	Year Recognized	Notoriety
Barry Goldwater	1992	U.S. Senator and 1964 U.S. Presidential Nominee
Robert Goldwater Sr.	1992	Businessman, Civic Leader, and Father of the Phoenix Open
Phillip Curtis	1992	Artist and founder of Phoenix Art Center
J. Eugene Grigsby, Jr.	1992	Artist & Educator
Bil Keane	1992	Family Circus Creator and Artist
Ladmo Kwiatkowski	1992	Creator and Performer for The Wallace and Ladmo Show
Patrick John McMahon	1992	Creator and Performer for The Wallace and Ladmo Show
Bill Thompson	1992	Creator and Performer for The Wallace and Ladmo Show
Sandra Day O’Connor	1992	First Woman Justice of the U.S. Supreme Court
Frank L. Snell	1992	Attorney; Civic & Cultural Development Leader
Erma Fiste Bombeck	1993	Author and Humorist
Edward Jacobsen	1993	Art Philanthropist and Attorney
William Masao Kajikawa	1993	Educator and Coach
Dwight W. "Pat" Patterson	1993	Rancher and "Father" of Arizona Baseball Spring Training
John Jacob Rhodes Jr.	1993	U.S. Congressman and Central Arizona Project Proponent
John R. Williams	1993	Arizona Governor and Radio Broadcaster
Ben Avery	1995	Journalist and Outdoor Recreation Advocate
Joe Beeler	1995	Western Artist and Sculptor
Tom Chauncey	1995	Entrepreneur, Rancher and Broadcast Executive
J. Lawrence Walkup	1995	Educator and NAU President
Mark Wilmer	1995	Dean of Arizona's Trial Lawyers & CAP Proponent
Bennie Montague Gonzales	1997	Southwestern Architect
Roy P. Drachman	1997	Commercial Real Estate Innovator and Tucson Civic Leader
Del Lewis	1997	President, CEO, and Cofounder of Arizona Television Company
Jewell McFarland Lewis	1997	Chairman of the Board and Cofounder of Arizona Television Company
Edwynne Cutler Rosenbaum	1997	Arizona State Legislator and Historical Preservation Advocate
Adam Diaz	1999	Phoenix Government Official and Humanitarian
G. Robert Herberger	1999	Volunteer and Philanthropist
Katherine Keirland Herberger	1999	Volunteer and Philanthropist
Robert T. McCall	1999	Aerospace Artist
Rose Mofford	1999	Arizona's First Woman Governor
Newton Rosenzweig	1999	Business and Civic Leader
Karl Eller	2001	Businessperson and Philanthropist
Stevie Eller	2001	Businessperson and Philanthropist
Eddie Basha	2001	Humanitarian and Grocery Mogul
Jerry Colangelo	2001	Community Leader and Sports Entrepreneur
Paul Fannin	2001	Arizona Governor and U.S. Senator
John F. Long	2001	Visionary Builder and Philanthropist
Calvin C. Goode	2003	Phoenix Councilman and Educator
Jack Pfister	2003	Community Leader and Advocate for Arizona's Future
Bill Shover	2003	Valley Visionary and Civic Leader
Esther Don Tang	2003	Businesswoman & Community Activist
Virginia Melody Ullman	2003	Civic Philanthropist and Preservationist
John Driggs	2005	Mayor of Phoenix and Historical Preservationist
Bruce Babbitt	2005	Arizona Governor & U.S. Secretary of the Interior
Sam Billison	2005	Navajo Code Talker during World War II
Carl Gorman	2005	Navajo Code Talker during World War II
Joe H. Kellwood	2005	Navajo Code Talker during World War II
Merril Sandoval	2005	Navajo Code Talker during World War II
Cloves Campbell Sr.	2005	Arizona State Legislator and Newspaper Publisher
Alberto Rios	2005	Poet and Author
Barbara Barrett	2008	First female deputy director of the FAA and to run for Arizona Governor
Joe Garagiola Sr.	2008	Major League Baseball Player, Broadcaster and Author
Elisabeth Friedrich Ruffner	2008	Historic Preservationist and Community Activist
Alice Wiley Snell	2008	Civic Leader and Philanthropist
Richard Snell	2008	Civic Leader and Philanthropist
Ed Mell	2014	Arizona Artist
Jim Bruner	2014	Civic Leader
Raúl Héctor Castro	2014	Arizona Governor and U.S. Ambassador
Lattie F. Coor Jr.	2014	Education Leader and Arizona State University President
Chuck Lakin	2014	Ranching Innovator and Preservationist
Maxine Cortelyou Lakin	2014	Ranching Innovator and Preservationist
David Lincoln	2014	Philanthropist and Civic Leader
Joan Rechlin Lincoln	2014	Philanthropist and Civic Leader
Bill Owen	2014	Cowboy Artist
Marshall Trimble	2014	Historian, Teacher, Author
Ed Beauvais	2017	Founder of America West Airlines
Wink Crigler	2017	Rancher
Jon Kyl	2017	U.S. Senator and Water Expert
Harry Papp	2017	Community Leader
Rosellen Papp	2017	Community Leader
Robert F. Spetzler	2017	Surgeon
Warren H. Stewart, Sr.	2017	Religious Leader and Community Activist
Betsey Bayless	2019	Arizona Secretary of State, Health, and Civic Leader
Arthur W. DeCabooter	2019	Educator and Land Preservationist
Michael J. Fox	2019	Art and Heritage Preservationist
Alfredo Gutierrez	2019	Arizona State Senator and Community Activist
Merrill Mahaffey	2019	Western Artist, Painter, and Teacher
Vernon D. Swaback	2019	Architect
Terry Goddard	2023	Politician, Historic Preservationist and Activist for Transparent Government
Dolan Ellis	2023	State Balladeer and History Preservationist
Frank Barrios	2023	Master Storyteller, Social Activist, Water Conservationist
Michael M. Crow	2023	Educational Leader and Innovator
Angel Delgadillo	2023	Father of Historic U.S. Route 66 and Businessman
Denise D. Resnik	2023	Advocate for Autism Treatment and Businesswoman
Daniel D. Von Hoff	2023	Founding Physician-in-Chief of TGen, Cancer Researcher
Jefferey M. Trent	2023	Genomics Pioneer, Founder of TGen
Elizabeth J. White	2023	Restaurateur, Community Leader
Adele O’Sullivan	2025	Established Innovative Continuum of Care for Arizonans Experiencing Homelessness
Bob Boze Bell	2025	Writer, Humorist, Artist, Old West Historian
Diana Yazzie Devine	2025	Housing Innovator and Native American Healthcare Advocate
F. Ronald Rayner	2025	Agriculture Innovator and Utilities Officer
John W. Graham	2025	Real Estate Developer, Community Leader
Sharon Harper	2025	Business/Civic Leaders
Oliver Harper	2025	Business/Civic Leaders
Eric M. Reiman	2025	Alzheimer’s Researcher and Doctor
Duane M. Wooten	2025	Pediatrician, Community Leader
