= Jodi Black =

American microbiologist and research administrator

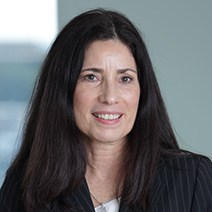
- Black in 2016
- Education: Rollins College (BA); Emory University (MMSc, PhD)
- Scientific career
- Fields: Microbiology, research administration
- Workplaces: Centers for Disease Control and Prevention; Translational Genomics Research Institute; National Institutes of Health
- Thesis: Human herpesvirus 6 strain Z29: Growth characteristics, virion specific protein identification and the effect of infection on the host (1990)
- Doctoral advisor: Philip E. Pellett

Jodi Beth Black is an American microbiologist and research administrator who worked at the Food and Drug Administration in 2021. She previously served as deputy director of the Office of Extramural Research at the National Institutes of Health, director and vice president of research administration at the Translational Genomics Research Institute and acting director of the division of extramural activities at the National Heart, Lung, and Blood Institute.

== Education ==
Jodi Black earned a Bachelor of Arts in biology at Rollins College. She completed a Ph.D. in experimental pathology and Masters of Medical Science in infectious diseases at Emory University. Her dissertation was titled Human herpesvirus 6 strain Z29: Growth characteristics, virion specific protein identification and the effect of infection on the host. Her doctoral advisor was Philip E. Pellett.

== Career and research ==
Black was a research microbiologist at the Centers for Disease Control and Prevention (CDC), where she served as the head for the CDC Cellular Virology Lab in the Herpes Virus section. She joined the National Institutes of Health (NIH) as a program officer and director of the Office of the AIDS Malignancy Program at the National Cancer Institute.

From 2005 through 2009 she served as director and vice president of research administration at the Translational Genomics Research Institute.

Black later worked as the acting director of the National Heart, Lung, and Blood Institute (NHLBI) Division of Extramural Research Activities. At NHLBI, she led and managed the institute's extramural research and training programs. She established several trans-NIH programs to support the development and transition of NIH-supported research technologies to the private sector, and to increase and expedite the translation of basic science discoveries into new diagnostics, devices, treatments, and patient services.

From 2016 to 2021, Black served as the deputy director of the NIH Office of Extramural Research (OER). She led and supported development of initiatives, programs and grants management policy and processes, and the small business and extramural technology development programs.

In her career, Black has developed, implemented, and managed large, diverse, multidisciplinary scientific programs in areas including infectious diseases, cancer and genomics and has developed strategic alliances between academic, healthcare and commercial organizations to leverage resources and capacity across institutions to enhance the translation of innovative technologies from the bench to the market to enhance health.

== Selected works ==
- Black, Jodi B.; Inoue, Naoki; Kite-Powell, Kathleen; Zaki, Sherif; Pellett, Philip E. (1993). "Frequent isolation of human herpesvirus 7 from saliva". Virus Research. 29 (1): 91–98. doi:10.1016/0168-1702(93)90128-A. ISSN 0168-1702. PMID 8212853.
- Black, Jodi B.; Pellett, Philip E. (1999). "Human herpesvirus 7". Reviews in Medical Virology. 9 (4): 245–262. doi:10.1002/(SICI)1099-1654(199910/12)9:4<245::AID-RMV253>3.0.CO;2-I. ISSN 1099-1654. PMID 10578120. S2CID 5716697.
- Watanabe, Takahiro; Kawamura, Tatsuyoshi; Aquilino, Elisabeth A.; Blauvelt, Andrew; Jacob, Sharon E.; Orenstein, Jan M.; Black, Jodi B. (2002). "Pityriasis Rosea is Associated with Systemic Active Infection with Both Human Herpesvirus-7 and Human Herpesvirus-6". Journal of Investigative Dermatology. 119 (4): 793–797. doi:10.1046/j.1523-1747.2002.00200.x. ISSN 0022-202X. PMID 12406322.
