= Del and Jewell McFarland Lewis =

Arizona media moguls in the late twentieth century

Del Lewis and Jewell McFarland Lewis
- Born: Delbert Ray Lewis; June 9, 1926; California, U.S.; Jewell McFarland; August , 1929; Fairfield, Iowa, U.S.
- Died: Jewell; Phoenix, Arizona; 9 April 2003 (aged 73); Del; Phoenix, Arizona; 24 May 2023 (aged 96)
- Occupation: Co-Owners of Arizona Television Company

Delbert “Del” Lewis and Jewel McFarland Lewis were a husband and wife duo who acted as President/CEO, and Chairman of the Board of the Arizona Television Company, respectively. The two also helped cofound the organization along with Jewel’s father Ernest McFarland.

== Early life ==
Delbert Ray Lewis was born on June 9, 1926, in California. His family relocated to Arizona when he was two years old, first homesteading north of Phoenix before later settling in Phoenix and Florence during the Great Depression. He graduated from Phoenix Union High School at age seventeen before enlisting in the United States Navy during World War II.

Lewis served as a member of the Navy Seabees in the Pacific Theater, where he was stationed on Tinian in the Mariana Islands. During his service he participated in construction projects supporting Allied operations and later took part in reconstruction work in Japan following the war. Lewis later recalled witnessing the departure of the Enola Gay from Tinian prior to the atomic bombing of Hiroshima.

After returning from military service, Lewis enrolled at the University of Arizona, where he studied engineering.

Jewell McFarland was the adopted daughter of Ernest McFarland, who married her mother, Edna Eveland Smith, in 1939. Raised in Florence, Arizona, she attended the University of Arizona before earning a master's degree while living in Washington, D.C., fulfilling a condition her father set before approving her marriage to Lewis.

== Personal life ==
Lewis met Jewell McFarland in Florence following his return from military service. The couple married on June 17, 1951, in Washington, D.C., while Ernest McFarland was serving as Senate Majority Leader. Their wedding was attended by numerous political leaders and members of the judiciary, reflecting the McFarland family's prominence in national politics.The couple eventually raised five children together.

Jewell became widely recognized for her community leadership and philanthropic work, particularly in education, women's services, healthcare, and historic preservation. She served on numerous nonprofit boards and was honored through the establishment of the Jewell McFarland Lewis Women's Resource Center, a facility dedicated to providing educational resources, employment assistance, and support services for women.

Following Jewell's death in 2003, Del Lewis later married Sharron Lewis, with whom he continued supporting charitable organizations throughout Arizona.

== Career ==
Following their marriage, Del and Jewell Lewis returned to Arizona to manage the McFarland family's cotton farming operation near Florence. Lewis successfully expanded his interests beyond agriculture, combining engineering, business, and political experience developed while assisting Ernest McFarland's political campaigns.

After McFarland's defeat in the 1952 United States Senate election, the family shifted its attention toward broadcasting. Working with McFarland, Lewis helped secure one of Phoenix's earliest commercial television licenses, leading to the establishment of KTVK in 1955. Lewis used his engineering background to help design the station's facilities before becoming its president and general manager.

Under the Lewis family's ownership, KTVK grew into one of Arizona's most successful television stations. Even after losing its long-standing ABC network affiliation in 1995, the independently operated station remained among the state's highest-rated broadcasters. The Lewis family emphasized local programming and community engagement, branding the station as "Arizona's Family," a slogan that became synonymous with the station itself. Their children later assumed ownership and leadership roles within the family's broadcasting enterprise.

Beyond broadcasting, Lewis remained active in civic leadership. He served on the board of Good Samaritan Hospital, supported numerous educational and healthcare organizations, and participated in historic preservation initiatives, including fundraising efforts that contributed to the restoration of Phoenix's historic Orpheum Theatre.

Jewell Lewis likewise maintained an extensive record of public service. She devoted significant attention to women's education, literacy initiatives, and community organizations throughout Arizona. Her leadership extended to museums, cultural organizations, healthcare institutions, and programs serving disadvantaged families. She was widely regarded as one of Arizona's leading civic philanthropists.

== Death and legacy ==
Jewell McFarland Lewis died on April 8, 2003, after decades of civic and philanthropic leadership.

Delbert R. Lewis died on May 24, 2023. His death was widely reported throughout Arizona, with tributes recognizing his contributions to broadcasting, engineering, agriculture, philanthropy, and civic leadership.

Lewis received numerous honors during his lifetime, including induction into the Arizona Broadcasters Hall of Fame in 1997 and the University of Arizona College of Engineering Hall of Fame in 2018. His legacy also continues through the family's long stewardship of KTVK and their extensive philanthropic support for Arizona educational, cultural, healthcare, and historic preservation organizations.

Together, Del and Jewell Lewis are remembered as one of Arizona's most influential philanthropic families. Their combined impact extended across broadcasting, higher education, healthcare, women's advocacy, historic preservation, and the arts, helping shape the civic landscape of Arizona during the latter half of the twentieth century. Their many ventures led to them being recognized by the Arizona Historical League as Arizona Historymakers.
