= Helen K. Mason =

African-American theater director (1912–2003)

Helen Katherine Oby Mason (December 28, 1912 – January 10, 2003) was an African-American theatre director and cultural advocate from Phoenix, Arizona. She was the founder of the Black Theatre Troupe, one of the oldest Black performing companies in the United States.

== Biography ==
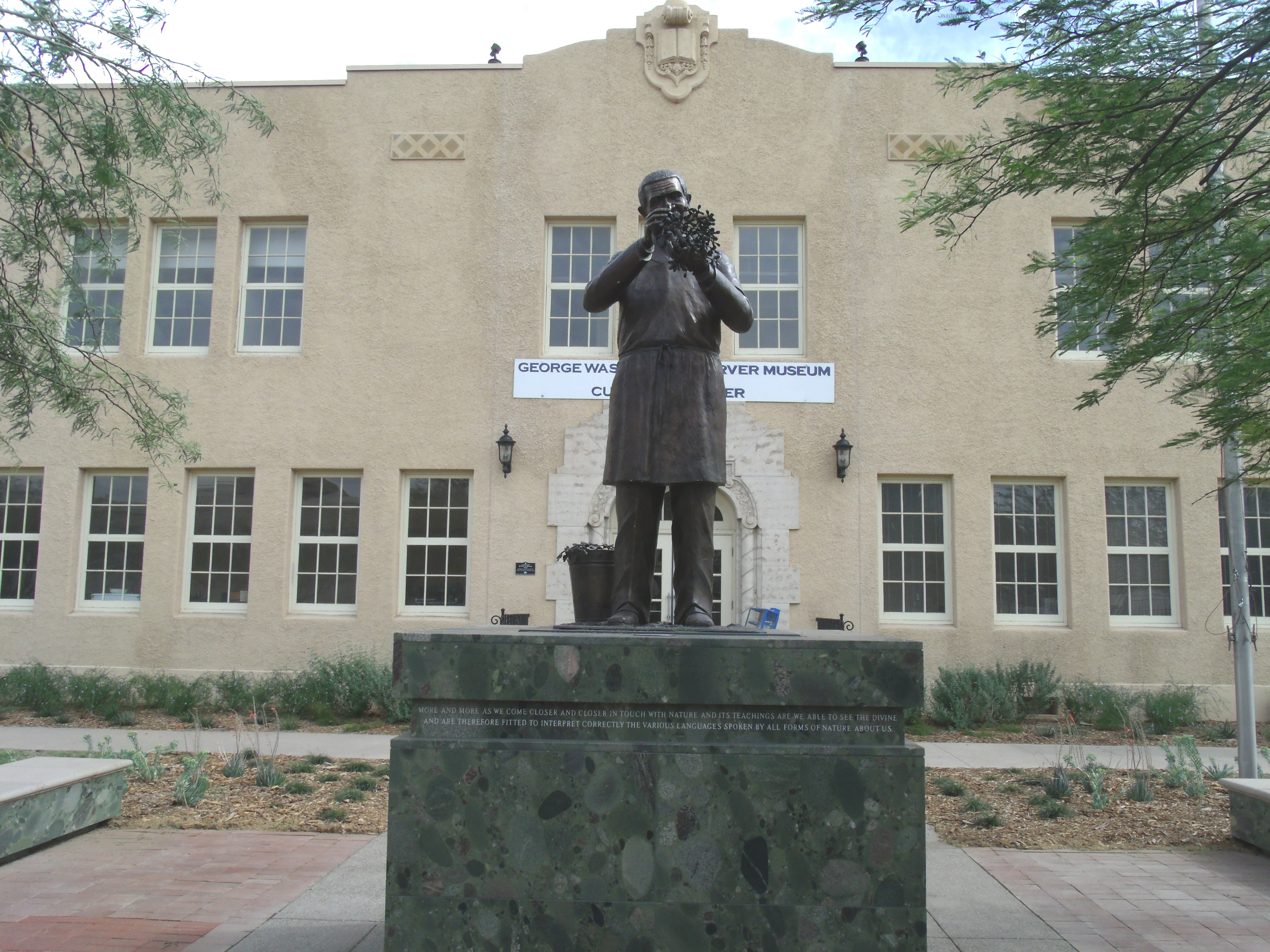
Phoenix Union Colored High School, where Mason would attend and graduate from.

Helen Oby was born on December 28, 1912, in Phoenix. She was reportedly a descendent of Mary Green, recognized as the first recorded Black resident of Arizona, who arrived from Arkansas in 1868.

At the time of Mason's birth, Phoenix, and the state of Arizona, was largely segregated between white and black residents. Arizona had become a state only several months earlier. Prior to statehood, Arizona school districts legally segregated African-Americans from students of other racial backgrounds. Arizona schools would remain segregated until 1953, and a majority of businesses in the state would remain segregated until the passage of the Civil Rights Act of 1964.

Mason graduated from Phoenix Union Colored High School (later known as the Carver High School). It was the only legally segregated high school in the state. She later moved to Los Angeles, California, to attend the Frank Wiggins Trade School where she learned cosmetology. During World War II, she returned to Arizona and married Carl Mason. The couple would share five children together.

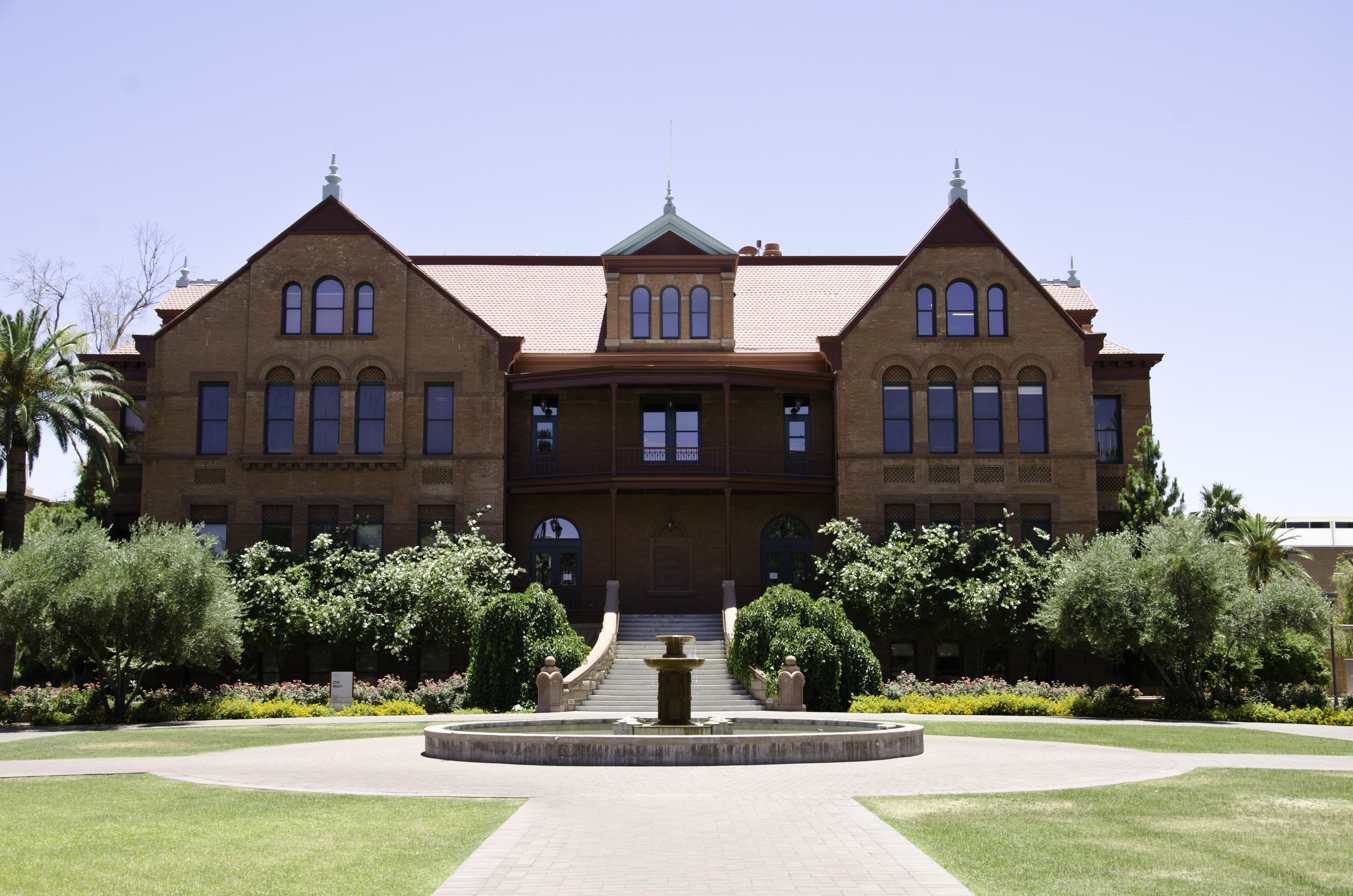
"Old Main" on Arizona State University's campus

=== Parks and Recreation Department ===
In 1958, Mason graduated from Arizona State University with a Bachelor of Arts degree in recreation. She went on to join the City of Phoenix's Parks and Recreation Department, where she would work for the next twenty-three years. She became the first African-American woman to become a supervisor at the department.

While working at the parks department, Mason found that black youths and adults did not have equal access to cultural programs as white people in the community. She worked to develop further programming for African-Americans in art, dance and theater.

=== Black Theatre Troupe ===
"There was nothing for young people to do but get into trouble...I wanted to give them something to occupy their time that would be positive and increase their self respect." Helen Mason on the founding of the Black Theatre Troupe.

Inspired by the Black Arts Movement, in 1969–1970, Mason founded the Black Theatre Troupe, and became the group's executive director. The troupe was one of the earliest black theater companies in the United States, and unique for its setting in the American west. It became an integral part to showcasing diversity in the state of Arizona and for providing opportunities to black actors and performers. Since its founding, the Black Theatre Troupe has featured a number of performers who would go on to wider success, including Lynda Gravátt and Rod Ambrose.

=== Death and legacy ===
"We live in scary times where you don’t know what tomorrow will bring...But I honestly think the Black Theatre Troupe will be around 25 years from now. We pull together and do what we need to do." Helen Mason on her aspirations for the Theatre Troupe

Mason died in Chula Vista, California, on January 10, 2003. At the time, many feared the theatre troupe would die with her. Despite difficulties, the theatre company has persisted and thrived. In 2006, the Black Theatre Troupe received a $2.5 million bond to build a performance space and incubation program for arts programs. The Helen K. Mason Performing Arts Center opened in downtown Phoenix on February 1, 2013, and remains the troupe's home. In 2025, the Black Theatre Troupe marked its 55th season of performances.

In 2015, Helen Mason was inducted into the Arizona Women's Hall of Fame for her contributions to culture and diversity in the state.

== See also ==
- African-American history of Arizona
- The Arena Players, the oldest recognized Black theater company in the United States
