= Phoenix City Hall =

City hall for the City of Phoenix, Arizona

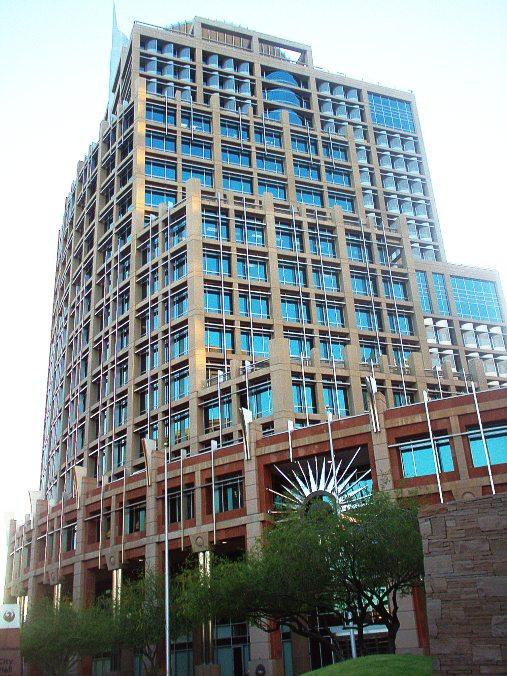
- Phoenix City Hall
- Interactive map of the Phoenix City Hall area

General information
- Type: Government
- Location: 200 West Washington Street, Phoenix, Arizona
- Coordinates: 33.4489°N 112.0771°W
- Construction started: 1992; 34 years ago
- Completed: 1994; 32 years ago
- Owner: City of Phoenix

Height
- Roof: 368 ft (112 m)

Technical details
- Floor count: 20
- Floor area: 599,959 sq ft (55,738.0 m^{2})

Design and construction
- Architect: Langdon Wilson
- Main contractor: Huber, Hunt & Nichols, Inc.

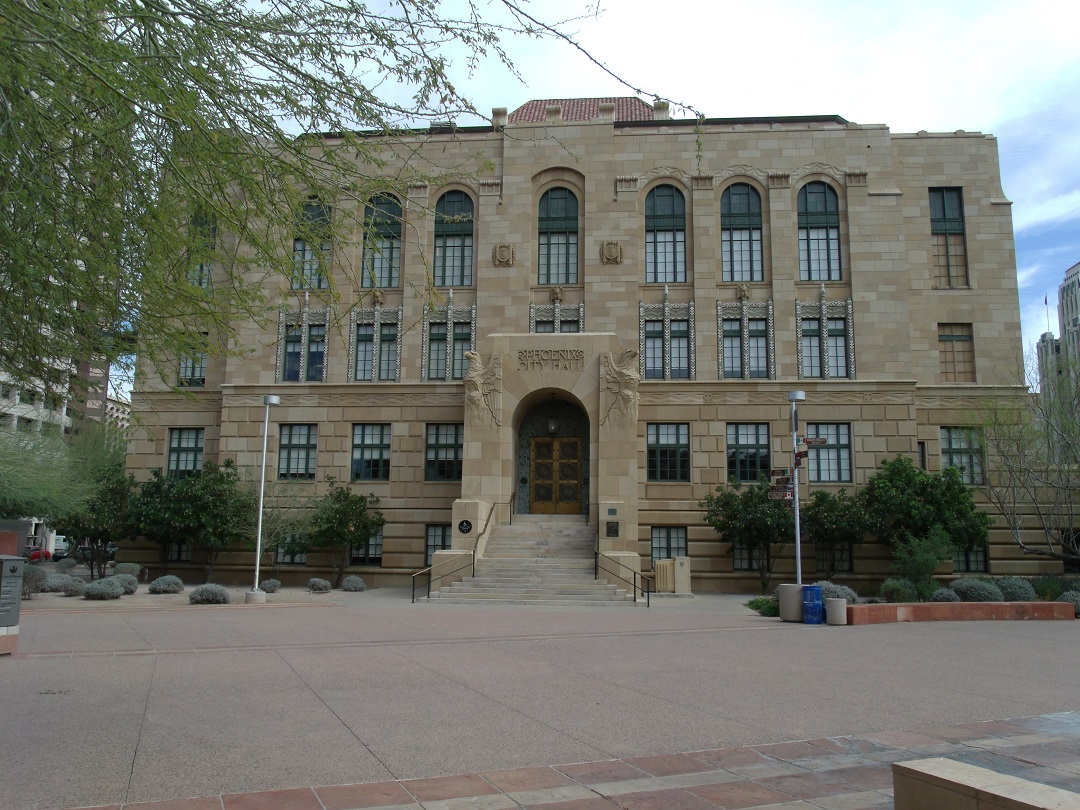
Old City Hall

Phoenix City Hall is the center of government for the city of Phoenix, Arizona, United States.

== Background ==
Located in Downtown Phoenix, the 20-floor, 368-foot (112-meter) building was designed by architectural firm Langdon Wilson. Construction began in 1992 and was completed in 1994. It replaced the former city hall, now known as Old City Hall. The total cost to build City Hall and its adjacent parking garage, and to renovate Old City Hall, was US$83 million.

Additional city services are administered from the Calvin C. Goode Municipal Building.

Phoenix's original city hall, at 1st Street and Washington (on Block 23) was demolished after the construction of Old City Hall.

== See also ==
- List of tallest buildings in Phoenix
