= Philip Campbell Curtis =

American painter (1907–2000)

- Born: May 26, 1907; Jackson, Michigan, US
- Died: November 12, 2000 (aged 93)
- Style: Surrealism

Philip Campbell Curtis (May 26, 1907 – November 12, 2000) was an American painter best remembered for his surrealist-inspired style scenes often featuring figures in Victorian dress. He was called a "Magical Realist," and "Magritte of the Old West" by some writers.

== Biography ==
Curtis was born on May 26, 1907, in Jackson, Michigan to Elise and George Curtis. He had three younger brothers: Harry, Malcolm (Mike) and Robert. A bone chilling fall through the ice on Vandercook Lake near Jackson during a hunting excursion when he was sixteen led to a serious illness and a year of bed rest. The after-effects of the illness were severe and painful arthritis for which Curtis sought relief throughout his life. Curtis looked on his arthritic condition philosophically, musing that the restrictions to his activities led to his contemplative life as a painter: "I'm most comfortable sitting at the easel, so I credit my arthritis with making me happy with my situation." He received a B.A. from Albion College where he was introduced to art through the newly formed art department in the person of the sole faculty member, Charlotte Swanson (later Cleeland). Following in the footsteps of his father and grandfather, both judges, Curtis undertook the study of law at the University of Michigan beginning in spring 1930. He was conflicted and eventually art won out. In fall 1932, he enrolled in Yale University's School of Fine Art. At Yale he followed a classical course of study with emphasis on painting and drawing from life with professors Francis Taylor, Eugene Savage and Lewis York. He also studied mural painting, a skill that would stand him in good stead over the next decade. he painted portraits and worked on murals to support himself while he was at Yale. Although he left Yale after three years, he had been so often promoted to advanced classes that he was awarded a four-year certificate. By October 1935, Curtis was living in an apartment on Orchard Street on the lower east side in New York City. He applied several times to the Works Progress Administration's Federal Arts Program. Curtis was among the applicants who did not need relief, so he was appointed as an assistant supervisor for the Manhattan mural works project. Among the artists he worked with were Stuart Davis, Arshile Gorky and Yasuo Kuniyoshi. In March 1937, the WPA sent Curtis to Phoenix to start an arts center, which is today the Phoenix Art Museum. Following his success in Phoenix, the WPA sent Curtis to Iowa to start the Des Moines Art Center. The WPA came to an end in 1941 and Curtis enrolled in a museum administration program at the Fogg Museum at Harvard University. His studies were interrupted by the Second World War, and Curtis served his country as a member of the Office of Strategic Services in Washington, D.C. At the end of the war, Curtis returned to Phoenix and in 1948 met George Ellis, a civil engineer and contractor, and his wife Racheal Murdock Ellis, an elementary school teacher and costumer. The Ellises moved a converted barn from a nearby ranch onto their property (now called Cattle Track) in Scottsdale, Arizona as a house and studio for Phil and Marge. (Marjorie Yaeger 1917-2000, they met and married in Phoenix in 1937). For the rest of his life, Curtis lived in the little house next door to the Ellis family, which eventually grew to include their three children, David, Janie and Michael.

The Ellises' interests and exploits became intertwined with his own, sometimes inspiring characters, situations or details in his paintings. Racheal's costumes often appear in Curtis paintings for example. Janie Ellis prepared many of the bonded plywood and masonite boards that Curtis painted on, making the base layer of gesso from a fine powder mixed with rabbit skin glue and cooked to the right consistency over a period of hours. The gesso was applied in alternating directions in forty thin layers and sanded to a smooth finish. Curtis sketched his compositions with a thin wash of pigment and worked up the surface gradually, in the manner of traditional painters. Most of his paintings are glazed to preserve the surface and to enhance the color of the pigments and quality of light. After 1960 his frames were made by Sandra Kempner, who sought out unusual materials to enhance the qualities of the paintings. In some cases she or Rachael and Janie Ellis found parts of furniture that became frames for Curtis' paintings.

Curtis is frequently classified as an American Surrealist or Magic Realist. He seemed ambivalent toward that designation, at times identifying with the Surrealists and at other times setting himself apart, saying they were too gloomy. Heather Lineberry notes that Curtis did not work in a Surrealist style until he came to Arizona in 1937: "Life in Arizona offered Curtis the space he needed to find his own vision with Surrealism."

== Legacy ==
In 1992, Curtis was named an Arizona Historymaker in the Arizona Historical League’s inaugural group of Arizonans who have greatly impacted the state.
