= Maricopa County Courthouse =

- U.S. National Register of Historic Places
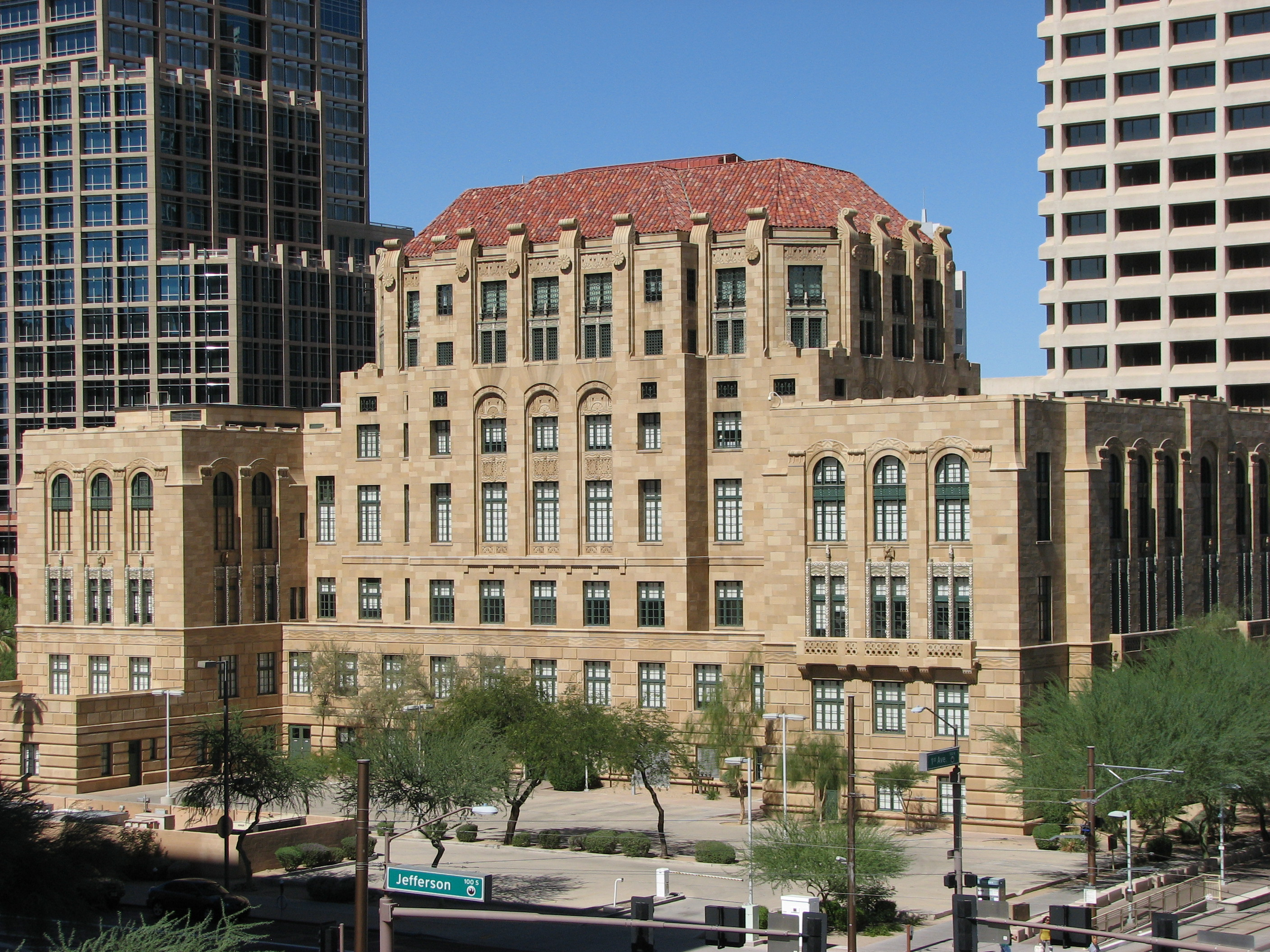
- The courthouse as seen from Jefferson Street

- Location within Arizona Location within the United States
- Interactive map showing the location of Maricopa County Courthouse and Old Phoenix City Hall
- Location: 125 W. Washington St., Phoenix, Arizona
- Coordinates: 33°26′51.8″N 112°4′32.8″W
- Area: 1.9 acres (0.77 ha)
- Built: April 1928—June 23, 1929
- Architect: Edward Neild; Lescher & Mahoney
- Architectural style: Mission Revival, Spanish Colonial Revival, Art Deco
- NRHP reference No.: 88003237
- Added to NRHP: February 10, 1989

The Maricopa County Courthouse and Old Phoenix City Hall, also known as the County-City Administration Building, is a historic structure in downtown Phoenix, Arizona. The structure consists of two buildings in a conjoined layout sharing the same architecture.

== History ==
=== The need for a new courthouse and city hall ===
The Maricopa County Courthouse and Phoenix City Hall was a joint effort of Maricopa County and the City of Phoenix, a "monumentally scaled" building taking up a full city block downtown. As city and county government matured, officials realized that a building of sufficient size was necessary to house county and city functions in an expanding Phoenix and Maricopa County. Maricopa County's facilities were an imposing two-story brick building in Block 76 of the townsite, completed in 1884; meanwhile, the original 1889 Phoenix city hall, which was designed by James M. Creighton and doubled as territorial capital until 1901, was also becoming too cramped for continued use.

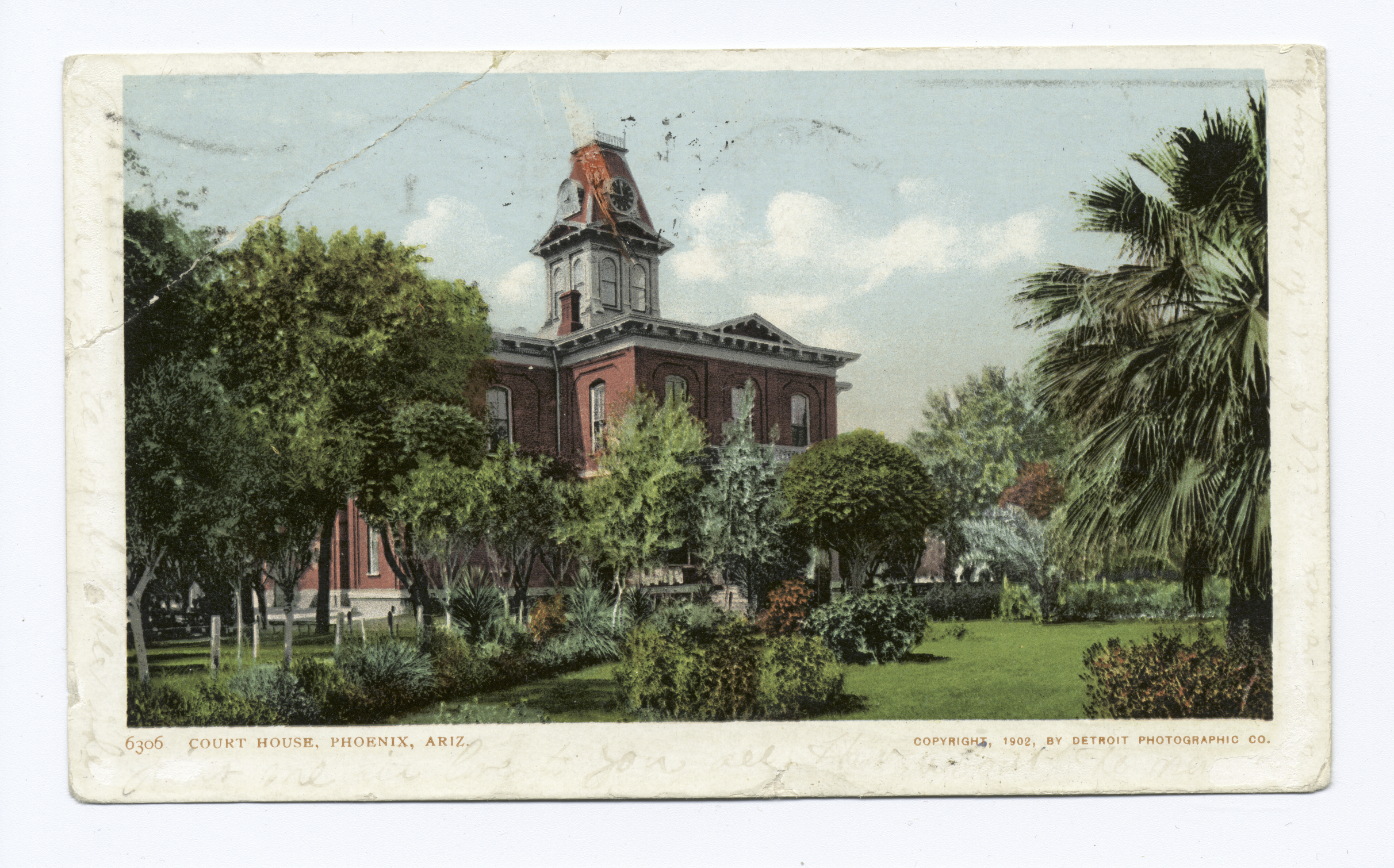
Old court house

On April 28, 1927, the county board of supervisors passed a resolution stating that the current courthouse and jail were no longer adequate for their needs. Additional space was needed for county departments, and adding to the 1884 structure would result in significant fire hazards. The board of supervisors called an election on May 21, 1927, to issue $750,000 in bonds to construct a new building on the Block 76 site; the citizens of Maricopa County approved the bonds by a margin of 3,489 to 780. On June 15, the board proceeded to begin the process of selecting an architect. When the bonds went to bid on July 18, nine investment firms and banks sought them, with Valley Bank and Trust of Phoenix being the winner.

Meanwhile, Phoenix, whose growth in the 1920s had led to at least eight new high-rise buildings downtown, saw an opportunity in the new county courthouse project to get a city hall. A group of reform-minded citizens led the charge to combine the two projects; in early 1927, Judge Frank O. Smith spoke twice to the city commission on behalf of a group in the Phoenix Chamber of Commerce. Days after his second speech, the board of supervisors sent the city a letter expressing a desire to collaborate on a shared building. With approval from both the board and the mayor and continued pressure from Judge Smith and the chamber of commerce, the ball began to roll. In June, the property was assessed, and after that, the board of supervisors accepted a bid from the city to acquire the western third of the property for Phoenix's city hall. On July 8, the city commission passed an ordinance calling for a special bond election to raise $450,000 to acquire the western third (valued at $150,000) and to build the new city hall. The election, held on August 16, saw Phoenicians vote 460 to 164 in favor of the proposal.

=== Design and construction ===
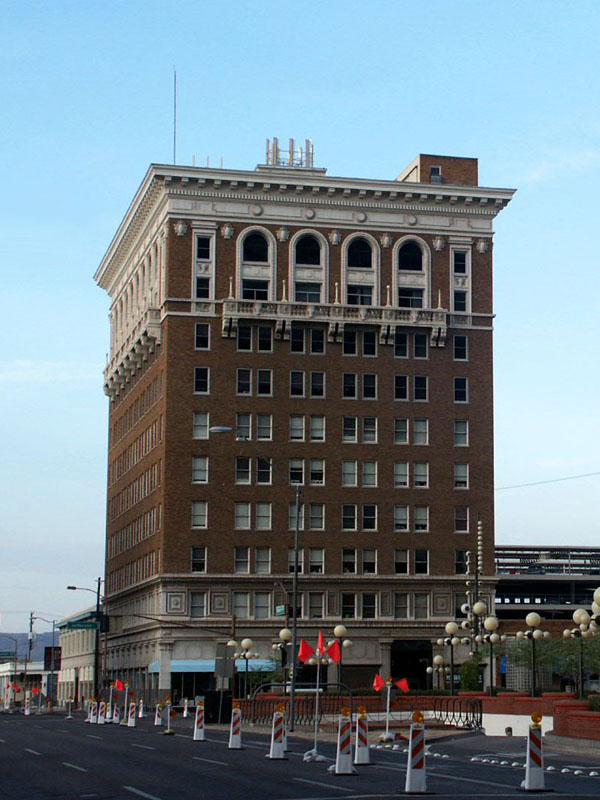
Trost and Trost, architect of the Luhrs Building (pictured), competed for the county courthouse contract

Early on, both sides began scouting architects. The board of supervisors traveled to various eastern and southern states in the summer of 1927 to evaluate the latest in new courthouses. They consulted other boards and commissions, and in September, they began to analyze the seven bids that had been received.

Prominent architects and firms figured among the contenders to build the county courthouse. Three of them were local: V. O. Wallingford of Phoenix, recognized for his architectural activities throughout the state; Fitzhugh & Byron, also of Phoenix; and Lescher & Mahoney, known for constructing schools and other public buildings. Four additional architects put in bids: William N. Bowman of Denver, designer of the Yavapai County Courthouse; Henry T. Phelps of San Antonio, who designed several courthouses in Texas; Trost & Trost of El Paso had designed many buildings in Tucson and the Luhrs Building downtown; and Shreveport architect Edward Neild, whose Caddo Parish Courthouse favorably impressed the supervisors. On September 19, 1927, the board of supervisors voted 2–1 to select Neild, with A. G. Austin voting instead for Bowman's proposal.

However, the decision did not meet well with the city of Phoenix, which had backed Lescher & Mahoney. Board and city officials worked to reach a compromise, and both sides expressed a desire to put their differences behind them. An official contract was signed in October, and in November, Phoenix signed a contract with Lescher & Mahoney to design its portion of the project. The contract called for Neild to be in charge of general exterior appearance, but Lescher & Mahoney added several elements to the exterior of the City Hall area and was largely in control of the design of its interiors. In April 1928, the board called for bids for the general contractor; the winning firm was Los Angeles-based Edwards, Wildey and Dixon, who had just completed the Security Building, with which the board was particularly impressed.

The contract process hit a snag when a contract specifying the highest quality furniture for the sum of $47,000 was contested by Berryhill Office Equipment Company. Berryhill sued in Maricopa County Superior Court, alleging that the county, by not providing specifications or calling for a lowest and best bid, did not follow prescribed bidding practices. The Superior Court ruled in favor of the county, but Berryhill appealed to the Arizona Supreme Court, which sided with Berryhill on June 14, 1929. The county was forced to redo the bidding process.

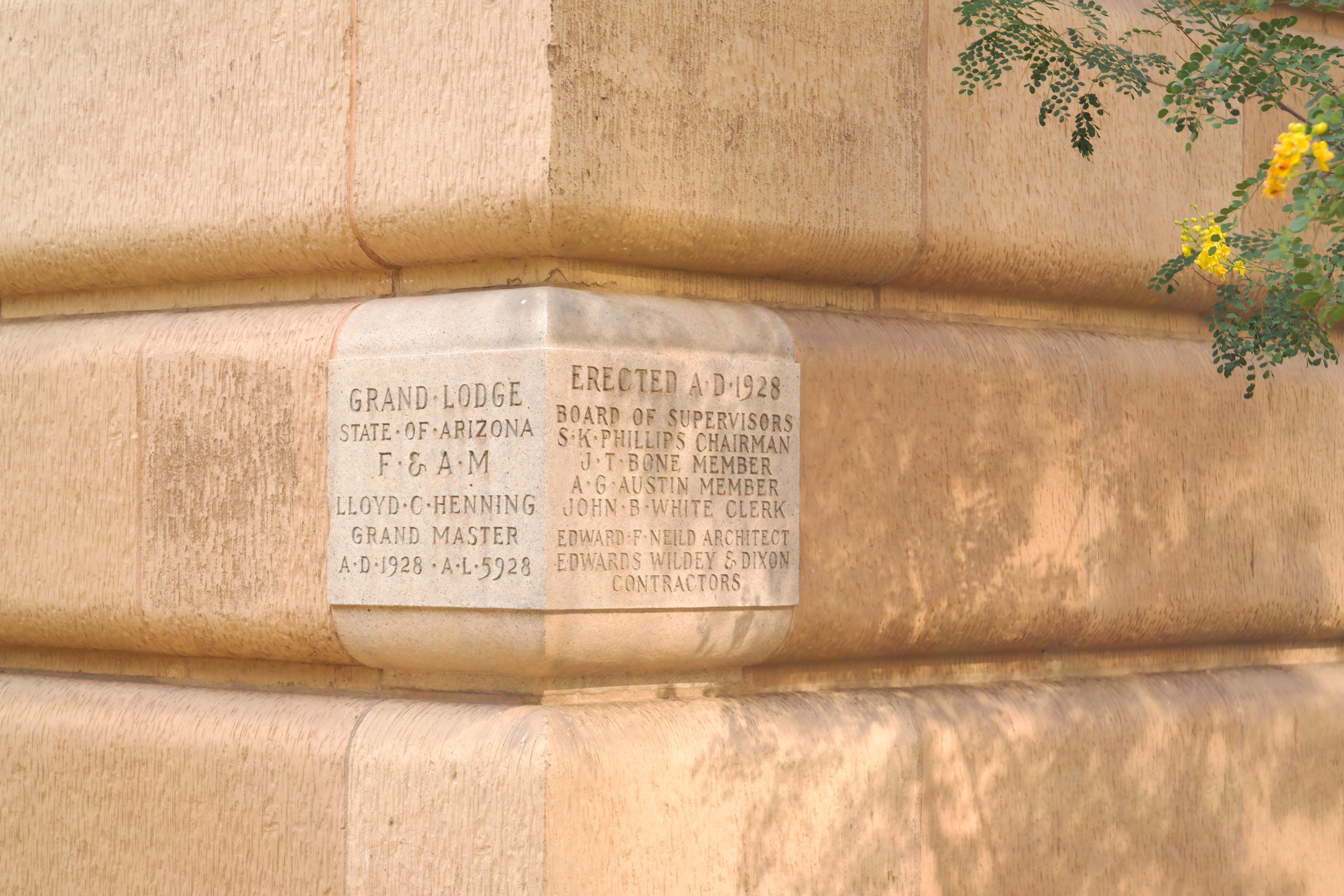
The cornerstone of the Maricopa County Courthouse

With the building half completed, the city and county hosted a dedication ceremony conducted by the Arizona Grand Lodge of Masons. Among the dignitaries present were Senator Carl Hayden, the acting Grand Orator, and Col. John Philip Sousa, conducting the Marine Corps Band. At the ceremony, the cornerstone of Arizona granite was laid, and a time capsule, coated in copper and containing documents, emblems and other ephemera, was mortared inside with a silver trowel.

The Berryhill lawsuit and normal construction delays pushed back occupancy from the scheduled date of April 1, 1929, to June 23, when the city and county formally took possession of the building, constructed at a total cost of $1,200,000.

=== Occupancy ===
The city and county each had portions of the building serving their own offices, with a jail on the fifth and sixth floors. The building housed the City Justice of the Peace and the Maricopa County Superior Court, making it an important hub of legal activity in the Phoenix area. Among the major county cases tried in the courthouse was the first trial of Ernesto Miranda, which eventually led to the landmark Miranda v. Arizona case of the Supreme Court of the United States in 1966 and, consequently, the ubiquitous "Miranda warning" issued by police. In addition, Winnie Ruth Judd was once jailed inside the courthouse.

=== Outgrowth and city relocation ===
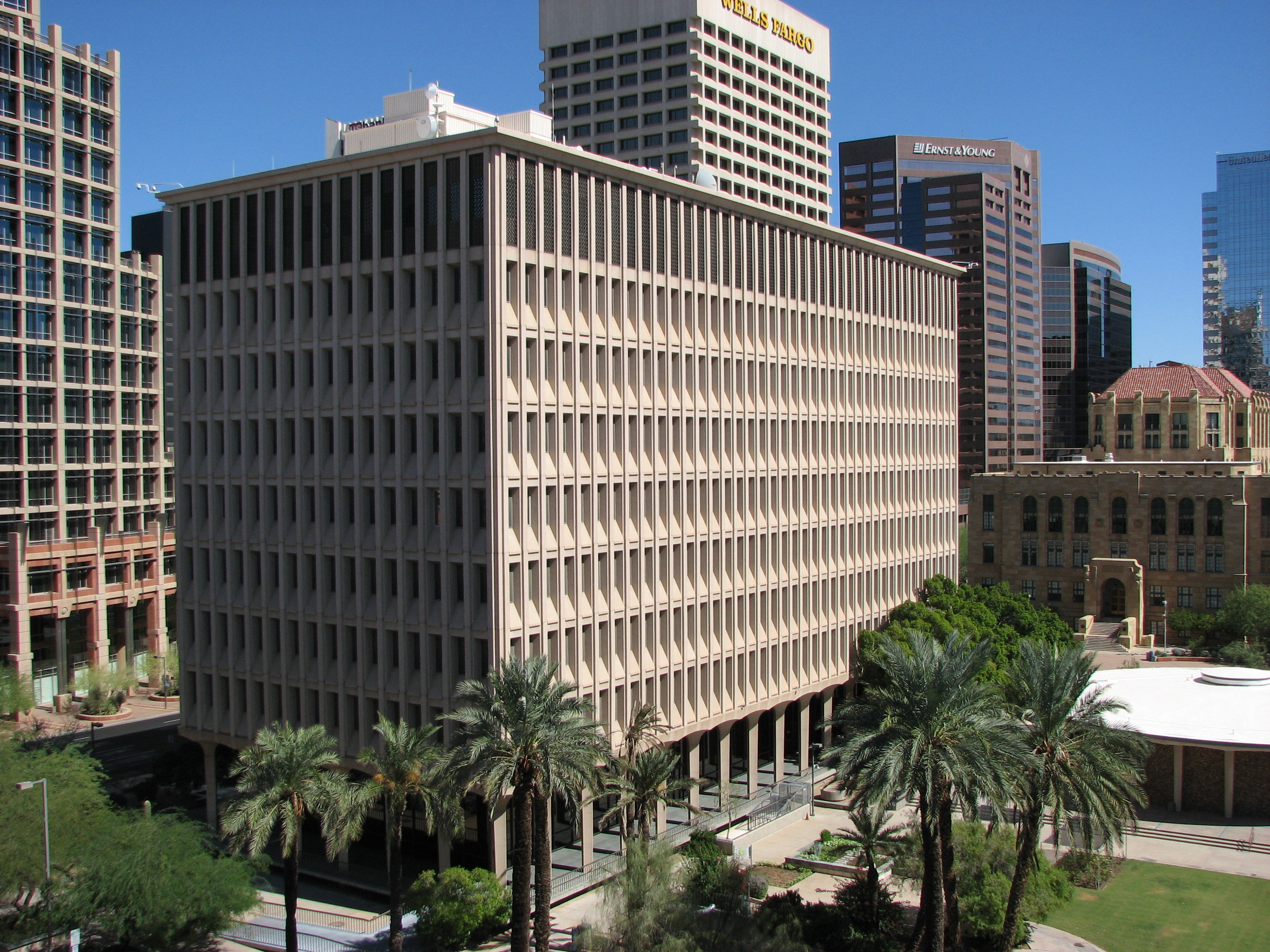
The Phoenix Municipal Building replaced the city hall in the County Courthouse (right)

With Phoenix and Maricopa County both continuing with explosive growth after World War II, the joint city-county building, which represented a vastly different era in state history, now was as inadequate as the structures it had replaced. As early as 1949, Phoenix officials began to explore the possibility of building a new city hall; the city needed so much space that it desired a building for its exclusive use. With this need growing ever more urgent, voters approved $4.3 million in bonds in April 1957 to build a new city hall. The modernist ten-story Phoenix Municipal Building (now the Calvin C. Goode Building) at 251 West Washington Street, designed by a consortium of Ralph Haver and Associates and Edward L. Varney and Associates, represented not only the increased size and stature of Phoenix but also the rapid evolution in architectural styles. At the same time, many Maricopa County functions moved to new facilities in the $11 million Maricopa County Governmental Complex, completed in 1964 and designed by the firm of Stephens Walsh Emmons Shanks.

The Superior Court still uses the building. In 2012, the Maricopa County Justice Museum opened in a sixth-floor cell block inside the Old Courthouse.

== Architecture ==
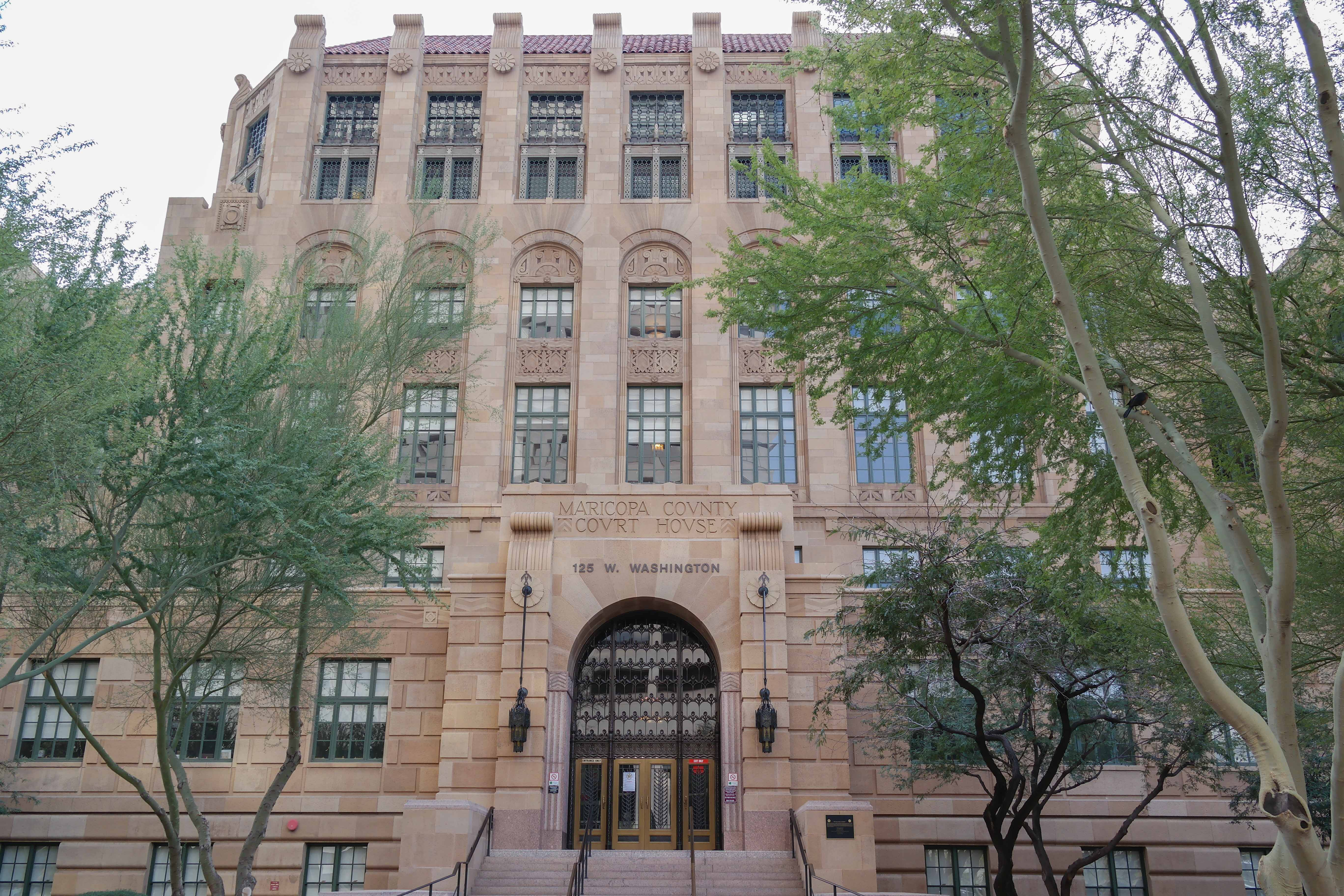
The front of the courthouse

=== Designers ===
The courthouse was designed by Shreveport architect Edward Neild in conjunction with the influential Phoenix firm of Lescher & Mahoney. At the time, Lescher & Mahoney dominated the design of public buildings in the state; their work included the county courthouses in Graham and Mohave counties, and while the courthouse was under construction the Orpheum Theater and Brophy College Chapel, also designs from Lescher & Mahoney, were under construction. Neild, meanwhile, had built the Shreveport Municipal Building in his hometown in 1924 and also designed several structures at Louisiana Tech University. The Maricopa County Courthouse is Neild's only known work in the state of Arizona.

=== Exterior ===
The Maricopa County Courthouse is designed in an H shape with overall dimensions of 230 feet (70 m) by 130 feet (40 m). The six-story central tower dominates the composition, with seven pronounced vertical bays. Two four-story projecting wings with three bays flank the east and west sides; as a whole, the building presents a "wide and imposing" façade to both Washington Street, which contains the entrance to the county portion, and to Jefferson Street.

The building is made of poured-in-place concrete using a conventional concrete frame. The structure itself sits on a raised foundation story made of evenly coursed terra cotta panels, with unornamented window openings. The exterior is clad in rusticated terra cotta panels of various colors that simulate yellow sandstone and also lend the building an appearance similar to that of masonry. The entry to the courthouse is set within a rounded arch, above which is inscribed "MARICOPA COUNTY COURT HOUSE". The entry is a pair of bronze doors with full glass panels topped with ornamental ironwork. The side wings on the second level have windows framed in cast iron, the one element that gives the courthouse a Southwestern flavor.

The most ornamentation is to be found on the building's upper two stories, used as the jail with a third masonry expression utilizing terra cotta panels. The windows on these levels have honeycomb patterns of tiles framed in cast iron, while the sixth floor has conventional steel frame windows. The bays rise to a segmented arch with radiating elements echoing those in the entryways, creating a Neoclassical, form-based appearance. The hipped, clay tile roof was originally coated in seven different colors of tiles, a detail no longer visible due to soiling.

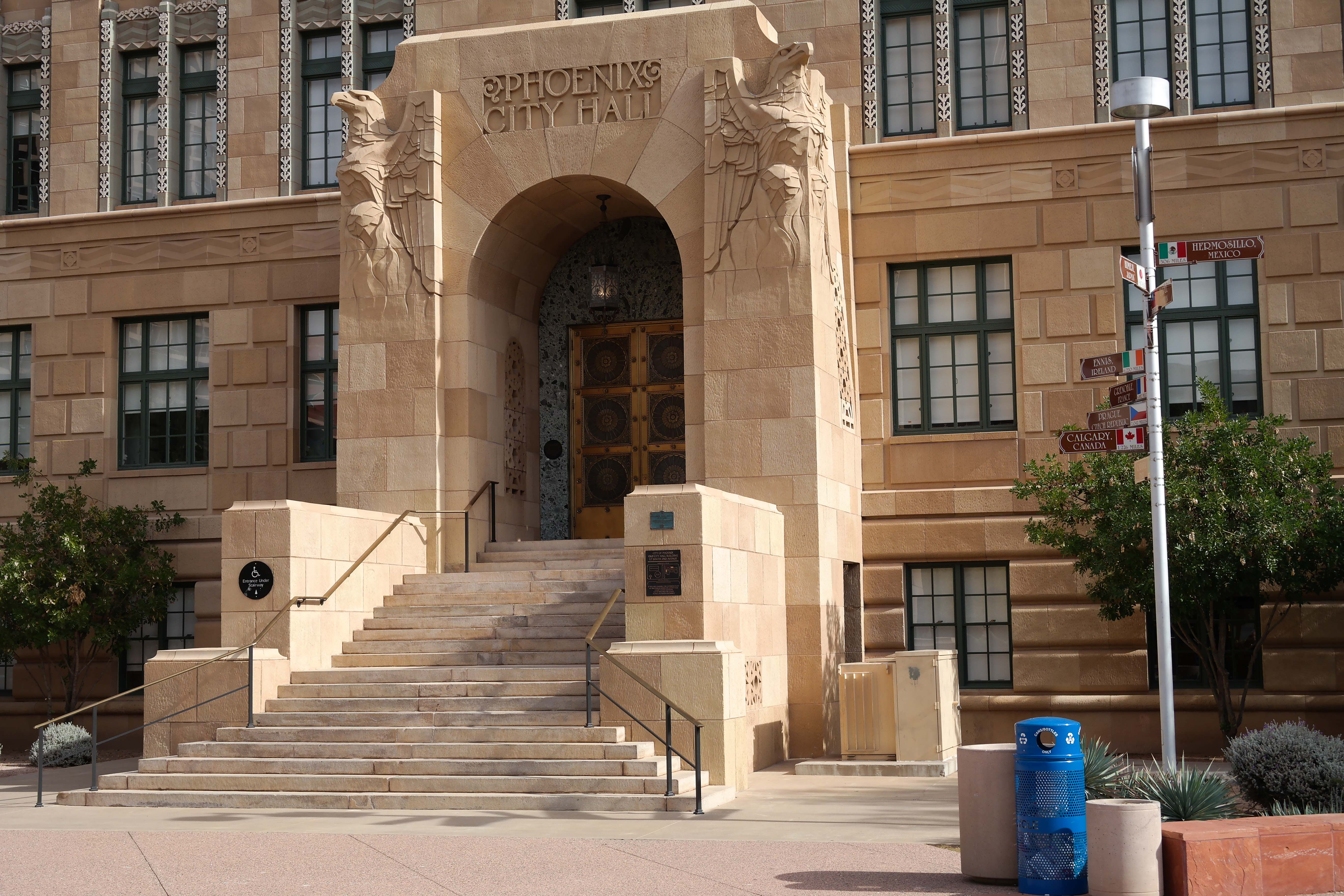
The entrance to Phoenix City Hall

The Second Avenue façade is the third primary elevation of the building, featuring the main entrance to the city portion. This entrance is also set inside an arch, which is flanked by terra cotta sculptures of the mythological phoenix. The wall adjacent to the entry is entirely made of polished granite, while the bronze doors are multi-paneled.

=== Interior ===
The interior is "equally as elaborate in detail" as the exterior, with numerous materials. Circulation centers around a longitudinal east-west corridor through the building. Behind the county entrance is a grand entrance foyer utilizing four types of marble; even the restrooms feature gray Alaskan marble wainscoting. Panelling and woodwork in the offices and courtrooms features Philippine mahogany. The interior breaks with the exterior stylistically, relying on Spanish Colonial Revival ornamentation on the first floor.

Several renovations were made prior to the building being listed, all minor reconfigurations of the interior. Some finishes and ceilings were obscured, fire-rated doors were added, and several rooms were divided, but the courtrooms were still predominantly intact in the late 1980s.
