= Calvin C. Goode =

Phoenix City Councilman

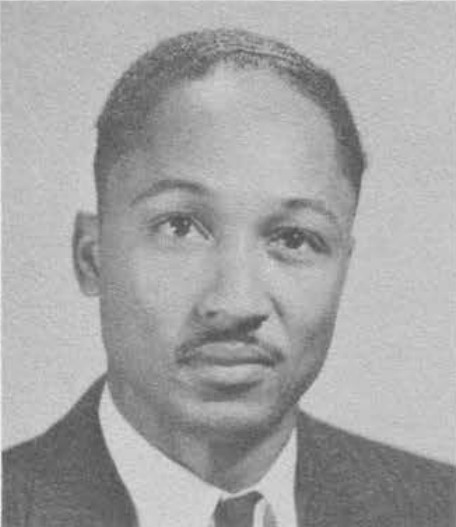
- Goode in 1962
- Born: Calvin Coolidge Goode; January 27, 1929; Depew, Oklahoma
- Died: December 23, 2020 (aged 93); Phoenix, Arizona
- Occupation: Phoenix City Councilman
- Spouse: Georgia "Georgie" Stroud
- Children: 3

Calvin C. Goode (January 27, 1929 – December 23, 2020) was a Phoenix accountant, city councilman, vice mayor, and civil rights leader. Goode was the longest-serving councilman in Phoenix history, serving 11 consecutive terms totaling 22 years of service. The Calvin C. Goode municipal building and the annual Phoenix Calvin C. Goode Lifetime Achievement Award were named in his honor.

Goode moved to Phoenix, Arizona as a teenager and worked as an accountant in the city for 30 years before pursuing public office. He served on the Phoenix City Council from 1972-1994, and was vice mayor from 1990 to 1994. He was referred to by colleagues and the media as the "Conscience of the Council."

== Early life and education ==
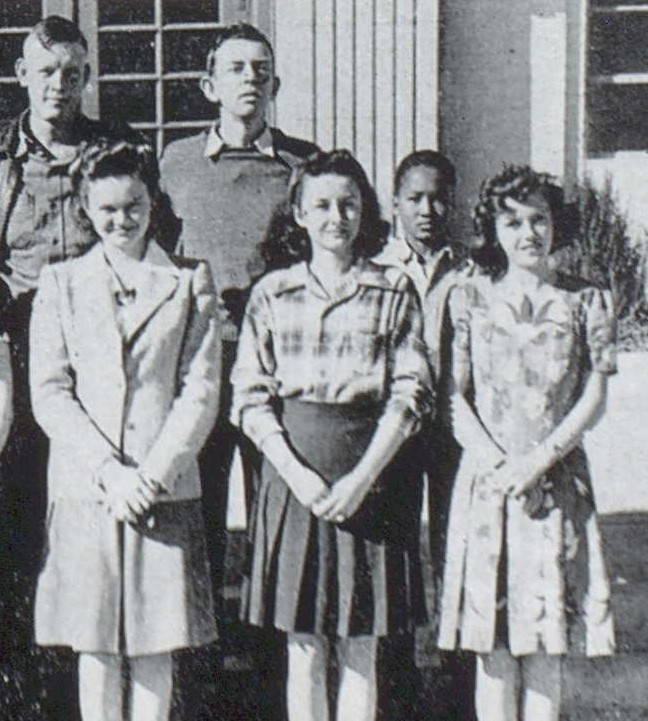
Calvin C. Goode and classmates at Prescott High School in 1943

Calvin Coolidge Goode was born in Depew, Oklahoma in 1927. As an infant, his family moved to Gila Bend, Arizona where his parents worked in agriculture, picking and chopping cotton. Goode's father had an eighth grade education and his mother had a sixth grade education. His parents were strong proponents of their children's education and encouraged academic achievement.

Because the high school in Gila Bend did not allow black students, Goode's family moved to Prescott, Arizona after his eighth grade year so he could attend high school.

During his junior year at Prescott High School Goode became ill, and his parents sent him to Phoenix for his health. In Phoenix Goode attended and graduated from Carver High School, a segregated high school for black students. He went on to earn a bachelors degree in business and a masters in education from Arizona State University.

== Accounting career ==
After completing his bachelors degree, Goode began his career in accounting. He worked as an accountant for the Phoenix Union High School District for 30 years. During his time at the school district, he also ran his own accounting business called Calvin Goode & Associates.

== Public service ==
They didn’t think I could win. But with the charter government committee’s help and my contacts made in the community, we put together a campaign.

— Calvin C. Goode

In 1971 Goode ran for Phoenix City Council. Some thought Goode an unlikely candidate due to his calm demeanor and softspokeness. Phoenix city manager Frank Fairbanks would later describe Goode as "someone who ran for council and was on council, not because of their ego, not because of anything he got out of it, but somebody who was dedicated to helping other people."

He won the 1971 election, and became a Phoenix City councilman in 1972. Goode was the second African American ever elected to the Phoenix City Council, following Dr. Morrison Warren who served from 1966 to 1970.

He was instrumental in the passing of a Phoenix city ordinance that prohibited workplace discrimination based on race, ethnicity, or sexual orientation.

Goode received the Lifetime Achievement Award at the Arizona Dr. Martin Luther King Jr. Celebration Awards in 1994, and the award was subsequently named after him.

After retiring from his position on the city council, Goode remained active in the Phoenix community. He volunteered his time with the Booker T. Washington Child Development Center, the Eastlake Neighborhood Association, and the George Washington Carver Museum and Cultural Center.

== Legacy ==
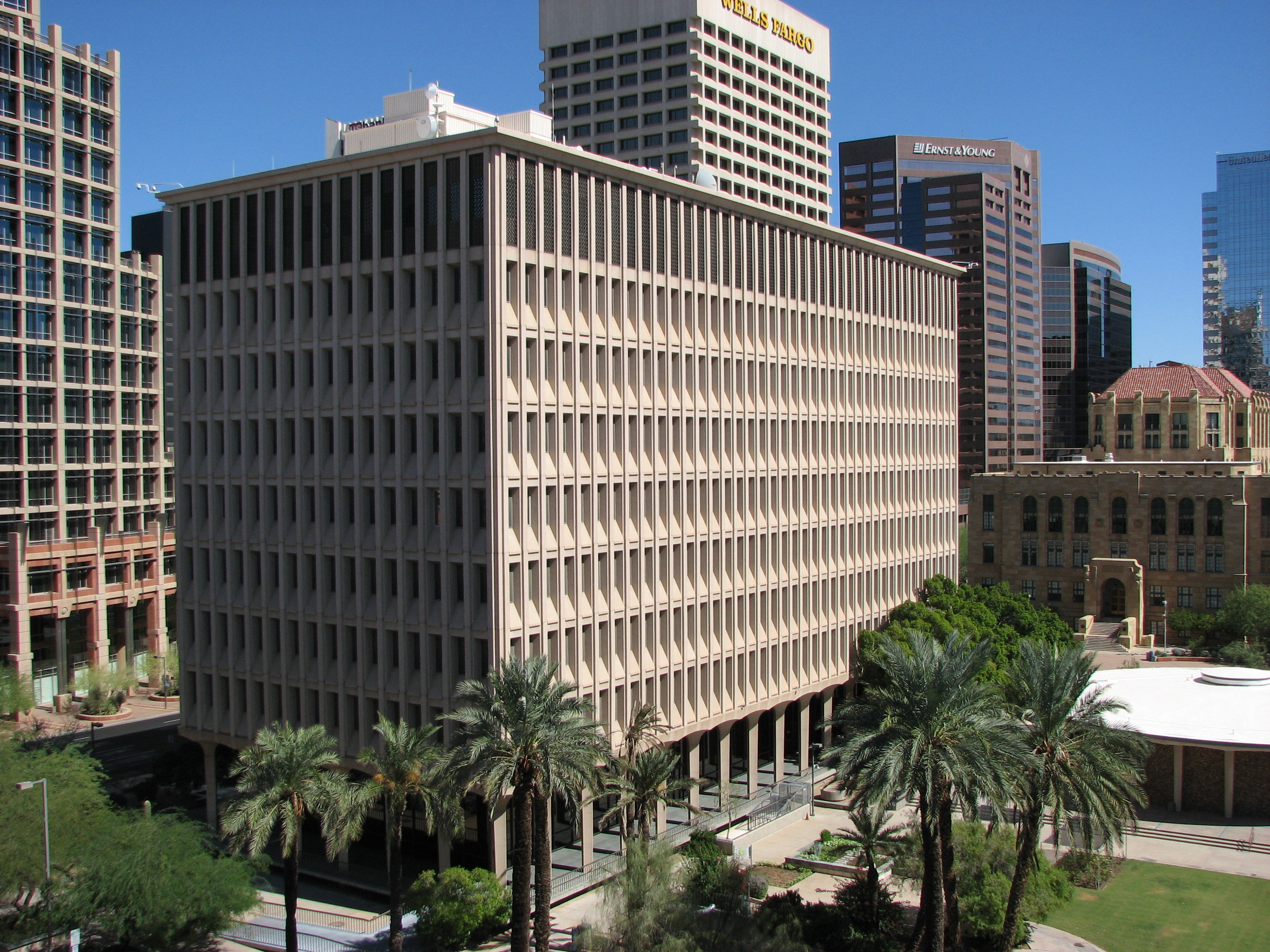
The Calvin C Goode Municipal Building was named in Goode's honor

The city of Phoenix presents the Calvin C. Goode Lifetime Achievement Award annually to an "exceptional individual who has made Phoenix a better place to live by promoting social and economic justice, defending civil rights and enhancing the dignity of all people."

The Phoenix Municipal Building was renamed the Calvin C. Goode municipal building to honor Goode. The building is only one of two in the city to be named in recognition of city officials.

Goode was recognized by the Arizona Historical League in 2003 as an Arizona Historymaker for his impact on the state.

== Personal life ==
Goode was married to school teacher Georgia "Georgie" Stroud from 1960 until her death in 2015. The couple had three sons: Vernon, Jerald, and Randolph.

Goode and his wife were active members of the Tanner Chapel Church, a historic black church in Phoenix. Georgie Goode served on the board of education of the Phoenix Elementary School District and the Phoenix Union High School District.
