= J. Eugene Grigsby =

American painter

- Born: Jefferson Eugene Grigsby, Jr. October 15, 1918; Greensboro, North Carolina
- Died: June 9, 2013 (aged 94)
- Occupations: Artist, Educator
- Spouse: Rosalyn Thomasena Marshall

J. Eugene Grigsby (October 15, 1918 – June 9, 2013) was a multimedia artist and educator. His primary mediums were printmaking and painting; his style of painting was abstract and expressionistic. Grigsby was an influential educator for both college and high school students. He was also heavily involved with community programs focused on uplifting lower socio-economic communities.

== Early life and education ==
Grigsby was born in Greensboro, North Carolina, in 1918. His parents were both teachers and relocated to Charlotte, North Carolina, after moving around throughout much of his childhood. At age 12, he knocked on a neighbor's door to sell newspapers and saw works of art lining the walls of the house. After inquiring about the artwork, the neighbor, a stonemason and painter, began to teach Grigsby to draw. As Grigsby fell in love with painting, his mother was accepting of it immediately, but his father did not believe he could make a living as a painter and was skeptical. He attended Johnson C. Smith University for one year and transferred to Morehouse College in Atlanta, Georgia to finish his Bachelor of Fine Arts. There, he studied under Hale Woodruff, a famed social activist and artist. He completed his master's from Ohio State University two years later. In 1963 he received a doctorate from New York University in Arts Education. Additionally, he studied at the American Artists School in New York and Ecole des Beaux-Arts in Marseilles, France.

== Career ==
Grigsby volunteered for World War II in 1942 and served in the Army. Upon returning after the war, he eventually settled in Phoenix, Arizona, where he spent much of his professional career. Starting in 1946 Grigsby served as the Founder and Chair of the Art Department at Carver High School for eight years, followed by serving as the Chair of Phoenix Union High School, once Carver High School closed due to desegregation.

Grigsby, who joined Alpha Phi Alpha fraternity while a student at Morehouse, was one of the seven founders of the alumni chapter of the fraternity in Phoenix, in 1949.

In 1966, Grigsby became a professor in the School of Art at Arizona State University. During his tenure, he became the first black author and artist to publish a book for art educators with his book Art and Ethnics: Background for Teaching Youth in a Pluralistic Society. According to Dr. Laura Chapman, an art education consultant, his book "remains today, a landmark in literature of art education." She goes on to say "it was also the first to address issues and stakes for all students in respecting the heritage and diversity in American society." Art and Ethnics was reprinted by the National Art Education Association in 2000. As an educator, Grigsby was known for encouraging students to use their cultural heritage to understand their own identities and to inform their art practice.

Aside from teaching, Grigsby was an active community leader. He attributes his involvement to his experiences working for three months teaching art at the American Pavilion at the World's Fair in Brussels in 1958. Following his time there, he began to start art programs in unlikely places, such as daycare centers and housing projects. He also worked to provide opportunities for young minority artists to exhibit their work. One of the ways he did this was through the founding of COBA (Consortium of Black Artists and Others for the Arts) which puts on an invitational exhibition of work from inner-city high school students in Phoenix annually and brings in a prominent African American artist to the Phoenix region every two years ,among other community supported programs. Additionally ,he started the "Arts in Job Development" program through the Opportunities Industrialization Center which provides employment training programs for under-erved populations in the United States. On a national stage, Grigsby was involved with the National Art Education Association. He attended the second convening and was Chair of the Committee on Minority Concerns ,which is now the Committee on Multiethnic Concerns.

Grigsby was a prolific artist who continued to create art even at the age of 93. According to Grigsby "a visual artist expresses himself/herself about human conditions, within a framework of design". Grigsby's aesthetics are heavily influenced by African art, specifically from the Kuba Kingdom. Family is cited as one of his many inspirations, though other themes of social injustice and humanity are often present in his work as well.

== Legacy ==
Grigsby was named and recognized by the Arizona Historical League as an Arizona Historymaker. He was part of the inaugural group of honorees for his role in Phoenix education and community advocacy.

== Selected exhibitions ==
- 1940: Tanner Art Galleries, Chicago Illinois, "Exhibition of the Art of the American Negro"
- 1968: Johnson C. Smith University, Charlotte, NC "Encounters"
- 1992: Delta Arts Center, Winston-Salem, NC
- 2001: Phoenix Art Museum, Phoenix, AZ " Eye of Shamba; A 65 year retrospective"
- 2014: Harvey B. Gantt Center, Charlotte, NC "The Identity of a Master: Dr. J. Eugene Grigsby, Jr"
- 2015: University of North Carolina, Chapel Hill, NC "Selected Works of J. Eugene Grigsby, Jr.: Returning to Where the Artistic Seed Was Planted"

== Selected awards ==
- 1958: One of 6 artists selected by Museum of Modern Art to represent United States at World's Fair in Brussels
- 1966: National Gallery of Art's 25th Anniversary Medallion of Merit
- 1988: National Art Educator of the Year from National Art Education Association
- 1992: Historymaker by Arizona Historical Society
- 2007: "Distinguished Contributions to African-American Art and Education" from Congressional Black Caucus' Celebration of Leadership in the Fine Arts
- 2012: Mayor's Art Award, Phoenix, AZ (now the Eugene Grigsby Visual Art Award)
