= Adam Perez Diaz =

Arizona politician (1909–2010)

Phoenix City Council
- In office 1953–1957

Phoenix Vice-Mayor
- In office 1953–1957

Personal details
- Born: September 2, 1909 Flagstaff, Arizona, US
- Died: March 5, 2010 (aged 100) Phoenix, Arizona, US
- Resting place: Greenwood/Memory Lawn Mortuary & Cemetery
- Party: Democratic
- Spouse(s): Phyllis Amada Diaz; Francis Z. Diaz

Adam Perez Diaz (September 2, 1909 – March 5, 2010) was the first Hispanic elected to the Phoenix City Council and also the first Hispanic to serve as Phoenix's Vice-Mayor. Diaz was appointed to the National Council on Aging by President Bill Clinton. Díaz was among the first seven recipients of the Profiles of Success Hispanic Leadership Award's in the Hall of Fame category.

== Early years ==
Diaz was born to José Perez and Soledad Díaz Palacios in Flagstaff, Arizona. He was the second of five siblings born to Jose and Soledad. His parents fled from Mexico in 1908 because they feared that Mexican dictator Porfirio Díaz would condemn them for their support of an armed insurrection against him. He was the first out of his five siblings to be born in the United States; his sister Aurora was born in Mexico in 1906.

== Move to Phoenix ==
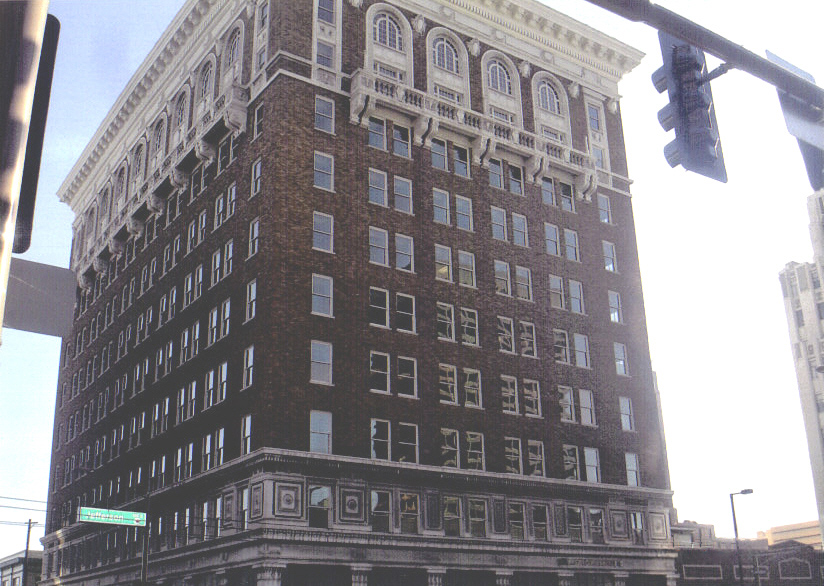
Luhrs Building

In 1910, the family moved to Phoenix, where his father José was hired as an Arizona Eastern Railway's roundhouse operator. During this period of time, Diaz's siblings Salamon, Moises, Samuel, and Virgil Joseph were born.

The family worshiped at Saint Mary's Basilica, built in 1914. The segregated and discriminatory practices of the time were not only limited to the city. The Catholic Church in Phoenix also discriminated against Hispanics. For example, the children of Mexican immigrants were not allowed to receive their First Communion with the rest of the children. They were sent to the church's basement while a separate ceremony was held above them for the children of Caucasians. After experiencing discrimination there, Soledad and other Mexican women began selling enchiladas, tamales and other food to raise money to build a new Catholic church. The construction of this church, which was named Immaculate Heart of Mary Catholic Church, was finished in 1928 and is located at 909 E. Washington St.

In 1920, José found a job at the Luhrs Building, but the family continued to struggle economically. Adam Díaz attended Washington and Monroe elementary schools, but dropped out of school after completing the 8th grade to help his family financially. He went to work as a messenger boy for Western Union. It so happened that the Western Union office was located inside the Luhrs Building where his father worked.

Díaz was working there when he met George Luhrs Jr. In 1924, the Luhrs Building was in need of an elevator operator and Mr. Luhrs offered him the job, which he accepted. The Gregg Shorthand School, was located on the second floor of the Luhrs Building. Díaz enrolled in the school and took typing and bookkeeping classes. He became a close friend of Mr. Luhrs and eventually became Property Manager of the Luhrs Properties.

Díaz met Feliz Amada and married her in 1929 in the newly constructed Immaculate Heart of Mary Catholic Church. The couple had four children, Mary Louise, Sally (Díaz) Feight, Olivia, and José.

== Politics ==
External videos
- 1999 documentary about Diaz produced by the Arizona Historical League (YouTube)

Díaz insisted that his younger siblings continue their education, even though he himself had dropped out of school and was working. He found out from his siblings and the neighborhood kids that the school children were not being well-fed. He decided to help feed the hungry children by setting up a food stand across the street from the school with the help of three companies who agreed to sell him hot dogs, buns, and mustard at discounted prices. He then co-founded the Lowell-Grant Neighborhood Council. The council's objective was to bring both parents and teachers together in order to find a way to encourage kids to stay in school.

=== Phoenix City Council ===
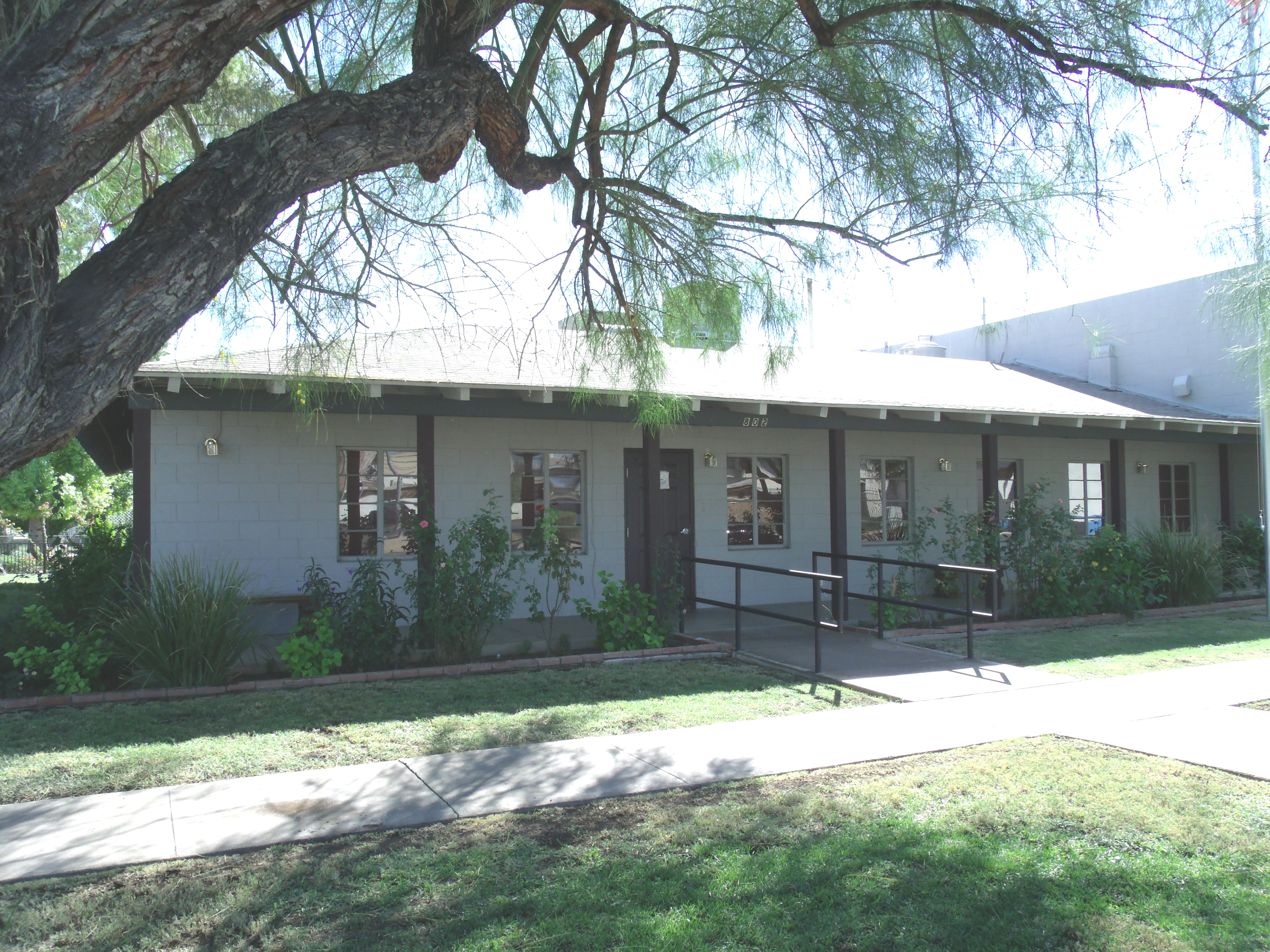
The Friendly House

While working at the Luhrs Building Díaz met Barry Goldwater. Goldwater saw in Díaz someone who had political potential. In 1948, Goldwater encouraged him to joined Phoenix's Charter Government Committee (designed to rid the city government of corruption). During this time, Díaz also became interested in the goodwill activities of the Friendly House and in 1948, headed the Board of Trustees. The Friendly House was established in 1922 by the Phoenix Americanization Committee, presided over by Placida Garcia Smith with the help of Mary Garcia to assist immigrants in transitioning their lives to Arizona. He played an instrumental role in repairing the historic building. Díaz was the recipient of the organization's first Placida Smith Award.

In 1953, Díaz became a candidate to serve on the Phoenix City Council. It was a time when Phoenix was segregated. Hispanics, African-Americans and Whites could only live in segregated neighborhoods. However, Díaz was elected and he became the first Hispanic to serve on the City Council and the first Hispanic to serve as Vice-Mayor of Phoenix. The last time that Phoenix had an elected city official that was Hispanic was in 1885, when Henry Garfias worked his last year as city marshal.

=== National Council on Aging ===
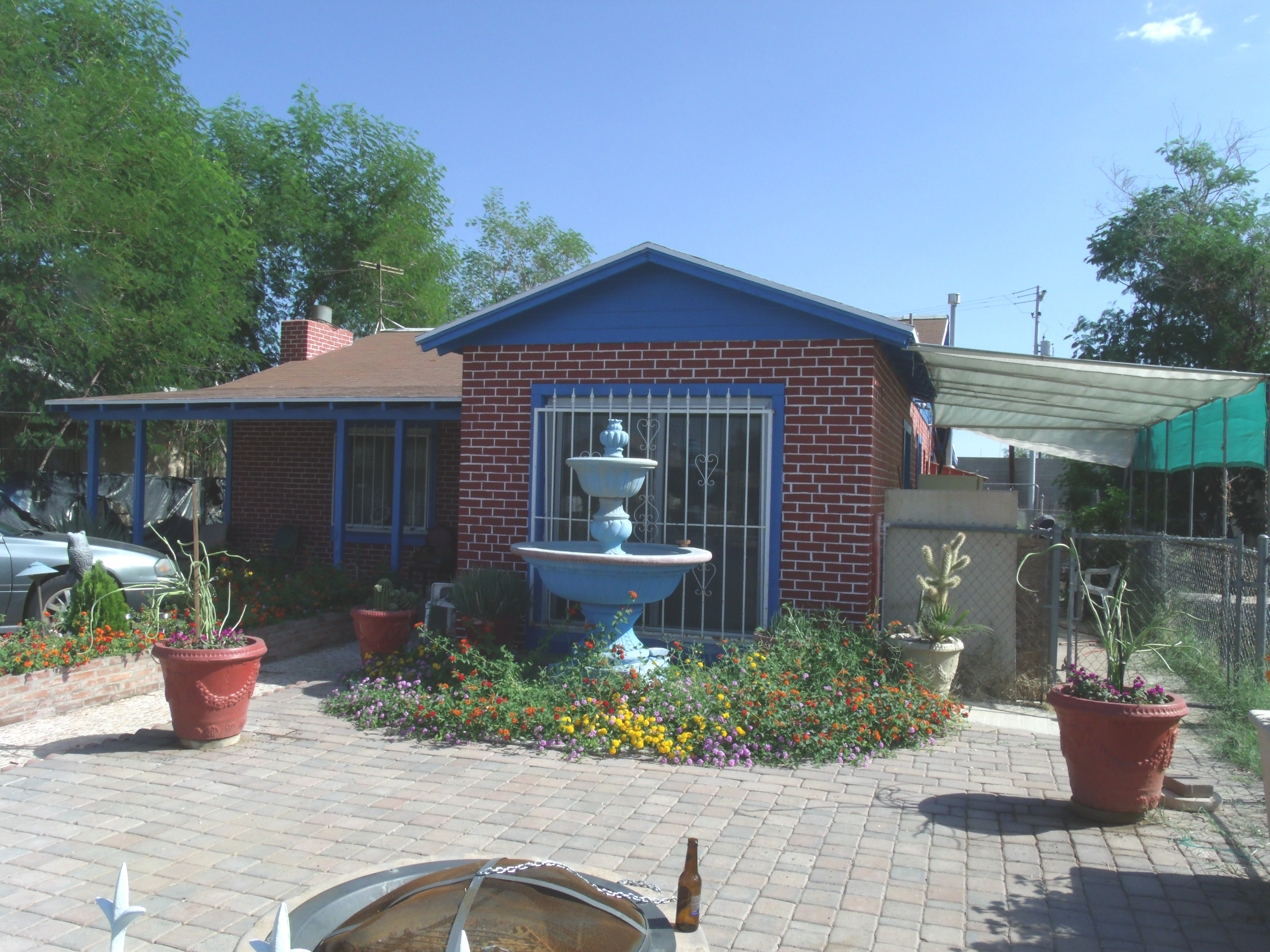
The Adam Perez Diaz House. This property is recognized as historic by the "Hispanic American Historic Property Survey of the City of Phoenix".

Díaz continued to serve as a public servant throughout his life and remained politically active. During the decade of the 1950s he became the first Hispanic to serve on the Phoenix Elementary School District's governing board. He encouraged highly educated Hispanics to take an active role within the city's educational administration.

He later served on the Board of Directors of "Chicanos por la Causa". In the 1960s he headed the "Viva Kennedy" campaign in Arizona. The Viva Kennedy campaign was a Mexican-American outreach program run by the presidential campaign of Senator John F. Kennedy from 1959 to 1963. The "Viva Kennedy" campaign functioned in the format of clubs networked across the Southwest, working to register Latino voters and gain the Latino vote for Kennedy in the 1960 Presidential election against Richard Nixon. Díaz also ran for the Arizona State Senate in District 8-B.

During the administration of President Bill Clinton, Díaz was appointed to serve in the National Council on Aging, a nonprofit advocacy and service organization that focuses its efforts on improving the health and economic security of millions of struggling older adults. Members of the council participate in the White House Conference on Aging (WHCOA) which is held every 10 years.

== Later years ==
Díaz received many honors and recognition during his lifetime. He was one of the first seven recipients of the Profiles of Success Hispanic Leadership Award's under the Hall of Fame category. The others were former Arizona Governor Raúl Héctor Castro, Maria Luisa Urquides, Bennie Gonzales, Dr. Maria Vega, Ruben Perez and Medal of Honor recipient Silvestre Herrera.

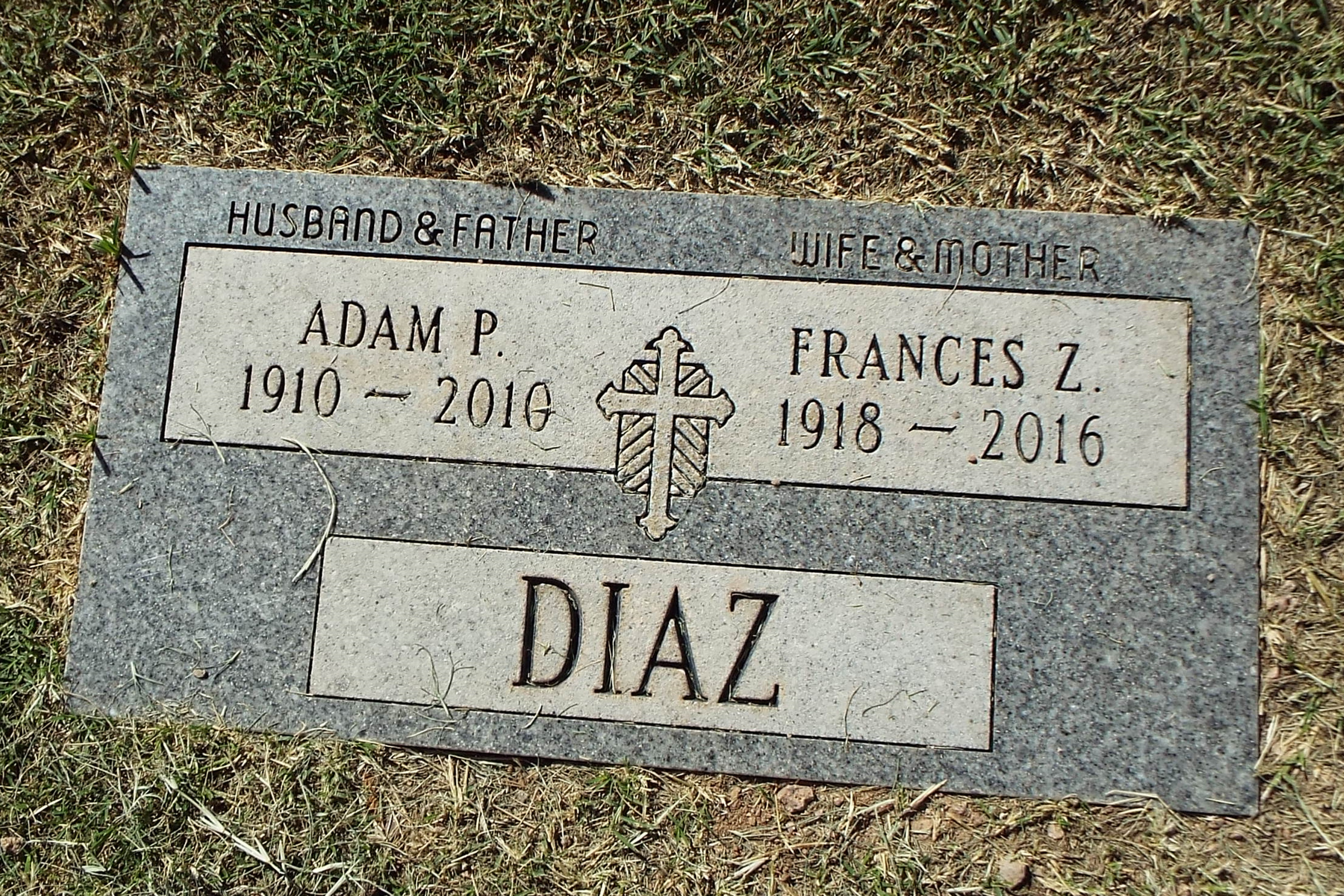
Grave of Adam Perez Diaz and Frances Z. Diaz

On September 1, 1994, he received a "Special Recognition of Excellence" which was presented by National Hispanic Heritage Month's Profiles of Success. On February 27, 1999, he was awarded a certificate recognizing him as an Arizona Historymaker by the Arizona Historical League. In 2007, the city of Phoenix named the Adam Díaz Senior Center in his honor.

Díaz met a lady who was known as Frances Z. and married her. On March 5, 2010, he became ill and died surrounded by family in his home in Phoenix. He was buried in St. Francis Catholic Cemetery in Phoenix. Frances, his second wife, died in 2016 and is buried alongside of him.

== See also ==
- Arizona
- List of historic properties in Phoenix
- Wing F. Ong
