= Mary Green (settler) =

Early Arizona pioneer

Mary Green (ca 1840s – 1912) was the first African-American settler to the Arizona Territory. A formerly enslaved woman from the American south, she later became the first black pioneer to own land in Tempe, Arizona and the mother of the first African-American child born in Arizona. Today, Tempe's Mary and Moses Green Park is named after her.

== Biography ==
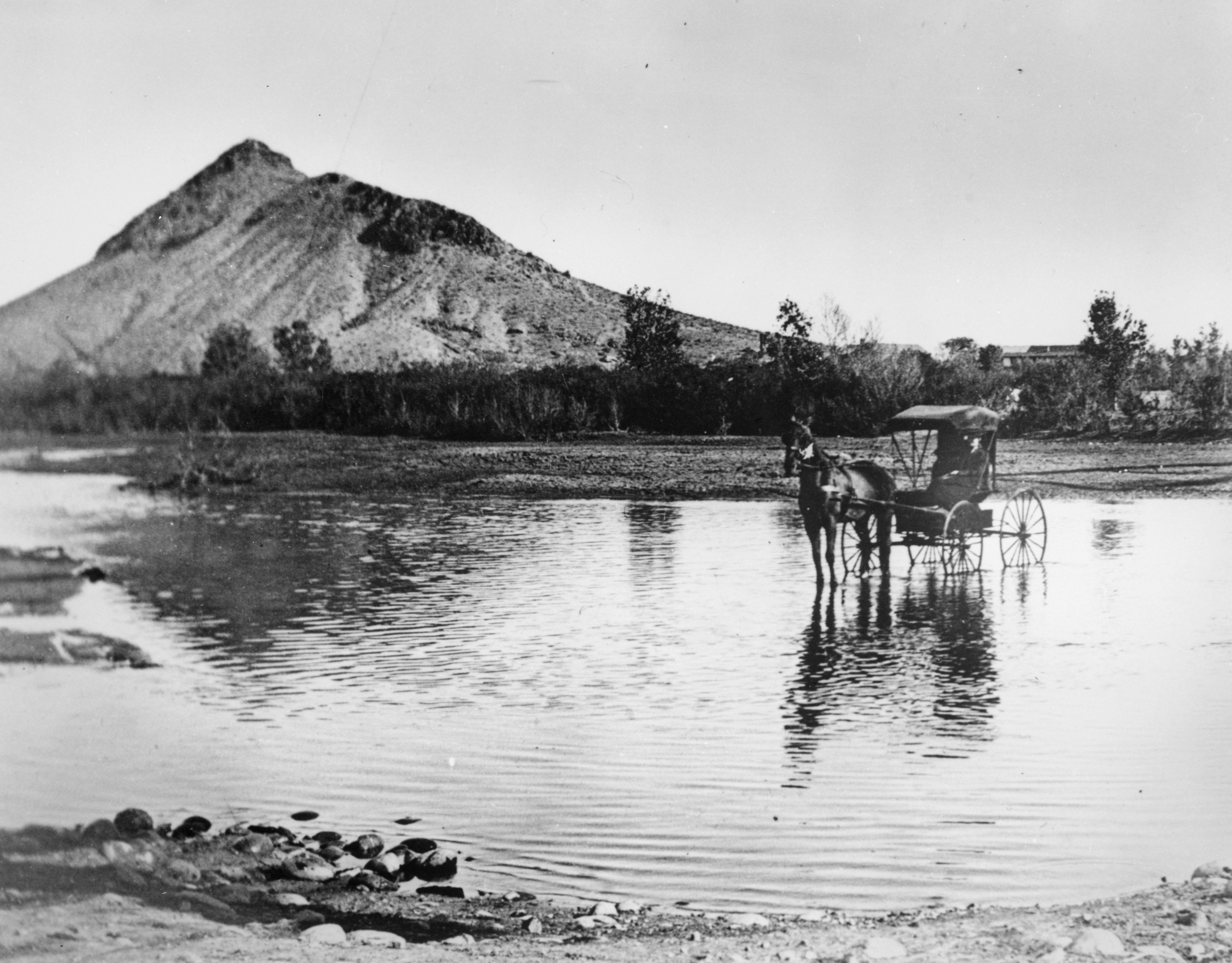
Tempe, Arizona in the 1870s, just before Mary Green made her homestead claim.

Mary Green was born into slavery in the 1840s. By the 1860s she was a domestic worker employed by the Columbus Harrison and Marcy Adeline Norris Gray family. Columbus Gray was a former Confederate officer from Arkansas. The Grays, along with Green and her two children, arrived in the Salt River Valley area that is today's Phoenix on August 18, 1968. They travelled via mule wagon from Union County, Arkansas.

She remained in the employ of the Gray family in the Phoenix area at least until 1887. Green was believed to be illiterate. In 1870, Mary's son Moses was recognized as the first African-American birth in Arizona Territory.

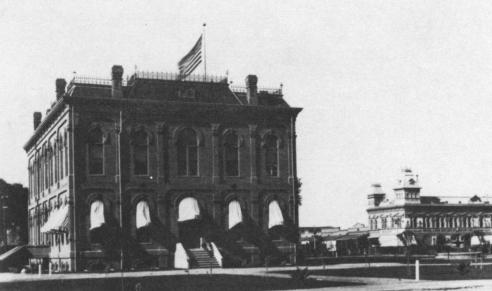
Phoenix, Arizona's City Hall pictured in the 1890s

In 1888, Mary Green became the first black pioneer to file a homestead claim in Tempe, Arizona. That year, she claimed 160 acres of land in Tempe's outskirts for herself and her six children. In 1900, Mary relocated to Phoenix, but her children remained in the Tempe area where they would become ranchers in the Kyrene district.

Mary died in 1912 and is interred in Phoenix's Greenwood Cemetery.

In 2023, the City of Tempe's City Council renamed the former Harelson Park to Mary and Moses Green Park to recognize Mary and her son Moses as the first African American landowners in what is now Tempe.

== See also ==
- Helen K. Mason, Green's great-granddaughter
- Clara Brown, First black settler to Colorado, who arrived in the territory as a domestic servant as Green did.
