= Calvin C. Goode municipal building =

Government office building in Phoenix, Arizona

Calvin C. Goode Municipal Building
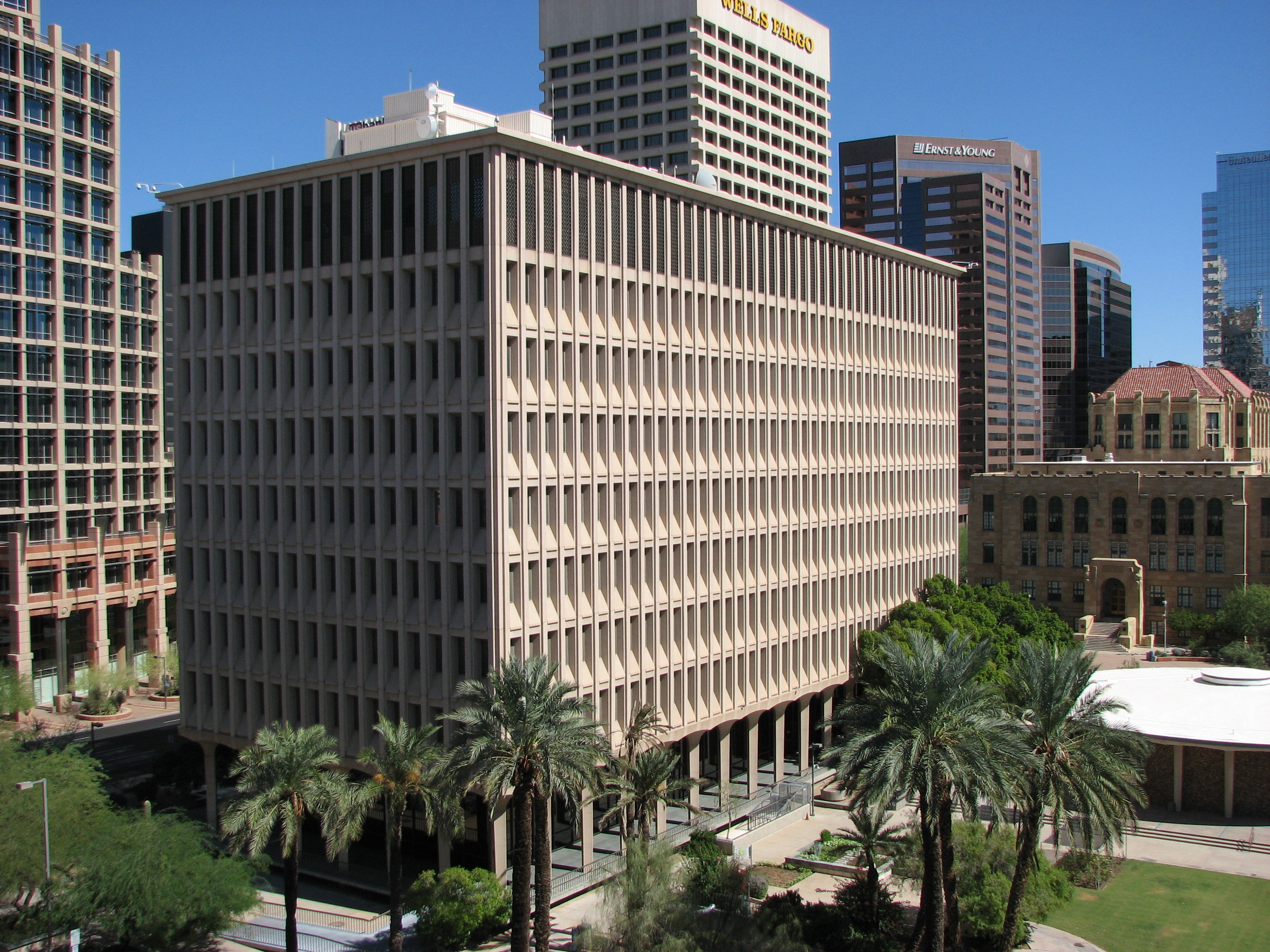
- Goode Municipal Building (center) with Counsel Chambers (at lower right)
- Interactive map of the Calvin C. Goode Municipal Building area
- Former names: Phoenix Municipal Building, City Hall

General information
- Location: Phoenix, Arizona, 251 West Washington Street
- Coordinates: 33.44791244877181°N 112.07721159685057°W
- Named for: Calvin C. Goode
- Groundbreaking: 1961
- Completed: 1963
- Cost: $4,500,000
- Owner: City of Phoenix

Height
- Height: 123.66 ft

Technical details
- Floor count: 10

Design and construction
- Architects: Ralph Haver & Associates, Edward L. Varney Associates
- Structural engineer: Charles R. Magadini & Associates
- Main contractor: TGK Construction Co. Inc., Manhattan-Dickmann Construction Co.

The Calvin C. Goode municipal building is a 10 story government office building located in Downtown Phoenix, Arizona. It opened in 1963 as the Phoenix Municipal Building and originally served as the city hall. The property also contains the Phoenix City Council Chambers in a separate circular outbuilding.

== Design and construction ==
With the rapid growth of Phoenix after World War II the old County-City Administration Building had become inadequate. In the late 1940s the city began exploring the possibility of building a new city hall. In April 1957 $4.3 Million in Bonds was approved by voters to build a new city hall. The City of Phoenix selected the local architecture firms of Ralph Haver & Associates and Edward L. Varney Associates to design the new complex. Haver and Varney's design consisted of the 10 story Municipal building which would house city offices on floors one through eight, and the office of the mayor on the ninth floor. The tenth floor contains an employee cafeteria as well as the buildings necessary mechanical equipment. The complex also contains the Phoenix City Council Chambers in a separate outbuilding that is circular in design. The design of the municipal building and council chambers was approved by voters in December 1960. The construction of the complex would be handled in two separate contracts. TGK Construction Company Inc. was awarded the contract to build the 10 story municipal building, while Manhattan-Dickmann Construction Company was awarded the contract to build the counsel chambers. Upon completion in 1963 the complex won several awards from the American Institute of Architects.

== Renaming and current use ==
The building would later be renamed in honor of Calvin C. Goode (1927–2020) who was the second African American to serve on the city counsel. Goode was on the council from 1972–1994. In 1994 after completion of the current Phoenix City Hall, the Goode building became space for additional city offices and services. The City Council still meets in the Council Chambers in the complex.
