= Carver High School (Phoenix, Arizona) =

Former school in Phoenix, Arizona, United States

George Washington Carver High School
- Phoenix Union Colored High School
- U.S. National Register of Historic Places
- Location within Arizona Location within the United States
- Location: 415 E. Grant Street, Phoenix, Arizona, U.S.
- Coordinates: 33.4406°N 112.0682°W
- Area: 4.9 acres (2.0 ha)
- Built: 1926
- Architect: Pierson & Johnson
- Architectural style: 20th Century Commercial
- NRHP reference No.: 91000543
- Added to NRHP: May 2, 1991

Carver High School (full name George Washington Carver High School, formerly known as Phoenix Union Colored High School) was a public high school in Phoenix, Arizona, established to serve African-American students during a time of school segregation. The school was constructed in 1926.

The school's building was the only one built in the state of Arizona, exclusively to serve African American high school students.

Since 1996, the building has been home to the George Washington Carver Museum and Cultural Center.

== Historic site ==
The school was built on the site of a former four-acre landfill, and was surrounded by warehouses. The school board purchased the site in 1925 for $10,500. The Phoenix-based architectural firm of Fitzhugh and Byron was chosen to draw up the plans. The firm, which included Lee Mason Fitzhugh (1877-1937) and Lester A. Byron (1889-1963), were designers of commercial, residential, and community buildings in Phoenix and around the state of Arizona from the 1910s through the mid-1930s.

Students who attended classes at the school said the school was built in between the two African American communities south of Downtown Phoenix at the time, and was strategically placed to serve as many African American students as possible.

There were initial protests to the location, due to its proximity to industrial and contaminated area. Even the school board admitted at the time that the location would require "watchmen to protect children going to and from school", and physicians declared the location a "hot bed and nucleus of virulent contagious diseases".

The school was built by general contractors Pierson & Johnson, who submitted a bid of $110,000. The school was remodeled and enlarged in 1948, which included the building of new shop facilities, as well as a 1,000-seat stadium.

After the school's closure, school grounds were converted into office and storage space.

The school building, along with the land it sits on, was listed on the National Register of Historic Places in 1991.

The school grounds were purchased by the Phoenix Monarchs Alumni Association, a group of Carver High alumni, in 1996. The school's alumni collected US$200,000, including a grant by the city's Parks and Recreation Board, to buy the building. Work began in 2001 to convert the site into a community cultural center and art gallery, in a partnership with the City of Phoenix which involved several million dollars of Phoenix bond funding, along with other grants.

A report by Phoenix NPR station KJZZ noted that the school campus could have been demolished, had efforts to save it fail to materialize.

Currently, the former school's main building and shop building still exist., While the school's football field has been paved over, the nearby grandstand still exists.

The campus was added to the Phoenix Historic Property Register, after the Phoenix City Council approved the addition in March 2017. This will protect the school campus from demolition, as well as making the site eligible for city incentives to help with rehabilitation.

== School ==
George Washington Carver High School
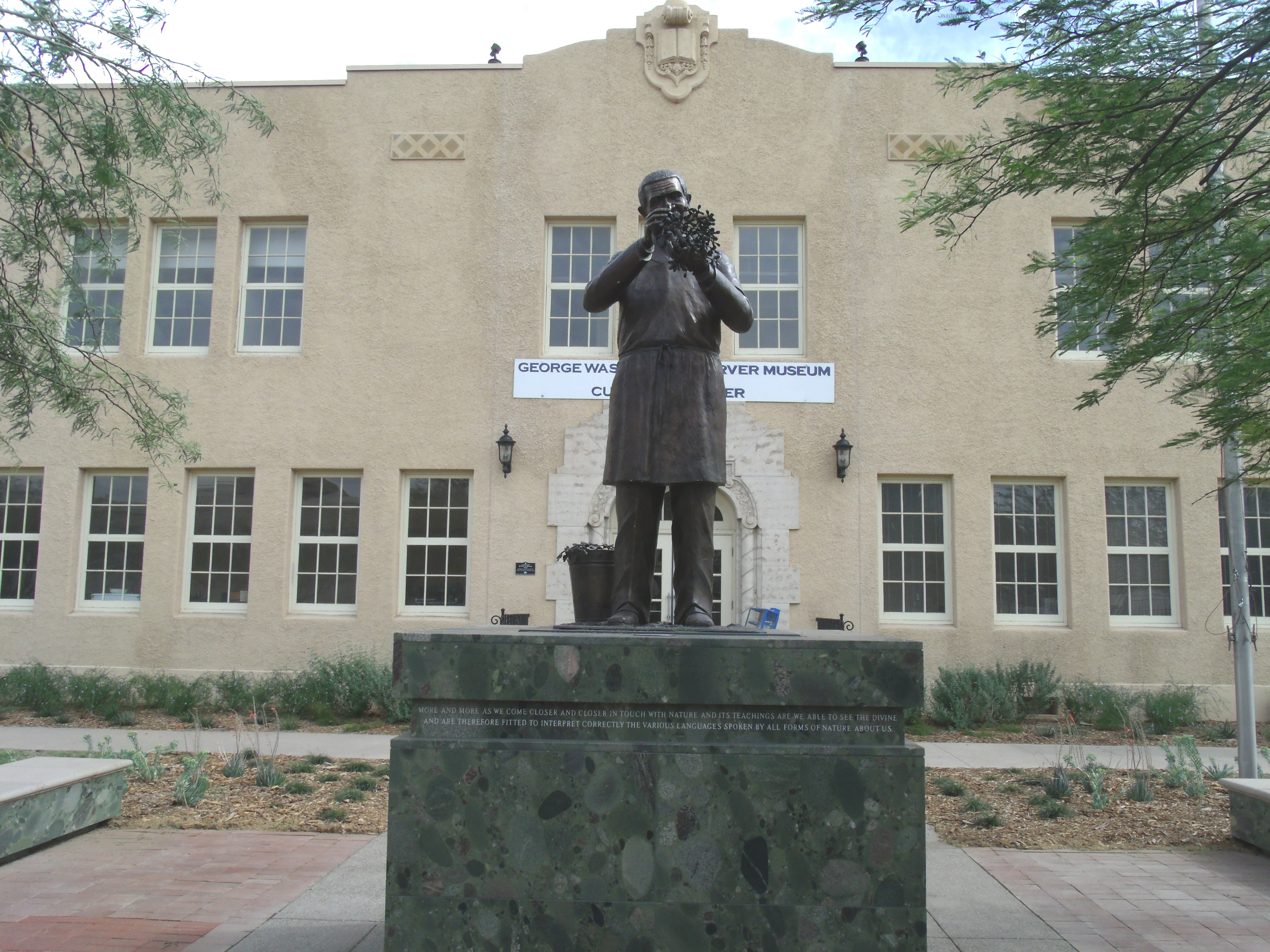

Information
- Former name: Phoenix Union Colored High School (1926–1943)
- Type: Public, segregated
- Established: 13 September 1926
- Closed: 1954
- Enrollment: 406 (1954)
- Mascot: Monarchs

In 1909, before Arizona gained statehood, the Arizona territory passed a law that said segregation in elementary schools was legal when there were more than 8 African Americans. However, segregation of high schools was never required under Arizona law.

During the 1920s and late 1910s, African American students were segregated in the cellar of Phoenix Union High School, as in many other schools in Arizona at the time.

Carver High had its roots in the "Department for Colored Students" that was established at a rear room of Phoenix Union High School's Commercial Building in 1918, with one teacher. The school's African American students were then housed in two small cottages that was separated from the PUHS campus by an irrigation ditch, and later housed the students at a house on 9th Street and Jefferson.

The school opened in 1926, costing the district $150,000. According to Phoenix Union High School District, the school was built to accommodate the district's African American population. Many contemporary sources, however, state that the school was built to segregate African American high school students. Another possible reason may be that the two races broke out into frequent fights at school. The school was the only legally segregated high school in Phoenix, and it opened following anti-African American sentiments that increased after World War I.

This new school was dedicated on September 10, 1926, in a huge ceremony. Almost 350 people packed into the auditorium of the new Phoenix Union Colored High School. The school would have more teachers, more equipment, and sports teams. Most importantly, the school had new AC System. However, the sports teams were not allowed to play with White sports teams, the games were between Mexican and Native American students, who also went to segregated schools.

The school's final location opened for classes on September 14.

The school was renamed after George Washington Carver in 1943, the year in which Carver died, with the hiring of W. A. Robinson, an accomplished educator, and it was closed in 1954, a year after a judge at the Maricopa County Superior Court ruled school segregation in Phoenix high schools was unconstitutional, in the case Phillips vs. Phoenix Union High Schools and Junior College District.

To this day, Phoenix Union High School District's website makes few references to the school's segregated past, merely stating that the school closed, following integration.

== Education ==
The school was known for its strong academics and athletic programs, despite having deficient resources, like microscopes.

In 1943, after W. A. Robinson became principal, many students and teachers recall that he recruited teachers from all across the country. Many of the recruited teachers there held Master's degrees, at a time when few did.

=== In popular culture ===
A basketball game between the team at Carver High and a team composed mostly of Mexican and Mexican American teenagers at Miami High School in Miami, Arizona was the subject of the play The Mighty Vandals, which was shown at the Herberger Theater in Phoenix and Miami High School.

== Integration ==
In 1950, two African Americans, Hayzel Burton Daniels and Carl Sims, were elected to the Arizona state legislature. To end “separate-but-equal” once and for all, Daniels and two White attorneys, with the help of several Arizonan civil rights organizations, filed a lawsuit on June 9, 1952. They argued that,

"The high schools of Phoenix, Maricopa, Arizona, set apart for White students…are superior to the schools set apart for the African race. Segregation of African pupils by race has a detrimental effect on such African pupils, imparting to them a stigma of inferiority, retarding their educational and mental development, and depriving them of some of the benefits they would receive in an integrated school system.”

On February 8, 1953, Judge Struckmeyer ruled that the 1909 segregation law was unconstitutional, and that all high schools would have to integrate as soon as possible. This was more than a year before the United States Supreme Court decided the case of Brown v. Board of Education.

After that, Arizonan activist organizations set out to integrate elementary schools as well.

On May 5, 1954, Superior Court Judge Charles Bernstein determined in Heard v. Davis that all elementary school segregation in Arizona violated the 14th Amendment. The decision came 12 days before the Supreme Court's landmark Brown v. Board of Education ruling, declaring racial segregation of schools unconstitutional. While preparing for their decision, the Supreme Court requested a copy of Judge Bernstein's opinion.

Brown v. Board of Education was an important turning point of the Civil Rights movement. This case was not only the first step toward desegregation, but it was also the first step to breaking other barriers of discrimination for other minorities as well.

== Notable people ==
- Betty Fairfax, educator
- Calvin C. Goode, Phoenix City Councilman
- J. Eugene Grigsby, faculty member, artist and art educator
- Charles "Chuck" Harrison, industrial designer
- Ira O’Neal, a member of the Tuskegee Airmen.
- Coy Payne, former mayor of Chandler, Arizona and first African-American to be elected as mayor in Arizona.
- William Byron Rumford, pharmacist, politician, first African American elected to a state public office in Northern California
- Ed Shivers, a member of the Tuskegee Airmen.
- Helen K. Mason, founder of Arizona's Black Theatre Troupe

== See also ==
- Phoenix Union High School, also NRHP-listed
- List of museums focused on African Americans
