= Jeffrey Trent =

American geneticist

Jeffrey M. Trent is the founding president and director of the Translational Genomics Research Institute. He has been vice president and Research Director of the Van Andel Institute since 2009. He was the founding director of NIH's National Human Genome Research Institute in 1993.

Trent received his BS from Indiana University, Bloomington and his MS and PhD in genetics from the University of Arizona.

He was the National Human Genome Research Institute's (NHGRI) founding scientific director, working there from 1993 to 2002, before becoming the founding director of TGen. NHGRI established the annual Jeffrey M. Trent Lecture in Cancer Research in 2003, given annually by a prominent cancer researcher. Some of the lecturers over the past 12 years include Stephen Chanock, Bert Vogelstein, Christopher Amos, Charles Sawyers, Carol Greider, Brian Druker, Eric Lander, Michael Stratton, Harold Varmus, Lee Hartwell, and Janet Rowley.

He also previously worked at University of Arizona, where he was deputy director and Director for Basic Science of the Arizona Comprehensive Cancer Center, and the University of Michigan, where he held the E. Maisel Endowed Professorship in Cancer Genetics, Professor of Human Genetics and Radiation Oncology, Head of the Cancer Biology Division of the Department of Radiation Oncology, and deputy director and Director of Basic Research for the Michigan Comprehensive Cancer Center. He is a principal investigator of Stand Up To Cancer's Melanoma Dream Team with Patricia M. LoRusso.

His research focuses on the genetic mutations that contribute to cancer susceptibility.
