= Translational Genomics Research Institute =

Research institute

Coordinates: 33°27′10.68″N 112°4′1.83″W

- Company type: Research Institute
- Industry: Genomics
- Founded: July 2002, Phoenix, Arizona, United States
- Headquarters: Phoenix, Arizona, United States
- Key people: Jeffrey Trent
- Revenue: ▲$51.7 million (2007); $18.3 million (2003)
- Total assets: 24,398,471 United States dollar (2022)
- Number of employees: 258 (2008)
- Website: www.tgen.org

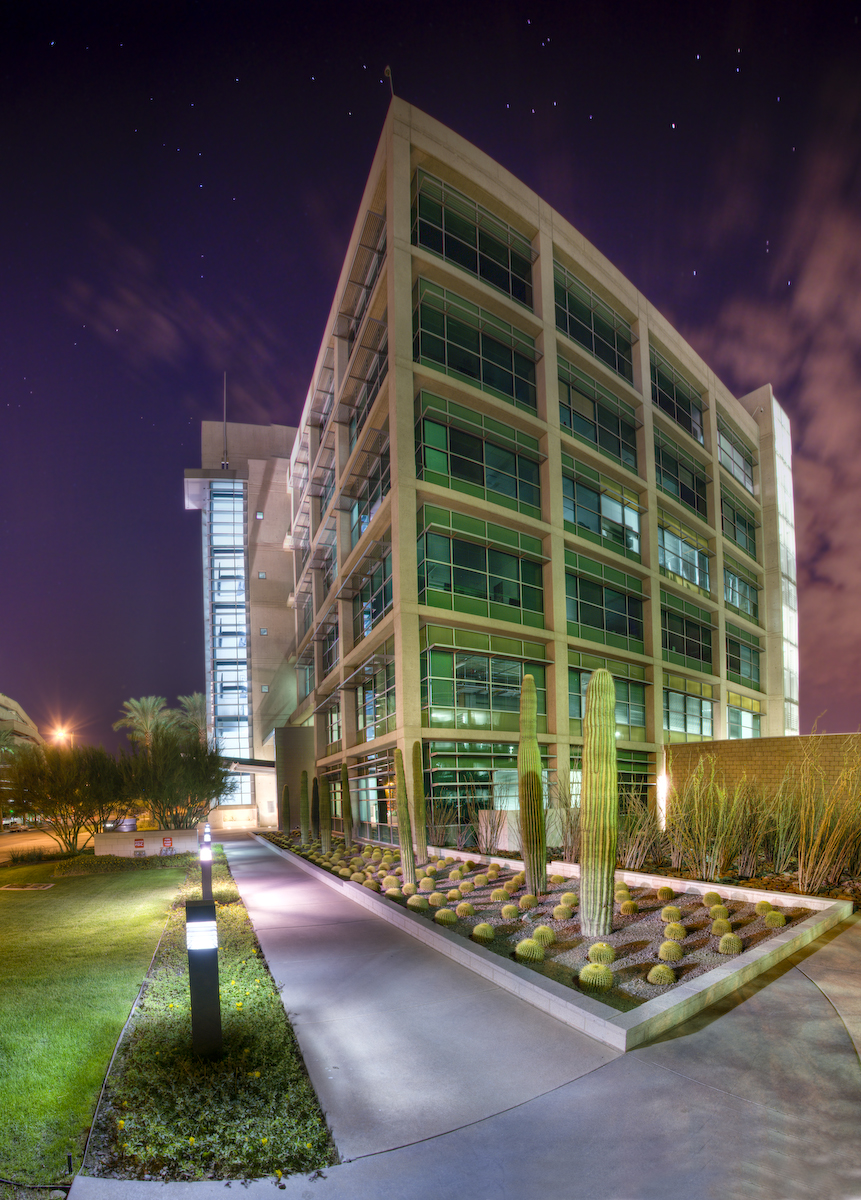
The Translational Genomics Research Institute at night

The Translational Genomics Research Institute (TGen) is a non-profit genomics research institute based in Phoenix, Arizona, United States.

== History and activities ==
TGen was established in July 2002 by Jeffrey Trent in Phoenix, Arizona, with an initial investment of US$100 million from Arizona public- and private-sector investors.

The field of translational genomics research searches for ways to apply results from the Human Genome Project to the development of improved diagnostics, prognostics, and therapies for cancer, neurological disorders, diabetes and other complex diseases.

The mission of TGen is to make and translate genomic discoveries into advances in human health. TGen has contributed to the growth of scientific research and biotechnology in Arizona. The institute has been involved in collaborations and studies, such as the research on chronic traumatic encephalopathy (CTE) in former NFL players in partnership with Exosome Sciences.
