= Maryvale Mall =

- Location: Phoenix, Arizona, United States
- Coordinates: 33.49738°N 112.17080°W
- Opened: 1959
- Closed: 1993
- Developer: John F. Long
- Owner: Cartwright Elementary School District
- Num. of stores: 3
- Floors: 1

Maryvale Mall, originally known as Maryvale Shopping City, was a shopping mall in the Maryvale area of Phoenix, Arizona. For a time, it was the biggest shopping mall between Dallas, Texas, and the West Coast.

The mall was located on 51st Avenue and Indian School Road. It was sold in the late-1990s to the Cartwright Elementary School District.

== History ==
=== Development ===
Maryvale Shopping City was designed by Victor Gruen and developed by home builder John F. Long, who also planned and developed Maryvale, which he named after his wife.

The mall, which was built on a lot adjacent to an earlier retail development by Long that opened in 1956, was developed a way to give Maryvale residents a convenient place to shop. At the time, Maryvale was located west of the Phoenix city limits, and residents faced about a 20-minute drive to stores in Downtown Phoenix.

The shopping center was developed with 19 stores, 111,000 square feet (10,300 m^{2}) of retail space and 1,100 parking spaces, which included two supermarkets and a bowling alley.

Plans for the shopping center's development were announced on July 26, 1958. At the time of the announcement, two stores, S. S. Kresge (later known as KMart) and Piggly Wiggly, were announced as tenants.

The shopping center's grand opening was a star-studded affair, as it was attended by Jim Backus, Jill St. John, and George Raft.

In 1974, the bowling alley was converted to a department store, in a project that carried a multi-million dollar price tag.

=== Conversion to indoor mall ===
In the late 1970s, Maryvale Shopping City was enclosed, expanded and given the new name Maryvale Mall, with a new wing of the mall anchored by Mervyn's.

The mall began to decline when Desert Sky Mall (originally named Westridge Mall) opened in 1981. Eventually, discount retailer Target moved into a mall that was once anchored by upscale department stores.

The mall was almost vacant by the mid 1990s, but the structure was noted to still be in good condition.

=== Redevelopment ===
In the 1990s, Long offered the mall property to Cartwright Elementary School District for $7.3M, with a stipulation that the external structure be preserved. The school district opened an elementary school and a middle school on the property between 2000 and 2001.

A former skating rink at the mall was converted to the district's first gymnasium, while a former movie theater became an auditorium. The parking lots were converted into athletic fields.

== See also ==
- Park Central Mall
- Chris-Town Mall
