= Glendale High School (Glendale, Arizona) =

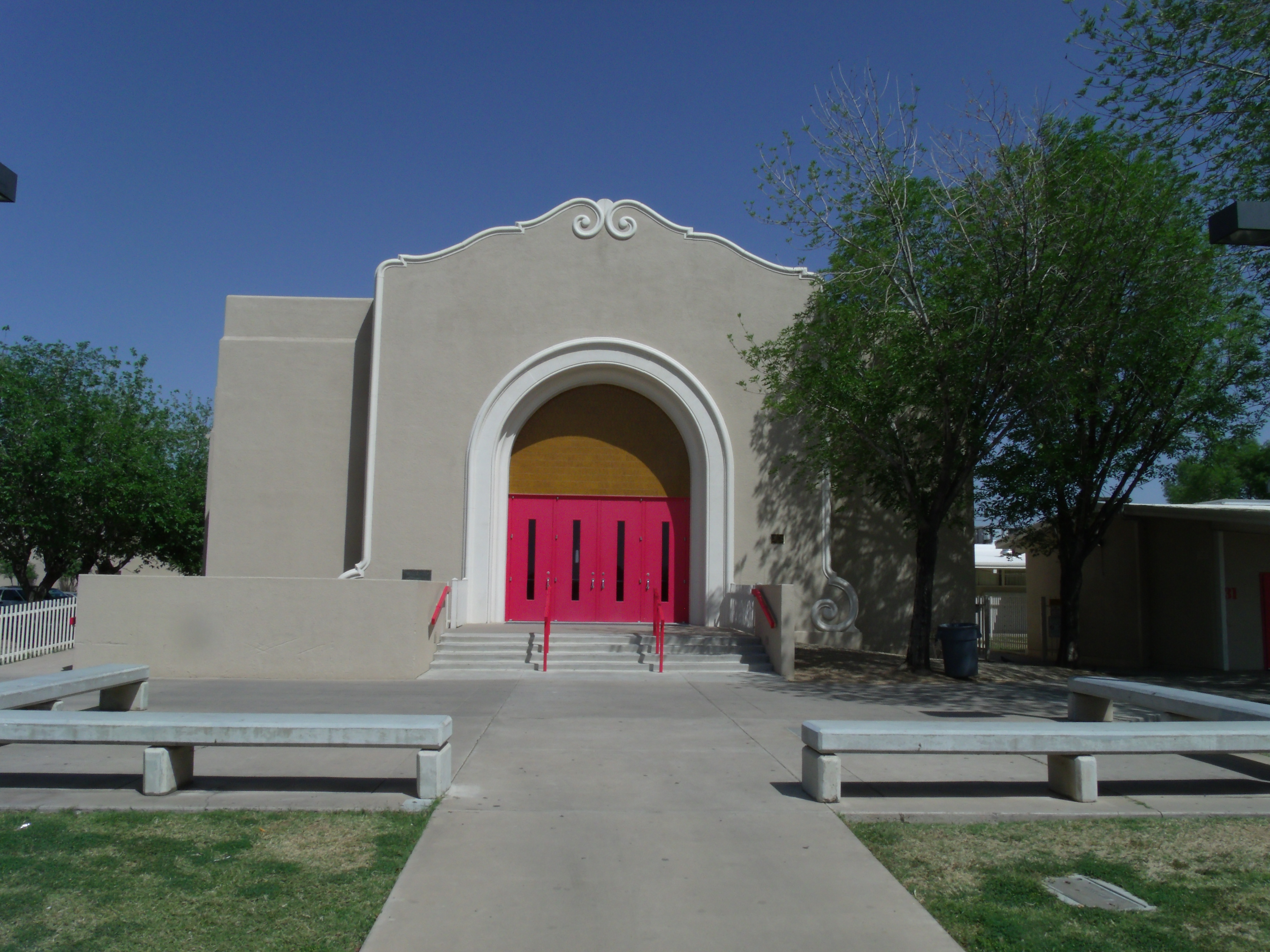
- Historic Glendale High School Auditorium

Location
- 6216 West Glendale Avenue; Glendale, Arizona 85301; United States; 33°32′24″N 112°11′37″W

Information
- Type: Public high school
- Motto: Motto: Education, Excellence, Opportunity
- Established: 1911; 115 years ago
- School district: Glendale Union High School District
- Principal: Tanner Linsacum
- Teaching staff: 77.00 (FTE)
- Grades: 9-12
- Enrollment: 1,813 (2023-2024)
- Student to teacher ratio: 23.55
- Colors: Crimson, white, and gold
- Athletics: Football, cross country, golf, swimming, badminton, volleyball, Cardinal Spirit Line, basketball, soccer, wrestling, track, baseball, softball, tennis
- Mascot: Cardinals
- Website: Glendale High School

Glendale High School is located in Glendale, Arizona, United States, and is part of the Glendale Union High School District. It was founded in 1911 and is the oldest Arizona high school which still remains on its original site, having been established at Glendale and Grand Avenues in the fall of 1912.

The high school's auditorium is listed on the National Register of Historic Places in Arizona.

== Feeder patterns ==
Schools operated by the Glendale Elementary School District feed into Glendale High School.

Elementary schools that feed into Glendale include:

- Desert Garden Elementary School (K-3)
- Smith Elementary School (K-8)
- Harold W. Smith (K-8)

Middle schools include:

- Challenger Middle School (4-8)
- Don Mensendick Middle School (4-8)

K-8 schools include:

- Desert Spirit
- Glendale American School
- Horizon School
- Imes School
- Landmark School
- Sine School
- Sunset Vista

== Sports ==
=== Fall sports ===
- Badminton
- Cross Country
- Football
- Boys/Girls Golf
- Spiritline
- Swim & Dive
- Girls Volleyball

=== Winter sports ===
- Boys/Girls Basketball
- Boys/Girls Soccer
- Wrestling

=== Spring sports ===
- Baseball
- Softball
- Boys/Girls Tennis
- Track & Field
- Boys Volleyball

== Notable alumni ==
- William G. Bennett, gaming executive
- Lerrin LaGrow, Major League Baseball Pitcher
- John F. Long, local developer who created Maryvale, Arizona and philanthropist
- Marty Robbins, country singer
- Stephen Spinella, actor
- John Williams, pro wrestling
