= John F. Long =

American home developer and philanthropist

- Born: May 17, 1920
- Died: February 29, 2008 (aged 87)
- Education: Phoenix Union High School; Glendale High School
- Occupation: Real estate developer
- Years active: 1949-1995
- Organization: John F. Long Homes
- Spouse: Mary Tolmachoff (m. 1947; died 1998)
- Awards: National Housing Hall of Fame; Arizona Business Hall of Fame; Arizona Historymaker; Lifetime Achievement Award from Westmarc

John F. Long (17 May 1920 – 29 February 2008) was a real-estate developer, philanthropist, and late-date pioneer of the West Valley of the Phoenix metropolitan area. He is most often remembered for being the founder and primary developer of Maryvale, an urban village spanning Phoenix and Glendale. He is often considered the “Father of the West Valley.”

== Early life ==
John Frederick Pilger was born on May 17, 1920, in Phoenix, Arizona to German immigrant parents. His parents moved to Arizona in the early 1900s, under doctor's orders due to his father's tuberculosis, and because he already had an uncle living in Phoenix. His father would die when John was just 22 months old, leading him to never really know his father. When his mother remarried, John took his stepfather's surname name, Long. He was the oldest of four children.

At age eight, Long began selling papers for the Phoenix Gazette to earn some money. With his parents often working on farms, he would also sometimes help out, milking cows, feeding chickens, and working in the fields. Long's parents working in agriculture resulted in the family moving frequently, leading them to live all around the state in places such as Globe and Flagstaff. This meant that Long attended six different grade schools. In Phoenix, Long remembers swimming in the CAP canals and playing baseball and running track in high school. Long began high school at Phoenix Union High School but eventually moved to Glendale High School, graduating there in 1939.

== Maryvale ==
After returning home from World War II, Long began building a house near 23rd Avenue and Glendale Avenue in Phoenix. Before he and his wife had moved into their new home, the couple had numerous offers to sell. Long and his wife decided to sell the home for $8,450, doubling their initial cost and using the profit to build their next home that they then sold, building 12 homes before finally buying a home for themselves. In 1949, Long built 32 more homes, starting his first subdivision, Glenwood Terrace, where homes sold for under $7000. Long would build 2 more subdivisions before planning his biggest project, Maryvale.

Plans for Maryvale began to take shape in the 1950s, when John F. Long came up with the idea of a master-planned community in the western part of the city of Phoenix. Maryvale was one of the first master-planned communities in the United States and the first in the state of Arizona. Maryvale would set the stage for what master-planned communities across the U.S. and Arizona could be. Maryvale's influence was particularly noticeable in the West Valley and can still be seen today in communities like Sun City, Verrado, and Anthem. Long aimed to turn the area into an affordable suburb, with homes generally selling for around $8,000. Maryvale was designed with the community in mind, designating space for parks, schools, and the fulfillment of other community services. After building the first few hundred homes, the local school district, Cartwright School District began to worry about the increasing population since the district did not have the funding to build new schools as needed. As a result, Long Home Builders agreed to construct the schools and lease them to the district.

Long's primary market was veterans returning from World War II, many of whom had trained in the region. Long realized that VA loans didn't cover such essentials as refrigerators and stoves, as a result he lobbied Congress to change the scope of such loans. Long Housing Co. was one of the first home builders to include appliances in their homes. The community also had amenities like a skating rink and community pools.

Marketing for the community was quite different for the time, using famous actors of that era including Pat Boone and future President Ronald Reagan. Buster Keaton also starred in a short film, The Homeowner, displaying various aspects of the community. Long also for a time offered an acre of land in Northern Arizona for anyone who bought one of his homes.

Maryvale was also home to Maryvale Shopping City, which opened in 1959. Long saw it as a central hub for his community, an open-air mall which housed 19 stores in more than 110,000 square feet of retail space. Tenants included S.S. Kresge's, the predecessor to K-Mart, and Malcolm's, Long's very own department store. The mall also featured a Bowlero bowling alley and a Lantern Inn restaurant. After the opening of Desert Sky Mall in 1981, the mall began to decline, so Long sold part of the site to the Cartwright Elementary School District in the late 1990s. The land became home to Marc T. Atkinson Middle School, which opened in 2000 and Bret R. Tarver Elementary School, which opened in 2001.

When asked where the name of the community came from, Long stated, “It's my wife's name is Mary. And Vale is a green valley. So this was a nice valley area, green, all the crops and so forth.” The initial master plan was drawn up by architect Victor Gruen. By 1956, Long was selling more than a hundred homes a week in Maryvale, making him the third-largest homebuilder in the world at one point. John F. Long Home Builders also built developments in Paradise Valley and Moon Valley during this time.

Long put a focus on solar energy and water conservation in his communities. He searched for more conservative and efficient toilets to put in his homes that used substantially less water, and was the first home builder in the United States to put solar on the roofs of some homes. The company was selected by the U.S. Department of Energy to build the world's first solar community, Solar One, a community with twenty-four homes using solar power.

Demographic changes came to the area by 1975, as residents began moving to the north Valley. Racially restrictive real estate ordinances were in place north of Van Buren Street up until the mid-1960s. When the Golden Gate Barrio was razed starting in the 1970s, many of the displaced residents moved to Maryvale. The discovery of a cancer cluster in the 1980s, originally linked to leaking chemicals from an industrial complex at 35th Avenue and Osborn Road, also saw many of the area's original residents move elsewhere.

== Personal life ==
In September 1941, Long was drafted into the U.S. military. He served as field artillery before transferring to the Army Air Corps. where he was a part of the 456th Bomber Group. He was stationed in Stornara, Italy, where he was an aircraft mechanic. Long was awarded the Distinguished Unit Badge as a member of a Liberator bomber group in 1944.

John Long met his wife, Mary Tolmachoff, at a softball game where she was playing softball for Webster's Dairy. Long was friends with Tolmachoff's cousin who suggested they go to the softball game. John ended up taking Mary home that night and the two began talking and never stopped. The two married in 1947 and had three children together, Manya, Shirley and Jacob.

== Other endeavors ==
Long founded a charitable organization, the John F. Long Foundation, in 1961.

Long served on the Glendale High School board from 1960 to 1966. After a group of parents recommended he run for an open seat on the board and considering his two youngest children about to go into high school, he saw it as his civic duty to join the board. Long also served on the Phoenix city council from 1966 to 1970. Following the death of council member Jack Laney, Mayor Milton H. Graham, reached out to Long asking him to serve the rest of the term. Long recounts, “There wasn't any...council member from the West Valley and they thought I would be a good representative.” Despite some reluctance, Long felt that it was his civil responsibility to be a representative of the West Valley and his community. While on the council, Long oversaw the early planning of the Phoenix Convention Center.

In the early 1980s, as part of his belief of conservation, he began experimenting with electric cars. When Long started selling homes with photovoltaic cells, he offered electric cars as a possible upgrade option. With help from his company's chief engineer, Al Mahin, Long offered Datsun 310s, Chevy LUVs, and Chevy Citations converted to run on electric power. On top of running on electricity coming from the homes’ solar, the car would also feature regenerative braking which will partially recharge the battery while driving, extending the cars’ range.

In 1999, Long offered to donate to the city of Peoria the grazing rights for eight square miles of state lands located in the northern part of the city. This would allow the city to maintain some authority over the future preservation of their lands, which proved important to the city since much of the area was a part of Peoria's Desert Lands Conservation Master Plan. The plan's goal is to protect the sensitive habitats of the Sonoran Desert found in Peoria by controlling development of the desert.

Long offered to donate land for a sports stadium to be built in the West Valley twice. The first time he offered to donate sixty acres of land near 75th Avenue and McDowell Road in 1986 when Phoenix was considering building a stadium in order to attract a team to the area. He would offer land again in 2000 for the Arizona Cardinals to build a stadium, when they were looking to move out of Sun Devil Stadium. He offered forty acres at 99th Avenue and Thomas Road in Avondale, only about three miles from the Cardinals' current home, State Farm Stadium, in Glendale.

Long was also a big advocate for the development of the West Valley Recreation Corridor. The corridor would have run 42 miles from Lake Pleasant in Peoria to Tres Ríos in Avondale. It would have been a cooperation between numerous West Valley cities: Avondale, El Mirage, Surprise, Glendale, Youngtown, Phoenix, and Peoria.

Some of Long's philanthropic ventures included donating labor and material for filling potholes on more than five hundred miles of streets in West Phoenix in the 1980s, as well as put up money to help the state improve the Beeline Highway in the 1990s. Long is also responsible for building and donating twenty-one townhouses to be used by the city of Phoenix's Affordable Housing Program, built and donated an Alcoholism Rehabilitation Center, and for donating 60 acres of land and lending Phoenix $10 million for Maryvale Baseball Park. The Maryvale Samaritan Medical Center received a $1.5 million donation from Long for a childbirth center. Being an Arizona native, he also frequently donated to the Arizona Historical Society Museum and other historical organizations in the state. He donated two-hundred forty acres of land to Glendale in order for the city to build Glendale Municipal Airport as part of his expansive effort to build the West Valley. Long was among the supporters and financial benefactors that helped establish ASU West; he has also given to the university's architectural and communications schools on its main campus.

== Death and legacy ==
On February 29, 2008, John F. Long died of congestive heart disease at age 87. His funeral was held at The Community Church of Joy in Glendale.

In 1954, a group of businessmen from Phoenix named Long Citizen of the Year. The U.S. Department of the Interior gave Long the Heritage Conservation and Recreation Service Award in 1980. Arizona State University presented Long with a Doctorate of Humane Letters in 1996, for his nearly half century of contributions to Arizona. Long has been inducted into the National Housing Hall of Fame and the Arizona Business Hall of Fame. He was named an Arizona Historymaker by the Arizona Historical Society in 2001, and given the very first Lifetime Achievement Award from Westmarc. Westmarc's Lifetime Achievement Award has since been renamed to the John F. Long Award.

John F. Long School, an elementary school in the area, was named after Long.
