= Tempe Diablo Stadium =

Sports venue in Tempe, Arizona

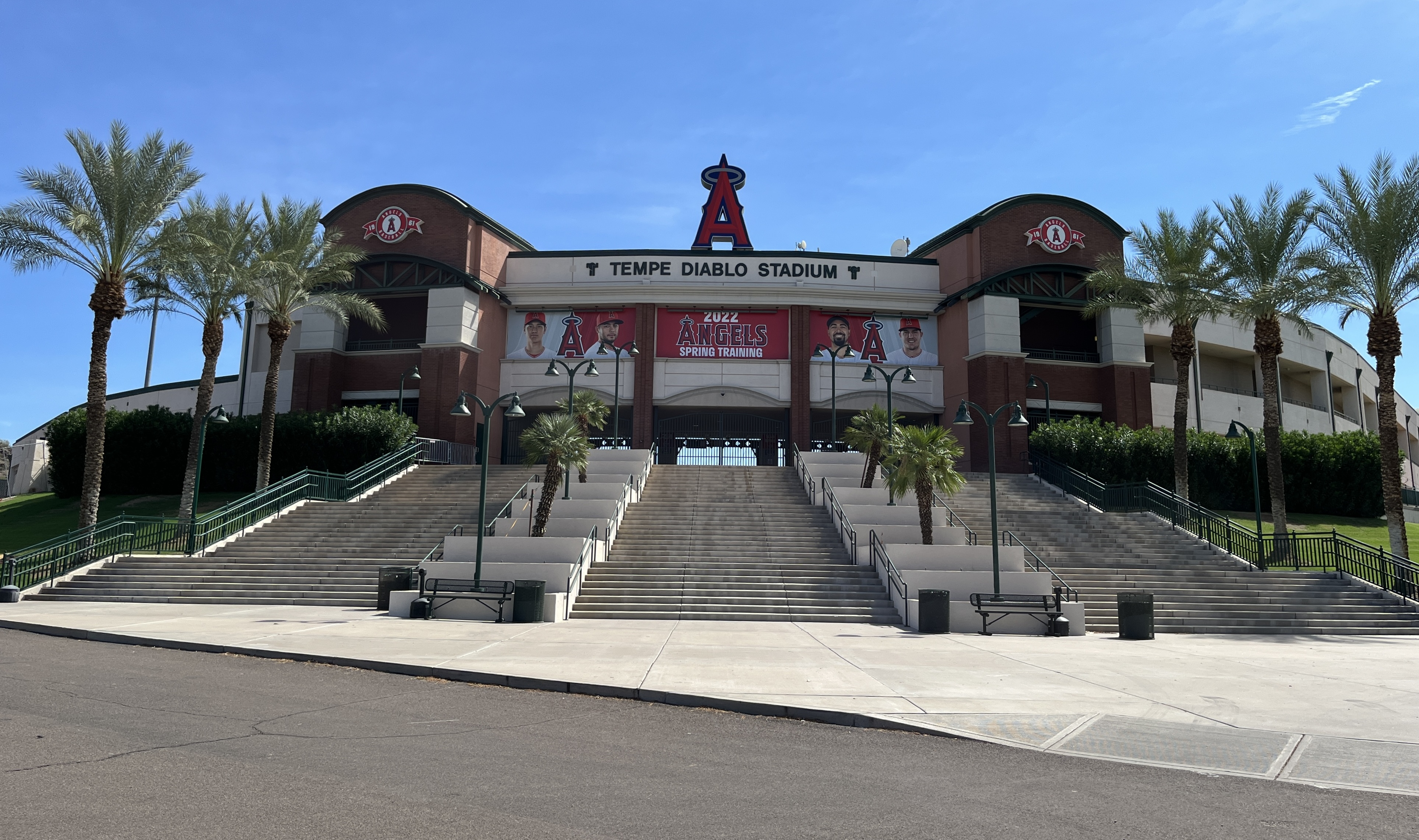
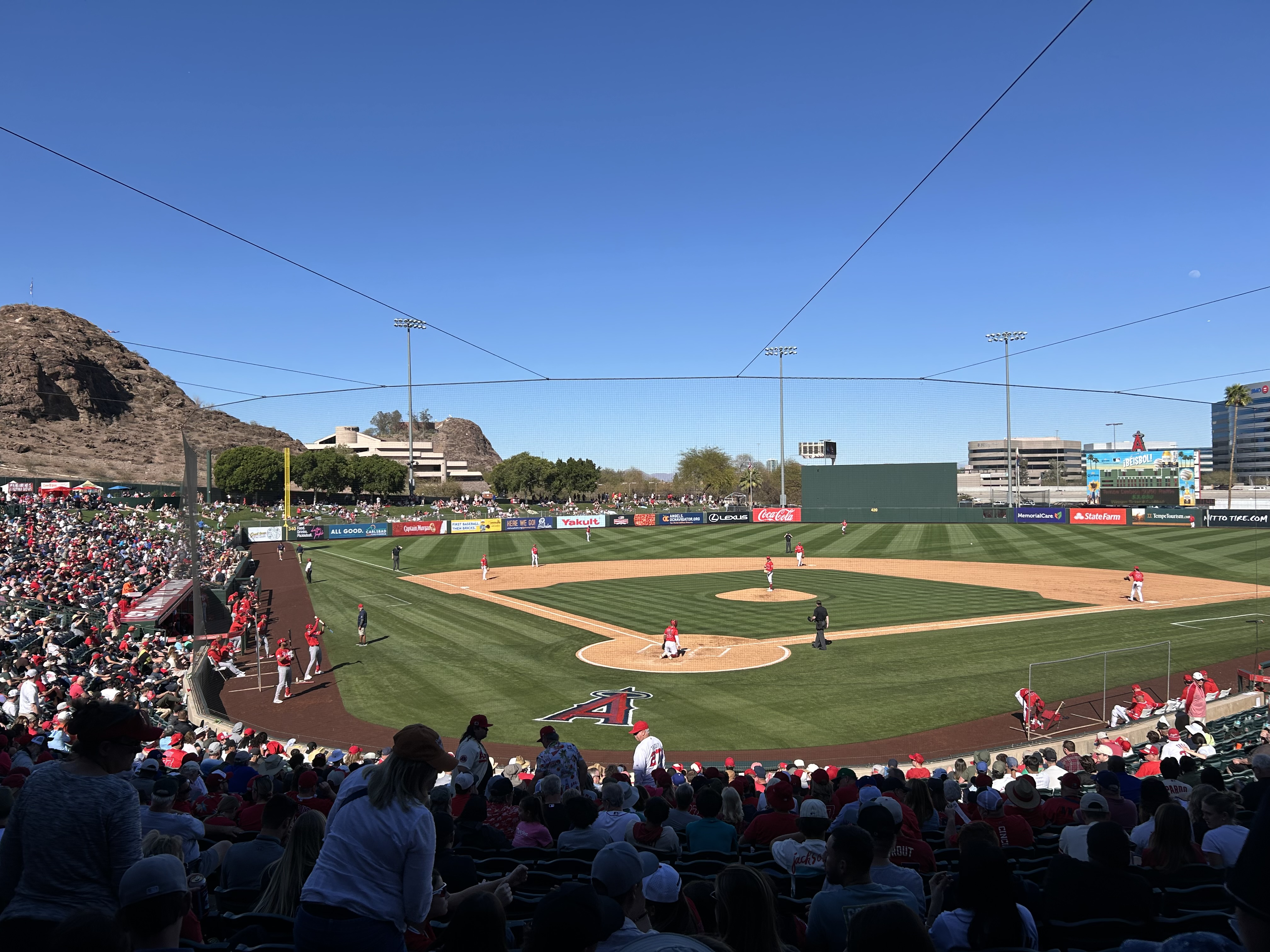
- Interactive map of Tempe Diablo Stadium
- Address: 2200 W. Alameda Drive
- Location: Tempe, Arizona
- Coordinates: 33°24′2″N 111°58′11″W
- Elevation: 1,160 feet (350 m) AMSL
- Capacity: 9,558
- Surface: Natural grass
- Field size: Left field: 340 ft (104 m); Center field: 420 ft (128 m); Right field: 360 ft (110 m)

Construction
- Opened: 1968; 58 years ago
- Renovated: 2002
- Architect: Populous (1993)

Tenants
- Seattle Pilots (MLB) (1969–1970); Milwaukee Brewers (MLB) (1971–1972); Seattle Mariners (MLB) (1977–1992); Los Angeles Angels (MLB) (1993–present); Tempe Rafters (AFL) (1993–1996)

Tempe Diablo Stadium is a baseball park in the southwestern United States, located in Tempe, Arizona. It has been the spring training home of the Los Angeles Angels since 1993, and it is the home field for night games of the Arizona League Angels.

== History ==
It was the spring training home of the Seattle Pilots in 1969 and 1970 (the Pilots moved to Milwaukee late in spring training, just days prior to the 1970 regular season), the Milwaukee Brewers in 1971 and 1972, and the Seattle Mariners from 1977 through 1992.

The stadium was built in 1968 and has a seating capacity of 9,558, making it the oldest and smallest ballpark in the Cactus League. It underwent an extensive $20 million renovation from 2002 until 2006 and was rededicated on March 3, 2006. The renovation included the main stadium, the major league fields, and the Minor league complex on site. The Arizona Sports and Tourism Authority, a municipal corporation charged with funding renovations of Cactus League stadiums throughout Maricopa County, funded $12 million of the renovations.

The Angels and the city government announced an agreement in May 2021 to keep the team's spring training in Tempe through at least 2035. The deal includes extensive renovations of the stadium and the surrounding complex, including a new home clubhouse, team offices, a team store and an outfield concourse.

Tempe Diablo Stadium can be seen from the Maricopa Freeway. A small desert butte looms down the left field foul line.

The stadium is also the site for the state of Arizona's high school baseball playoffs.
