= State Farm Stadium =

Stadium in Glendale, Arizona

- "The Mothership"

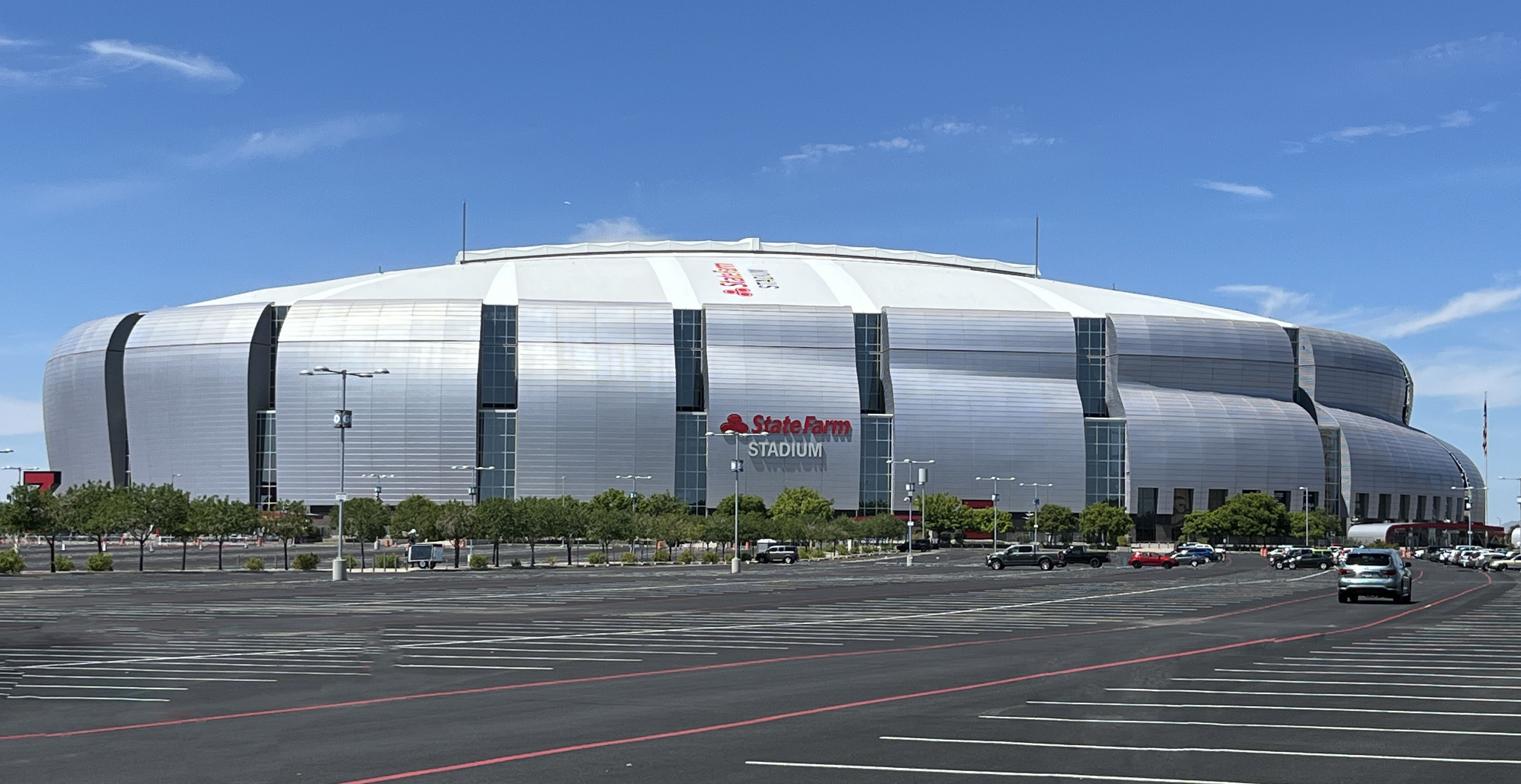
- View from east in 2022

- Location in the United States Location in Arizona
- Former names: Cardinals Stadium (August–September 2006); University of Phoenix Stadium (2006–2018)
- Address: 1 Cardinals Drive
- Location: Glendale, Arizona, U.S.
- Coordinates: 33.528°N 112.263°W
- Elevation: 1,060 feet (320 m) AMSL
- Owner: Arizona Sports and Tourism Authority
- Operator: Legends Global
- Capacity: 63,400 (expandable to 72,200; standing room to 78,600)
- Executive suites: 89
- Roof: Retractable
- Surface: Natural grass: Tifway 419 Hybrid Bermuda
- Parking: 14,000 spots

Construction
- Groundbreaking: April 12, 2003
- Opened: August 1, 2006; 20 years ago
- Renovated: 2014, 2017
- Cost: $455 million ($727 million in 2025 dollars)
- Architects: Eisenman Architects, Populous (then HOK Sport)
- Structural engineers: Bowl: TLCP Structural, Inc. , Roof: Walter P Moore
- Services engineers: M-E Engineers, Inc.
- General contractor: Hunt Construction Group

Tenants
- Arizona Cardinals (NFL) 2006–present Fiesta Bowl (NCAA) 2007–present San Francisco 49ers (National Football League) (2020)

Website
- statefarmstadium.com

State Farm Stadium is a retractable roof stadium in Glendale, Arizona, U.S., a suburb west of Phoenix. It is the home of the Arizona Cardinals of the National Football League (NFL) and the annual Fiesta Bowl. Opened in 2006, the venue replaced Sun Devil Stadium in Tempe as the home of the Cardinals, and is adjacent to Desert Diamond Arena, former home of the Arizona Coyotes of the National Hockey League.

The stadium has been the host of the Fiesta Bowl since January 2007. It hosted two BCS National Championship games in 2007 and 2011, respectively. It hosted the College Football Playoff National Championship in 2016, three Super Bowls (2008, 2015, and 2023), as well as the Pro Bowl in 2015. It also hosted the final game of the 2025 NFL Wild Card weekend for the Los Angeles Rams against the Minnesota Vikings due to the Southern California Wildfires going on at the time. For soccer, it was one of the stadiums for the 2015 CONCACAF Gold Cup also the first semi-final of the 2019 CONCACAF Gold Cup, the Copa América Centenario in 2016 and the 2024 Copa América in 2024. For basketball, it hosted the NCAA Men's Final Four in 2017 and 2024. The stadium also held the memorial service of Charlie Kirk following his assassination in 2025.

The stadium opened in 2006 as Cardinals Stadium. Later that year in September, the University of Phoenix acquired naming rights, renaming it University of Phoenix Stadium, in what was then a 20-year agreement. It was renamed in September 2018 for insurance company State Farm, which has an 18-year naming rights deal.

== History ==
Since moving to Arizona from St. Louis in 1988, the Cardinals had played at Sun Devil Stadium on the campus of Arizona State University in Tempe. The Cardinals planned to play there for only a few years, until a new stadium could be built in Phoenix. The savings and loan crisis derailed funding for a new stadium during the 1990s. Over time, the Cardinals expressed frustration at being merely tenants in a college football stadium. The lack of having their own stadium denied them additional revenue streams available to other NFL teams. The Cardinals campaigned several times in the years prior to its construction for a new and more modern facility.

In 2000 and 2001 as the Cardinals began exploring places to build their new stadium, numerous cities began to bid for it. The Arizona Tourism and Sports Authority oversaw construction of the stadium and were responsible for finding the stadium's location. Tempe and Avondale were front runners, with other sites in downtown Phoenix, the Fort McDowell Indian Reservation, and near Fountain Hills also being considered. The Tempe site would be close to the Cardinals’ training facility but would cost the authority $30,000 monthly in water expenses. The Avondale land would be a donation by developer John F. Long, who would also assume the risk for the $26 million infrastructure cost. By 2002, Mesa and Glendale had also submitted bids and taken over as top choices. Ultimately, Mesa residents would vote to not approve the building of the stadium and Glendale was with its promised $36 million in infrastructure improvements and 11,000 parking spots near the stadium.

The ceremonial groundbreaking for the new stadium in 2003 was held on April 12, and after three years of construction, the 63,400-seat venue opened on August 1, 2006. It was designed by Eisenman Architects and HOK Sport (now Populous). The stadium is considered an architectural icon for the region and was named by Business Week as one of the ten “most impressive” sports facilities on the globe due to the combination of its retractable roof (engineering design by Walter P Moore) and roll-in natural grass field, similar to the GelreDome and the Veltins-Arena.

LED video and ribbon displays from Daktronics in Brookings, South Dakota were installed in 2006 prior to Arizona's first game of the season at the new stadium.

The cost of the project was $455 million, which included $395.4 million for the stadium, $41.7 million for site improvements, and $17.8 million for the land. Contributors to the stadium included the Arizona Sports and Tourism Authority ($302.3 million), the Arizona Cardinals ($143.2 million), and the City of Glendale ($9.5 million).

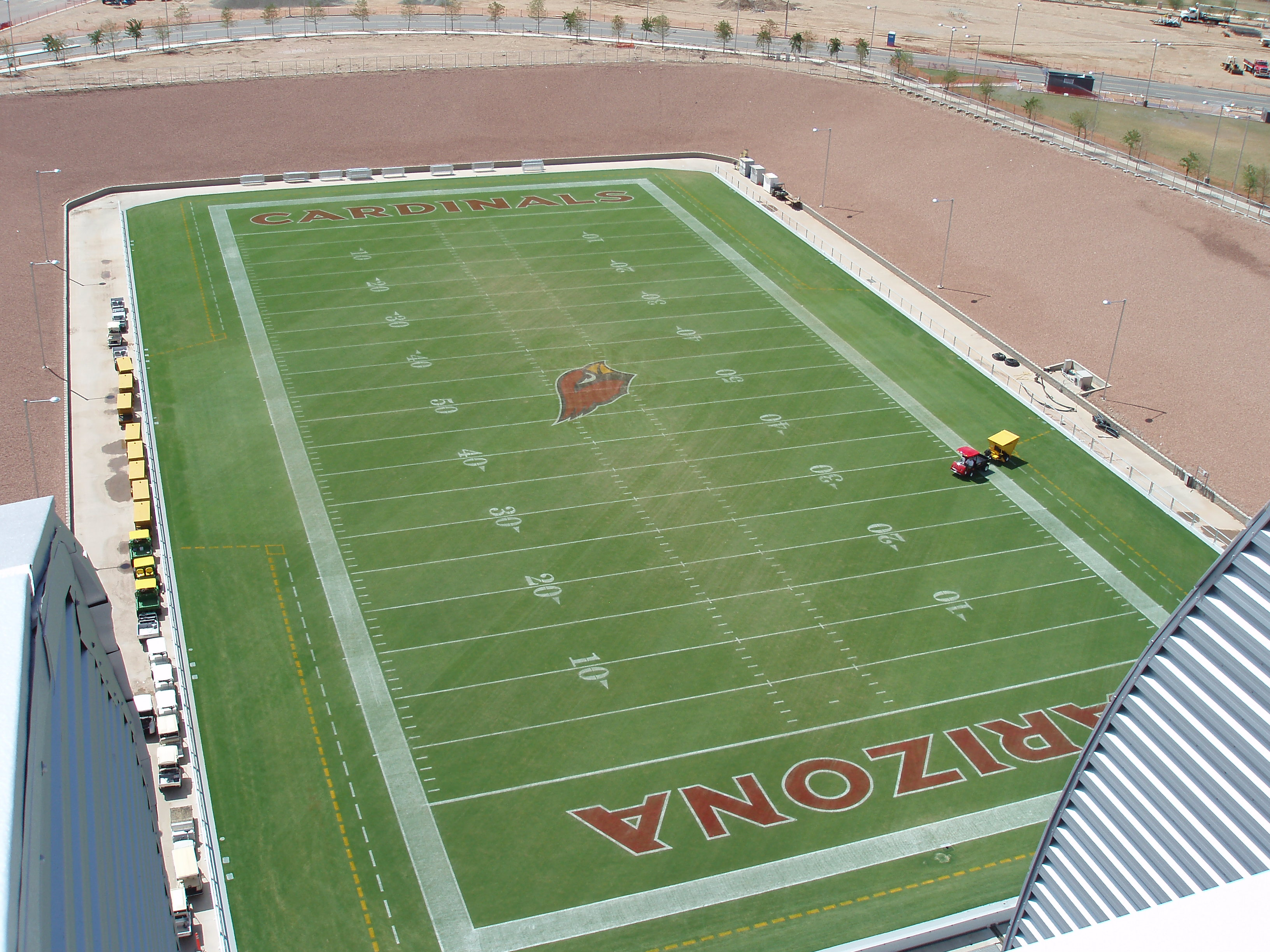
The playing field outside and lined for the Arizona Cardinals

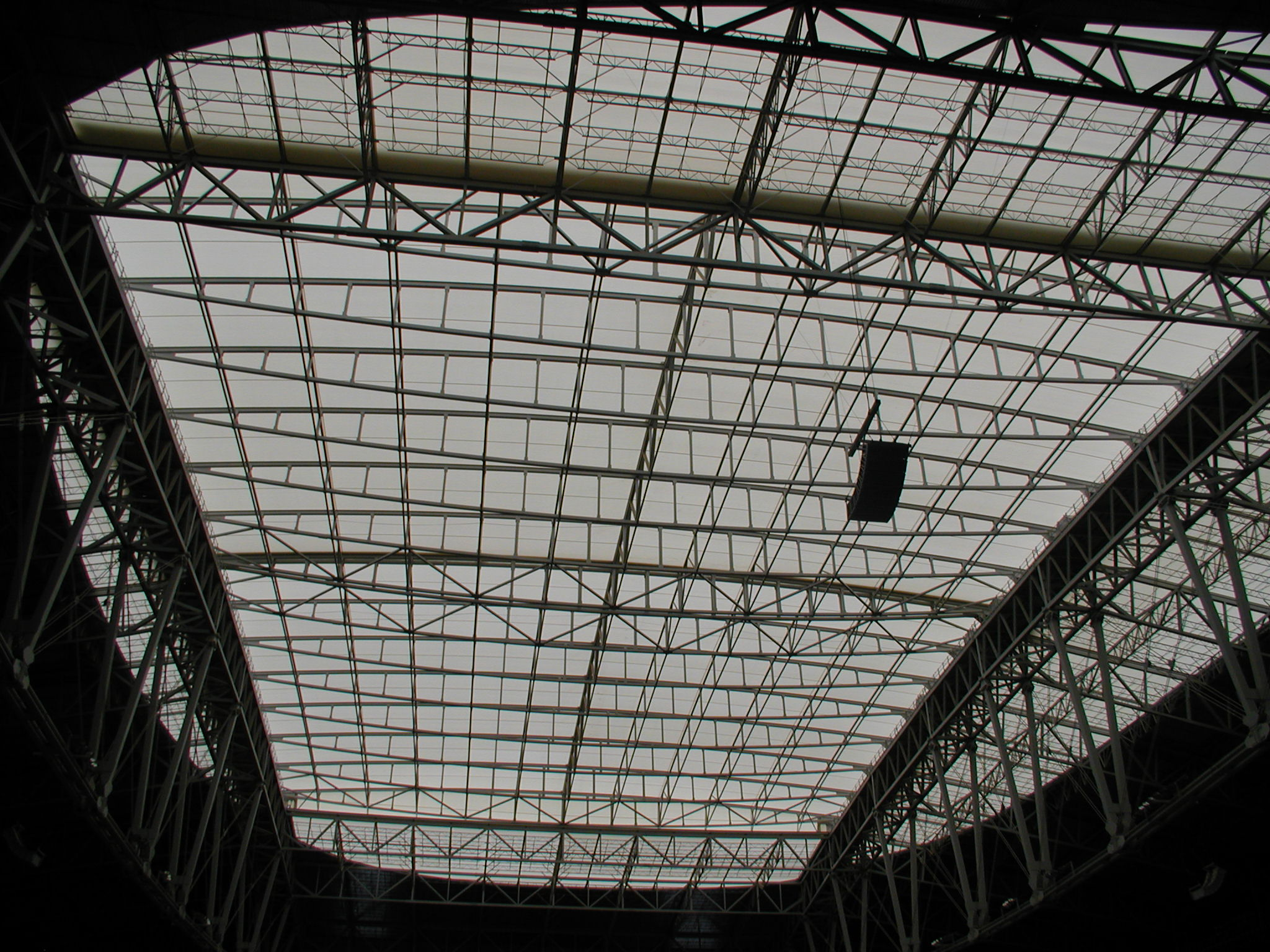
Stadium roof in 2007

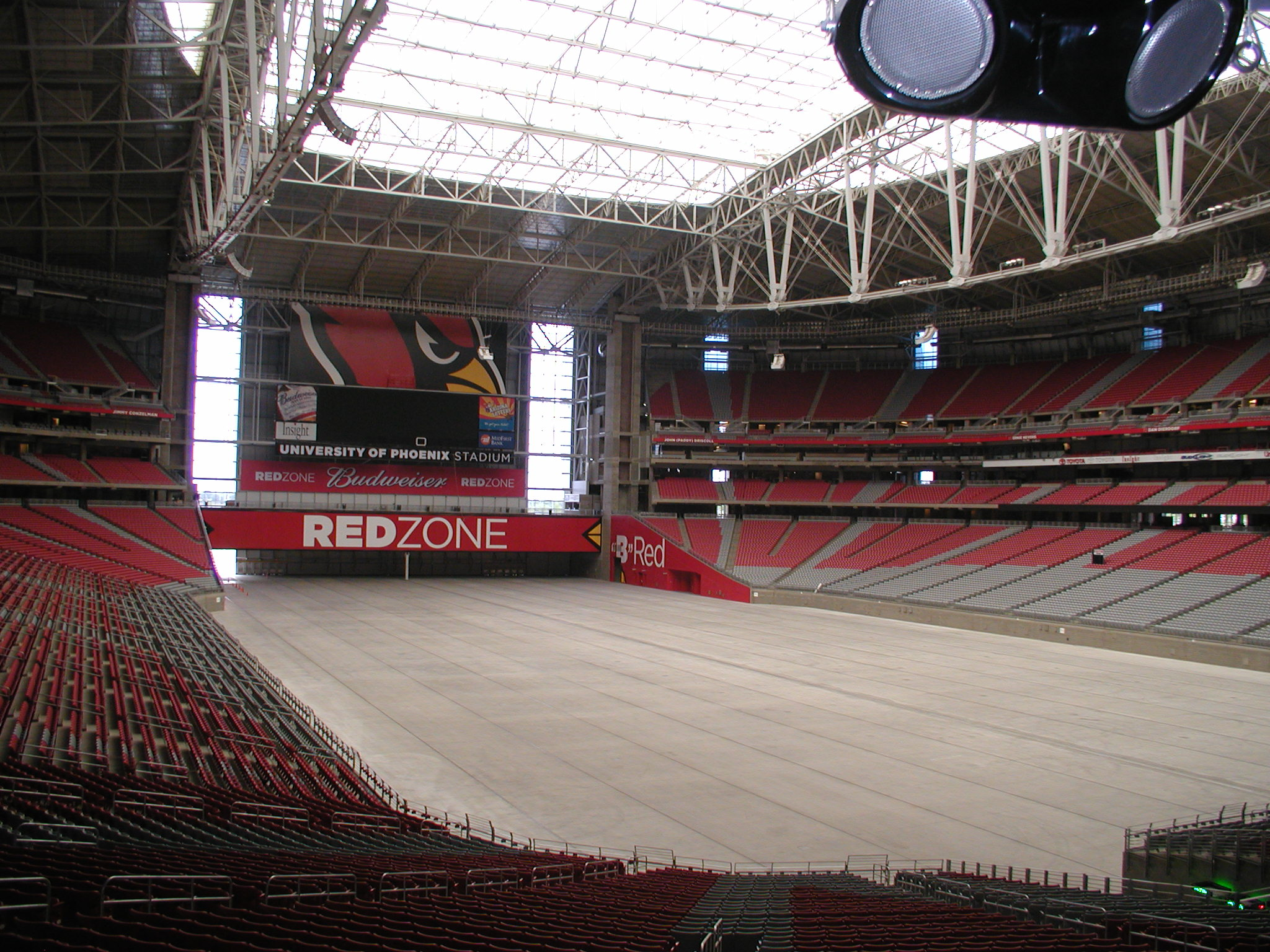
The interior with field removed. To protect the stadium's grass playing surface and to provide a flat floor for solid footing, non-football events are always held with the facility in this configuration.

The stadium has 88 luxury suites – called luxury lofts – with space for 16 future suites as the stadium matures.

The 25 acres (10 ha) surrounding the stadium is called Sportsman's Park (the team had previously played in a venue of the same name in St. Louis from 1960 to 1965). Included within the Park is an 8-acre (3.2 ha) landscaped tailgating area called the Great Lawn. The approximate elevation at field level is 1,070 feet (330 m) above sea level.

The stadium seating capacity can be expanded by 8,800 for "mega-events" such as college bowls, NFL Super Bowls, the NFC Championship Game, and the Final Four by adding risers and ganged, portable "X-frame" folding seats. The end zone area on the side of the facility where the field tray rolls in and out of the facility can be expanded to accommodate an additional tier of seating which slopes down from the scoreboard level.

The roof is made out of translucent Birdair fabric and opens in 12 minutes. It is the first retractable roof ever built on an incline.

In 2024, the Cardinals announced renovations to add two luxury clubs to both endzones: Casitas Garden Club on the South end and Morgan Athletic Club on the North end. New tunnel seats and field seats will also be added.

== Events ==
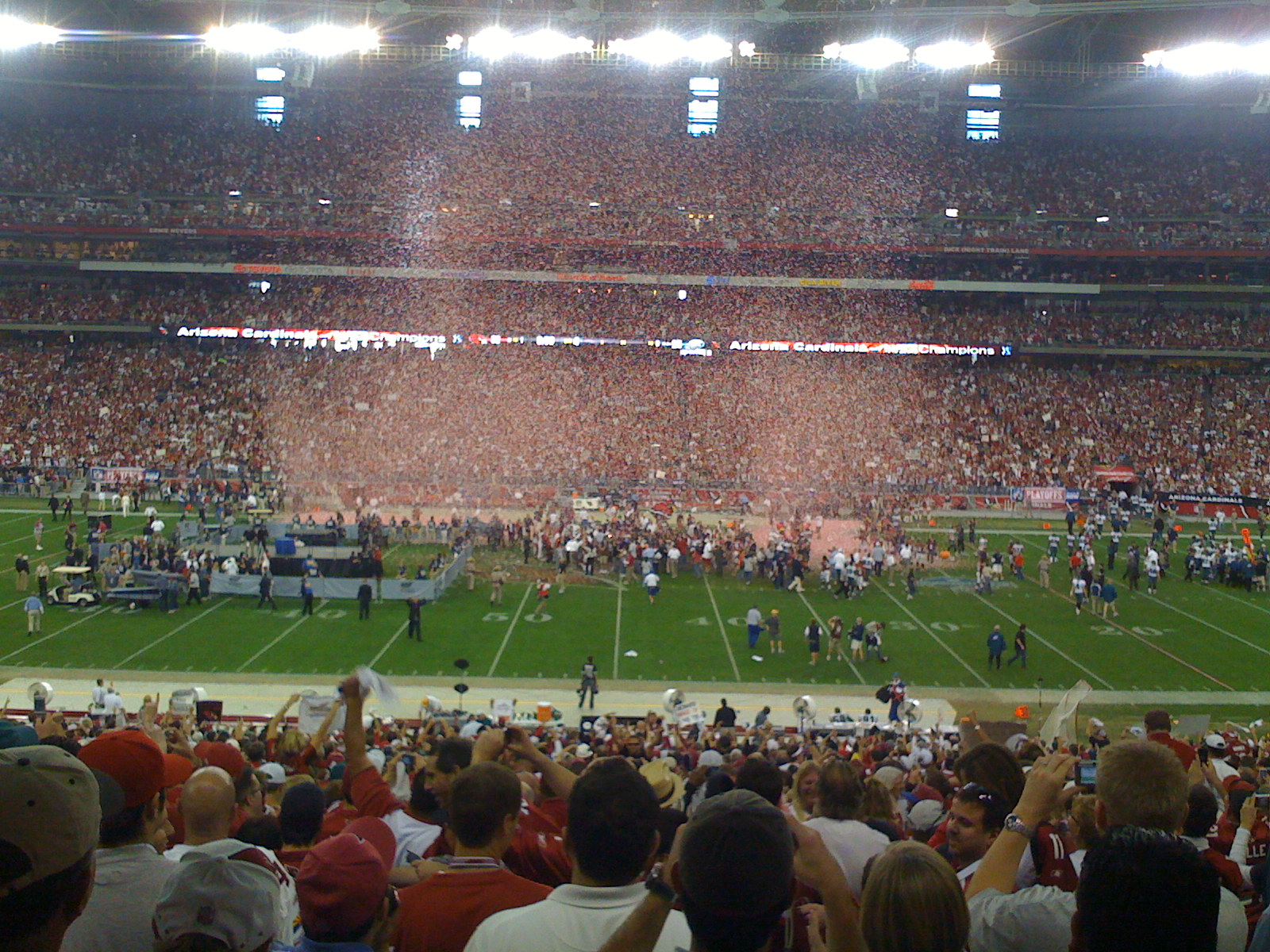
Cardinals win NFC Championship, January 18, 2009

Events held at the stadium include Arizona Cardinals home games; public grand opening tours held August 19–20, 2006 (attended by 120,000 people); various shows, expositions, tradeshows and motor sport events; and international soccer exhibition matches.

The multipurpose nature of the facility has allowed it to host 91 events representing 110 event days between August 4, 2006, through the BCS National Championship January 8, 2007.

=== NFL ===
The first preseason football game was played August 12, 2006, when the Cardinals defeated the Pittsburgh Steelers, 21–13. The first regular season game was played September 10 against the San Francisco 49ers (the Cardinals won 34–27). The stadium's air-conditioning system made it possible for the Cardinals to play at home on the opening weekend of the NFL season for the first time since moving to Arizona in 1988.

On October 16, 2006, the stadium hosted a notable game between the Cardinals and the undefeated Chicago Bears where the Bears came back from a 20-point deficit to defeat the Cardinals. The Bears would later go on to play in Super Bowl XLI.

University of Phoenix Stadium hosted Super Bowl XLII on February 3, 2008, in which the New York Giants defeated the previously undefeated New England Patriots 17–14 with a paid attendance crowd of 71,101. This was the second time the Phoenix area hosted a Super Bowl, the other being Super Bowl XXX held in nearby Tempe at Sun Devil Stadium in 1996 when the Dallas Cowboys defeated the Pittsburgh Steelers 27–17.

The Cardinals' first home playoff game since 1947 took place at the stadium on January 3, 2009, with Arizona beating the Atlanta Falcons, 30–24. The stadium also hosted the 2008 NFC Championship Game between the Cardinals and Philadelphia Eagles on January 18, 2009, which the Cardinals won 32–25 in front of over 70,000 fans in attendance and advanced to Super Bowl XLIII.

The 2015 Pro Bowl was the first Pro Bowl to be held at the same location as the same year's Super Bowl since 2010. The Pro Bowl returned to Hawaii in 2016. On February 1, 2015, the New England Patriots defeated the Seattle Seahawks 28–24 in Super Bowl XLIX held at the stadium.

On November 30, 2020, it was announced that because of Santa Clara County's new COVID-19 rules barring contact sports, the 49ers could not play at their home Levi's Stadium; they were subsequently forced to play their final three home games against the Buffalo Bills, the Washington Football Team, and the Seattle Seahawks at State Farm Stadium. Including a road game against the Cardinals, the 49ers played four of their final five games at State Farm Stadium to end the season.

Super Bowl LVII was held at the stadium on February 12, 2023. The Kansas City Chiefs defeated the Philadelphia Eagles in a high-scoring affair, 38–35.

The stadium hosted a home Monday night wild card game on January 13, 2025, for the Los Angeles Rams against the Minnesota Vikings in lieu of SoFi Stadium in Inglewood, California, due to the ongoing impact of the January 2025 Southern California wildfires.

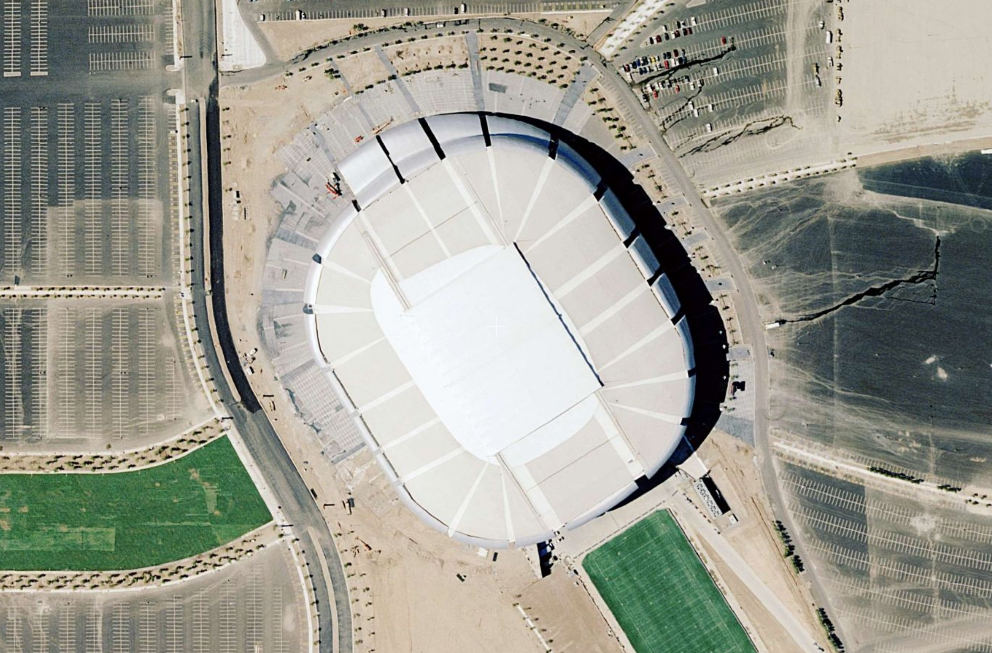
Aerial view of the stadium in 2007

Super Bowls

- Note: Winning team in **Bold**

Super Bowl	NFC Team	AFC Team	Score	Halftime Show	Attendance
Super Bowl XLII	**New York Giants**	New England Patriots	17–14	Tom Petty and the Heartbreakers	71,101
Super Bowl XLIX	Seattle Seahawks	**New England Patriots**	28–24	Katy Perry featuring Lenny Kravitz, Missy Elliott, Arizona State University; Sun Devil Marching Band	70,288
Super Bowl LVII	Philadelphia Eagles	**Kansas City Chiefs**	38–35	Rihanna	67,827

=== College football ===
The stadium was the new venue for the Fiesta Bowl since 2007, replacing Sun Devil Stadium. The first Fiesta Bowl at the stadium was held on January 1, 2007, featuring the Boise State Broncos vs. the University of Oklahoma Sooners, with Boise State winning 43–42 in overtime. It also hosted the BCS National Championship on January 8, 2007, between the (1) Ohio State Buckeyes and the (2) University of Florida Gators, which the Gators won 41–14.

On January 10, 2011, the stadium hosted the 2011 BCS National Championship Game between the Auburn Tigers and the Oregon Ducks, which had an attendance record setting 78,603 on hand for the game.

On January 11, 2016, University of Phoenix Stadium hosted the College Football Playoff National Championship Game featuring the No. 2 Alabama Crimson Tide and No. 1 ranked Clemson Tigers.

On December 31, 2022, as part of the College Football Playoff's semifinal games, State Farm Stadium hosted the 2022 Fiesta Bowl, featuring the No. 3 TCU Horned Frogs and No. 2 ranked Michigan Wolverines.

Bowl Game Results

Winning Team	Losing Team	Bowl Game	Score	Attendance
No. 9 Boise State	No. 7 Oklahoma	2007 Fiesta Bowl	43−42 (OT)	73,719
No. 2 Florida	No. 1 Ohio State	2007 BCS National Championship Game	41−14	74,628
No. 11 West Virginia	No. 3 Oklahoma	2008 Fiesta Bowl	48−28	70,016
No.3 Texas	No. 10 Ohio State	2009 Fiesta Bowl	24−21	72,047
No. 6 Boise State	No. 3 TCU	2010 Fiesta Bowl	17−10	73,227
No. 9 Oklahoma	No. 25 UConn	2011 Fiesta Bowl	48−20	67,232
No. 1 Auburn	No. 2 Oregon	2011 BCS National Championship Game	22−19	78,603
No. 3 Oklahoma State	No. 4 Stanford	2012 Fiesta Bowl	41−38 (OT)	69,927
No. 5 Oregon	No. 7 Kansas State	2013 Fiesta Bowl	35−17	70,242
No. 15 UCF	No. 6 Baylor	2014 Fiesta Bowl (January)	52−42	65,172
No. 21 Boise State	No. 12 Arizona	2014 Fiesta Bowl (December)	38−30	66,896
No. 7 Ohio State	No. 8 Notre Dame	2016 Fiesta Bowl (January)	44−28	71,123
No. 2 Alabama	No. 1 Clemson	2016 College Football Playoff National Championship	45−40	75,765
No. 3 Clemson	No. 2 Ohio State	2016 Fiesta Bowl (December) (CFP Semifinal)	31−0	70,236
No. 9 Penn State	No. 12 Washington	2017 Fiesta Bowl	35−28	61,842
No. 11 LSU	No. 7 UCF	2019 Fiesta Bowl (January)	40−32	57,246
No. 3 Clemson	No. 2 Ohio State	2019 Fiesta Bowl (December) (CFP Semifinal)	29−23	71,330
No. 12 Iowa State	No. 25 Oregon	2021 Fiesta Bowl	34−17	0*
No. 9 Oklahoma State	No. 5 Notre Dame	2022 Fiesta Bowl (January)	37−35	49,550
No. 3 TCU	No. 2 Michigan	2022 Fiesta Bowl (December) (CFP Semifinal)	51−45	71,723
No. 8 Oregon	No. 18 Liberty	2024 Fiesta Bowl (January)	45−6	47,769
No. 4 Penn State	No. 9 Boise State	2024 Fiesta Bowl (December)	31−14	63,854
No. 10 Miami (FL)	No. 6 Ole Miss	2026 Fiesta Bowl	31−27	67,928

*Note: The 2021 Fiesta Bowl only allowed family members of both universities due to COVID-19, and, as a result, did not record an official attendance.

=== College basketball ===
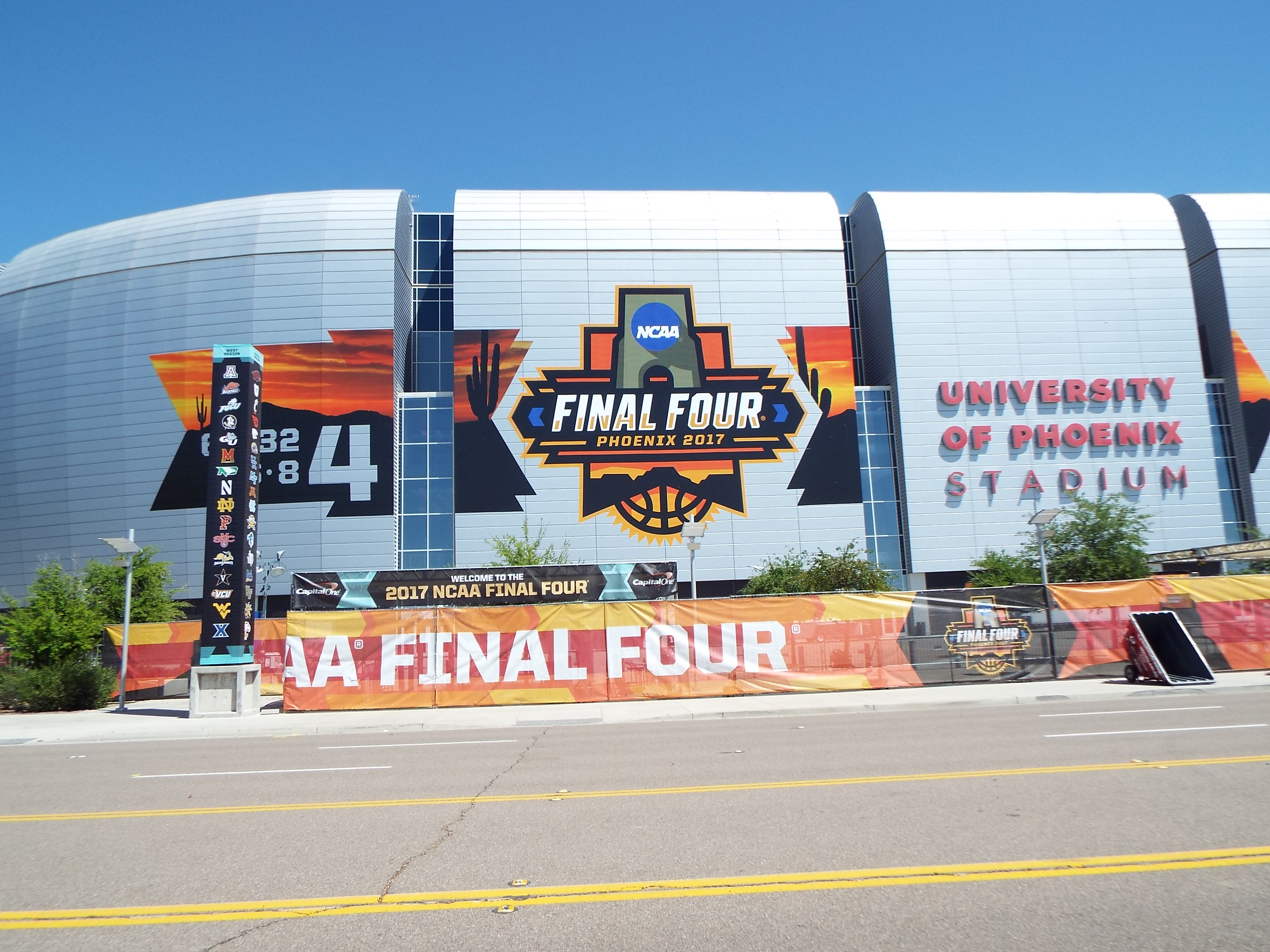
2017 NCAA Final Four

Before 2018, the venue was known as University of Phoenix Stadium. It hosted the Final Four, the semifinals and championship game of the NCAA Division I men's basketball tournament, in 2017. The 2017 Final Four featured South Carolina, Gonzaga, Oregon and North Carolina. Gonzaga defeated South Carolina in the first semifinal game 77–73 and North Carolina defeated Oregon in the second semifinal game 77–76. North Carolina defeated Gonzaga for their 6th national title, 71–65.

The stadium hosted the Final Four of the 2024 NCAA Division I men's basketball tournament. The 2024 Final Four featured UConn, Alabama, NC State and Purdue. Purdue defeated NC State in the first semifinal game 63–50 and UConn defeated Alabama in the second semifinal game 86–72. UConn then defeated Purdue in the championship game 75–60 to become the first team since the 2007 Florida Gators to repeat as national champions.

Additionally, it hosted the West Regional semifinals and finals in 2009.

=== Soccer ===
On February 7, 2007, the stadium hosted a soccer match attended by 62,462 fans. The United States men's national soccer team defeated Mexico, 2–0. On January 21, 2012, the U.S. played against Venezuela and won the match 1–0.

On January 30, 2013, Mexico played against Denmark, a game that was broadcast on Televisa Deportes, UniMás, and TV Azteca. The match ended in a 1–1 draw.

On November 19, 2015, the stadium was one of the sites selected for the 2016 Copa América Centenario. The stadium hosted three matches, including Mexico vs. Uruguay on June 5, and the third-place match (United States vs. Colombia) on June 25.

In club soccer, Real Madrid battled MLS side LA Galaxy in August 2013. The Spanish side defeated the Galaxy 3–1.

The stadium has hosted the CONCACAF Gold Cup and the first semi-final of the 2019 Gold Cup.

Date	Winning Team	Result	Losing Team	Tournament	Attendance
February 7, 2007	**United States**	2–0	Mexico	Men's International Friendly	62,462
July 12, 2009	**Panama**	4–0	Nicaragua	2009 CONCACAF Gold Cup Group C	23,876
July 12, 2009	**Mexico**	2–0	Guadeloupe	2009 CONCACAF Gold Cup Group C	23,876
November 19, 2011	United States	1–1	Sweden	Women's International Friendly	18,482
January 21, 2012	**United States**	1–0	Venezuela	Men's International Friendly	22,403
December 1, 2012	**United States**	2–0	Republic of Ireland	Women's International Friendly	11,570
January 30, 2013	Mexico	1–1	Denmark	Men's International Friendly	43,345
August 1, 2013	**(Spain) Real Madrid**	3–1	(United States) LA Galaxy	2013 International Champions Cup	38,922
April 2, 2014	United States	2–2	Mexico	Men's International Friendly	59,066
July 12, 2015	Guatemala	0–0	Mexico	2015 CONCACAF Gold Cup Group C	62,910
July 12, 2015	**Trinidad and Tobago**	2–0	Cuba	2015 CONCACAF Gold Cup Group C	62,910
December 13, 2015	**United States**	2–0	China	Women's International Friendly	19,066
June 5, 2016	**Mexico**	3–1	Uruguay	Copa América Centenario Group C	60,025
June 8, 2016	Ecuador	2–2	Peru	Copa América Centenario Group B	11,937
June 25, 2016	**Colombia**	1–0	United States	Copa América Centenario third place match	29,041
July 20, 2017	**Jamaica**	2–1	Canada	2017 CONCACAF Gold Cup quarter-finals	37,404
July 20, 2017	**Mexico**	1–0	Honduras	2017 CONCACAF Gold Cup quarter-finals	37,404
July 19, 2018	(England) Manchester United	1–1	(Mexico) América	Club Friendly	37,660
January 27, 2019	**United States**	3–0	Panama	Men's International Friendly	9,040
July 2, 2019	**Mexico**	1–0	Haiti	2019 CONCACAF Gold Cup semi-finals	62,363
July 24, 2021	**Qatar**	3–2	El Salvador	2021 CONCACAF Gold Cup quarter-finals	64,211
July 24, 2021	**Mexico**	3–0	Honduras	2021 CONCACAF Gold Cup quarter-finals	64,211
June 2, 2022	**Uruguay**	3–0	Mexico	Men's International Friendly	57,735
April 19, 2023	United States	1–1	Mexico	Men's International Friendly	55,730
June 29, 2023	Qatar	1–1	Honduras	2023 CONCACAF Gold Cup Group B	34,517
June 29, 2023	**Mexico**	3–1	Haiti	2023 CONCACAF Gold Cup Group B	34,517
June 28, 2024	**Colombia**	3–0	Costa Rica	2024 Copa América Group D	27,386
June 30, 2024	Mexico	0–0	Ecuador	2024 Copa América Group B	62,565
July 6, 2024	**Colombia**	5–0	Panama	2024 Copa América quarterfinals	39,740
February 23, 2025	**Japan**	4–1	Colombia	2025 SheBelieves Cup	12,624
February 23, 2025	**United States**	2–1	Australia	2025 SheBelieves Cup	23,503
June 28, 2025	**Honduras**	1–1 (5–4 pen.)	Panama	2025 CONCACAF Gold Cup quarterfinals	45,255
June 28, 2025	**Mexico**	2–0	Saudi Arabia	2025 CONCACAF Gold Cup quarterfinals	45,255
October 3, 2026	**United States**	3–0	Mexico	Men's International Friendly	64,932

=== Professional wrestling ===
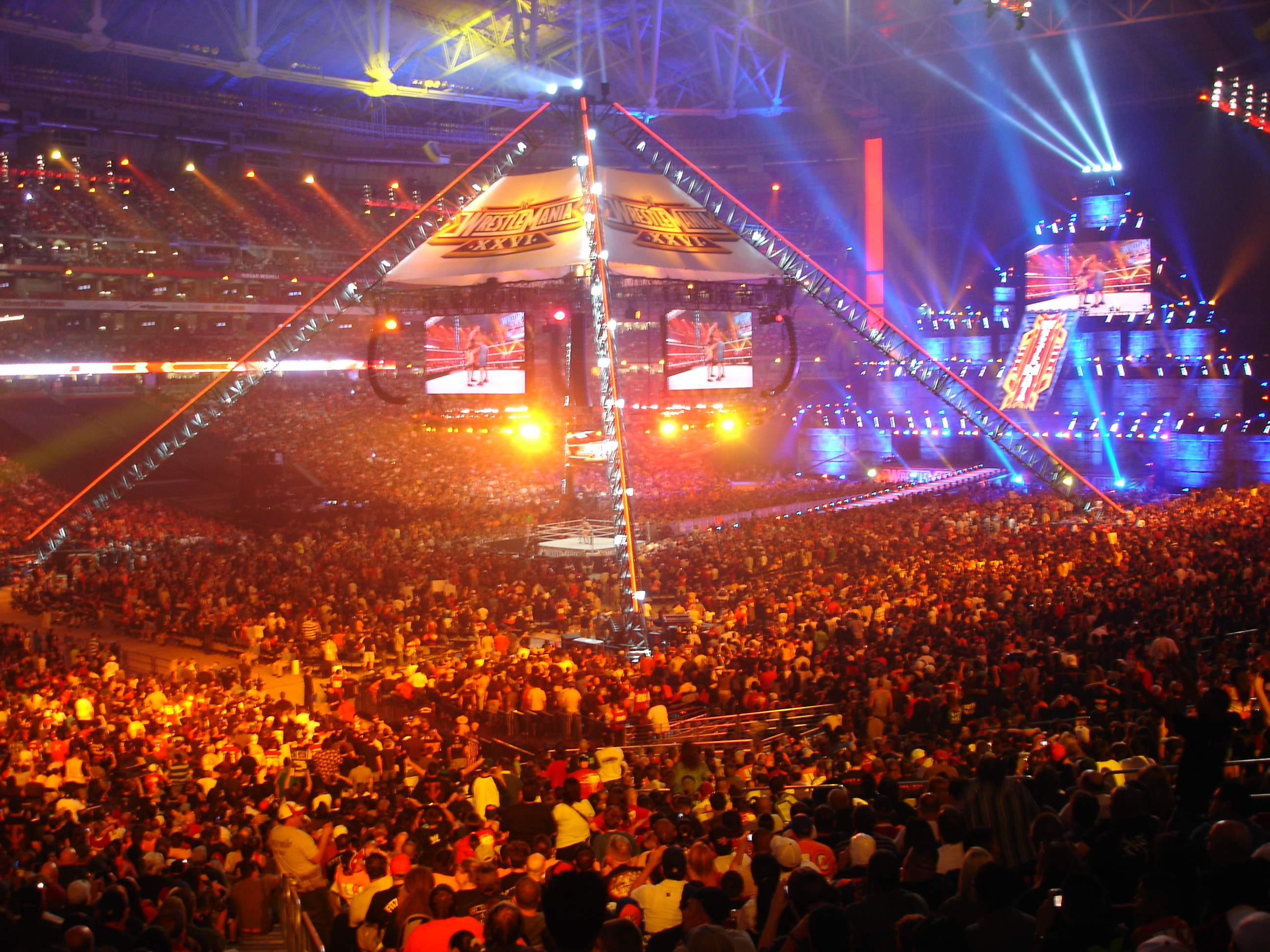
An attendance record setting 72,219 fans at the State Farm Stadium for WrestleMania XXVI

The stadium hosted the WWE professional wrestling event WrestleMania XXVI which took place on March 28, 2010, with 72,219 fans in attendance. This was the first WrestleMania since WrestleMania XI with a non-title match as a main event, the first WrestleMania to be held in the state of Arizona and the third to be held in an open-air venue, after WrestleMania IX and WrestleMania XXIV. The event grossed $5.8 million in ticket sales, making the event the highest grossing and attended entertainment event held at the University of Phoenix Stadium.

In 2027, the stadium will host WWE’s Royal Rumble event for the first time.

=== Concerts ===
Date	Artist	Opening act(s)	Event	Attendance	Revenue	Notes
November 8, 2006	Rolling Stones	Alice Cooper	A Bigger Bang Tour	41,772 / 41,772	$3,286,121	
May 31, 2008	Kenny Chesney	Keith Urban; Gary Allan; Sammy Hagar	Poets and Pirates Tour	40,098 / 47,132	$3,151,970	
October 20, 2009	U2	The Black Eyed Peas	U2 360° Tour	50,775 / 50,775	$4,912,050	
September 16, 2014	One Direction	5 Seconds of Summer	Where We Are Tour	56,524 / 56,524	$5,035,880	
August 15, 2016	Guns N' Roses	Zakk Wylde; Tyler Bryant & The Shakedown	Not in This Lifetime... Tour	44,110 / 48,914	$4,257,189	
August 4, 2017	Metallica	Avenged Sevenfold; Gojira	WorldWired Tour	52,926 / 52,926	$5,246,586	
September 19, 2017	U2	Beck	The Joshua Tree Tour 2017	42,814 / 42,814	$4,169,215	
May 8, 2018	Taylor Swift	Camila Cabello; Charli XCX	Reputation Stadium Tour	59,157 / 59,157	$7,214,478	Before the tour began, Swift invited 2,000 foster and adopted children to a private dress rehearsal.
September 19, 2018	Beyoncé; Jay-Z	Chloe x Halle; DJ Khaled	On the Run II Tour	37,174 / 37,174	$4,426,568	
March 23, 2019	Garth Brooks	Easton Corbin	The Garth Brooks Stadium Tour	77,653 / 77,653	$6,499,556	This was the highest-attended indoor concert in Arizona history.
August 26, 2019	The Rolling Stones	Kaleo	No Filter Tour	52,726 / 52,726	$9,747,170	This concert was originally scheduled to take place on May 7, 2019, but was postponed due to Mick Jagger recovering from a heart procedure.
May 12, 2022	Coldplay	H.E.R. Kacy Hill	Music of the Spheres World Tour	42,849 / 42,849	$3,542,528	Originally scheduled for May 3, 2022, but rescheduled for logistical reasons.
August 25, 2022	Mötley Crüe; Def Leppard	Poison; Joan Jett and the Blackhearts; Classless Act	The Stadium Tour	45,131 / 45,131	$6,379,829	
August 30, 2022	The Weeknd	Kaytranada; Mike Dean	After Hours til Dawn Tour	53,969 / 53,969	$6,200,909	
March 17–18, 2023	Taylor Swift	Paramore; Gayle	The Eras Tour		—	This is the first act in the stadium's history to sell out two shows on a single tour. Glendale symbolically renamed itself to "Swift City" to honor the fact that the stadium kicked off the tour.
May 6, 2023	George Strait	Chris Stapleton; Little Big Town		57,843	$16,300,000	
May 14, 2023	Red Hot Chili Peppers	The Strokes; Thundercat	The Global Stadium Tour	—	—	
August 24, 2023	Beyoncé		Renaissance World Tour	54,705 / 54,705	$8,226,165	The show experienced technical issues that led the show to be paused for approximately 10 minutes. After 10 minutes, Beyoncé came back on stage with a new outfit, picking up where the song left off.
September 1, 2023	Metallica	Pantera; Mammoth WVH	M72 World Tour	133,060 / 133,060	$14,013,497	No repeat weekend. 2 different nights, 2 different sets, 2 different opening acts.
September 9, 2023	Metallica	Five Finger Death Punch; Suicidal Tendencies	M72 World Tour	133,060 / 133,060	$14,013,497	No repeat weekend. 2 different nights, 2 different sets, 2 different opening acts.
May 7, 2024	The Rolling Stones	Carín León; Electric Mud	Hackney Diamonds Tour			
May 31, 2024	Luke Combs		Growin’ Up And Gettin’ Old Tour			
June 1, 2024	Luke Combs		Growin’ Up And Gettin’ Old Tour			
May 9, 2025	The Weeknd	Playboi Carti; Mike Dean	After Hours til Dawn Tour			
May 27, 2025	Kendrick Lamar; SZA	Mustard	Grand National Tour			
June 21, 2025	Post Malone	Jelly Roll	Big Ass Stadium Tour			
July 18–19, 2025	Morgan Wallen	Ella Langley; Miranda Lambert; Brooks & Dunn	I'm the Problem Tour			
April 14, 2026	Bruno Mars	DJ Pee .Wee; Leon Thomas	The Romantic Tour			
April 15, 2026	Bruno Mars	DJ Pee .Wee; Leon Thomas	The Romantic Tour			
June 13, 2026	Ed Sheeran	Amble; Aaron Rowe	Loop Tour			
August 29, 2026	Karol G		Viajando Por El Mundo Tropitour			
September 5, 2026	Zach Bryan	MJ Lenderman	With Heaven On Tour			
September 29, 2026	Usher; Chris Brown		The R&B Tour			
November 21, 2026	Kanye West		Ye Live Concert Tour			
April 2-3, 2027	Harry Styles	Tinashe	Together, Together			

=== Other events ===
The stadium has also hosted other events, including the Fiesta Bowl National Band Championship High School Marching Band competition and several high school graduations. Twice a year, the stadium also hosts the Maricopa County Home Shows which draws over 40,000 attendees to the stadium shows.

On August 1, 2009, the stadium hosted Monster Jam Summer Heat, with Maximum Destruction defeating Captain's Curse in the racing finals and Grave Digger winning the freestyle event.

The stadium hosted the inaugural Stadium Super Trucks race on April 6, 2013.

On January 30, 2016, Monster Jam returned to the stadium for the first time since 2009, with 16 of the best trucks. On February 6, the AMA Supercross Championship raced for the first time, after visiting Chase Field from 1999 to 2015.

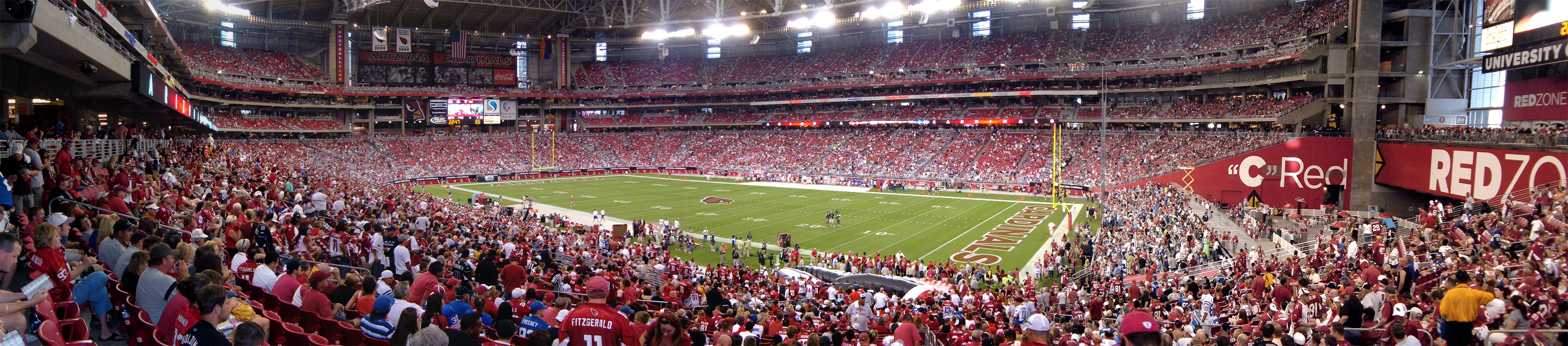
A panoramic view of the interior of the stadium before a Cardinals football game, September 27, 2009

Video of US president Joe Biden and Vice President Kamala Harris virtually touring the vaccination center at the stadium on February 8

On February 10, 2019, Russell M. Nelson, president of the Church of Jesus Christ of Latter-day Saints, spoke to an audience of 68,000, a capacity larger than many events due to the majority of the field space being filled with seats.

On January 11, 2021, the stadium began to be used for administering COVID-19 vaccines 24/7, averaging 7,000 vaccinations per day with the assistance of 500 volunteers.

On September 21, 2025, the funeral for Charlie Kirk was held in the stadium following his assassination eleven days prior. The stadium was filled to its maximum capacity of 73,000 people.

== Naming rights ==
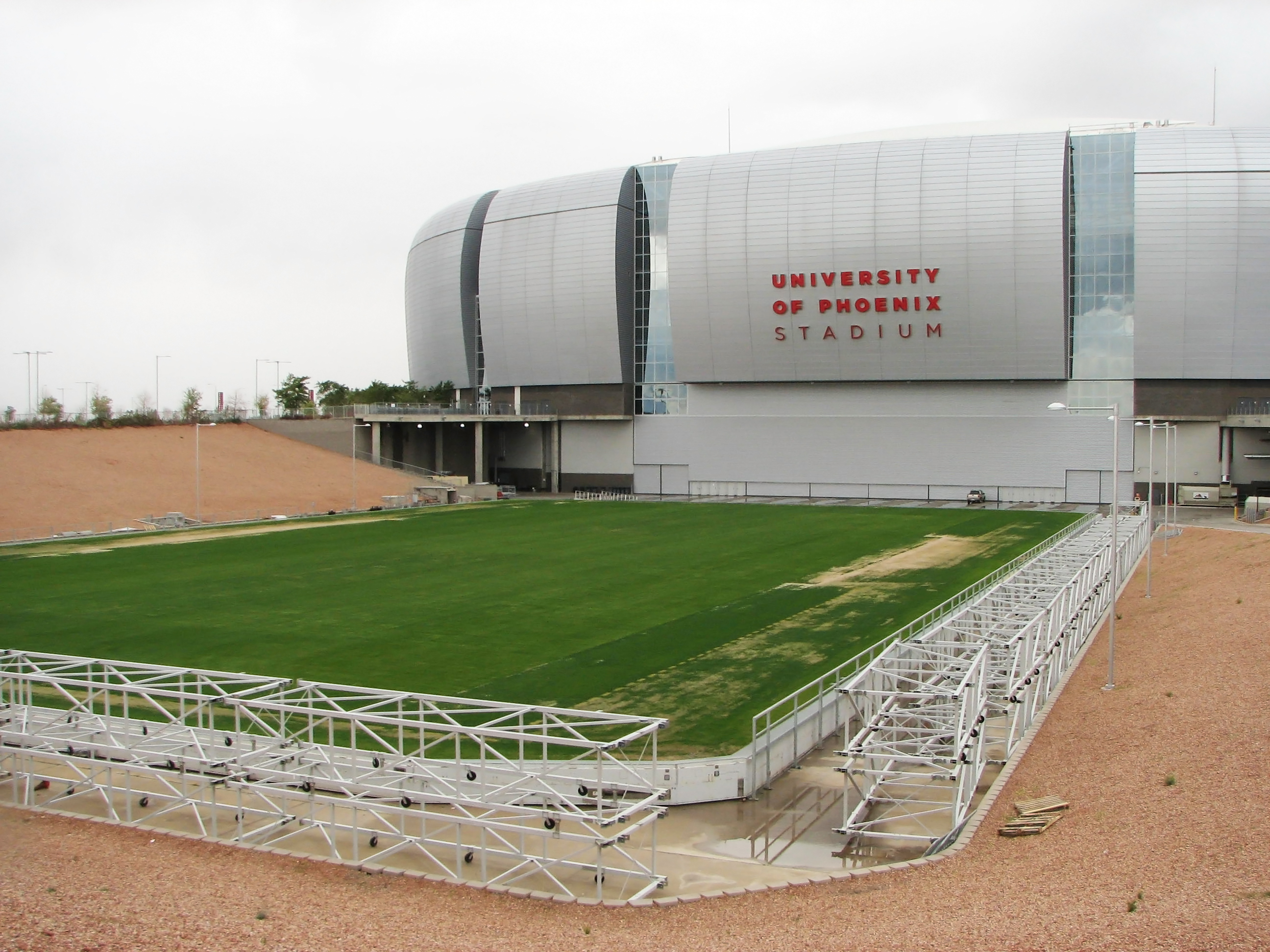
The movable field outside of the stadium

On September 26, 2006, the University of Phoenix acquired the naming rights to the stadium totalling $154.5 million over 20 years. On April 11, 2017, the University of Phoenix terminated the naming rights just over halfway into the 20-year deal, citing financial woes. The university kept its name on the stadium until a replacement sponsor was found. On September 4, 2018, State Farm reached a deal securing the rights through 2036.

== Parking space ==
The stadium has approximately 14,000 on-site parking spaces (plus 12,000 adjacent spaces), located in numerous lots that surround the stadium's 2,000 disabled parking spaces. The design improvement, featured for example in a Discovery program about this stadium, is zoning. Parking spaces for guests are zoned with preferred leaving directions, to achieve the fastest possible movement of traffic.

== See also ==
- List of American football stadiums by capacity
- List of current NFL stadiums
- Lists of stadiums

Events and tenants
Preceded by Sun Devil Stadium	Home of the Arizona Cardinals; 2006 – present	Succeeded by current
Preceded by Sun Devil Stadium	Home of the Fiesta Bowl; 2007 – present	Succeeded by current
Preceded by AT&T Stadium	Home of the College Football Playoff National Championship; 2016	Succeeded by Raymond James Stadium
Preceded by Rose Bowl; Rose Bowl	Home of the BCS National Championship Game; 2007; 2011	Succeeded by Louisiana Superdome; Mercedes-Benz Superdome
Preceded by Dolphin Stadium; MetLife Stadium; SoFi Stadium	Host of the Super Bowl; XLII 2008; XLIX 2015; LVII 2023	Succeeded by Raymond James Stadium; Levi's Stadium; Allegiant Stadium
Preceded by Lambeau Field	Host of the NFC Championship Game; 2009	Succeeded by Louisiana Superdome
Preceded by NRG Stadium	Host of WrestleMania; 2010 (XXVI)	Succeeded by Georgia Dome
Preceded by Aloha Stadium	Host of the NFL Pro Bowl; 2015	Succeeded by Aloha Stadium
Preceded by NRG Stadium; NRG Stadium	NCAA Men's Final Four Venue; 2017; 2024	Succeeded by Alamodome; Alamodome
