= Arizona Sports and Tourism Authority =

Corporate and political entity in Arizona

- Company type: corporate and political entity
- Founded: Phoenix (2000)
- Headquarters: State Farm Stadium; One Cardinals Drive; Glendale, Arizona 85305
- Key people: Tom Sadler, President and CEO; Debbie Johnson, Chair
- Website: www.az-sta.com

The Arizona Sports and Tourism Authority (AZSTA) is a corporate and political body having the rights, powers and immunities of a municipal corporation. It was created on April 24, 2000, by Arizona Senate Bill 1220. The mission of the AZSTA is to build and operate a multipurpose facility, to provide funding for tourism promotion in Maricopa County, to improve Cactus League spring training facilities, and to build community youth and amateur sports and recreational facilities.

The AZSTA Board of Directors consists of nine citizens of Maricopa Co. who volunteer their time and accept no compensation or per diem. The Board members are appointed to five-year terms by the Governor (5), the President of the Senate (2) and the Speaker of the House (2) and are eligible to serve two terms. Board appointees are appointed to achieve a balanced representation of the Valley's regions as well as the tourism industry, Cactus League and youth sports. The daily operation of the AZSTA is overseen by the Executive Staff Members.

Arizona Sports and Tourism Authority office entrance located at State Farm Stadium.

== History ==
On April 24, 2000, Arizona Governor Jane Dee Hull signed Arizona Senate Bill 1220 which created the Arizona Tourism and Sports Authority (initially known as the TSA). Later in April 2004 the Arizona Tourism and Sports Authority was renamed to the Arizona Sports and Tourism Authority in order to avoid confusion with the similarly abbreviated Transportation Security Administration.

The original Arizona Tourism and Sports Authority logo.

The first order of business for the TSA was to bring a stadium financing package to voters in Maricopa County which took the form of Arizona Proposition 302. On November 7, 2000, voters approved the ballot initiative with a 52% to 48% vote.

=== Youth sports ===
In May 2001 the TSA approved its first youth sports project. In late September 2001 the TSA approved the city of Avondale’s youth sports complex proposal. The TSA hosted a Youth and Amateur Sports Town Hall in April 2002. During the Town Hall, the TSA formed an advisory committee and announced plans to develop existing youth and amateur sports facilities. The Advisory Committee held its first meeting in May 2002. In December 2002, the TSA approved an intergovernmental agreement with the city of Avondale for a 10-field complex to be completed by December 2003. In February 2003, the TSA hosted the First Annual Youth and Amateur Sports Summit. In June 2003, the TSA broke ground for the Avondale Regional Youth Sports Complex. The Youth and Amateur Sports Committee provided the TSA with recommendations, and in February 2004 the TSA approved $1.32 million for 13 projects and programs.

=== Spring training ===
In February 2002, AZSTA made its first spring training decision when it voted to increase the funding commitment for the City of Surprise spring training facility. In December 2002, the city of Surprise held the grand opening of "Billy Parker Field". In February 2003, AZSTA sold $33 million of Cactus League bonds and directed $4.3 million to a $6.4 million upgrade project for Phoenix Municipal Stadium. The $4.3 million was presented in a commemorative check on March 26, 2003, during an Oakland Athletics vs. Arizona Diamondbacks game. The Phoenix Municipal Stadium project was completed in February 2004.

AZSTA has committed $68.3 million in funding for renovations to Cactus League facilities in Scottsdale, Tempe, Phoenix and Surprise. It is estimated that over 30 years, AZSTA will contribute $205 million to the refurbishment of Cactus League facilities in Maricopa County.

AZSTA has funded:

- $32 million to the Surprise Stadium (Kansas City Royals & Texas Rangers);
- $4.3 million to Phoenix Municipal Stadium (Oakland Athletics);
- $12 million to Tempe Diablo Stadium (Los Angeles Angels of Anaheim);
- $20 million to Scottsdale Stadium (San Francisco Giants).

Upcoming Cactus League projects include a stadium in Goodyear for the Cleveland Indians and a stadium in Glendale for the Los Angeles Dodgers and the Chicago White Sox.
