= Cartwright Elementary School District =

- U.S. National Register of Historic Places
- U.S. Historic district
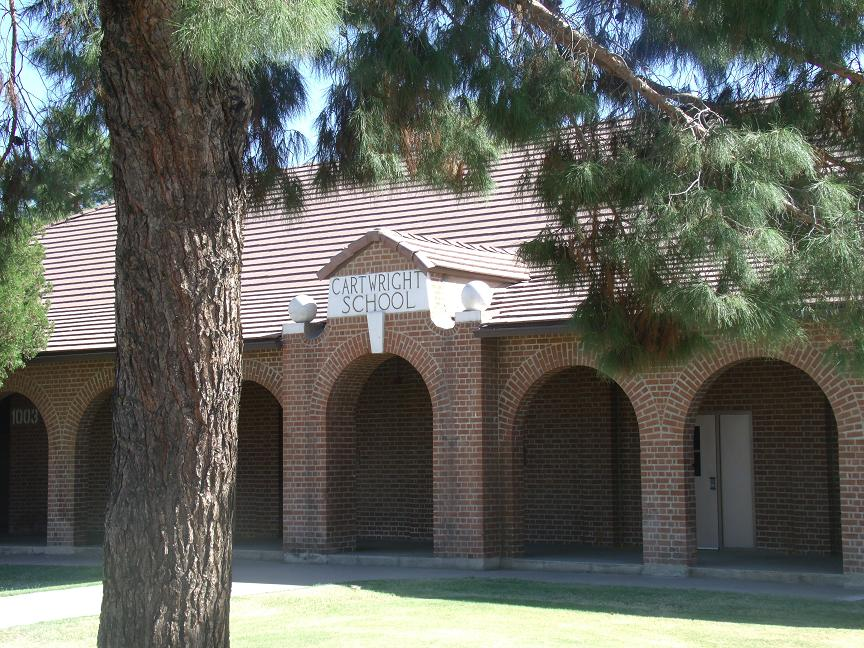
- Cartwright School

- Location within Arizona Location within the United States
- Location: 5833 W. Thomas Rd. Phoenix, Arizona
- Coordinates: 33.48°N 112.19°W
- Built: 1921
- NRHP reference No.: 93000739
- Added to NRHP: 1993

Cartwright Elementary School District is a school district in Phoenix, Arizona, United States which operates 21 schools in the city's Maryvale neighborhood. The district contains twelve K–5 elementary schools, four K–8 elementary schools, four 6th–8th grade middle schools and a preschool. The district serve more than 18,000 students.

== History ==
The area at 51st Avenue and Thomas Road was settled and homesteaded by Reddick Jasper Cartwright (1837–1914), a native of Illinois, in 1877. In 1884, Tom Brockman, a native of California and fellow homesteader, donated land at 59th Avenue and Thomas Road for a school site. Cartwright and his neighbors raised enough funds to build the first one-room school house. In 1921, Cartwright School joined a neighboring school known as Independence and the Cartwright School District was founded. Glenn L. Downs became the first superintendent of the district in 1928, who lived with his family in the residence which is currently the Cartwright Heritage House. The two-story original all-brick structure was replaced with the structure which stands today. The Cartwright School was listed in the National Register of Historic Places in 1993.

In 2020 the instructional week became a four-day week as the COVID-19 pandemic in Arizona occurred. In 2023, the district permanently switched to a four-day week after positive response from staff, students and families. The district will return to a 5-day week for the 2026-27 school year.

In early 2024, the Cartwright Education Association, which represents about 450 employees in the district, came under police investigation for what was described as "substantial" missing funds that had been collected from employee paychecks. In response, the district formally severed ties with the employee union.

Hank Stephenson and Nicole Ludden wrote an article in 2025 for Arizona Agenda which proposed the Cartwright district might have the state's "most dysfunctional school board". They describe meetings that often deteriorate into screaming, frequent turnover of high-level staff, regular threats of lawsuits and several nepotism allegations, and financial irregularities including paying millions in penalties to the Internal Revenue Service for failures to file timely paperwork.

In 2026, the district's governing board voted to fire two high-level employees: Deputy Superintendent and Chief Financial Officer Victoria Farrar, along with Deputy Superintendent Giovanna Grijalva. They were accused of mismanagement and failure to follow procedures, but Farrar and Grijavala both claim the termination was in retaliation for their raising questions about district operations.

== Schools ==
- Bret R. Tarver School
- G. Frank Davidson School
- Marc T. Atkinson Middle School
- Byron A. Barry School
- Glenn L. Downs School
- Palm Lane School
- Cartwright School
- Heatherbrae School
- Peralta School
- Charles W. Harris School
- Holiday Park School
- Raúl H. Castro Middle School
- Desert Sands Middle School
- John F. Long School
- Starlight Park School
- Estrella Middle School
- Justine Spitalny School
- Sunset School
- Frank Borman School
- Manuel "Lito" Peña Jr School
- Tomahawk School

== Gallery of Historical Cartwright School ==
Historical Cartwright School in Phoenix, Arizona
(NRHP = National Register of Historic Places)
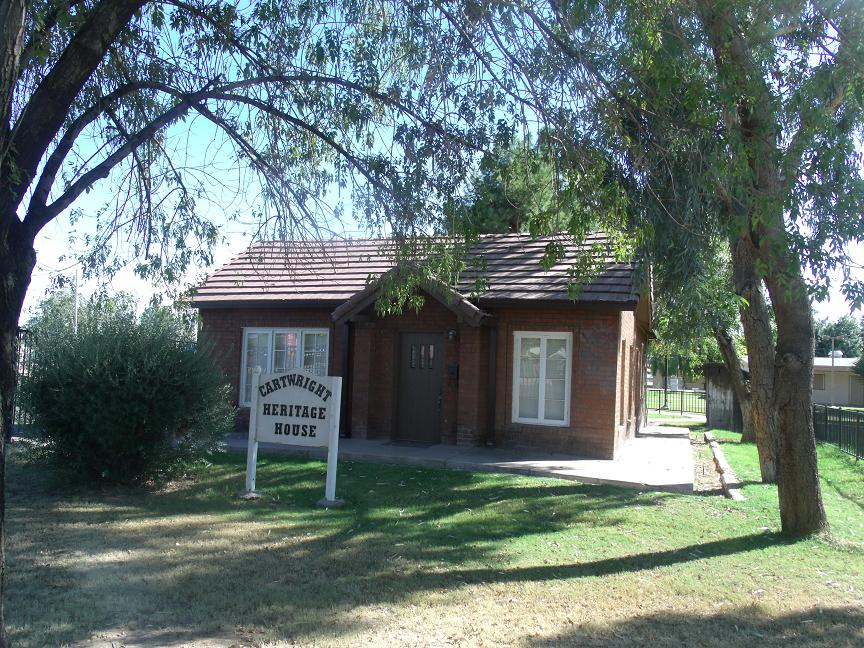
Historic Cartwright Heritage House, one of the buildings listed in the NRHP in 1993, which housed Mr. Glenn L. Downs in 1923. Downs was the first superintendent of the Cartwright School Dist

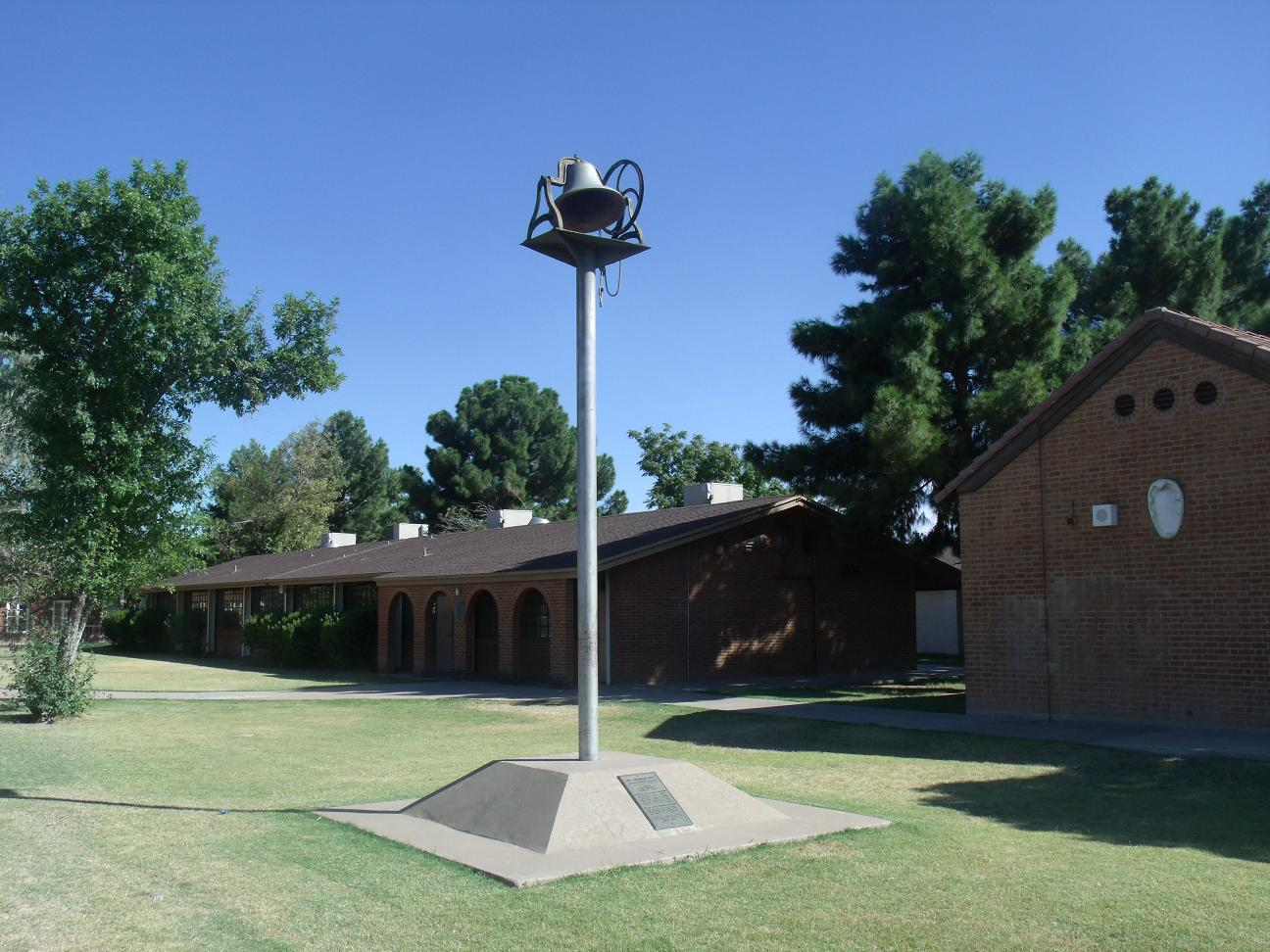
1910 Cartwright School bell

== Further media ==
- "Arizona school district adopts four-day workweek for teachers". Fox 10 Phoenix – via YouTube.
