= Maryvale, Phoenix =

Urban village in Phoenix, Arizona, United States

Maryvale
- Urban Village of Phoenix
- Maryvale Urban Village within Phoenix.

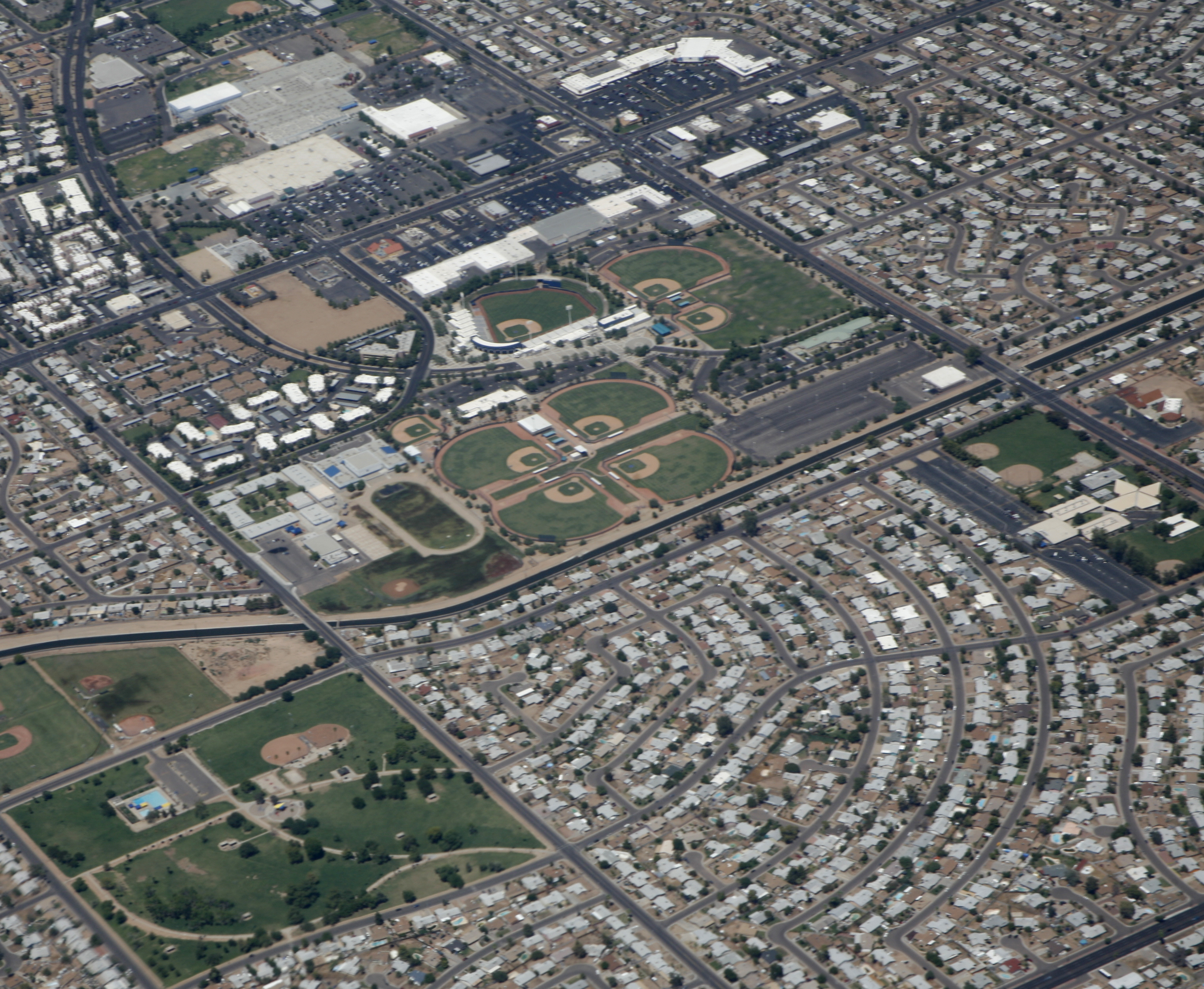
- Maryvale Baseball Park and surrounding suburban development.
- Coordinates: 33°30′07″N 112°10′40″W
- Country: United States
- State: Arizona
- City: Phoenix

Area
  - Total: 37.6 sq mi (97.4 km^{2})
- Elevation: 1,119 ft (341 m)

Population (2010)
  - Total: 208,189
  - Density: 6,500/sq mi (2,500/km^{2})
- Area code: 602 623
- Website: Maryvale Village Planning Committee

Maryvale is an urban village of Phoenix, Arizona. With a population of over 200,000 Maryvale has the largest population of the such villages in Phoenix.

== History ==
Plans for Maryvale began to take shape in the 1950s, when developer John F. Long (1920–2008) came up with the idea of a master-planned community on the western part of the city of Phoenix, with an aim of turning the area into a suburb with affordable homes and one of the first master planned communities in the country. Long and his Maryvale homes were regarded as marvels at the time due to the speed in which they were built and assembly line like process used to construct them. In 1954, Long had sold 350 homes before they were even built, and was capable of completing about eight a day. Maryvale was designed to include space for parks, schools, and the fulfillment of other community services. Marketing involved famous actors of that era including Buster Keaton, Pat Boone, and future President Ronald Reagan.

The community was named after Long's wife, Mary, and its initial master plan was drawn up by architect Victor Gruen. By 1956, Long was selling 125 homes a week in Maryvale.

Demographic changes came to the area by 1975, as residents began moving to the north Valley. Meanwhile, Hispanic families began moving into the area in the 1980s. Additionally, the discovery of a cancer cluster in the 1980s (see below) reportedly contributed to white flight in the community. The Savings and Loan crisis in the 1980s also hit the area hard, leading to an increase in foreclosures and resident relocation to other areas.

Due to the demographic change, the community experienced major disinvestment leading to slowed development, and increased poverty and crime. This led to the modern day negative reputation of the community.

Maryvale was noted for having a crime problem in 1999. Gangs moved into condominium and apartment complexes in the area, and were not afraid of challenging law enforcement. Gang members at one particular condominium complex, Woodmar, were noted to have threatened law enforcement officials to the extent Phoenix police did not allow its officers to enter the complex without the backup of at least two other police officers. The area also had a problem with graffiti as of 2018.

In 1999, Phoenix Police Department officer Marc Atkinson was shot and killed in Maryvale, in the first fatal shooting of a police officer in the city of Phoenix since 1991. In that same year, Phoenix police began an effort aimed at reducing crime at Woodmar, with search warrants served, drug and criminal syndicate charges filed against individuals, and restraining orders served on people who did not live at the complex. As a result, there was a decrease in crime at the complex, but the Maryvale community, as a whole, is still experiencing crime problems. The community was rocked by a number of shootings that were allegedly committed by the Serial Street Shooter in 2016. At the time, community leaders expressed concerns that Maryvale had been ignored by city leaders and the Phoenix Police Department.

Maryvale made local, national, and international headlines in 2014, after reports surfaced of feral chihuahuas terrorizing area residents. The veracity of the reports, however, has been challenged by the Phoenix New Times.

== Geography ==
The community is located on the western edge of the City of Phoenix, and encompasses an area southwest of Grand Avenue, West of Interstate 17, north of McDowell Road and Interstate 10, and east and southeast of Phoenix city limits.

== Demographics ==
Maryvale is the most populous of Phoenix's urban villages.

As of 2010, Maryvale had a population of 208,189. While census figures show no single ethnic group being in the majority, Caucasians made up the largest single racial group, comprising 49.5% of the community's population. Blacks or African Americans make up 6% of Maryvale's population, followed by American Indian or Alaska Native (1.9%), Native Hawaiian and Other Pacific Islanders (1.9%), and Asian (1.5%). (37% of the community's population are identified as members of "Some Other Race".)

Hispanics comprise 76% of Maryvale's residents. This makes the village a minority-majority community.

The median household income in Maryvale is $40,504 per year, and 20.63% of the community's population live under the poverty line.

== Arts and culture ==
Maryvale is home to Ak-Chin Pavilion, located at 2121 N 83rd Avenue, an entertainment venue for the Phoenix metropolitan area. The amphitheater first opened in 1990, with a total capacity of approximately 20,000.

== Sports and recreation ==
=== Baseball ===
The American Family Fields of Phoenix, a 56-acre facility located at 51st Avenue and Indian School Road is the spring training home for the Milwaukee Brewers. The stadium first opened in 1998 as Maryvale Baseball Park. In November 2017, the Phoenix City Council approved a deal that will keep the Brewers at the facility for another 25 years. In exchange, the city will contribute US$2 million per year, for five years, towards park renovation efforts.

Camelback Ranch, a 141-acre facility located at 107th Avenue and Camelback Road, is the spring training home for the Los Angeles Dodgers and Chicago White Sox.

=== Golf ===
The City of Phoenix once operated the Maryvale Golf Course, a championship-length course that was designed by William F. Bell, who also designed Torrey Pines Golf Course in San Diego, California. The 130-acre facility opened in 1961, but the City of Phoenix eventually ran the golf course at a loss of $250,000 per year. The golf course reopened as the Grand Canyon University Golf Course on January 6, 2016, as a partnership between the City of Phoenix and Grand Canyon University (GCU). The new golf course was redesigned by John Fought, with a rebuilt clubhouse. GCU, which invested $10 million into the project, will split the golf course's profits with the City of Phoenix after it recoups its initial investment.

== Infrastructure ==
=== Transportation ===
The Desert Sky Transit Center, which opened for service in December 2015, serves public transit users in the area. A number of Valley Metro bus routes call at the station, including the bus rapid transit route I-10 West RAPID, which carries passengers from the center to Downtown Phoenix, and the Phoenix/Gila Bend Regional Connector, which carries passengers between the Transit Center and Gila Bend.

The Maryvale community is also served by a local circulator bus route called Phoenix Neighborhood Circulator MARY.

=== Health ===
In 2011, non-profit community health center group Mountain Health Center converted an abandoned theater in Maryvale into a clinic.

In December 2017, Abrazo Community Health Network closed its campus, citing declining demands for its services. The decision to close the hospital was announced in October of that year and, although officials with Abrazo said the closure would not impact the community's access to healthcare, residents were concerned that the extra time spent traveling to other healthcare facilities nearby could be detrimental during an emergency situation.

The public hospital system, Valleywise Health (formerly Maricopa Integrated Health System), operates the Valleywise Community Health Center – West Maryvale, Valleywise Emergency – Maryvale, and the Valleywise Behavioral Health Center – Maryvale. Its sole hospital is Valleywise Health Medical Center in Phoenix. In 2018, Maricopa Integrated Health System announced it will reopen the former Abrazo hospital facility, along with its emergency department, in 2019. The former hospital facility reopened as Valleywise Behavioral Health Center – Maryvale and Valleywise Emergency – Maryvale. On October 28, 2021, the Maryvale clinic moved to West Maryvale.

== Environment ==
Maryvale was noted as being built on farmland at a time when the pesticide DDT was in regular use. Maryvale is also the location of a state Superfund site known as the West Central Phoenix Water Quality Assurance Revolving Fund (WQARF), which involves the dumping of chemicals, including TCE, by a number of industries in the area.

The West Central Phoenix WQARF, according to Arizona's Department of Environmental Quality, is an area that contains five plumes of groundwater contamination, including Volatile organic compound, PCE, and TCE. The water under the area is not used in the public drinking water system.

=== Cancer cluster ===
In 1987, community residents became aware Maryvale was part of a cancer cluster. From 1970 to 1986, newborns to 19-year-olds died of leukemia at a rate twice the era's national average. In addition, a study that began in 1983 and was released in 1987 revealed that, in the same general area of the cancer cluster, elevated rates of birth defects were identified.

The state's Department of Health Services (ADHS) was reportedly aware of the cancer cluster problem at least five years prior to the report, according to local media reports, and repeatedly refused to launch a substantive investigation. In addition, the agency also told the principal of a parochial school in the area – who first discovered children were dying – to not talk about the issue.

A study was later launched by the state, with an original completion deadline of 1991. The study, under the oversight of the Centers for Disease Control and Prevention, faced a number of delays, but eventually found no link between environmental factors and the leukemia cases. Critics accused ADHS of not looking seriously at the community's water supply, instead focusing on collecting data on a wide array of variables. Some critics also leveled accusations that the study was intentionally drawn out, with the intention of deflecting litigation against the city of Phoenix and pollution generating industries. As recently as 2009, Arizona's Department of Environmental Quality maintains there is no link between Maryvale's groundwater contamination and increased cancer rates.

== Notable residents ==
- Henry Cejudo, wrestler and UFC Flyweight Champion; won gold medal at 2008 Beijing Olympics
- Doug Mathis, professional baseball pitcher
- Sandra Day O'Connor, first female justice of the United States Supreme Court
- CeCe Peniston, R&B singer
- Phillippi Sparks, NFL player
- Darren Woodson, NFL player
- Anne Lindeman, Arizona state legislator from 1972 to 1986
- Frank Garcia, Maryvale High School, NFL Football player, Arizona Cardinal
- Korva Coleman, Maryvale High School, NPR Newscaster
